= List of Orchidaceae genera =

This is a list of genera in the orchid family (Orchidaceae), originally according to The Families of Flowering Plants - L. Watson and M. J. Dallwitz. This list is adapted regularly with the changes published in the Orchid Research Newsletter which is published twice a year by the Royal Botanic Gardens, Kew. The most up to date list of accepted genera, natural nothogenera, species and natural nothospecies with their synonyms can be found on the World Checklist of Selected Plants Families Search Page and Plants of the World Online published by the Royal Botanic Gardens, Kew. This list is reflected on Wikispecies Orchidaceae and the new eMonocot website Orchidaceae Juss.

This taxonomy undergoes constant change, mainly through evidence from DNA study. Orchids were traditionally defined by morphological similarity (structure of their flowers and other parts). However, recent changes to nomenclature have been driven primarily by DNA studies and also by re-examination of herbarium specimens. This has led to a reduction of genera and species as well as re-circumscription of subfamilies, tribes and subtribes. Orchid taxonomy is still being revised and each year about another 150 new species are being discovered. The list of genera alone currently stands just short of 1000 entries.

From a cladistic point of view, the orchid family is considered to be monophyletic, i.e. the group incorporates all the taxa derived from an ancestral group.

The taxonomy of the orchids is explained on the page Taxonomy of the orchid family.

== Subfamilies ==
There are five recognized subfamilies:

- Apostasioideae (two genera, Neuwiedia and Apostasia)
- Cypripedioideae (five genera: Cypripedium, Mexipedium, Paphiopedilum, Phragmipedium and Selenipedium
- Epidendroideae (has 15,000 species in 576 genera)
- Orchidoideae (7 tribes and 3,630 species; has 2 subclades with tribes Orchideae and Diseae then the other has tribes Cranichideae, Chloraeeae and Diurideae)
- Vanilloideae (15 genera and about 180 species: Tribe Pogonieae (77 species; Cleistes, Cleistesiopsis, Duckeella, Isotria, and Pogonia) also Tribe Vanilleae (with 172 species; Clematepistephium, Cyrtosia, Epistephium, Eriaxis, Erythrorchis, Galeola, Lecanorchis, Pseudovanilla and Vanilla)

== Genera ==
As of July 2025, Plants of the World Online accepts 693 genera and several inter-generic hybrids.

=== A ===
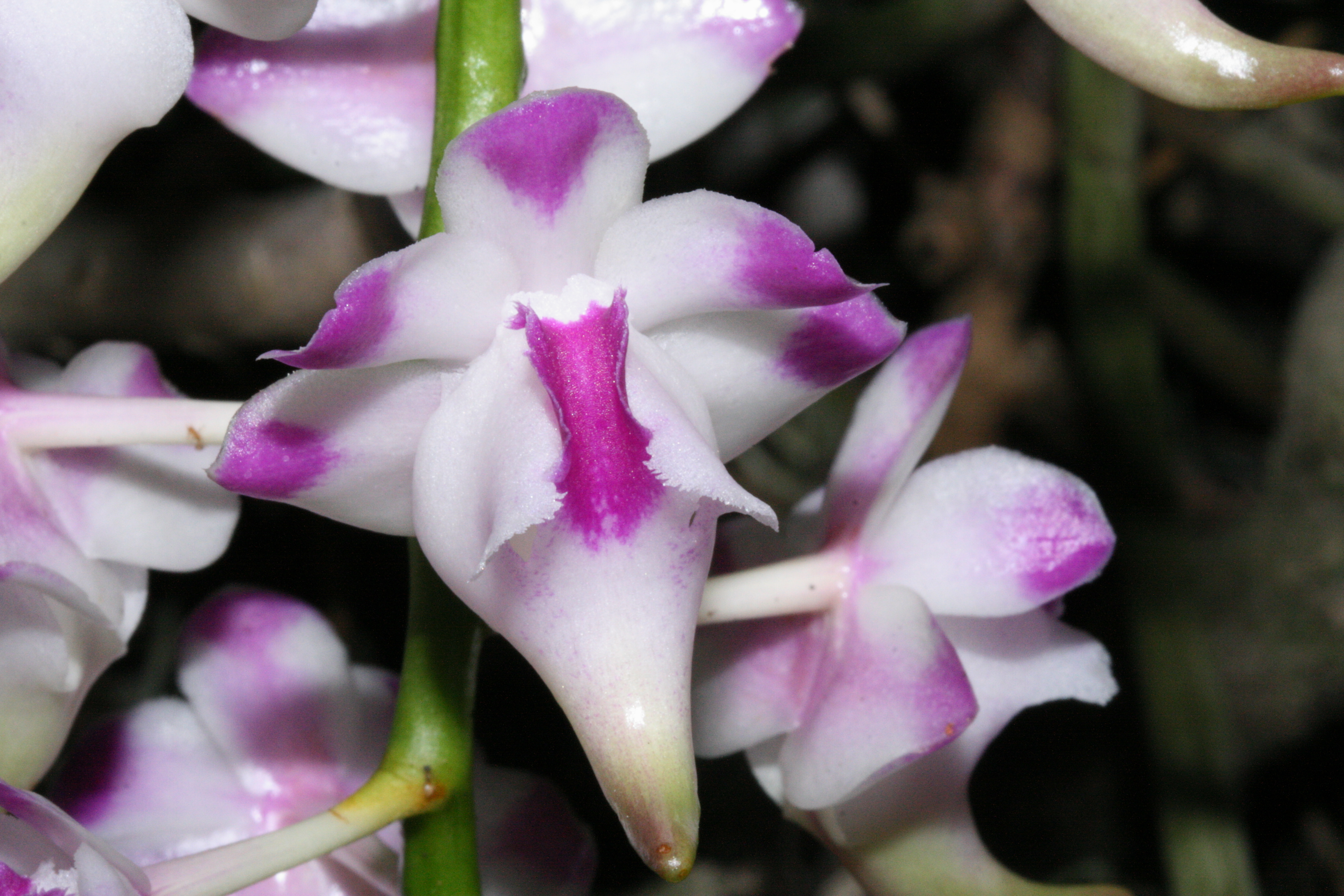
Aerides lawrenciae

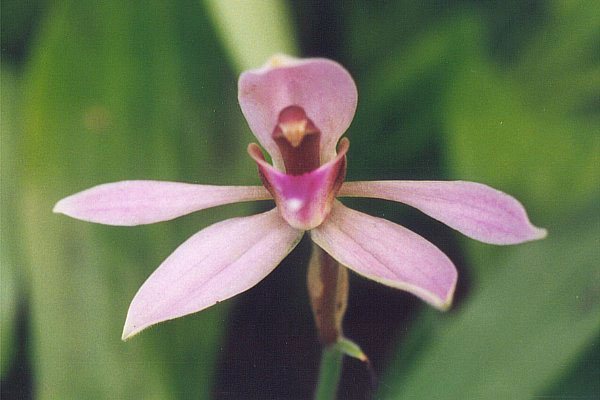
Ancistrochilus rothschildianus

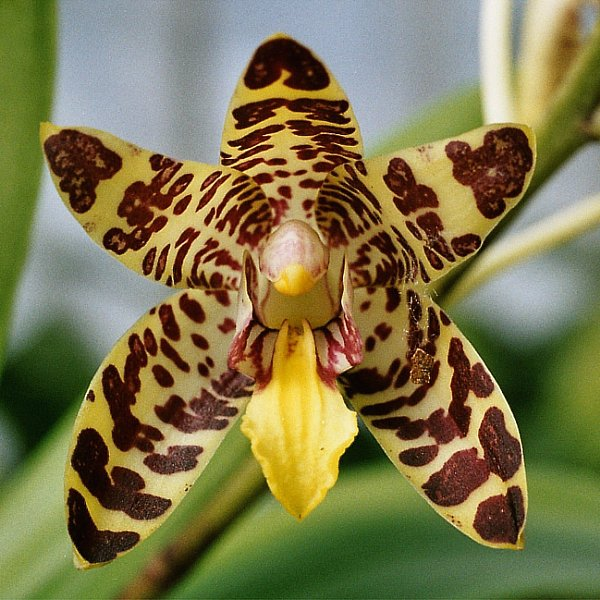
Ansellia africana

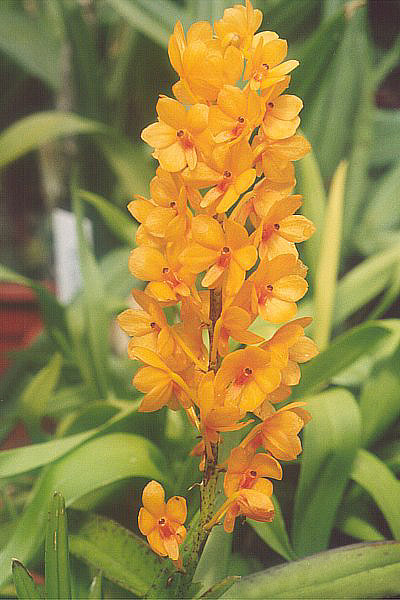
Ascocentrum miniatum

- Aa Rchb.f
- Acampe Lindl.
- Acanthophippium Blume
- Achlydosa M.A.Clem. & D.L.Jones
- Acianthera Scheidw.
- Acianthus R.Br.
- Acineta Lindl.
- Acriopsis Reinw. ex Blume
- Acrorchis Dressler
- Adamantinia Van den Berg & C.N.Gonç
- Adenochilus Hook.f.
- Adenoncos Blume
- Adrorhizon Hook.f.
- Aenhenrya Gopalan
- Aerangis Rchb.f.
- Aeranthes Lindl.
- Aerides Lour. – fox brush orchid
- Aeridostachya (Hook.f.) Brieger
- Aetheorhyncha Dressler
- Afropectinariella M.Simo & Stévart
- Aganisia Lindl.
- Aglossorrhyncha Schltr.
- Agrostophyllum Blume
- Alamania Lex.
- Alatiliparis Marg. & Szlach.
- Altensteinia Kunth.
- Ambrella H.Perrier
- Amesiella Schltr. ex Garay
- Amoana Leopardi & Carnevali
- × Anacamptiplatanthera P.Fourn. (Anacamptis × Platanthera)
- Anacamptis Rich.
- × Anacamptorchis E.G.Camus (Anacamptis × Orchis)
- Anathallis Barb.Rodr.
- Ancistrochilus Rolfe
- Ancistrorhynchus Finet
- Andinia (Luer) Luer
- Andreettaea Luer
- Angraecopsis Kraenzl.
- Angraecum Bory
- Anguloa Ruiz & Pav.
- Ania Lindl.
- Anoectochilus Blume – jeweled orchid
- Ansellia Lindl.
- Anthogonium Wall. ex Lindl.
- Aphyllorchis Blume
- Aplectrum (Nutt.) Torr. – Adam and Eve
- Aporostylis Rupp & Hatch
- Apostasia Blume
- Appendicula Blume
- Aracamunia Carnevali & I.Ramírez
- Arachnis Blume
- Archivea Christenson & Jenny
- Arethusa L. – dragon's mouth
- Arpophyllum Lex.
- Arthrochilus F.Muell.
- Artorima Dressler & G.E.Pollard
- Arundina Blume – bamboo orchid
- Aspasia Lindl.
- Aulosepalum Garay
- Auxopus Schltr.

=== B ===
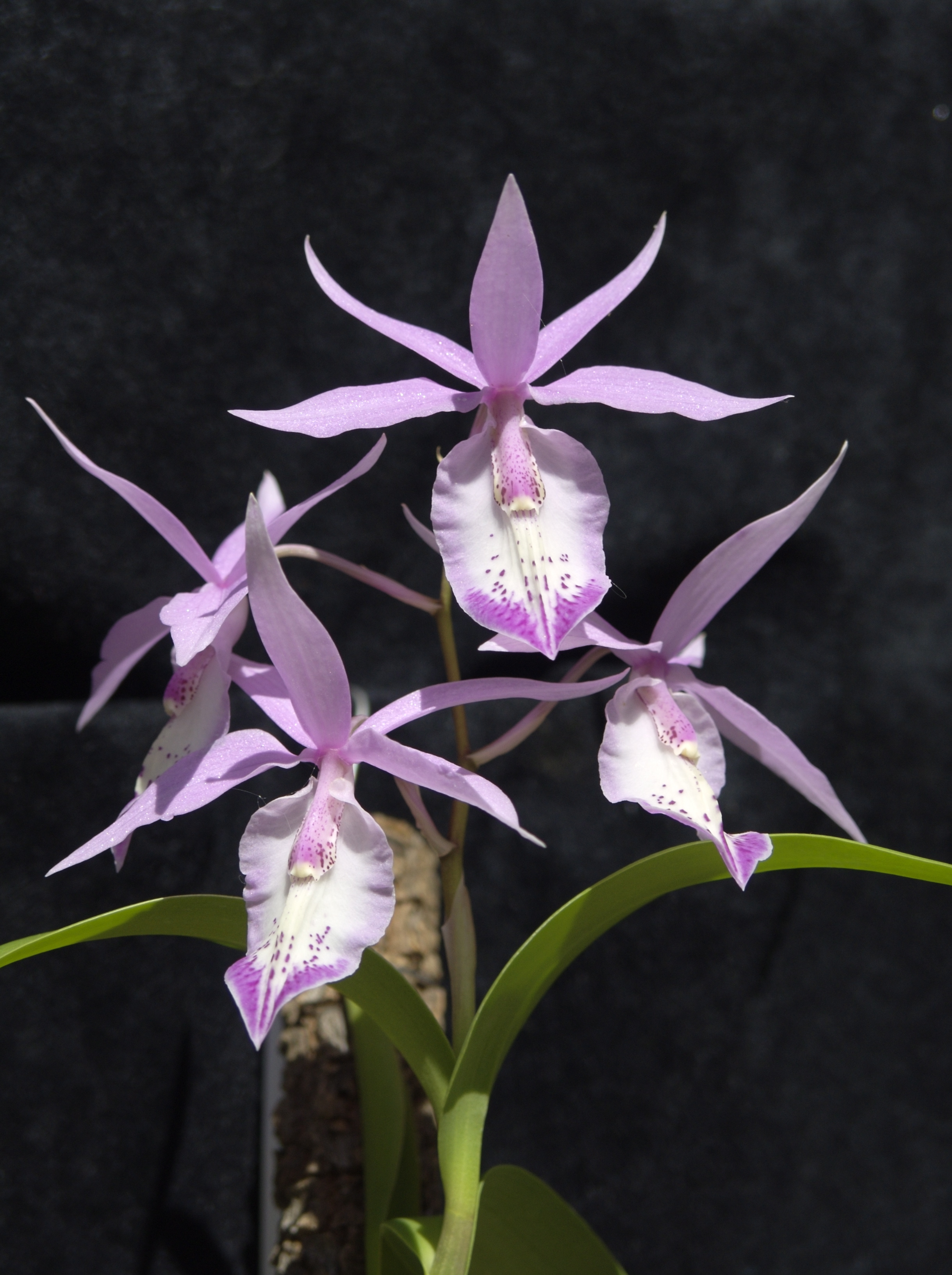
Barkeria spectabilis

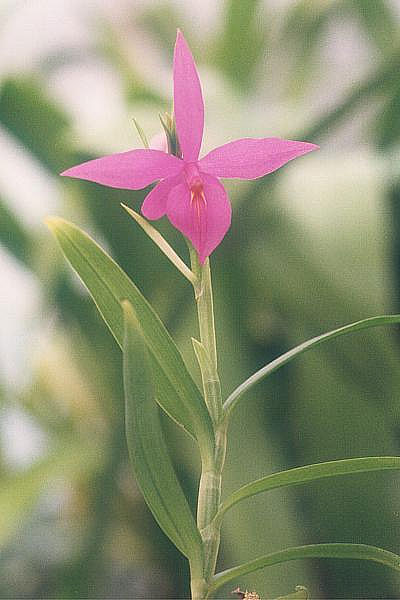
Barkeria shoemakeri

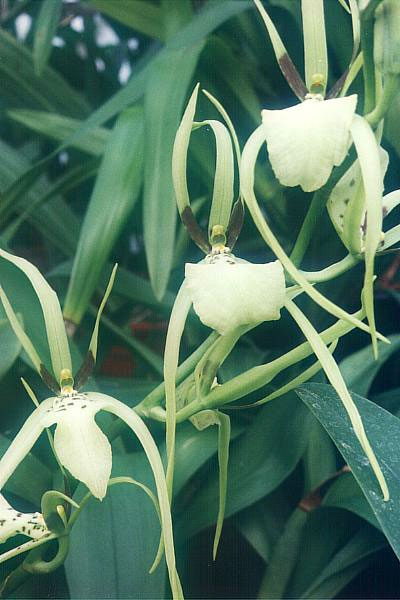
Brassia girouldiana

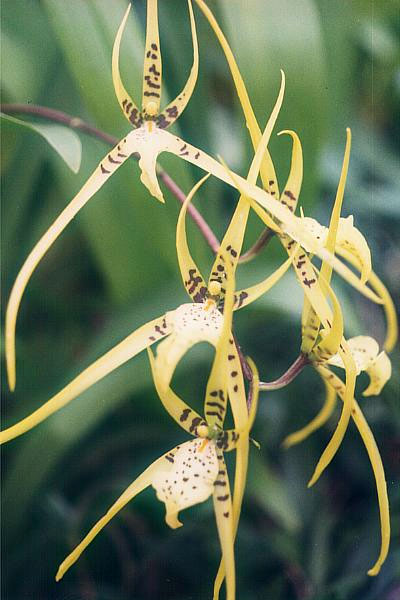
Brassia maculata

- Bambuseria Schuit., Y.P.Ng & H.A.Pedersen
- Barbosella Schltr.
- Barkeria Knowles & Westc.
- Bartholina R.Br. – synonym of Holothrix Rich. ex Lindl.
- Basiphyllaea Schltr. – synonym of Bletia Ruiz & Pav. – crab orchid
- Baskervilla Lindl.
- Batemannia Lindl.
- Beclardia A.Rich.
- Beloglottis Schltr.
- × Bensteinia Christenson (Benzingia × Kefersteinia)
- Benthamia A.Rich.
- Benzingia Dodson
- Bhutanthera Renz – synonym of Herminium L.
- Bidoupia Aver., Ormerod & Duy
- Biermannia King & Pantl.
- Bifrenaria Lindl.
- Bipinnula Comm. ex Juss.
- Bletia Ruiz and Pav. – pine-pink
- Bletilla Rchb.f. – urn orchid
- Bogoria J.J.Sm.
- Bolusiella Schltr.
- Bonatea Willd.
- Brachionidium Lindl. – cup orchid
- Brachycorythis Lindl.
- Brachypeza Garay
- Brachystele Schltr.
- Braemia Jenny
- Brassavola R.Br. – daddy-long-legs
- Brassia R.Br. – cricket orchid
- × Brassocattleya Rolfe (Brassavola × Cattleya)
- Bromheadia Lindl.
- Broughtonia R.Br.
- Brownleea Harv. ex Lindl.
- Bryobium Lindl.
- Buchtienia Schltr.
- Bulbophyllum Thouars – rat-tail orchid
- Burnettia Lindl.

=== C ===
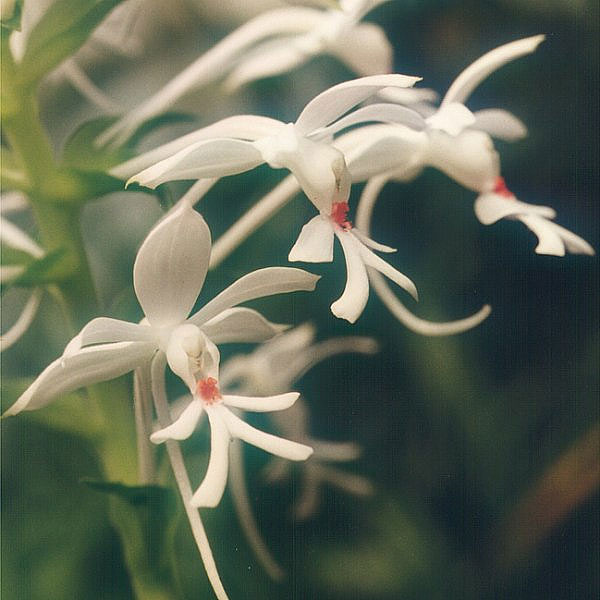
Calanthe triplicata

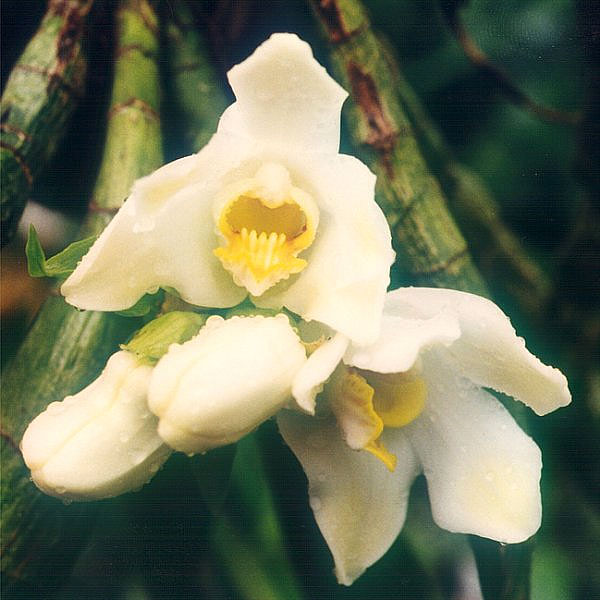
Chysis bractescens

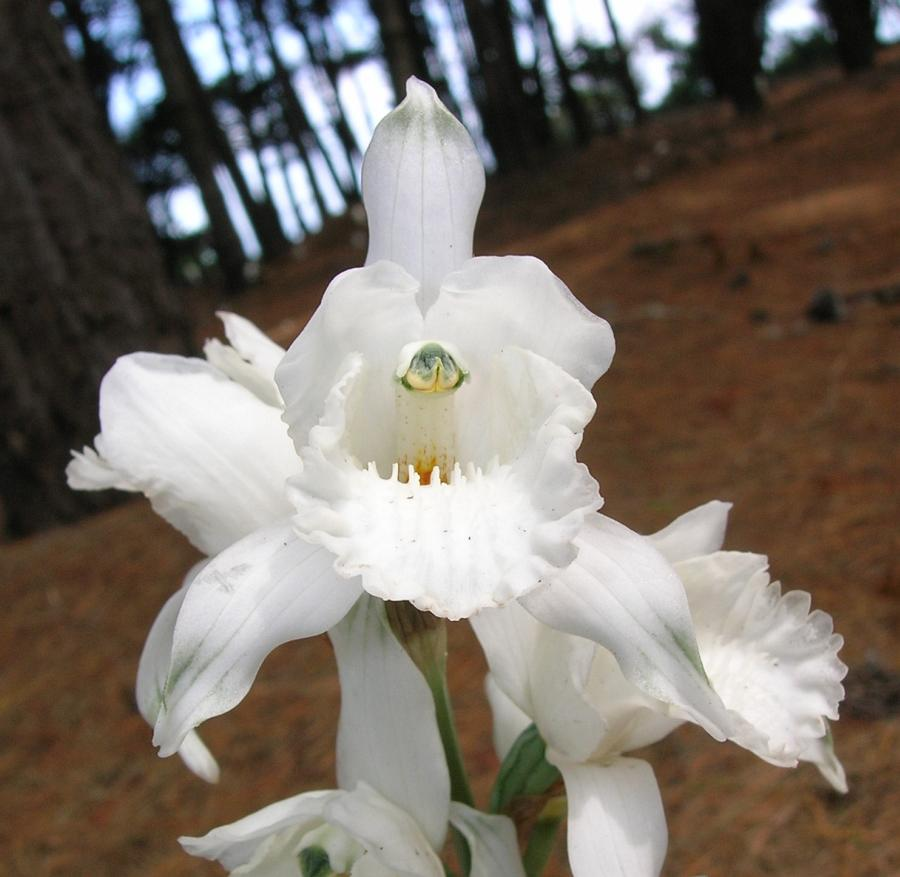
Chloraea crispa

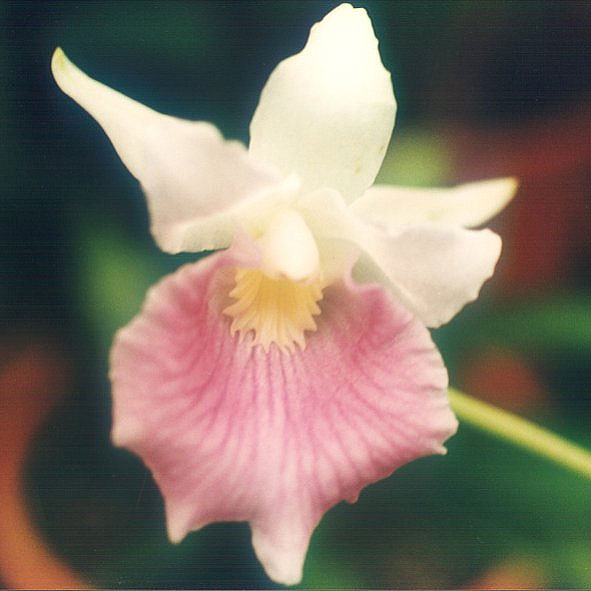
Cochleanthes amazonica

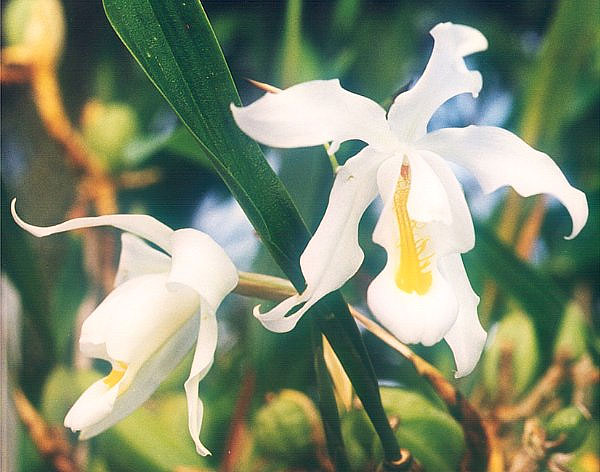
Coelogyne cristata

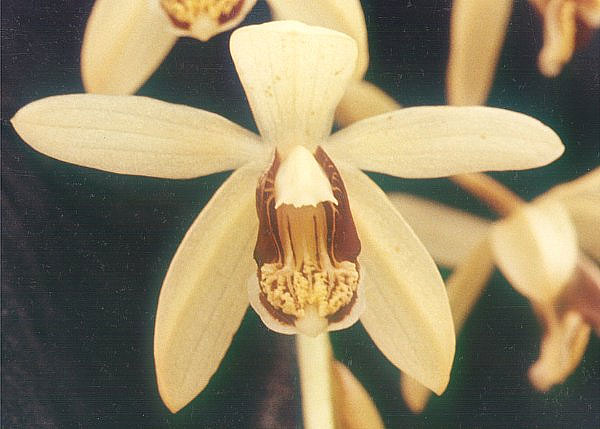
Coelogyne tomentosa

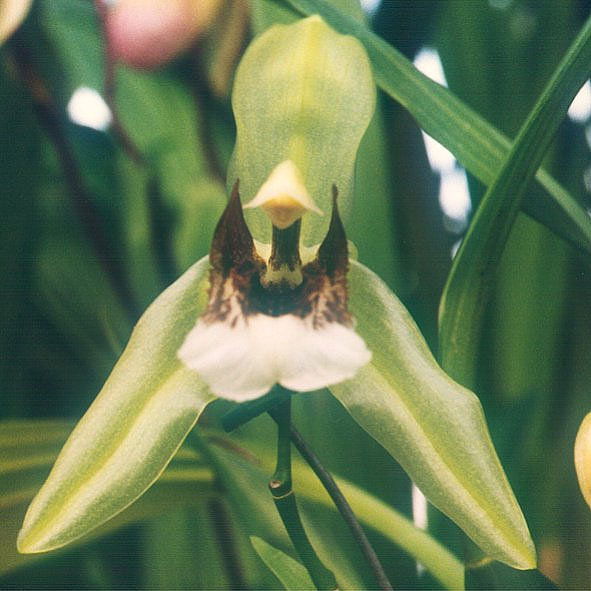
Coelogyne speciosa

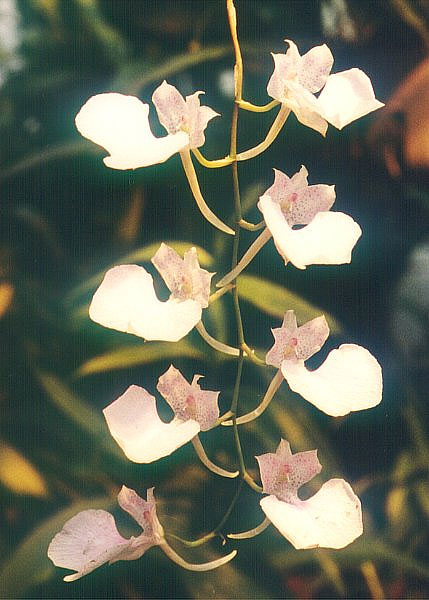
Comparettia macroplectrum

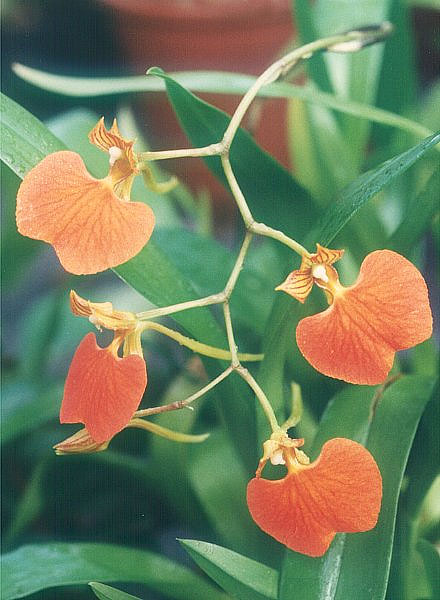
Comparettia speciosa

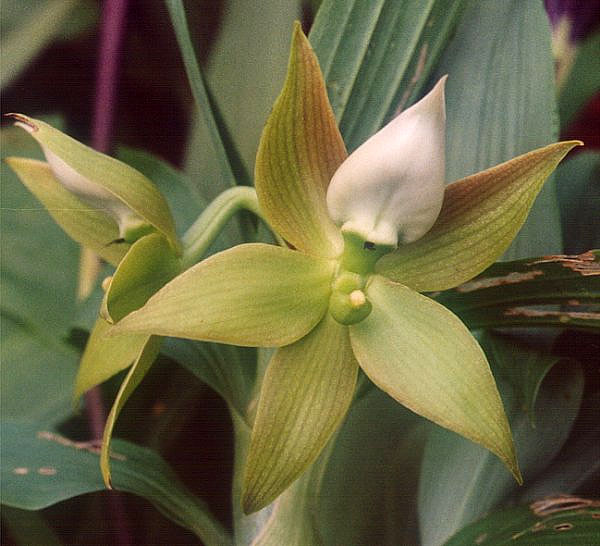
Cycnoches peruviana

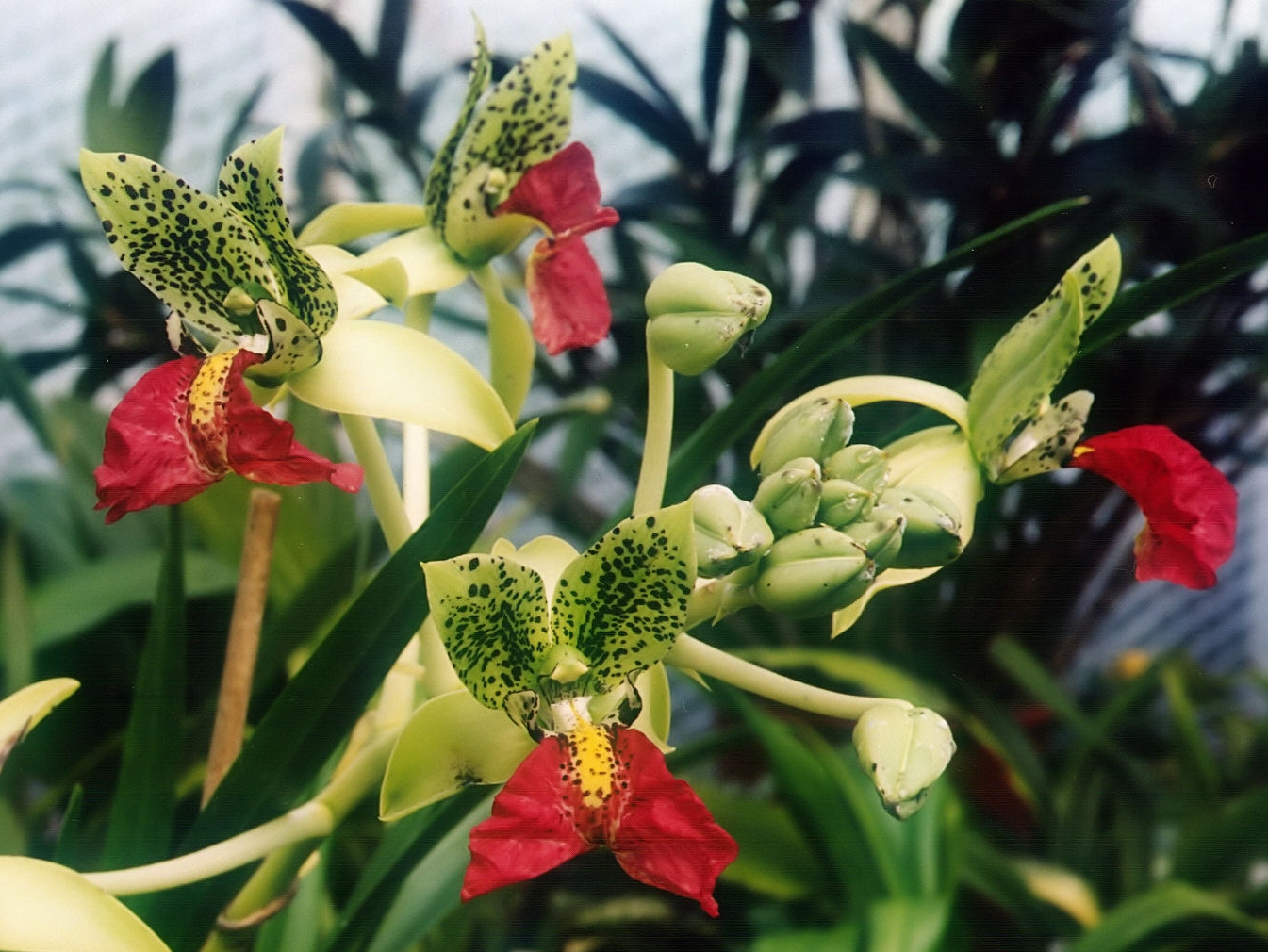
Cymbidiella pardalina

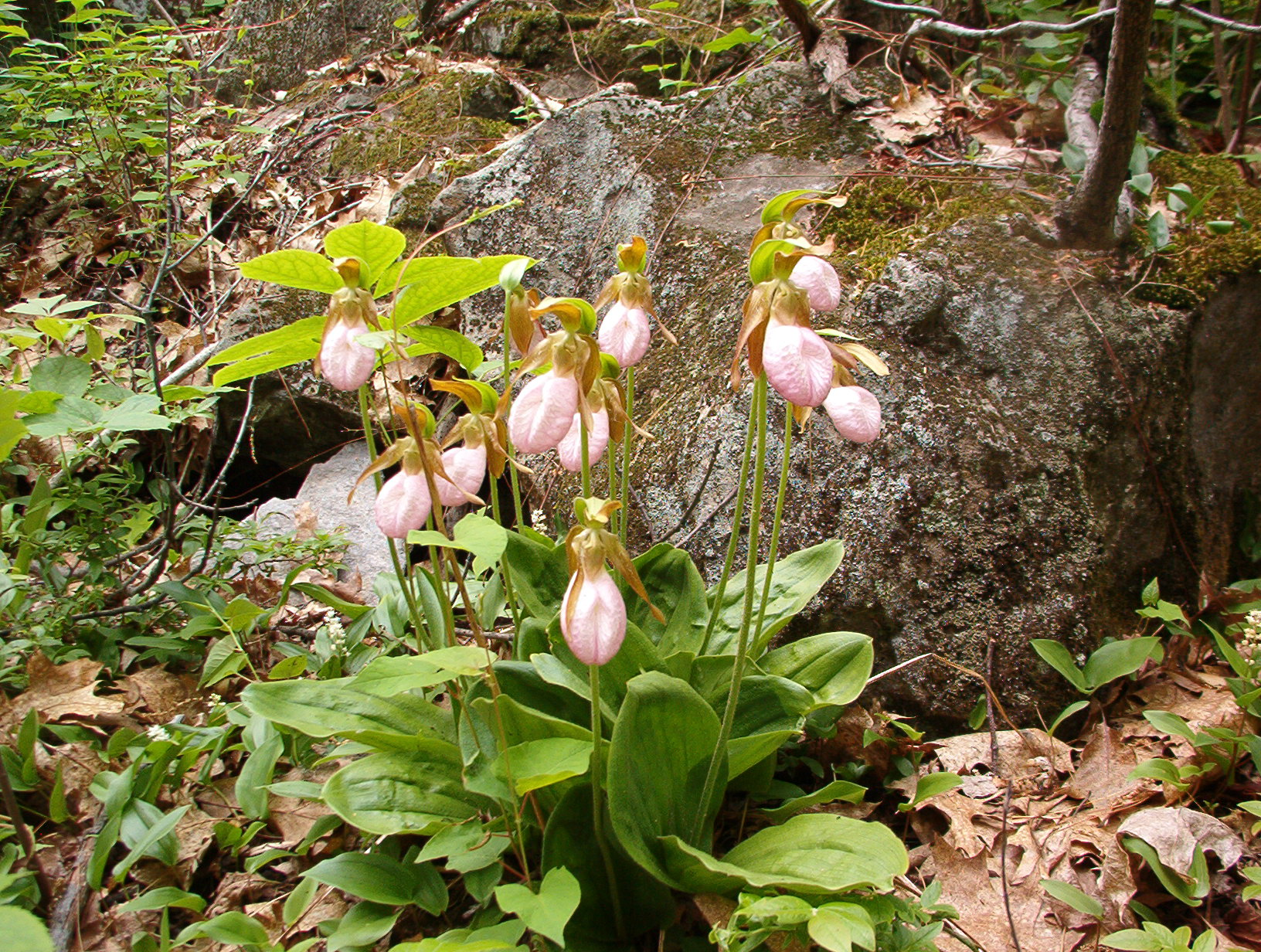
Cypripedium acaule

- Caladenia R.Br.
- Calanthe R.Br.
- Caleana R.Br.
- Callostylis Blume
- Calochilus R.Br. – bearded orchids
- Calopogon R.Br. – grasspink
- Caluera Dodson & Determann
- Calymmanthera Schltr.
- Calypso Salisb. – fairy-slipper orchid
- Calyptrochilum Kraenzl.
- Campanulorchis Brieger
- Campylocentrum Benth. – bent-spur orchid
- Capanemia Barb.Rodr.
- Cardiochilos P.J.Cribb
- Catasetum Rich. ex Kunth
- Cattleya Lindl.
- × Cattlianthe J.M.H.Shaw (Cattleya × Guarianthe)
- × Catyclia J.M.H.Shaw (Cattleya × Encyclia)
- Caucaea Schltr.
- Caularthron Raf.
- Centrostigma Schltr.
- Cephalanthera Rich. – some helleborines, phantom orchid
- × Cephalopactis Asch. & Graebn. (Cephalanthera × Epipactis)
- × Cephalorchis F.M.Vázquez (Cephalanthera × Orchis)
- Ceratandra Lindl.
- Ceratocentron Senghas
- Ceratostylis Blume
- Chamaeanthus Schltr.
- Chamaegastrodia Makino & F.Maek.
- Chamelophyton Garay
- × Chamodenia Peitz (Chamorchis × Gymnadenia)
- Chamorchis Rich.
- Changnienia S.S.Chien
- Chaubardia Rchb.f.
- Chaubardiella Garay
- Cheiradenia Lindl.
- Cheirostylis Blume
- Chelonistele Pfitzer – synonym of Coelogyne Lindl.
- Chiloglottis R.Br.
- Chiloschista Lindl.
- Chloraea Lindl.
- Chondrorhyncha Lindl.
- Chondroscaphe (Dressler) Senghas & G.Gerlach
- Chroniochilus J.J.Sm.
- Chrysoglossum Blume
- Chysis Lindl.
- Chytroglossa Rchb.f.
- Cirrhaea Lindl.
- Cischweinfia Dressler & N.H.Williams
- Claderia Hook.f.
- Cleisocentron Brühl
- Cleisomeria Lindl. ex G.Don
- Cleisostoma Blume
- Cleisostomopsis Seidenf.
- Cleistes Rich. ex Lindl.
- Cleistesiopsis Pansarin & F.Barros – rosebud orchid
- Clematepistephium N.Hallé
- Clowesia Lindl.
- Coccineorchis Schltr.
- Cochleanthes Raf. – fan-shape orchid
- × Cochlezella J.M.H.Shaw (Cochleanthes × Warczewiczella)
- Codonorchis Lindl.
- Coelia Lindl.
- Coeliopsis Rchb.f.
- Coelogyne Lindl.
- Coenoemersa R.González & Lizb.Hern.
- Coilochilus Schltr.
- Collabium Blume
- Comparettia Poepp. & Endl. – snail orchid
- Constantia Poepp. & Endl.
- Cooktownia D.L.Jones
- Corallorhiza Gagnebin – coral root
- Coryanthes Hook. – bucket orchids
- Corybas Salisb.
- Corycium Sw.
- Corymborkis Thouars – crow orchid
- Cottonia Wight
- Cotylolabium Garay
- Cranichis Sw. – helmet orchid
- Cremastra Lindl.
- Crepidium Blume
- Crossoglossa Dressler & Dodson
- Crossoliparis Marg.
- Cryptarrhena R.Br.
- Cryptochilus Wall.
- Cryptopus Lindl.
- Cryptopylos Garay – synonym of Macropodanthus L.O.Williams
- Cryptostylis R.Br.
- Cuitlauzina Lex.
- Cyanaeorchis Barb.Rodr.
- Cyanicula Hopper & A.P.Br. – synonym of Caladenia R.Br.
- × Cyanthera Hopper & A.P.Br. (Cyanicula × Elythranthera)
- Cybebus Garay
- Cyclopogon C.Presl. ladies'-tresses
- Cycnoches Lindl. – swan orchids
- Cylindrolobus Blume
- Cymbidium Sw.
- Cymbilabia D.K.Liu & Ming H.Li
- Cymboglossum (Schltr.) Rauschert
- Cynorkis Thouars
- Cypholoron Dodson & Dressler
- Cypripedium L. – lady's slipper
- Cyrtochiloides N.H.Williams & M.W.Chase
- Cyrtochilum Kunth
- Cyrtopodium R.Br. – cow-horn orchid
- Cyrtorchis Schltr.
- Cyrtosia Blume
- Cyrtostylis R.Br.
- Cystorchis Blume

=== D ===
- × Dactylanthera P.F.Hunt & Summerh. (Dactylorhiza × Platanthera)
- × Dactylocamptis P.F.Hunt & Summerh. (Anacamptis × Dactylorhiza)
- × Dactylodenia Garay & H.R.Sweet (Dactylorhiza × Gymnadenia)
- Dactylorhiza Neck. ex Nevski – key flower
- Dactylostalix Rchb.f.
- Daiotyla Dressler
- Danhatchia Garay & Christenson
- Danxiaorchis J.W.Zhai, F.W.Xing & Z.J.Liu
- Deceptor Seidenf.
- Degranvillea Determann
- Deiregyne Schltr.
- Dendrobium Blume
- Dendrochilum Blume – synonym of Coelogyne Lindl.
- Dendrolirium Blume
- Dendrophylax Rchb.f.
- Devogelia Schuit.
- Diaphananthe Schltr.
- Diceratostele Summerh.
- Dichaea Lindl. – leafy-stem orchid, leaf-stem orchid
- Dichromanthus Garay
- Dickasonia L.O.Williams – synonym of Coelogyne Lindl.
- Didymoplexiella Garay
- Didymoplexiopsis Seidenf.
- Didymoplexis Griff.
- Dienia Lindl.
- Diglyphosa Blume
- Dilochia Lindl.
- Dilochiopsis (Hook.f.) Brieger
- Dilomilis Raf. – parrot-beak orchid
- Dimerandra Schltr.
- Dimorphorchis Rolfe
- Dinema Lindl.
- Dinklageella Mansf.
- Diodonopsis Pridgeon & M.W.Chase
- Diplocentrum Lindl.
- Diplomeris D.Don
- Diploprora Hook.f.
- Dipodium R.Br.
- Disa P.J.Bergius
- Discyphus Schltr.
- Disperis Sw.
- Diuris Sm.
- Domingoa Schltr. – Mona
- Dossinia C.Morren
- Dracomonticola H.P.Linder & Kurzweil
- Draconanthes (Luer) Luer
- Dracula Luer
- Drakaea Lindl.
- Dresslerella Luer
- Dressleria Dodson
- Dryadella Luer
- Dryadorchis Schltr.
- Drymoanthus Nicholls
- Duckeella Porto & Brade
- Dunstervillea Garay
- Dyakia Christenson

=== E ===
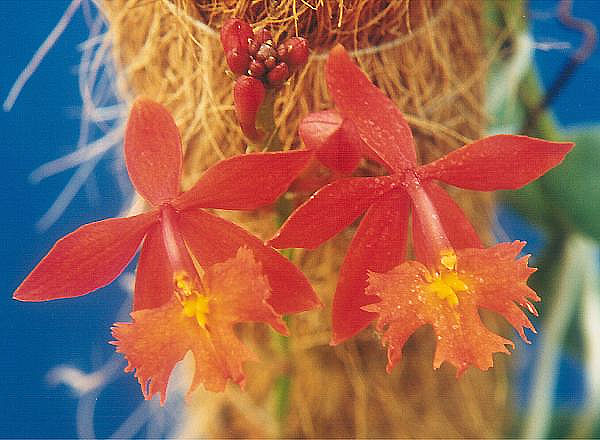
Epidendrum radicans

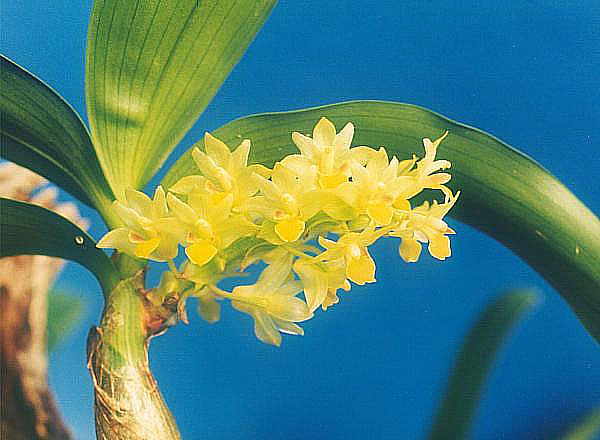
Eria stricta

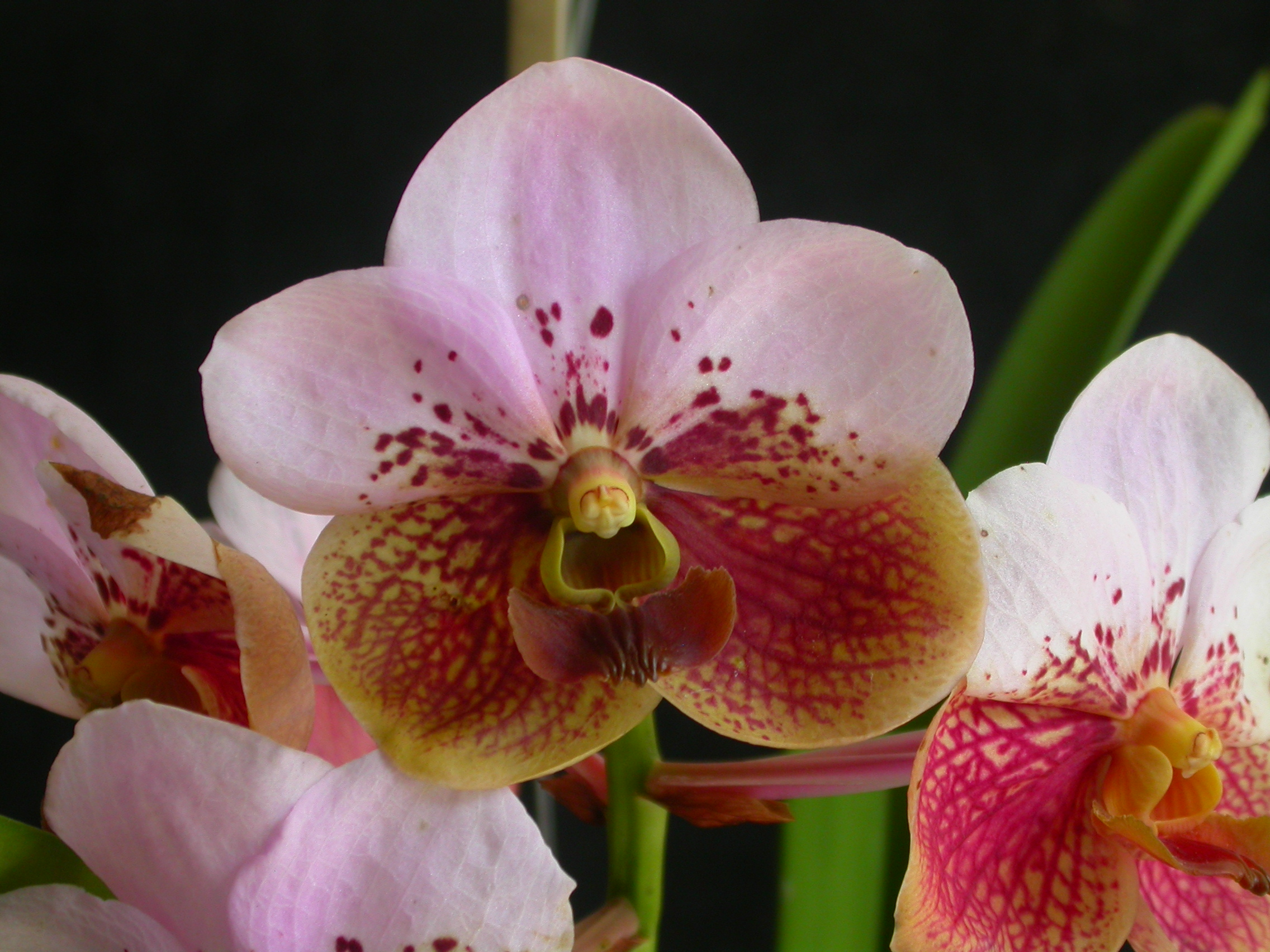
Vanda sanderiana (syn. Euanthe sanderiana)

- Earina Lindl.
- Echinorhyncha Dressler
- Echinosepala Pridgeon & M.W.Chase
- Eclecticus P.O'Byrne
- Eggelingia Summerh.
- Eleorchis F.Maek.
- Elleanthus C.Presl. – tiger orchid, praying-virgin
- Eloyella P.Ortiz – synonym of Dunstervillea Garay
- Eltroplectris Raf. – long-claw orchid
- Elythranthera (Endl.) A.S.George – synonym of Caladenia R.Br.
- Embreea Dodson
- Encyclia Hook. – butterfly orchid
- Entomophobia de Vogel – synonym of Coelogyne Lindl.
- Ephippianthus Rchb.f.
- Epiblastus Schltr.
- Epiblema R.Br.
- Epidendrum L. – star orchid
- Epipactis Zinn – helleborine
- Epipogium Borkh.
- Epistephium Kunth
- Erasanthe P.J.Cribb, Hermans & D.L.Roberts
- Eria Lindl.
- Eriaxis Rchb.f.
- Eriochilus R.Br.
- Eriodes Rolfe
- Eriopsis Lindl.
- Erycina Lindl.
- Erythrodes Blume – false helmet orchids
- Erythrorchis Blume
- Espinhassoa Salazar & J.A.N.Bat.
- Eulophia R.Br. – Wildcoco
- Euryblema Dressler
- Eurycentrum Schltr.
- Eurychone Schltr.
- Eurystyles Wawra – custard orchid
- Evotella Kurzweil & H.P.Linder

=== F ===
- Fernandezia Ruiz & Pav.
- Frondaria Luer
- Fuertesiella Schltr.
- Funkiella Schltr.

=== G ===
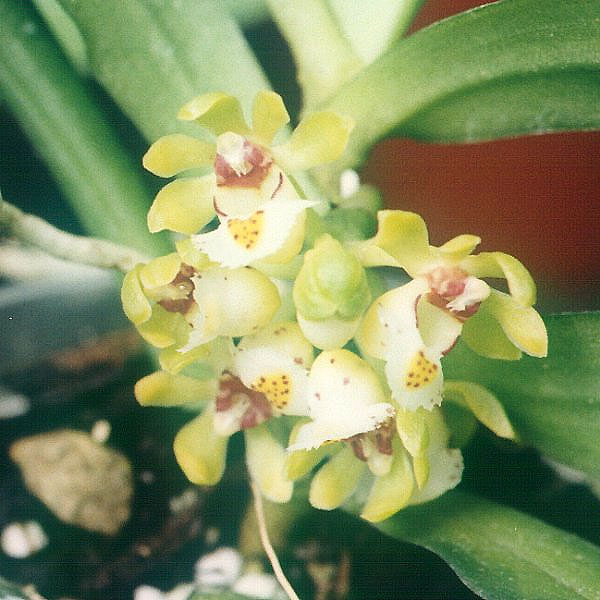
Gastrochilus japonicus

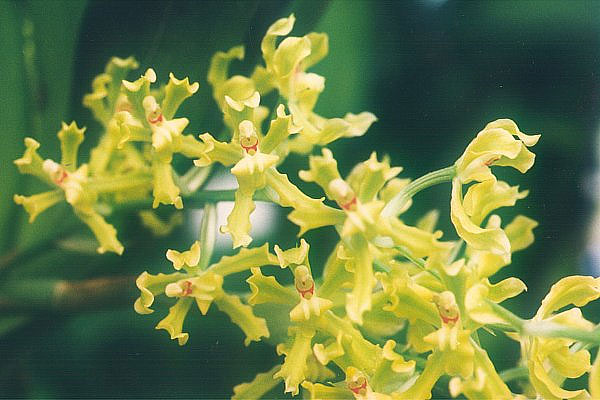
Gomesa crispa

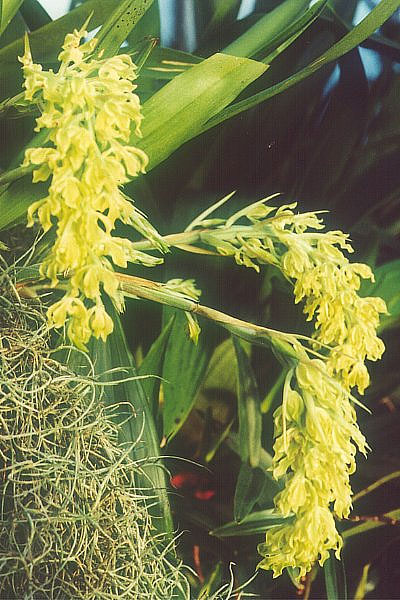
Gomesa recurva

- Galeandra Lindl. – hooded orchid
- Galearis Raf. – showy orchid
- Galeoglossum A.Rich. & Galeotti
- Galeola Lour.
- Galeottia A.Rich.
- Galeottiella Schltr.
- Gastrochilus D.Don
- Gastrodia R.Br.
- Gavilea Poepp.
- Gennaria Parl.
- Genoplesium R.Br.
- Geodorum Andrews – synonym of Eulophia R.Br.
- Glomera Blume
- Glossodia R.Br. – synonym of Caladenia R.Br.
- Gomesa R.Br.
- Gomphichis Lindl.
- Gonatostylis Schltr.
- Gongora Ruiz & Pav.
- Goodyera R.Br. – rattlesnake plantain
- Govenia Lindl. – govenia
- Grammangis Rchb.f.
- Grammatophyllum Blume
- Grandiphyllum Docha Neto – synonym of Trichocentrum Poepp. & Endl.
- Graphorkis Thouars
- Gravendeelia Bogarín & Karremans
- Greenwoodiella Salazar, Hern.-López & J.Sharma
- Grobya Lindl.
- Grosourdya Rchb.f.
- Guanchezia G.A.Romero & Carnevali – synonym of Bifrenaria Lindl.
- Guarianthe Dressler & W.E.Higgins
- Gunnarella Senghas – synonym of Bogoria J.J.Sm.
- Gymnadenia R.Br. – fragrant orchid
- × Gymnanacamptis Asch. & Graebn. (Anacamptis × Gymnadenia)
- × Gymnotraunsteinera Cif. & Giacom. (Gymnadenia × Traunsteinera)
- × Gymplatanthera L.C.Lamb. (Gymnadenia × Platanthera)
- Gynoglottis J.J.Sm. – synonym of Coelogyne Lindl.

=== H ===
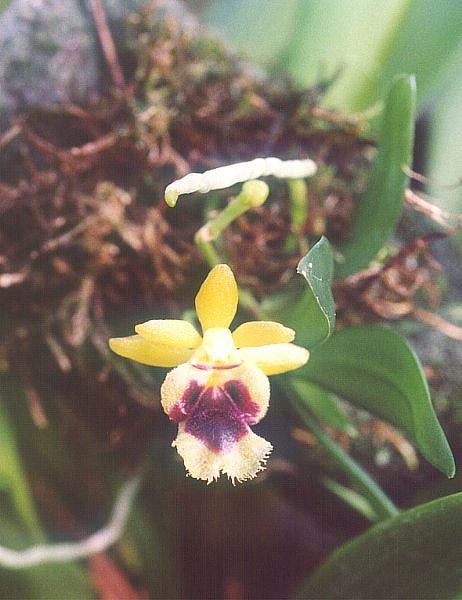
Haraella retrocalla

- Habenaria Willd. – bog orchid, false rein orchid
- Hagsatera R.González
- Halleorchis Szlach. & Olszewski
- Hammarbya Kuntze
- Hancockia Rolfe
- Hapalorchis Schltr.
- Hederorkis Thouars
- Helleriella A.D.Hawkes – dotted orchid
- Helonoma Garay
- Hemipilia Lindl.
- Herminium L.
- Herpysma Lindl.
- Hetaeria Blume
- Hexalectris Raf. – crested coralroot – synonym of Bletia Ruiz & Pav.
- Himantoglossum Spreng.
- Hintonella Ames
- Hippeophyllum Schltr. – synonym of Oberonia Lindl.
- Hoehneella Ruschi
- Hofmeisterella Rchb.f.
- Holcoglossum Schltr.
- × Holcosia J.M.H.Shaw (Holcoglossum × Luisia)
- Holothrix Rich. ex Lindl.
- Homalopetalum Rolfe
- Horichia Jenny
- Horvatia Garay – synonym of Bifrenaria Lindl.
- Houlletia Brongn.
- Hsenhsua X.H.Jin, Schuit. & W.T.Jin
- Huntleya Bateman ex Lindl.
- Huttonaea Harv.
- Hylophila Lindl.
- Hymenorchis Schltr.

=== I ===
- Ida A.Ryan & Oakeley
- Imerinaea Schltr.
- Ionopsis Kunth – violet orchid
- Ipsea Lindl.
- Isabelia Barb.Rodr.
- Ischnogyne Schltr. – synonym Coelogyne Lindl.
- Isochilus R.Br. – equal-lip orchid
- Isotria Raf. – fiveleaf orchid
- Ixyophora Dressler

=== J ===
- Jacquiniella Schltr. – tufted orchid
- Jejewoodia Szlach.
- Jumellea Schltr.

=== K ===
- Karma Karremans
- Kefersteinia Rchb.f.
- Kegeliella Mansf.
- Kionophyton Garay
- Kipandiorchis P.O'Byrne & Gokusing
- Koellensteinia Rchb.f. – grass-leaf orchid
- Kraenzlinella Kuntze – synonym of Acianthera Scheidw.
- Kuhlhasseltia J.J.Sm. – synonym of Odontochilus Blume
- Kylicanthe Descourv., Stévart & Droissart

=== L ===
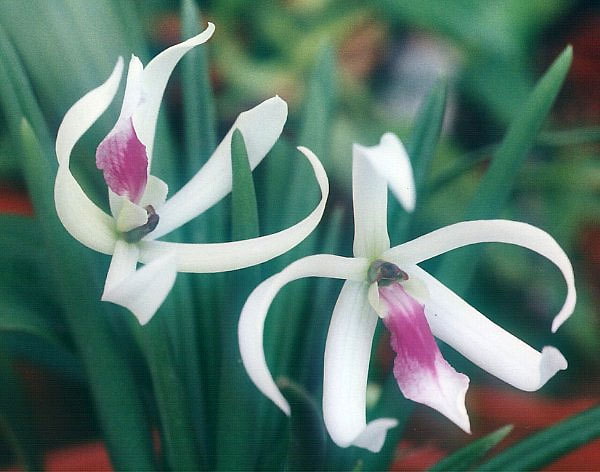
Leptotes bicolor

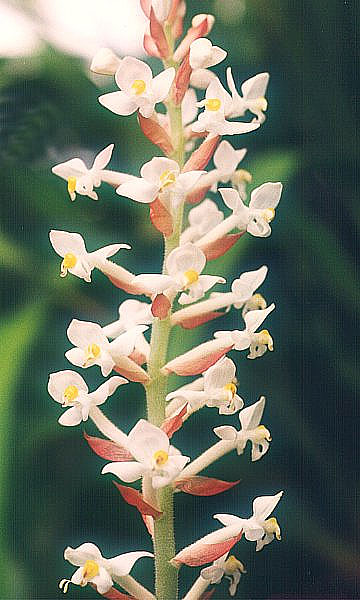
Ludisia discolor

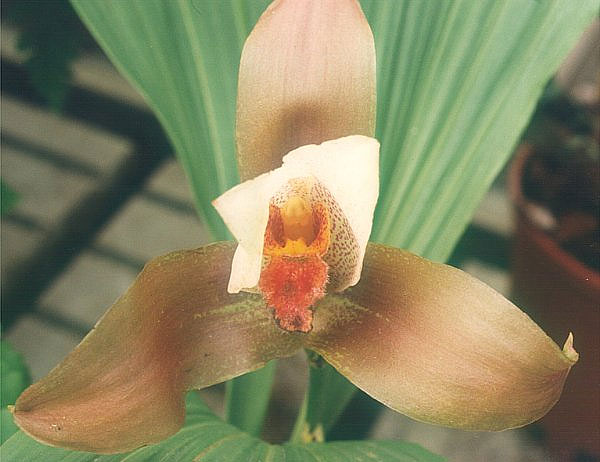
Lycaste Cassiopeia (a cultivar)

- Lacaena Lindl.
- Laelia Lindl.
- × Laeliocattleya Rolfe (Cattleya × Laelia)
- Lankesterella Ames
- Lankesteriana Karremans
- Lecanorchis Blume
- Lemurella Schltr.
- Lemurorchis Kraenzl.
- Leochilus Knowles & Westc. – smooth-lip orchid
- Lepanthes Sw. – babyboot orchid
- Lepanthopsis (Cogn.) Ames – tiny orchid
- Lepidogyne Blume
- Leporella A.S.George
- Leptoceras (R.Br.) Lindl.
- Leptotes Lindl.
- Limodorum Boehm.
- Liparis Rich. – wide-lip orchid
- Listrostachys Rchb.f.
- Lockhartia Hook.
- Loefgrenianthus Hoehne
- Ludisia A.Rich. – jewel orchid
- Lueckelia Jenny
- Lueddemannia Linden and Rchb.f.
- Luisia Gaudich.
- × Lycamerlycaste J.M.H.Shaw (Lycaste × Sudamerlycaste)
- Lycaste Lindl. – bee orchid
- × Lycida Oakeley (Ida × Lycaste)
- Lycomormium Rchb.f.
- Lyperanthus R.Br.
- Lyroglossa Schltr.

=== M ===
Macodes lowii

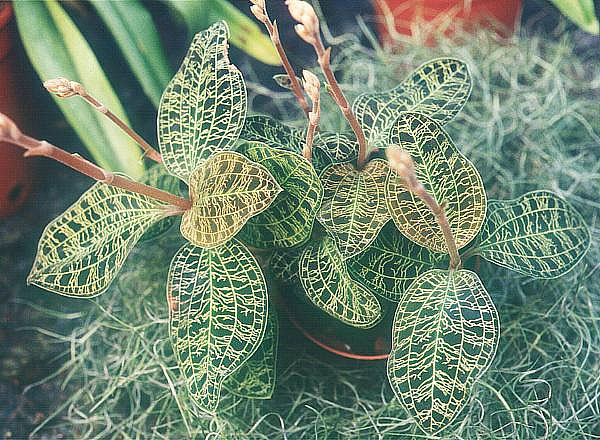
Macodes petola

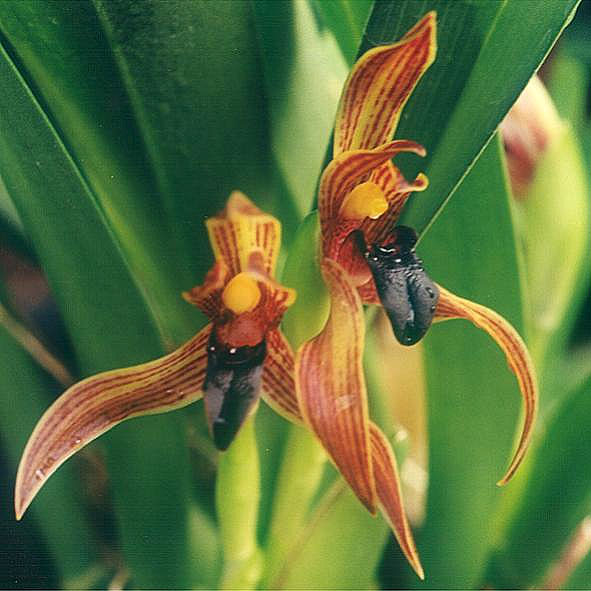
Maxillaria cucullata

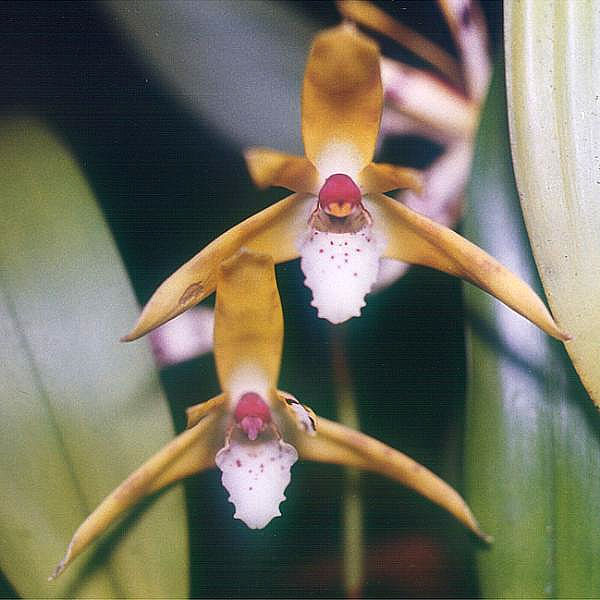
Maxillaria picta

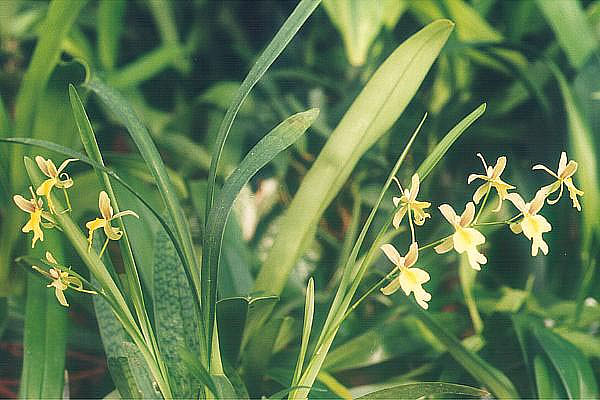
Mexicoa ghiesbrechtiana

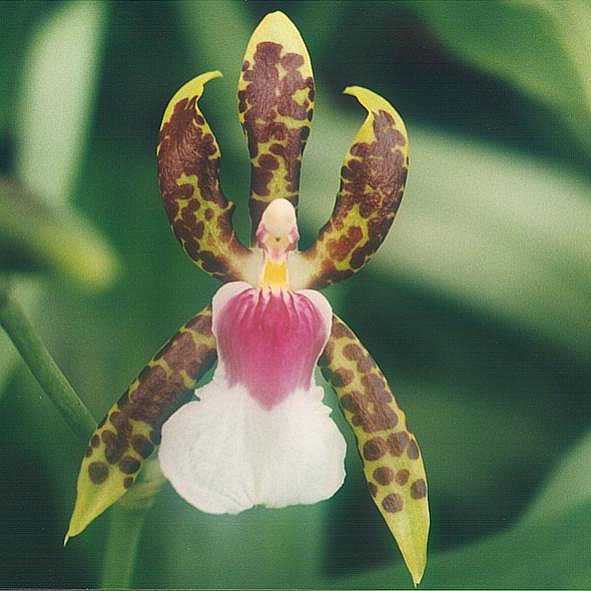
Oncidium schroederianum

- Macodes Lindl.
- Macradenia R.Br. – long-gland orchid
- Macroclinium Barb.Rodr.
- Macropodanthus L.O.Williams
- Madisonia Luer
- Malaxis Sol. ex Sw. – adder's mouth orchid
- Manniella Rchb.f.
- Masdevallia Ruiz & Pav.
- Maxillaria Ruiz & Pav. – tiger orchid, flame orchid
- Mediocalcar J.J.Sm.
- Megalorchis H.Perrier
- Megastylis (Schltr.) Schltr.
- Meiracyllium Rchb.f.
- †Meliorchis extinct, 80-million-year-old orchid
- Mengzia W.C.Huang, Z.J.Liu & C.Hu
- Mesadenella Pabst & Garay
- Mesadenus Schltr. – ladies'-tresses
- Mexipedium V.A.Albert & M.W.Chase
- Microchilus C.Presl.
- Microcoelia Lindl.
- Microepidendrum Brieger ex W.E.Higgins
- Micropera Lindl.
- Microsaccus Blume
- Microthelys Garay
- Microtis R.Br.
- Miltonia Lindl.
- × Miltonidium C.H.Curtis (Miltonia × Oncidium)
- Miltoniopsis God.-Leb. -pansy orchid
- Mobilabium Rupp
- Monophyllorchis Schltr.
- Mormodes Lindl.
- Mycaranthes Blume
- Myoxanthus Poepp. & Endl.
- Myrmechis Blume – synonym of Odontochilus Blume
- × Myrmecolaelia F.Hanb. ex Rolfe (Laelia × Myrmecophila)
- Myrmecophila Rolfe
- Myrosmodes Rchb.f.
- Mystacidium Lindl.

=== N ===
- Nabaluia Ames – synonym of Coelogyne Lindl.
- Nemaconia Knowles & Westc.
- Neobathiea Schltr.
- Neobolusia Schltr.
- Neocogniauxia Schltr.
- Neogardneria Schltr. ex Garay
- Neogyna Rchb.f. – synonym of Coelogyne Lindl.
- Neomoorea Rolfe
- × Neotinacamptis J.M.H.Shaw (Anacamptis × Neotinea)
- × Neotinarhiza J.M.H.Shaw (Dactylorhiza × Neotinea)
- Neotinea Rchb.f.
- Neottia Guett.
- Nephelaphyllum Blume
- Nephrangis (Schltr.) Summerh.
- Nervilia Comm. ex Gaudich.
- Neuwiedia Blume
- Nidema Britton & Millsp. – fairy orchid
- Nohawilliamsia M.W.Chase & Whitten
- Nothostele Garay
- Notylia Lindl.
- Notyliopsis P.Ortiz

=== O ===
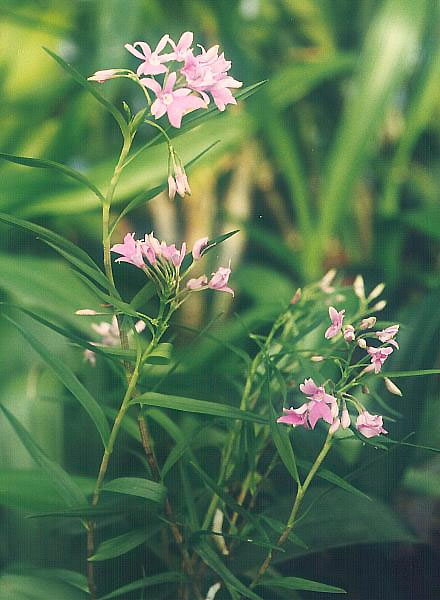
Oerstedella centropetalla

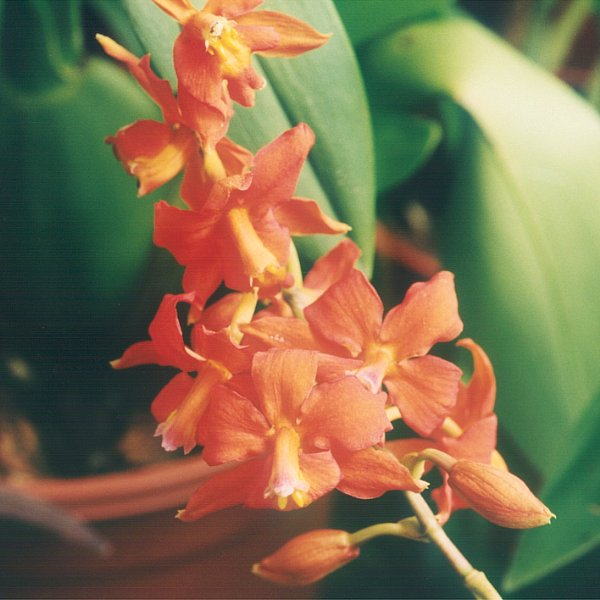
Oncidium noezlianum

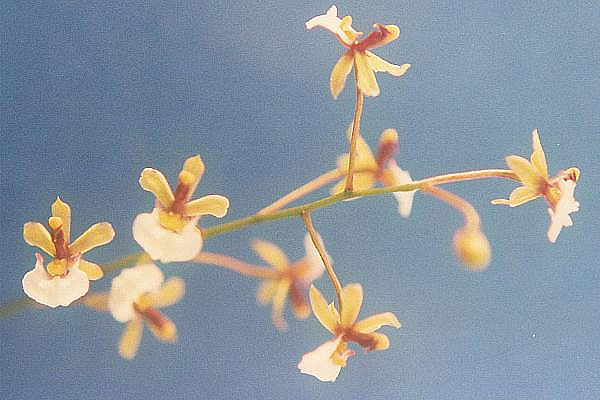
Ornithophora radicans

- Oberonia Lindl.
- Oberonioides Szlach.
- Octarrhena Thwaites
- Octomeria R.Br.
- Odontochilus Blume
- Odontorrhynchus M.N.Correa
- Oeceoclades Lindl. – synonym of Eulophia R.Br. – monk orchid
- Oeonia Lindl.
- Oeoniella Schltr.
- Oestlundia W.E.Higgins
- Oligophyton H.P.Linder
- Oliveriana Rchb.f.
- Omoea Blume
- Oncidium Sw. – dancing-lady orchid
- Ophidion Luer
- Ophioglossella Schuit. & Ormerod
- Ophrys L. – ophrys
- Opilionanthe Karremans & Bogarín
- × Orchidactylorhiza Soó & Borsos (Dactylorhiza × Orchis)
- × Orchigymnadenia E.G.Camus (Gymnadenia × Orchis)
- × Orchimantoglossum Asch. & Graebn. (Himantoglossum × Orchis)
- × Orchinea J.M.H.Shaw (Neotinea × Orchis)
- Orchipedum Breda
- × Orchiplatanthera E.G.Camus (Orchis × Platanthera)
- Orchis Tourn. ex L. – orchis
- Oreorchis Lindl.
- Orestias Ridl.
- Orleanesia Barb.Rodr.
- Ornithocephalus Hook.
- Orthoceras R.Br.
- Otochilus Lindl. – synonym of Coelogyne Lindl.
- Otoglossum (Schltr.) Garay & Dunst.
- Otostylis Schltr.
- Oxystophyllum Blume

=== P ===
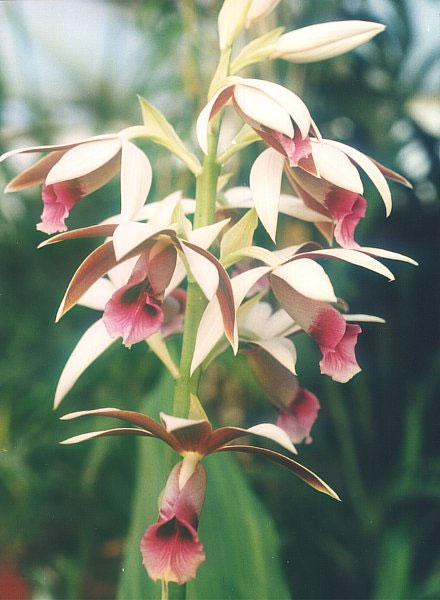
Phaius tankervilleae

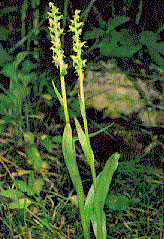
Northern green orchid (Platanthera hyperborea)

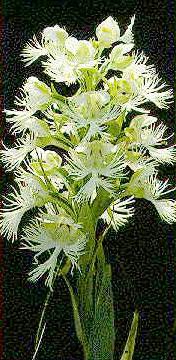
Western prairie fringed orchid (Platanthera praeclara)

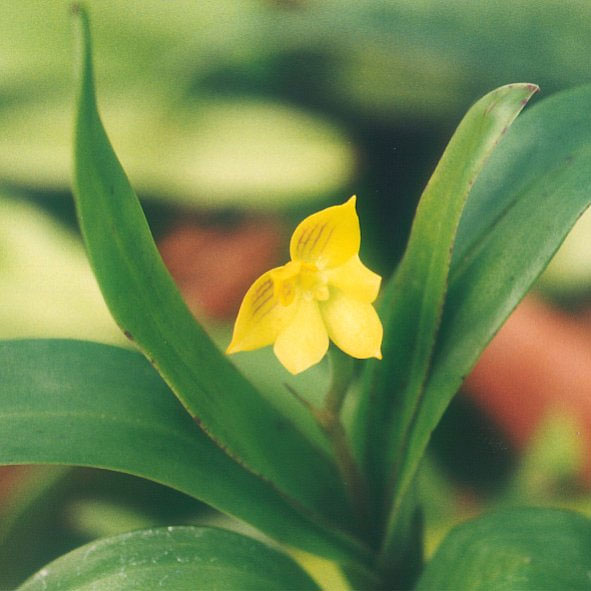
Polystachya pubescens

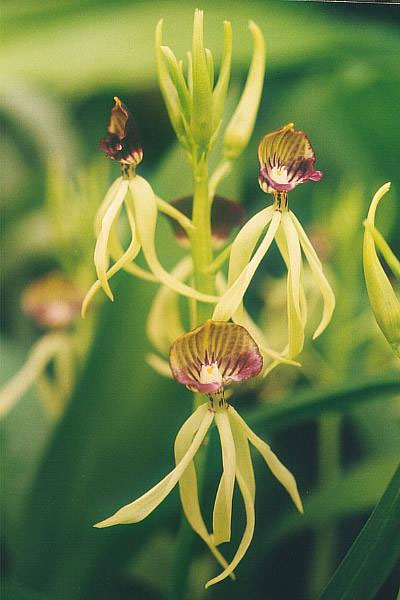
Prosthechea cochleata

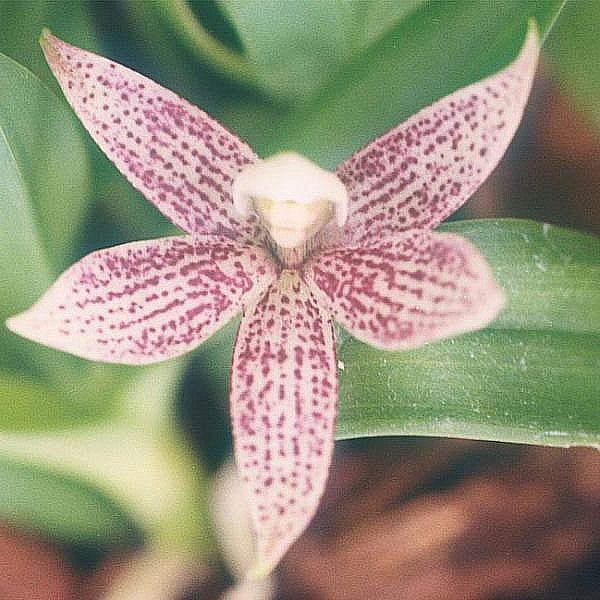
Prosthechea garciana

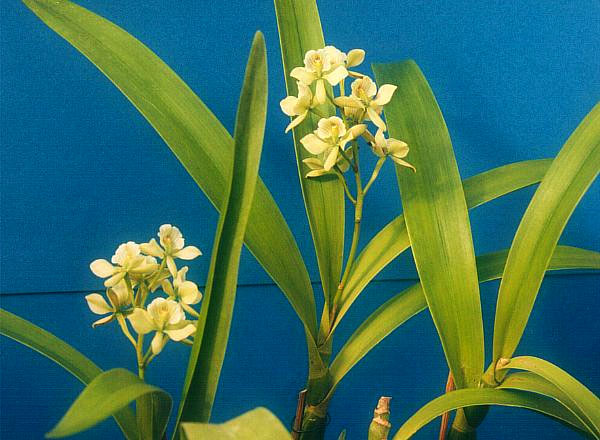
Prosthechea radiata

- Pabstia Garay
- Pabstiella Brieger & Senghas
- Pachites Lindl.
- Pachyplectron Schltr.
- Pachystoma Blume
- Palmorchis Barb.Rodr.
- Panisea (Lindl.) Lindl. – synonym of Coelogyne Lindl.
- Paphinia Lindl.
- Paphiopedilum Pfitzer – Venus' slipper
- Papilionanthe Schltr.
- Papillilabium Dockrill – synonym of Plectorrhiza Dockrill
- Papuaea Schltr.
- Paradisanthus Rchb.f.
- Paraphalaenopsis A.D.Hawkes
- Pecteilis Raf.
- Pelatantheria Ridl.
- Pelexia Poit. ex Lindl. – hachuela
- Pendusalpinx Karremans & Mel.Fernández
- Pennilabium J.J.Sm.
- Peristeranthus T.E.Hunt
- Peristeria Hook.
- Peristylus Blume
- Pescatoria Rchb.f.
- Phaius Lour. – nun's-hood orchid – synonym of Calanthe R.Br.
- Phalaenopsis Blume – moth orchid
- Pheladenia D.L.Jones & M.A.Clem.
- Phloeophila Hoehne & Schltr.
- Pholidota Lindl. – synonym of Coelogyne Lindl.
- Phragmipedium Rolfe
- Phragmorchis L.O.Williams
- Phreatia Lindl.
- Phymatidium Lindl.
- Physogyne Garay
- Pilophyllum Schltr.
- Pinalia Lindl.
- Piperia Rydb. – rein orchid – synonym of Platanthera Rich.
- Platanthera Rich. – fringed orchid, bog orchid
- Platycoryne Rchb.f.
- Platylepis A.Rich.
- Platyrhiza Barb.Rodr.
- Platystele Schltr.
- Plectorrhiza Dockrill
- Plectrelminthus Raf.
- Plectrophora H.Focke
- Pleione D.Don
- Pleurothallis R.Br. – bonnet orchid
- Pleurothallopsis Porto & Brade
- Plocoglottis Blume
- Poaephyllum Ridl.
- Podangis Schltr.
- Podochilus Blume
- Pogonia Juss. – snake-mouth orchid
- Pogoniopsis Rchb.f.
- Polycycnis Rchb.f.
- Polyotidium Garay
- Polystachya Hook.
- Pomatocalpa Breda
- Ponera Lindl.
- Ponthieva R.Br. – shadow witch
- Porpax Lindl.
- Porphyroglottis Ridl.
- Porphyrostachys Rchb.f.
- Porroglossum Schltr.
- Porrorhachis Garay
- Praecoxanthus Hopper & A.P.Br.
- Prasophyllum R.Br.
- Prescottia Lindl. – Prescott orchid
- Pridgeonia Pupulin
- Promenaea Lindl.
- Prosthechea Knowles & Westc.
- × Pseudadenia P.F.Hunt (Gymnadenia × Pseudorchis)
- Pseuderia Schltr.
- × Pseudinium P.F.Hunt (Herminium × Pseudorchis)
- Pseudocentrum Lindl.
- Pseudogoodyera Schltr.
- Pseudolaelia Porto & Brade
- Pseudorchis Ség.
- × Pseudorhiza P.F.Hunt (Dactylorhiza × Pseudorchis)
- Pseudovanilla Garay
- Psilochilus Barb.Rodr. – ragged-lip orchid
- Psychilis Raf. – peacock orchid
- Psychopsiella Lückel & Braem
- Psychopsis Raf. – butterfly orchid
- × Psytonia J.M.H.Shaw (Broughtonia × Psychilis)
- Pterichis Lindl.
- Pteroceras Hasselt ex Hassk.
- Pteroglossa Schltr.
- Pterostemma Kraenzl.
- Pterostylis R.Br.
- Pterygodium Sw.
- Pupulinia Karremans & Bogarín
- Pygmaeorchis Brade
- Pyrorchis D.L.Jones & M.A.Clem.

=== Q ===
- Quechua Salazar & L.Jost
- Quekettia Lindl.
- Quisqueya Dod

=== R ===
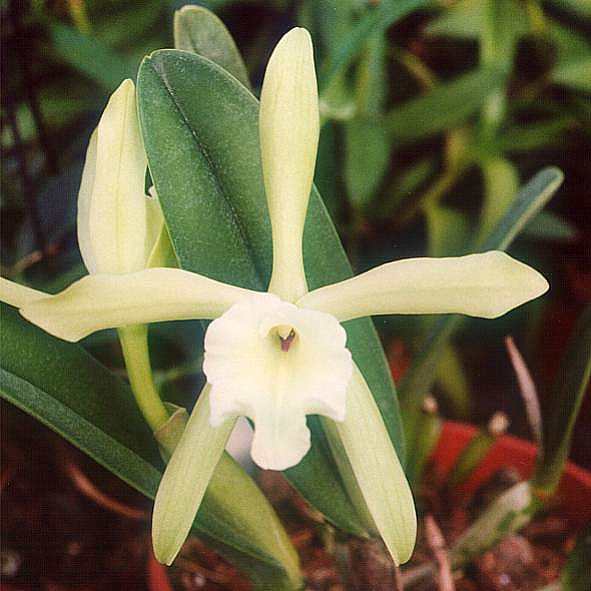
Rhyncholaelia glauca

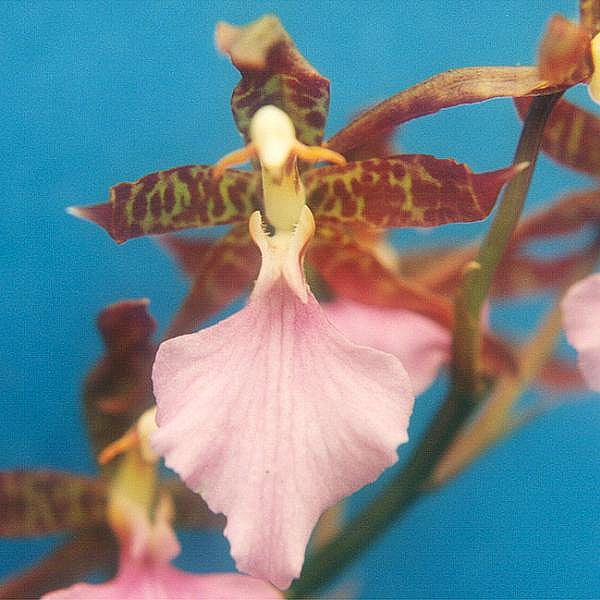
Rhynchostele bictoniensis

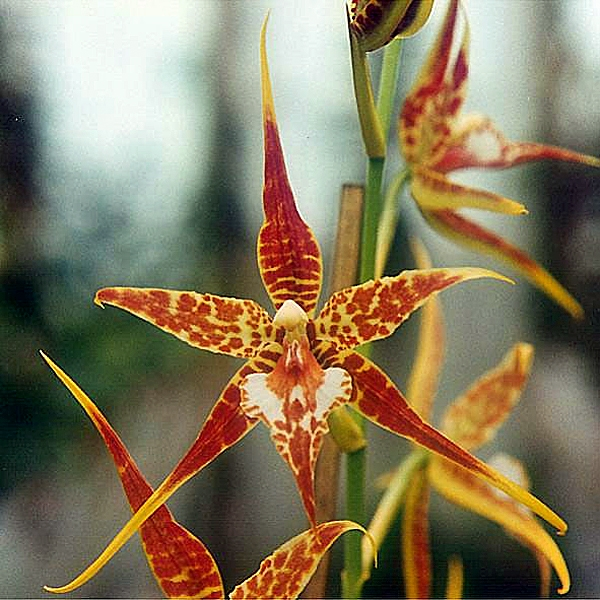
Rhynchostele cordatum

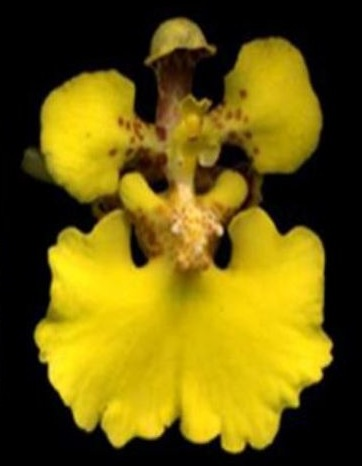
Rossioglossum ampliatum

- Rangaeris (Schltr.) Summerh.
- Rauhiella Pabst & Braga
- Renanthera Lour.
- Restrepia Kunth
- Restrepiella Garay & Dunst.
- Rhaesteria Summerh. – synonym of Rhipidoglossum Schltr.
- Rhinerrhiza Rupp
- Rhipidoglossum Schltr.
- Rhizanthella R.S.Rogers
- Rhomboda Lindl.
- Rhynchogyna Seidenf. & Garay
- Rhyncholaelia Schltr.
- Rhynchostele Rchb.f.
- Rhynchostylis Blume
- Ridleyella Schltr.
- Rimacola Rupp
- Risleya King & Pantl.
- Robiquetia Gaudich
- Rodriguezia Ruiz & Pav.
- Roeperocharis Rchb.f.
- Rossioglossum (Schltr.) Garay & G.C.Kenn.
- Rudolfiella Hoehne – synonym of Bifrenaria Lindl.

=== S ===
- Saccolabiopsis J.J.Sm.
- Saccolabium Blume
- Sacoila Raf. – terrestrial orchid
- Sanderella Kuntze
- Santotomasia Ormerod
- Sarcanthopsis Garay
- Sarcochilus R.Br.
- Sarcoglottis C.Presl.
- Sarcoglyphis Garay
- Sarcophyton Garay
- Satyrium Sw.
- Saundersia Rchb.f. – synonym of Trichocentrum Poepp. & Endl.
- Sauroglossum Lindl.
- Scaphosepalum Pfitzer
- Scaphyglottis Poepp. & Endl. – Malaysian orchid
- Schiedeella Schltr.
- Schizochilus Sond.
- Schlimia Planch. & Linden
- Schoenorchis Blume
- Schuitemania Ormerod
- Schunkea Senghas
- Scuticaria Lindl. – synonym of Bifrenaria Lindl.
- Seegeriella Senghas
- Seidenfadenia Garay
- Selenipedium Rchb.f.
- Serapias L.
- × Serapicamptis Godfery (Anacamptis × Serapias)
- × Serapirhiza Potucek (Dactylorhiza × Serapias)
- Sertifera Lindl. ex Rchb.f.
- Sievekingia Rchb.f.
- Silvorchis J.J.Sm.
- Sirhookera Kuntze
- Sirindhornia H.A.Pedersen & Suksathan
- Skeptrostachys Garay
- Smithsonia C.J.Saldanha
- Smitinandia Holttum
- Sobennikoffia Schltr.
- Sobralia Ruiz & Pav.
- Solenangis Schltr.
- Solenidium Lindl.
- Solenocentrum Schltr.
- Soterosanthus F.Lehm. ex Jenny
- Sotoa Salazar
- Spathoglottis Blume – ground orchid
- Specklinia Lindl.
- Sphyrarhynchus Mansf.
- Spiculaea Lindl.

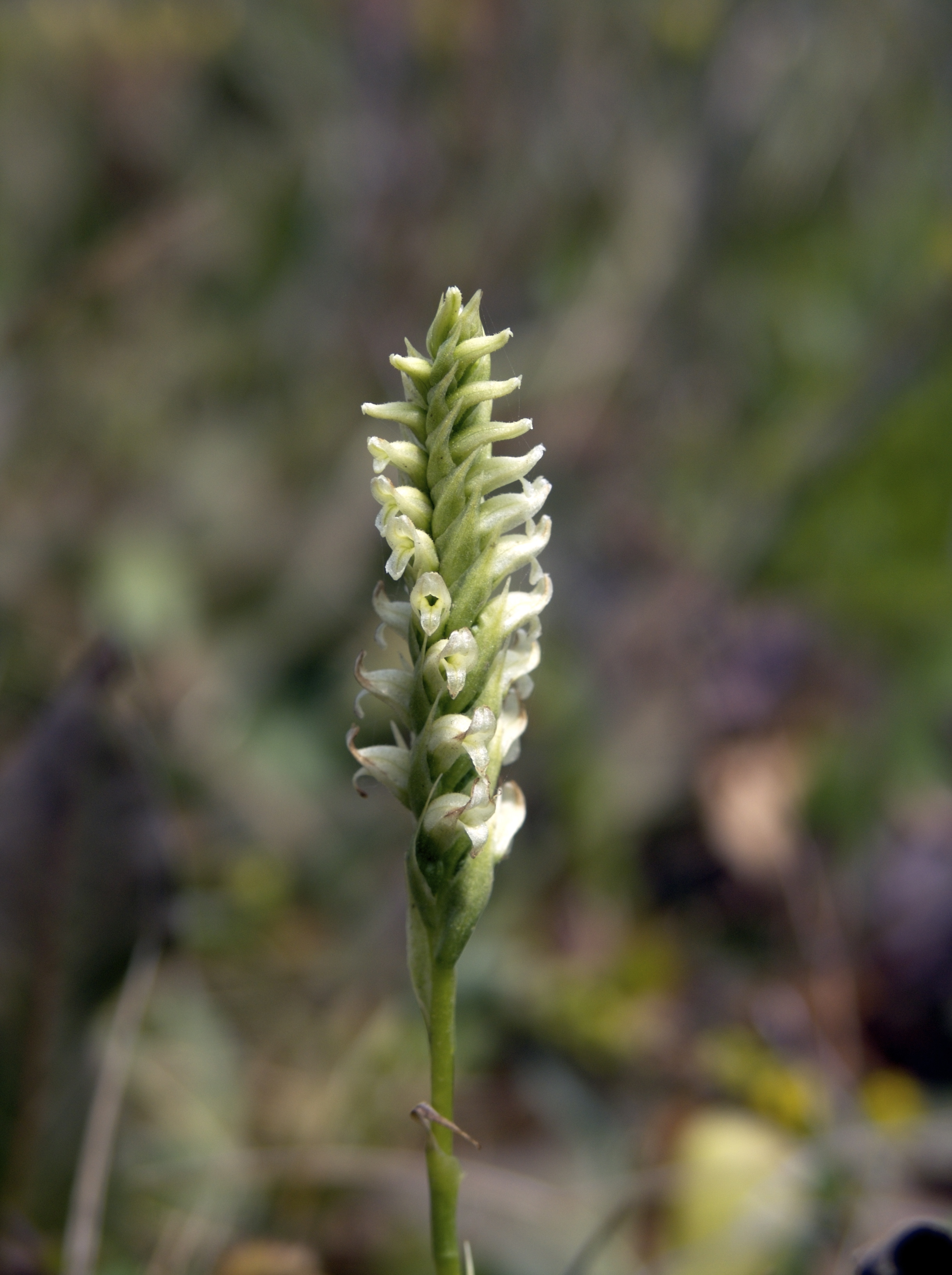
Spiranthes romanzoffiana

- Spiranthes Rich. ladies'-tresses
- Stalkya Garay
- Stanhopea J.Frost ex Hook.
- Stelis Sw. – leach orchid
- Stellamaris Mel.Fernández & Bogarín
- Stenia Lindl.
- Stenoglottis Lindl.
- Stenoptera C.Presl.
- Stenorrhynchos Rich. ex Spreng. – ladies'-tresses
- Stenotyla Dressler
- Stereochilus Lindl.
- Stereosandra Blume
- Steveniella Schltr.
- Stichorkis Thouars
- Stigmatodactylus Maxim. ex Makino
- Strongyleria (Pfitzer) Schuit., Y.P.Ng & H.A.Pedersen
- Suarezia Dodson
- Summerhayesia P.J.Cribb
- Sutrina Lindl.
- Svenkoeltzia Burns-Bal.
- Systeloglossum Schltr.

=== T ===
- Taeniophyllum Blume
- Taeniorrhiza Summerh. – synonym of Microcoelia Lindl.
- Tainia Blume
- Tamayorkis Szlach.
- Taprobanea Christenson
- Teagueia (Luer) Luer
- Telipogon Kunth
- Tetramicra Lindl. – wallflower orchid
- Teuscheria Garay – synonym of Bifrenaria Lindl.
- Thaia Seidenf.
- Thecopus Seidenf.
- Thecostele Rchb.f.
- Thelasis Blume
- Thelymitra J.R.Forst. & G.Forst.
- Thelyschista Garay
- Thrixspermum Lour.
- Thulinia P.J.Cribb
- Thunia Rchb.f.
- Thuniopsis L.Li, D.P.Ye & Shi J.Li
- Thysanoglossa Porto & Brade
- Tipularia Nutt. – crippled-cranefly
- Tolumnia Raf. – dancing-lady orchid, variegated orchid
- Tomzanonia Nir
- Townsonia Cheeseman
- Trachoma Garay
- Traunsteinera Rchb.
- Trevoria F.Lehm.
- Triceratorhynchus Summerh.
- Trichocentrum Poepp. & Endl.
- Trichoceros Kunth
- Trichoglottis Blume
- Trichopilia Lindl.
- Trichosalpinx Luer – bonnet orchid
- Trichotosia Blume
- Tridactyle Schltr.
- Triphora Nutt. – noddingcaps
- Trisetella Luer
- Trizeuxis Lindl.
- Tropidia Lindl. – palm orchid
- Tsaiorchis Tang & F.T.Wang
- Tuberolabium Yamam.
- Tylostigma Schltr.

=== U ===
- Uleiorchis Hoehne
- Uncifera Lindl.

=== V ===
- Vanda R.Br.
- × Vandoglossum Garay (Holcoglossum × Vanda)
- Vandopsis Pfitzer
- Vanilla Plum. ex Mill. – vanilla
- Vargasiella C.Schweinf.
- Vasqueziella Dodson
- Veyretella Szlach. & Olszewski
- Veyretia Szlach.
- Vitekorchis Romowicz & Szlach.
- Vrydagzynea Blume

=== W ===
- Waireia D.L.Jones, Molloy & M.A.Clem.
- Warczewiczella Rchb.f.
- Warrea Lindl.
- Warreella Schltr.
- Warreopsis Garay
- Wullschlaegelia Rchb.f. – leafless orchid

=== X ===
- Xerorchis Schltr.
- Xylobium Lindl.

=== Y ===
- Yoania Maxim.
- Ypsilopus Summerh.

=== Z ===
- Zelenkoa M.W.Chase & N.H.Williams
- Zeuxine Lindl. – soldier's orchid
- Zootrophion Luer
- Zygopetalum Hook.
- Zygosepalum Rchb.f.
- Zygostates Lindl.
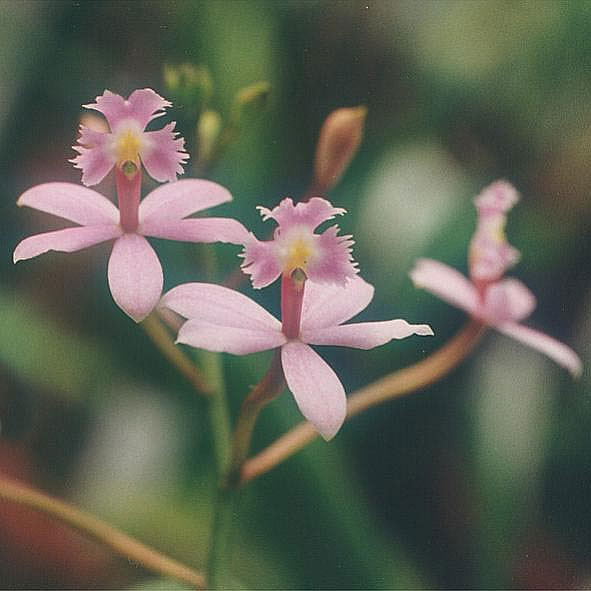
Epidendrum ibaguense

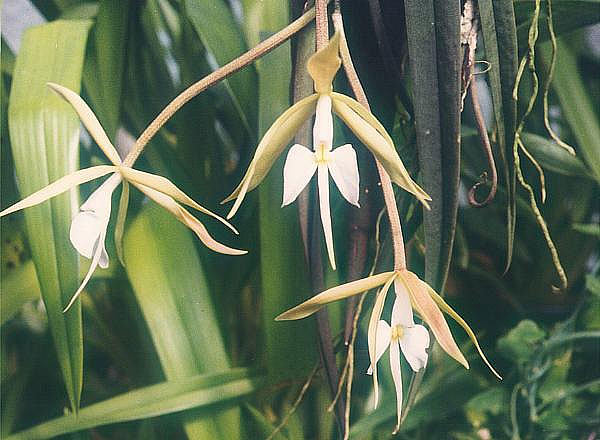
Epidendrum parkinsonianum

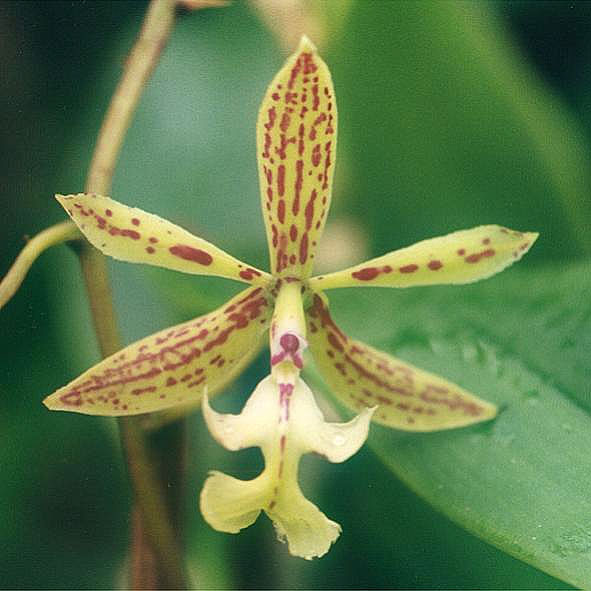
Epidendrum stamfordianum

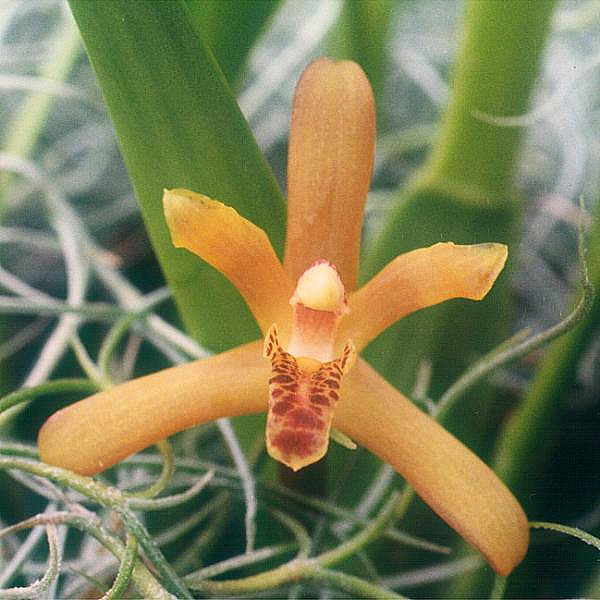
Maxillaria rufescens

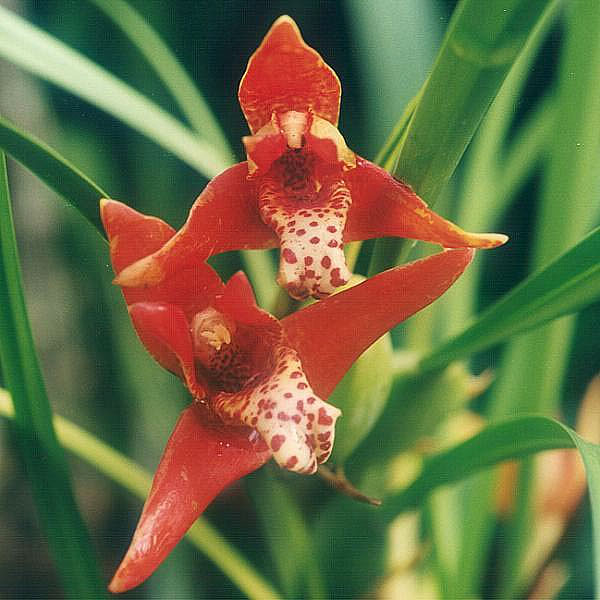
Maxillaria tenuifolia

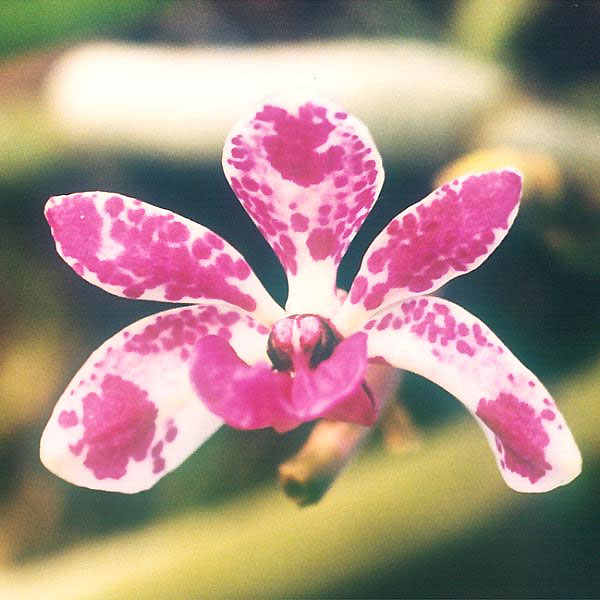
Rhynchostlis gigantea

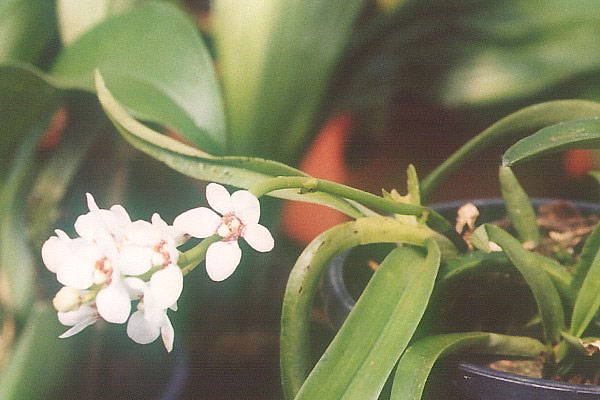
Sarcochilus hartmannii

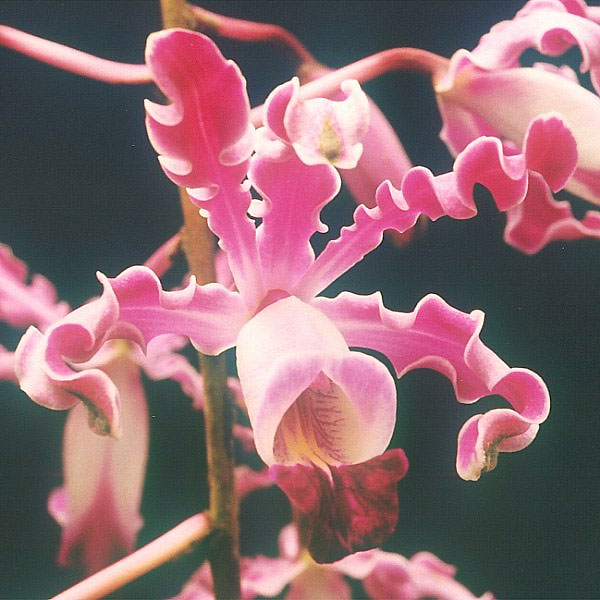
Schomburgkia undulata

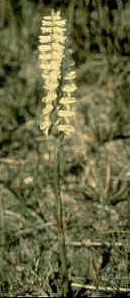
Late-flowering ladies'-tresses (Spiranthes magnicamporum)

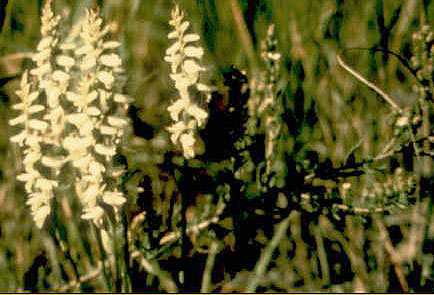
Nodding ladies'-tresses (Spiranthes cernua)

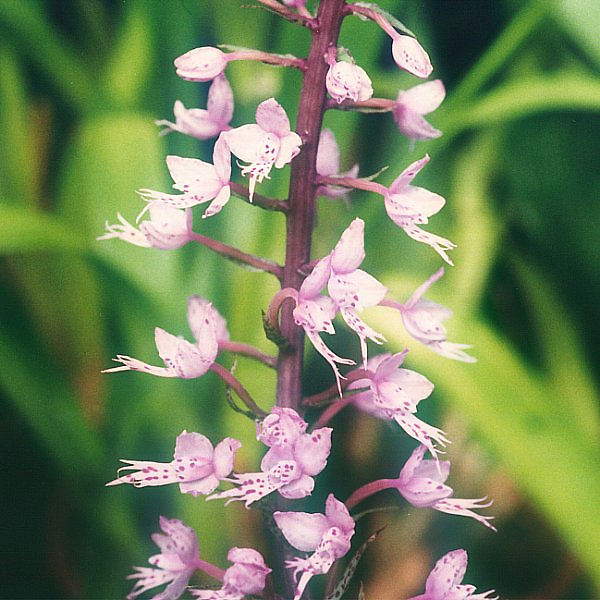
Stenoglottis longifolia

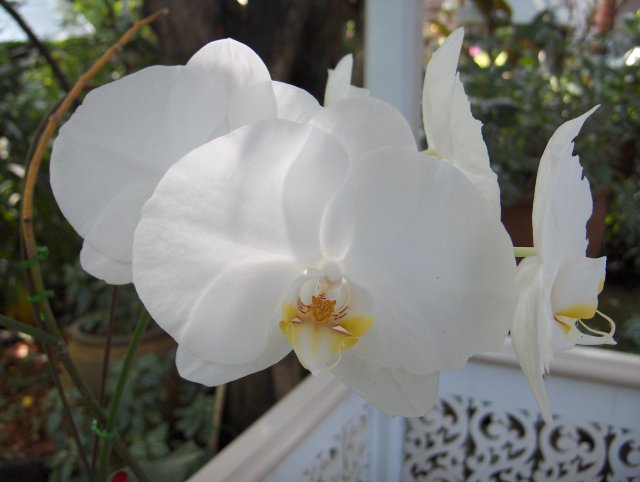
Moon orchid (Phalaenopsis amabilis)

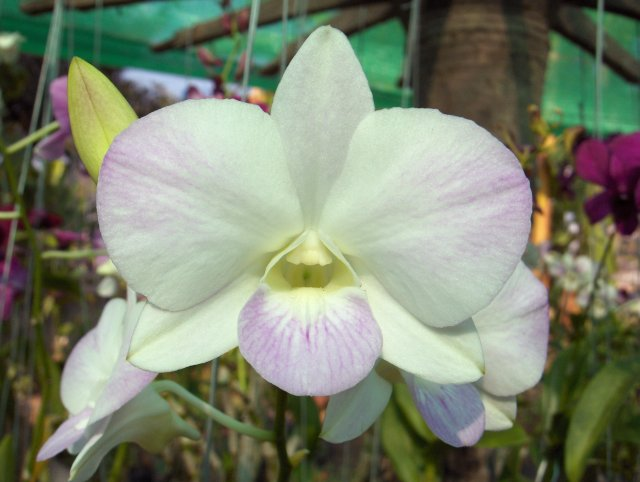
Dendrobium hybrid

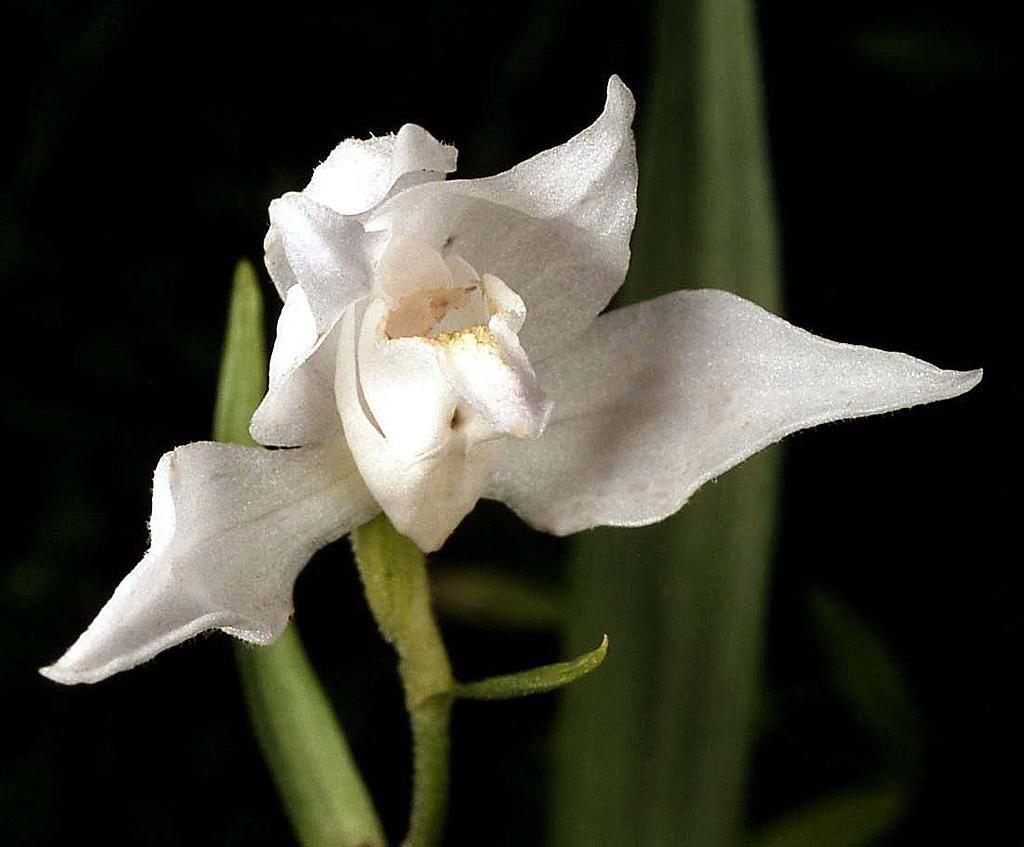
Phantom orchid (Cephalanthera rubra var. alba)

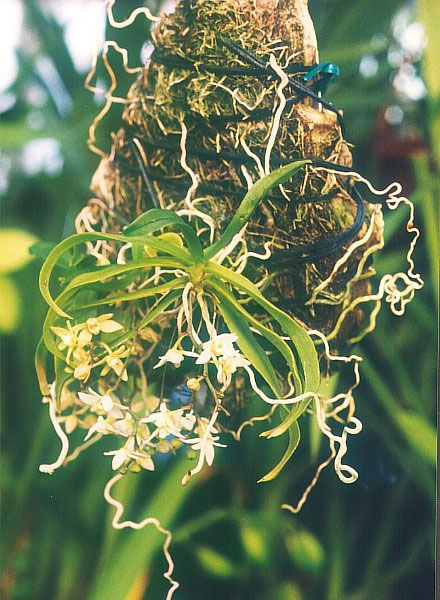
Thrixspermum saruwatarii

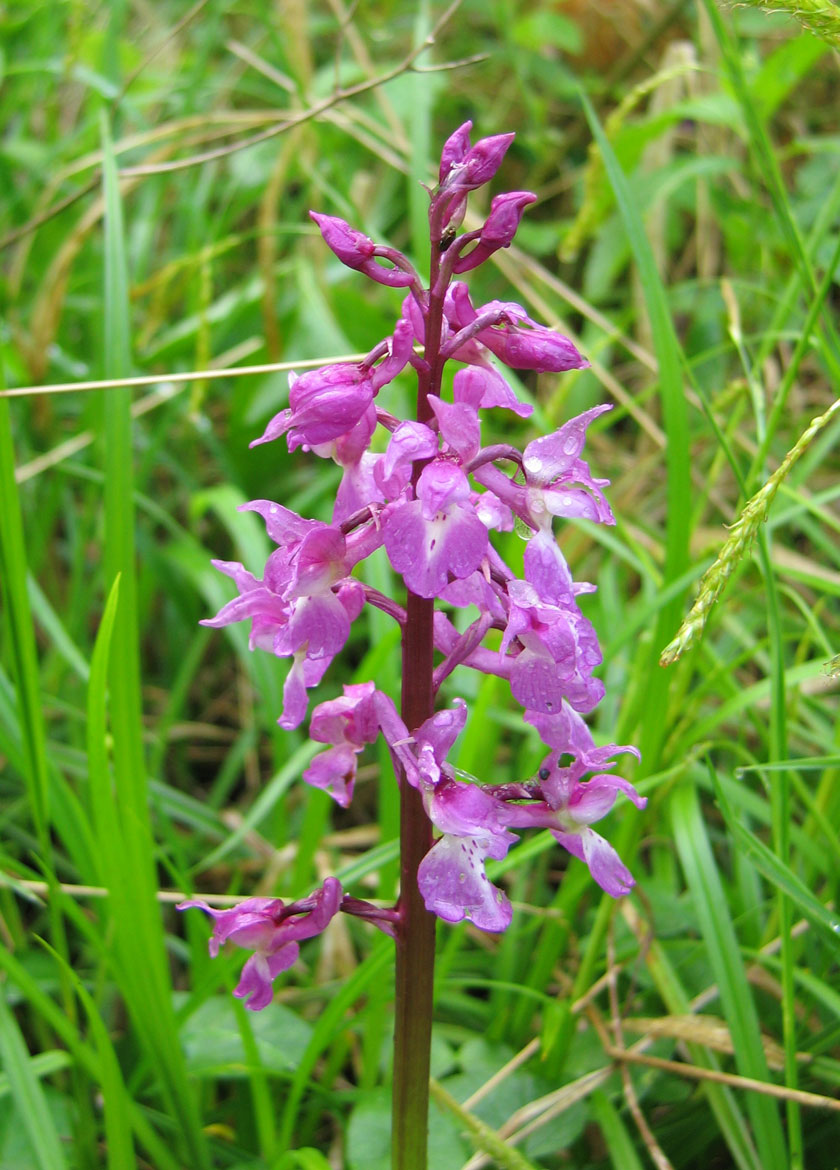
Early Purple orchid (Orchis mascula)
