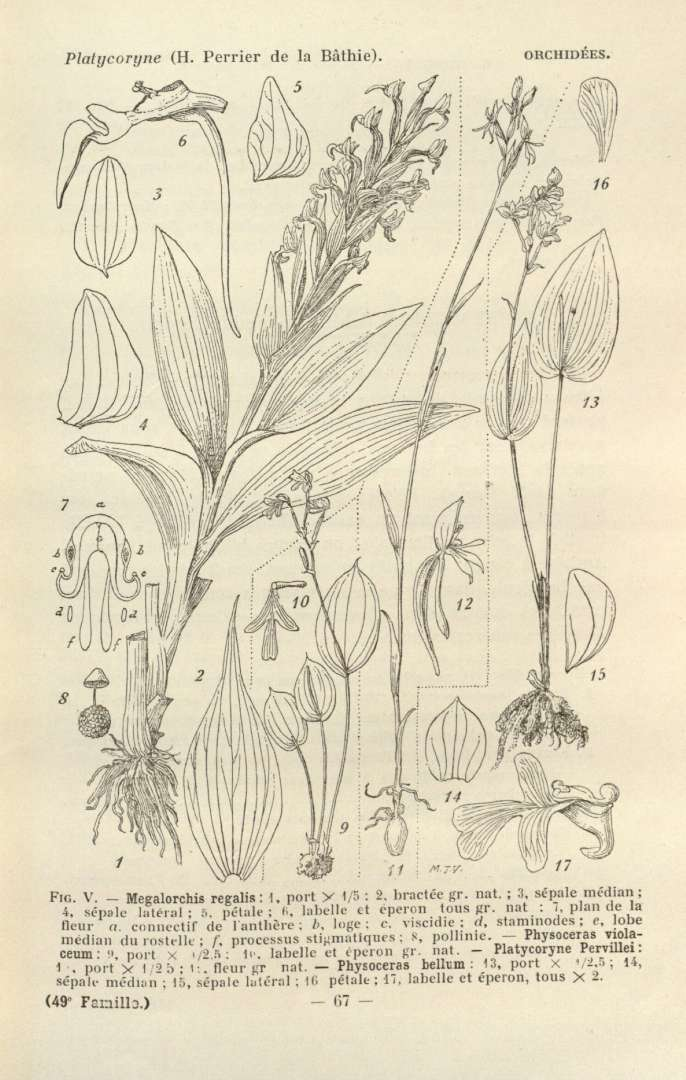
- Orchidees de Madagascar

Scientific classification
- Kingdom: Plantae
- Clade: Tracheophytes
- Clade: Angiosperms
- Clade: Monocots
- Order: Asparagales
- Family: Orchidaceae
- Subfamily: Orchidoideae
- Tribe: Orchideae
- Subtribe: Orchidinae
- Genus: Platycoryne; Rchb.f.

= Platycoryne =

Genus of flowering plants

Platycoryne is a genus of flowering plants from the orchid family, Orchidaceae, native to Africa and Madagascar.

- Platycoryne affinis Summerh. - Zimbabwe
- Platycoryne alinae Szlach. - Cameroon
- Platycoryne ambigua (Kraenzl.) Summerh. - Tanzania
- Platycoryne brevirostris Summerh. - Angola + Zambia
- Platycoryne buchananiana (Kraenzl.) Rolfe in D.Oliver - central Africa
- Platycoryne crocea Rolfe in D.Oliver - central + eastern Africa
- Platycoryne guingangae (Rchb.f.) Rolfe in D.Oliver - central Africa
- Platycoryne isoetifolia P.J.Cribb - Zaïre + Zambia
- Platycoryne latipetala Summerh. - Zaïre + Zambia
- Platycoryne lisowskiana Szlach. & Kras - Central African Republic
- Platycoryne macroceras Summerh. - Zaïre + Zambia
- Platycoryne mediocris Summerh. - southern + eastern Africa
- Platycoryne megalorrhyncha Summerh. - Nigeria + Cameroon
- Platycoryne micrantha Summerh. - Angola + Zambia
- Platycoryne ochyrana Szlach., Mytnik, Rutk., Jerch. & Baranow - Central African Republic
- Platycoryne paludosa (Lindl.) Rolfe in D.Oliver - western Africa
- Platycoryne pervillei Rchb.f. - eastern Africa + Madagascar
- Platycoryne protearum (Rchb.f.) Rolfe in D.Oliver - central Africa
- Platycoryne trilobata Summerh. - Angola + Zambia

== See also ==
- List of Orchidaceae genera
