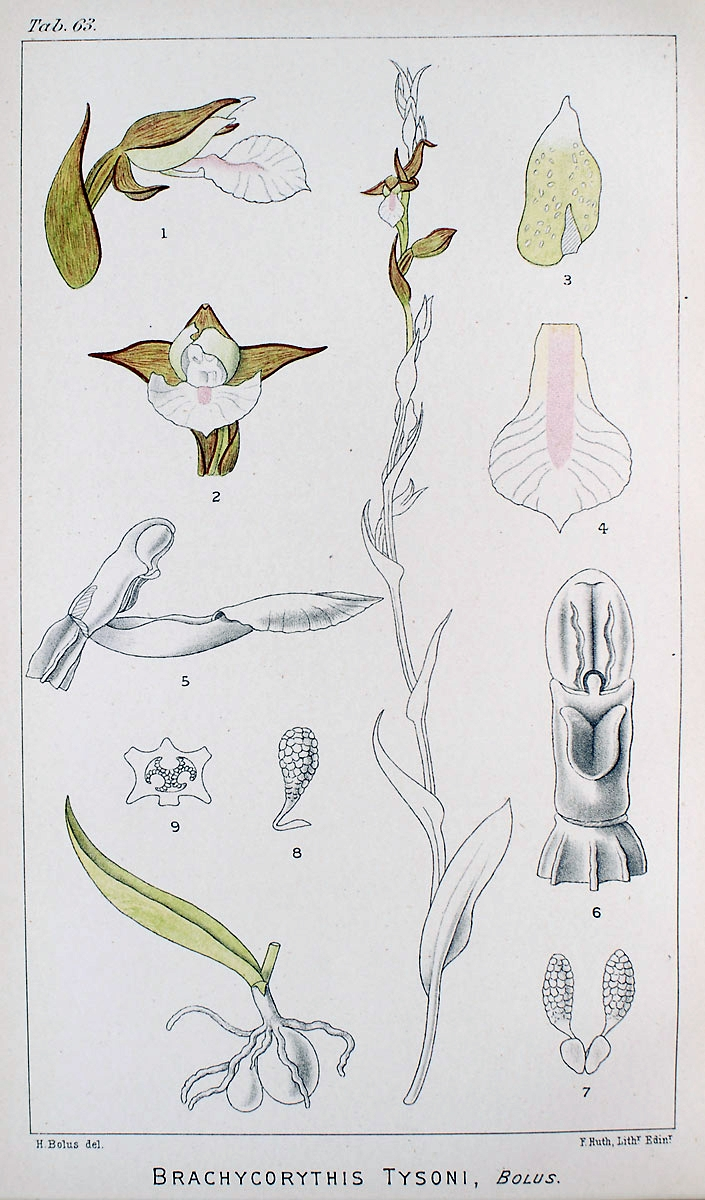

Scientific classification
- Kingdom: Plantae
- Clade: Tracheophytes
- Clade: Angiosperms
- Clade: Monocots
- Order: Asparagales
- Family: Orchidaceae
- Subfamily: Orchidoideae
- Tribe: Orchideae
- Subtribe: Orchidinae
- Genus: Neobolusia; Schltr.

= Neobolusia =

Genus of orchids

Neobolusia is a genus of flowering plants from the orchid family, Orchidaceae. It contains 3 known species, all native to eastern and southern Africa.

- Neobolusia ciliata Summerh. - Zimbabwe, Mozambique
- Neobolusia stolzii Schltr. - Zimbabwe, Tanzania
- Neobolusia tysonii (Bolus) Schltr. - Eswatini, Lesotho, South Africa

== See also ==
- List of Orchidaceae genera
