= Oligophyton =

Scientific classification
- Kingdom: Plantae
- Clade: Tracheophytes
- Clade: Angiosperms
- Clade: Monocots
- Order: Asparagales
- Family: Orchidaceae
- Subfamily: Orchidoideae
- Tribe: Orchideae
- Subtribe: Orchidinae
- Genus: Oligophyton; H.P.Linder
- Species: O. drummondii

Binomial name
- Oligophyton drummondii H.P.Linder & G.Will.

Synonyms
- Benthamia drummondii (H.P.Linder & G.Will.) Szlach. & Rutk.

Genus of orchids

Oligophyton is a genus of flowering plants from the orchid family, Orchidaceae. It contains only one known species, Oligophyton drummondii, endemic to the Chimanimani Mountains of Zimbabwe.

== See also ==
- List of Orchidaceae genera
