= Devogelia =

Scientific classification
- Kingdom: Plantae
- Clade: Tracheophytes
- Clade: Angiosperms
- Clade: Monocots
- Order: Asparagales
- Family: Orchidaceae
- Subfamily: Epidendroideae
- Genus: Devogelia; Schuit.
- Species: D. intonsa

Binomial name
- Devogelia intonsa Schuit.

Genus of orchids

Devogelia is a genus of flowering plants from the orchid family, Orchidaceae. As of June 2014, it contains only one known species, Devogelia intonsa, native to New Guinea and Maluku.

== See also ==
- List of Orchidaceae genera
