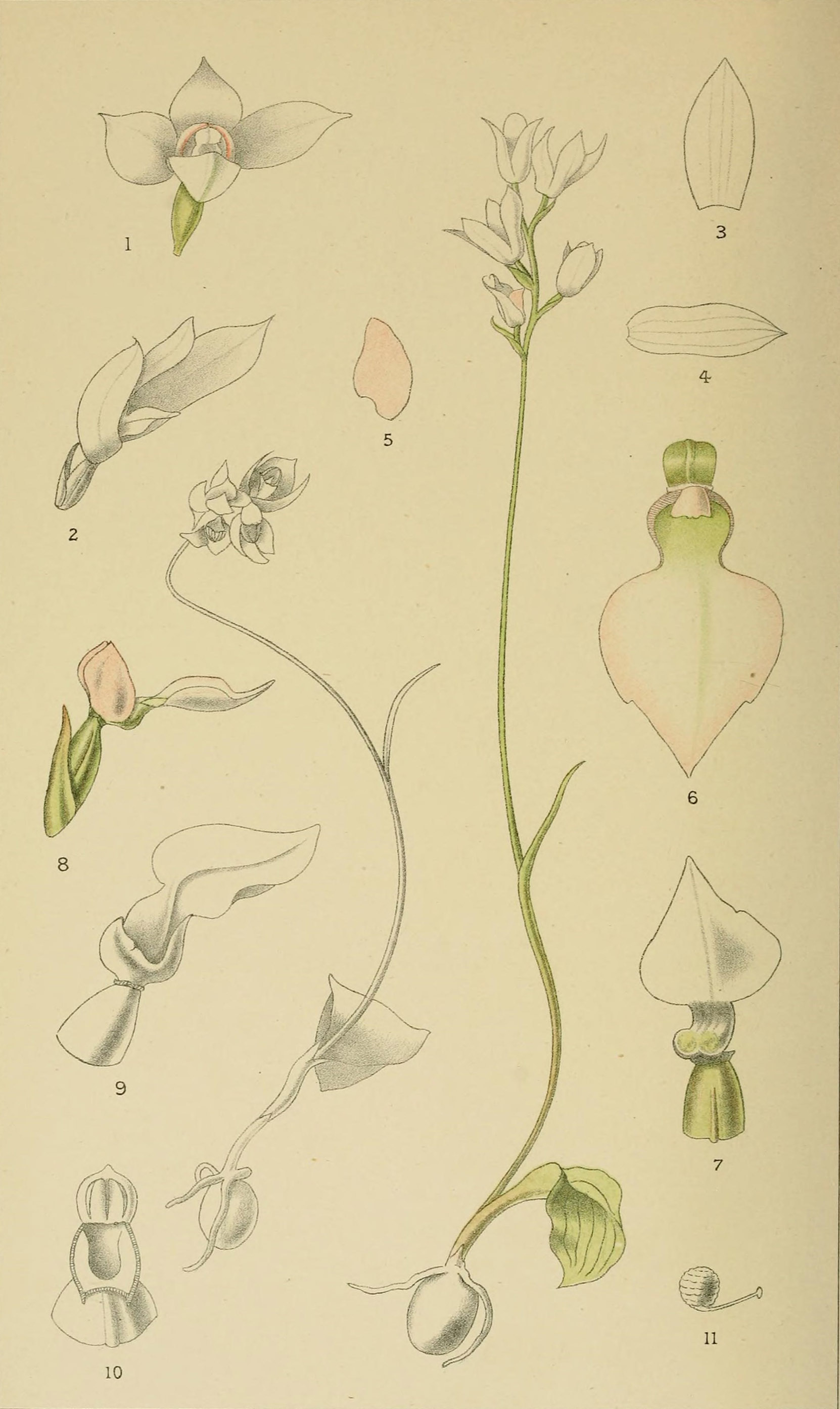
- Botanical illustration of Dracomonticola virginea by Harry Bolus

Scientific classification
- Kingdom: Plantae
- Clade: Tracheophytes
- Clade: Angiosperms
- Clade: Monocots
- Order: Asparagales
- Family: Orchidaceae
- Subfamily: Orchidoideae
- Tribe: Orchideae
- Subtribe: Orchidinae
- Genus: Dracomonticola; H.P.Linder & Kurzweil
- Species: D. virginea

Binomial name
- Dracomonticola virginea (Bolus) H.P.Linder & Kurzweil

Synonyms
- Platanthera virginea Bolus; Gymnadenia virginea (Bolus) Kraenzl.; Brachycorythis virginea (Bolus) Rolfe; Neobolusia virginea (Bolus) Schltr.

= Dracomonticola =

Genus of plants

Dracomonticola is a genus of flowering plants in the orchid family, Orchidaceae. It contains only one known species, Dracomonticola virginea, native to Lesotho and South Africa.

== See also ==
- List of Orchidaceae genera
