= Thulinia =

Scientific classification
- Kingdom: Plantae
- Clade: Tracheophytes
- Clade: Angiosperms
- Clade: Monocots
- Order: Asparagales
- Family: Orchidaceae
- Subfamily: Orchidoideae
- Tribe: Orchideae
- Subtribe: Orchidinae
- Genus: Thulinia; P.J.Cribb
- Species: T. albolutea

Binomial name
- Thulinia albolutea P.J.Cribb

Genus of orchids

Thulinia is a monotypic genus of flowering plants from the orchid family, Orchidaceae. The sole species is Thulinia albolutea, endemic to the Nguru Mountains of Tanzania.

== See also ==
- List of Orchidaceae genera
