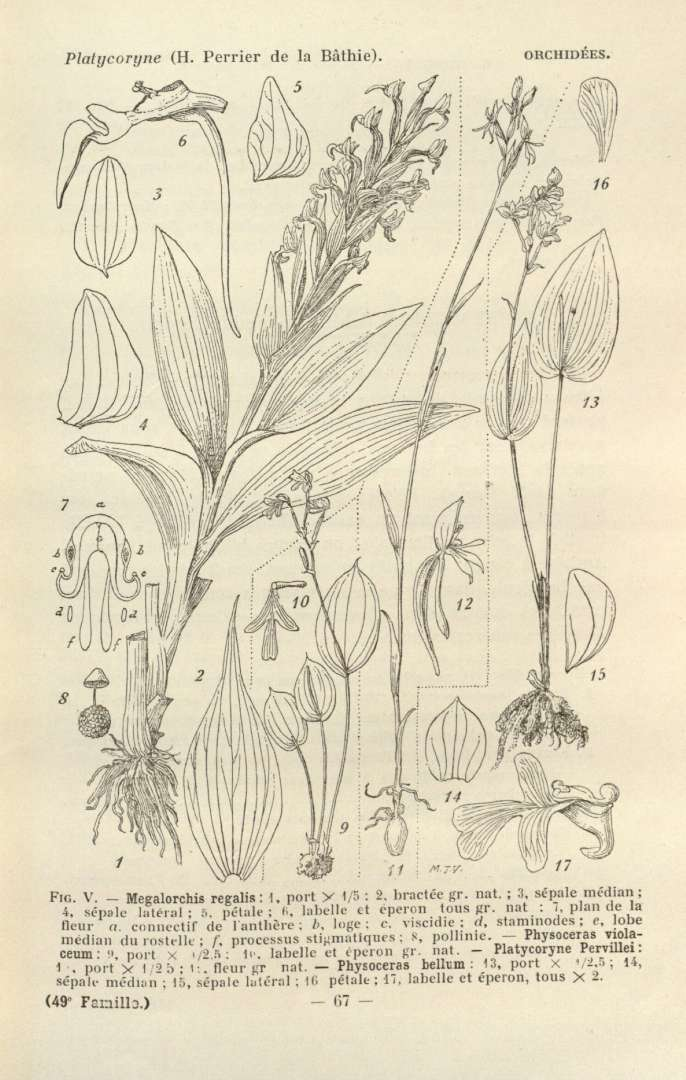
- Illustrations of Megalorchis regalis (on the left)

Scientific classification
- Kingdom: Plantae
- Clade: Tracheophytes
- Clade: Angiosperms
- Clade: Monocots
- Order: Asparagales
- Family: Orchidaceae
- Subfamily: Orchidoideae
- Tribe: Orchideae
- Subtribe: Orchidinae
- Genus: Megalorchis; H.Perrier
- Species: M. regalis

Binomial name
- Megalorchis regalis (Schltr.) H.Perrier

= Megalorchis =

Genus of orchids

Megalorchis is a genus of flowering plants from the orchid family, Orchidaceae.

It contains only 1 species:

- Megalorchis regalis (Schltr.) H.Perrier

== See also ==
- List of Orchidaceae genera
