= Veyretella =

Scientific classification
- Kingdom: Plantae
- Clade: Tracheophytes
- Clade: Angiosperms
- Clade: Monocots
- Order: Asparagales
- Family: Orchidaceae
- Subfamily: Orchidoideae
- Tribe: Orchideae
- Subtribe: Orchidinae
- Genus: Veyretella; Szlach. & Olszewski

Genus of orchids

Veyretella is a genus of terrestrial flowering plants in the orchid family, Orchidaceae. It contains two known species, both endemic to Gabon.

- Veyretella flabellata Szlach., Marg. & Mytnik
- Veyretella hetaerioides (Summerh.) Szlach. & Olszewski

== See also ==
- List of Orchidaceae genera
