= Dunstervillea =

Scientific classification
- Kingdom: Plantae
- Clade: Tracheophytes
- Clade: Angiosperms
- Clade: Monocots
- Order: Asparagales
- Family: Orchidaceae
- Subfamily: Epidendroideae
- Tribe: Cymbidieae
- Subtribe: Oncidiinae
- Genus: Dunstervillea; Garay
- Species: D. mirabilis

Binomial name
- Dunstervillea mirabilis Garay

Genus of orchids

Dunstervillea is a genus of flowering plants from the orchid family, Orchidaceae. At present (June 2014), only one species is known, Dunstervillea mirabilis, native to Venezuela (Bolívar Province) to Brazil (State of Roraima), and eastern Ecuador. It is named after the orchidologist G. C. K. Dunsterville.

The Orchidaceae family encompasses about 6–11% of all species of seed plants

== See also ==
- List of Orchidaceae genera
