= Bhutanthera =

Scientific classification
- Kingdom: Plantae
- Clade: Tracheophytes
- Clade: Angiosperms
- Clade: Monocots
- Order: Asparagales
- Family: Orchidaceae
- Subfamily: Orchidoideae
- Tribe: Orchideae
- Subtribe: Orchidinae
- Genus: Bhutanthera; Renz

Type species
- Habenaria albomarginata King & Pantling

Genus of orchids

Bhutanthera is a genus of terrestrial orchids native to the Himalaya Mountains of Asia.

- Bhutanthera albomarginata (King & Pantling) Renz - Nepal, Sikkim, Bhutan, Assam, Arunachal Pradesh
- Bhutanthera albosanguinea Renz - Bhutan
- Bhutanthera albovirens Renz - Bhutan
- Bhutanthera alpina (Hand.-Mazz.) Renz - Tibet, Nepal, Sikkim, Bhutan, Assam, Arunachal Pradesh
- Bhutanthera fimbriata Raskoti - Nepal
- Bhutanthera himalayana Renz - Bhutan

formerly included

- Bhutanthera humidicola (K.Y.Lang & D.S.Deng) Ormerod, synonym of Frigidorchis humidicola (K.Y.Lang & D.S.Deng) Z.J.Liu & S.C.Chen,
