= Greenwoodiella =

Scientific classification
- Kingdom: Plantae
- Clade: Tracheophytes
- Clade: Angiosperms
- Clade: Monocots
- Order: Asparagales
- Family: Orchidaceae
- Subfamily: Orchidoideae
- Tribe: Cranichideae
- Subtribe: Spiranthinae
- Genus: Greenwoodiella; Salazar, Hern.-López & J.Sharma (2016)

Species
- Greenwoodiella deserticola Salazar, Hern.-López & J.Sharma; Greenwoodiella micrantha (Lex.) Salazar & R.Jiménez; Greenwoodiella wercklei (Schltr.) Salazar & R.Jiménez

Genus of flowering plants

Greenwoodiella is a genus of orchids. It includes three species native to Central America, Mexico, Texas, Cuba, and Hispaniola.

- Greenwoodiella deserticola Salazar, Hern.-López & J.Sharma – northeastern Mexico (Tamaulipas) and Texas
- Greenwoodiella micrantha (Lex.) Salazar & R.Jiménez – central and southwestern Mexico
- Greenwoodiella wercklei (Schltr.) Salazar & R.Jiménez – Cuba, Hispaniola, Nicaragua, Costa Rica, and southwestern Mexico
