= Kylicanthe =

Scientific classification
- Kingdom: Plantae
- Clade: Tracheophytes
- Clade: Angiosperms
- Clade: Monocots
- Order: Asparagales
- Family: Orchidaceae
- Subfamily: Epidendroideae
- Tribe: Vandeae
- Subtribe: Angraecinae
- Genus: Kylicanthe

Genus of flowering plants

Kylicanthe is a genus of orchids. It includes six species native to tropical Africa, ranging from Guinea to Ethiopia and south to Angola and Tanzania.

== Species ==
Six species are accepted.

- Kylicanthe arcuata Descourv., Stévart & Droissart
- Kylicanthe bueae (Schltr.) Farminhão, Stévart & Droissart
- Kylicanthe cornuata Descourv., Stévart & Droissart
- Kylicanthe liae (Eb.Fisch., Killmann, J.-P.Lebel & Delep.) Descourv.
- Kylicanthe perezverae Descourv., Stévart & Farminhão
- Kylicanthe rohrii (Rchb.f.) Descourv. & Farminhão
