= Pendusalpinx =

Scientific classification
- Kingdom: Plantae
- Clade: Tracheophytes
- Clade: Angiosperms
- Clade: Monocots
- Order: Asparagales
- Family: Orchidaceae
- Subfamily: Epidendroideae
- Tribe: Epidendreae
- Subtribe: Pleurothallidinae
- Genus: Pendusalpinx; Karremans & Mel.Fernández

Genus of orchids

Pendusalpinx is a genus of orchids. It includes seven species native to western and northern South America, ranging from Venezuela to Bolivia and to French Guiana.

== Species ==
Seven species are accepted.

- Pendusalpinx berlineri (Luer) Karremans & Mel.Fernández
- Pendusalpinx dependens (Luer) Karremans & Mel.Fernández
- Pendusalpinx echinata (Luer & Hirtz) Karremans & Mel.Fernández
- Pendusalpinx glabra (D.E.Benn. & Christenson) Karremans & Mel.Fernández
- Pendusalpinx patula (Luer) Karremans & Mel.Fernández
- Pendusalpinx sijmii (Luer) Karremans & Mel.Fernández
- Pendusalpinx vasquezii (Luer) Karremans & Mel.Fernández
