= Thuniopsis =

Scientific classification
- Kingdom: Plantae
- Clade: Tracheophytes
- Clade: Angiosperms
- Clade: Monocots
- Order: Asparagales
- Family: Orchidaceae
- Subfamily: Epidendroideae
- Tribe: Arethuseae
- Subtribe: Coelogyninae
- Genus: Thuniopsis; L.Li, D.P.Ye & Shi J.Li
- Species: T. subsessilis

Binomial name
- Thuniopsis subsessilis (Rolfe) Ormerod, Kurzweil & Schuit.

Synonyms
- Arundina subsessilis Rolfe; Dilochia subsessilis (Rolfe) S.Thomas; Thunia cleistogama D.P.Ye & H.Jiang; Thuniopsis cleistogama L.Li, D.P.Ye & Shi J.Li

Genus of flowering plants

Thuniopsis is a genus of flowering plants belonging to the family Orchidaceae. It includes a single species, Thuniopsis subsessilis, a perennial or lithophyte native to south-central China (Yunnan) and Myanmar.
