= Pridgeonia =

Scientific classification
- Kingdom: Plantae
- Clade: Tracheophytes
- Clade: Angiosperms
- Clade: Monocots
- Order: Asparagales
- Family: Orchidaceae
- Subfamily: Epidendroideae
- Tribe: Cymbidieae
- Subtribe: Zygopetalinae
- Genus: Pridgeonia; Pupulin
- Species: P. insignis

Binomial name
- Pridgeonia insignis Pupulin

Genus of flowering plants

Pridgeonia is a genus of orchids. It includes a single species, Pridgeonia insignis, which is endemic to Ecuador. Franco Pupulin described both the genus and the species in 2019.
