= Amoana =

Scientific classification
- Kingdom: Plantae
- Clade: Tracheophytes
- Clade: Angiosperms
- Clade: Monocots
- Order: Asparagales
- Family: Orchidaceae
- Subfamily: Epidendroideae
- Tribe: Epidendreae
- Subtribe: Laeliinae
- Genus: Amoana; Leopardi & Carnevali

Genus of flowering plants

Amoana is a genus of flowering plants belonging to the family Orchidaceae.

Its native range is Southwestern Mexico.

Species:

- Amoana kienastii (Rchb.f.) Leopardi & Carnevali
- Amoana latipetala Leopardi & Hágsater
