= Kipandiorchis =

Scientific classification
- Kingdom: Plantae
- Clade: Tracheophytes
- Clade: Angiosperms
- Clade: Monocots
- Order: Asparagales
- Family: Orchidaceae
- Subfamily: Epidendroideae
- Tribe: Vandeae
- Subtribe: Aeridinae
- Genus: Kipandiorchis; P.O'Byrne & Gokusing

Species
- Kipandiorchis jamirusii P.O'Byrne & Gokusing; Kipandiorchis jiewhoei P.O'Byrne & Gokusing

Genus of orchids

Kipandiorchis is a genus of orchids. It includes two species which are endemic to Sabah state in northern Borneo.

- Kipandiorchis jamirusii P.O'Byrne & Gokusing
- Kipandiorchis jiewhoei P.O'Byrne & Gokusing
