= Opilionanthe =

Scientific classification
- Kingdom: Plantae
- Clade: Tracheophytes
- Clade: Angiosperms
- Clade: Monocots
- Order: Asparagales
- Family: Orchidaceae
- Subfamily: Epidendroideae
- Tribe: Epidendreae
- Subtribe: Pleurothallidinae
- Genus: Opilionanthe; Karremans & Bogarín

Species
- Opilionanthe magdalenae Damian & Mitidieri; Opilionanthe manningii (Luer) Karremans & Bogarín

Genus of orchids

Opilionanthe is a genus of orchids. It includes two species of epiphytes native to Peru.

- Opilionanthe magdalenae Damian & Mitidieri
- Opilionanthe manningii (Luer) Karremans & Bogarín
