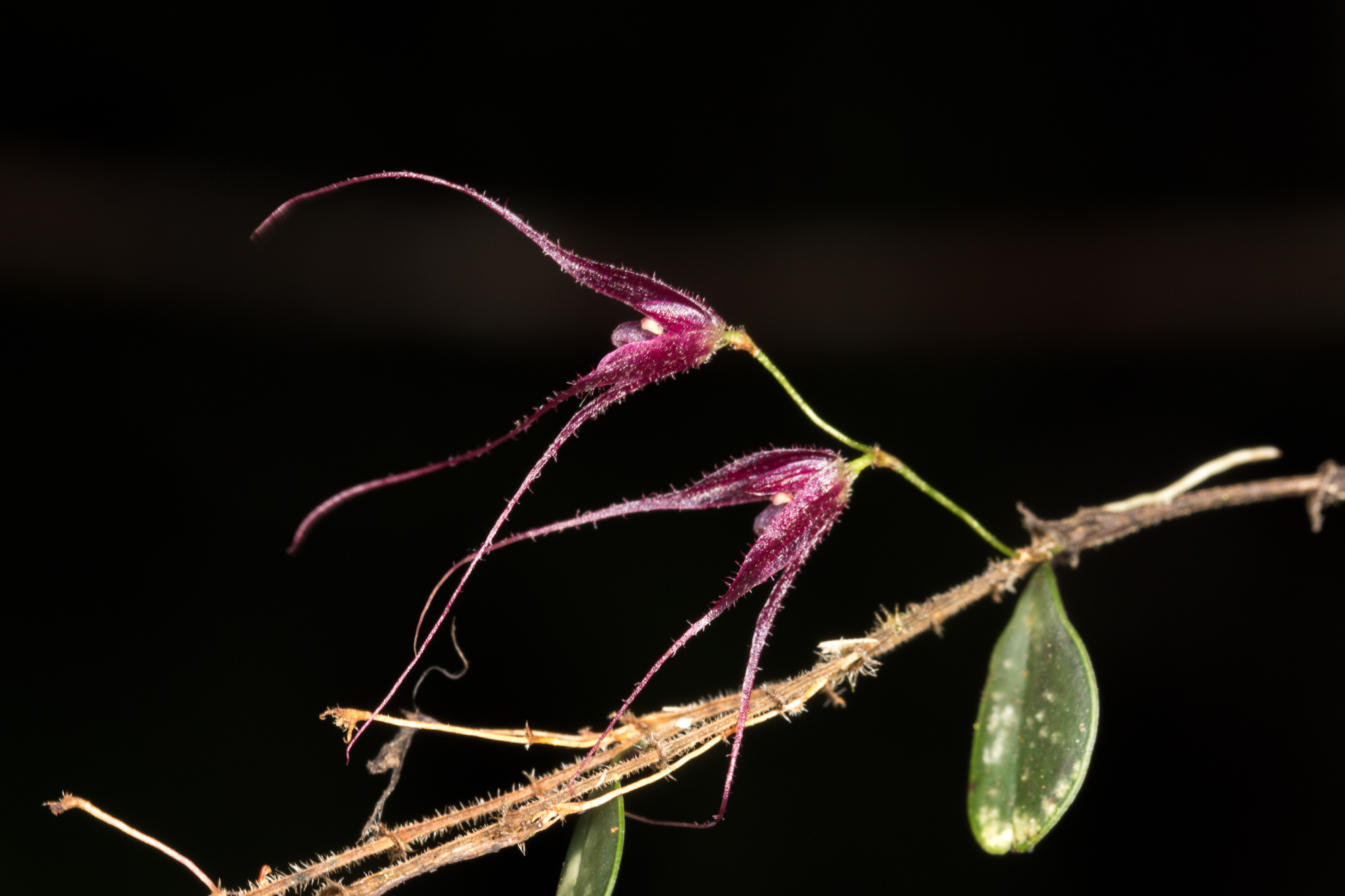

Scientific classification
- Kingdom: Plantae
- Clade: Tracheophytes
- Clade: Angiosperms
- Clade: Monocots
- Order: Asparagales
- Family: Orchidaceae
- Subfamily: Epidendroideae
- Tribe: Epidendreae
- Subtribe: Pleurothallidinae
- Genus: Gravendeelia; Bogarín & Karremans
- Species: G. chamaelepanthes

Binomial name
- Gravendeelia chamaelepanthes (Rchb.f.) Bogarín & Karremans

Synonyms
- Humboltia chamaelepanthes (Rchb.f.) Kuntze; Lepanthes corazonis Schltr.; Pleurothallis chamaelepanthes Rchb.f. (1855) (basionym); Pleurothallis microcharis Schltr.; Pleurothallis microcharis var. minor Schltr.; Trichosalpinx chamaelepanthes (Rchb.f.) Luer; Trichosalpinx microcharis (Schltr.) Luer; Tubella chamaelepanthes (Rchb.f.) Archila

= Gravendeelia =

Genus of orchids

Gravendeelia is a genus of orchids. It contains a single species, Gravendeelia chamaelepanthes, an epiphyte native to the Andes of Colombia, Ecuador, Peru, and Bolivia. In Colombia it is native to the departments of Antioquia, Caldas, Cauca, Cundinamarca, Nariño, Putumayo, Santander, and Valle del Cauca from 1850 to 3600 meters elevation.
