= Bidoupia =

Scientific classification
- Kingdom: Plantae
- Clade: Tracheophytes
- Clade: Angiosperms
- Clade: Monocots
- Order: Asparagales
- Family: Orchidaceae
- Subfamily: Orchidoideae
- Tribe: Cranichideae
- Subtribe: Goodyerinae
- Genus: Bidoupia; Aver., Ormerod & Duy

Genus of flowering plants

Bidoupia is a genus of flowering plants belonging to the family Orchidaceae.

Its native range is Vietnam.

Species:

- Bidoupia khangii Aver.
- Bidoupia micrantha Aver., V.C.Nguyen & Duy
- Bidoupia phongii Aver., Ormerod & Duy
