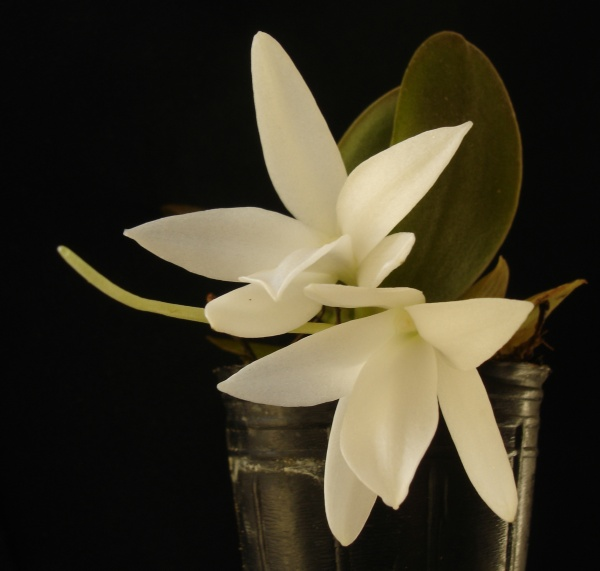
- Aerangis fastuosa

Scientific classification
- Kingdom: Plantae
- Clade: Tracheophytes
- Clade: Angiosperms
- Clade: Monocots
- Order: Asparagales
- Family: Orchidaceae
- Subfamily: Epidendroideae
- Tribe: Vandeae
- Subtribe: Aerangidinae; Summerh.

= Aerangidinae =

Subtribe of orchids

Aerangidinae is classified as a subtribe within the tribe Vandeae in the family Orchidaceae. However, it is likely to soon become a synonym of Angraecinae with the genera below re-allocated to this sub-tribe. As traditionally circumscribed, it consists of 36 genera and about 300 species. The type genus of this subtribe is Aerangis. Members of this group are epiphytic orchids having a monopodial habit and are endemic to tropical Africa and Madagascar. They are distinguished from the other subtribes in Vandeae by having an elongate rostellum, an elongate spur, and two pollinia. Most genera in the group indicate pollination by moths, however leaf beetles (family Chrysomelidae) are reported as frequent visitors, but it is unknown whether they are vectors for pollination.

== Genera ==
Genera in this subtribe are listed below:

- Aerangis
- Ancistrorhynchus
- Angraecopsis
- Azadehdelia
- Beclardia
- Bolusiella
- Cardiochilos
- Chamaeangis
- Chauliodon
- Cyrtorchis
- Diaphananthe
- Dinklageella
- Distylodon
- Eggelingia
- Encheiridion
- Erasanthe
- Eurychone
- Holmesia
- Listrostachys
- Margelliantha
- Microcoelia
- Microterangis
- Mystacidium
- Nephrangis
- Plectrelminthus
- Podangis
- Rangaeris
- Rhaesteria
- Rhipidoglossum
- Sarcorhynchus
- Solenangis
- Sphyrarhynchus
- Summerhayesia
- Taeniorrhiza
- Triceratorhynchus
- Tridactyle
- Ypsilopus
