= Cryptopus =

Cryptopus may refer to:

- Cryptopus (plant), a genus of plants in the family Orchidaceae
- Cryptopus, a genus of turtles in the family Trionychidae, synonym of Cyclanorbis
