= Lemurorchis =

Scientific classification
- Kingdom: Plantae
- Clade: Tracheophytes
- Clade: Angiosperms
- Clade: Monocots
- Order: Asparagales
- Family: Orchidaceae
- Subfamily: Epidendroideae
- Tribe: Vandeae
- Subtribe: Angraecinae
- Genus: Lemurorchis; Kraenzl.
- Species: L. madagascariensis

Binomial name
- Lemurorchis madagascariensis Kraenzl.

Genus of orchids

Lemurorchis is a genus of flowering plants from the orchid family, Orchidaceae. It contains only one known species, Lemurorchis madagascariensis, an epiphyte endemic to Madagascar.
