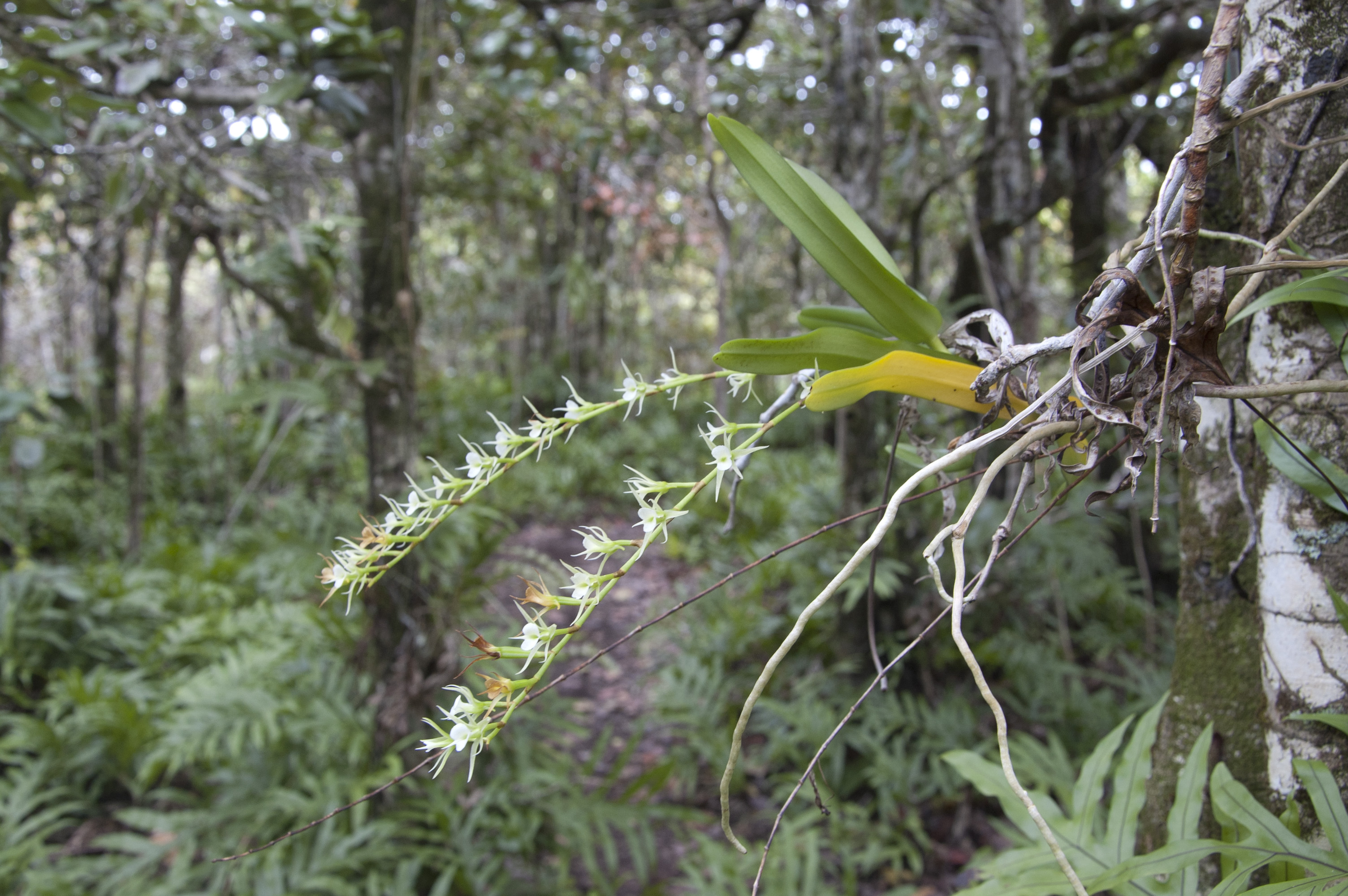
- Oeoniella polystachys

Scientific classification
- Kingdom: Plantae
- Clade: Tracheophytes
- Clade: Angiosperms
- Clade: Monocots
- Order: Asparagales
- Family: Orchidaceae
- Subfamily: Epidendroideae
- Tribe: Vandeae
- Subtribe: Angraecinae
- Genus: Oeoniella; Schltr.

= Oeoniella =

Genus of orchids

Oeoniella is a genus of flowering plants from the orchid family, Orchidaceae. It contains two known species, both native to various islands in the Indian Ocean.

- Oeoniella aphrodite (Balf.f. & S.Moore) Schltr. - Seychelles, Mauritius, Rodrigues
- Oeoniella polystachys (Thouars) Schltr. - Réunion, Mauritius, Comoros, Madagascar
