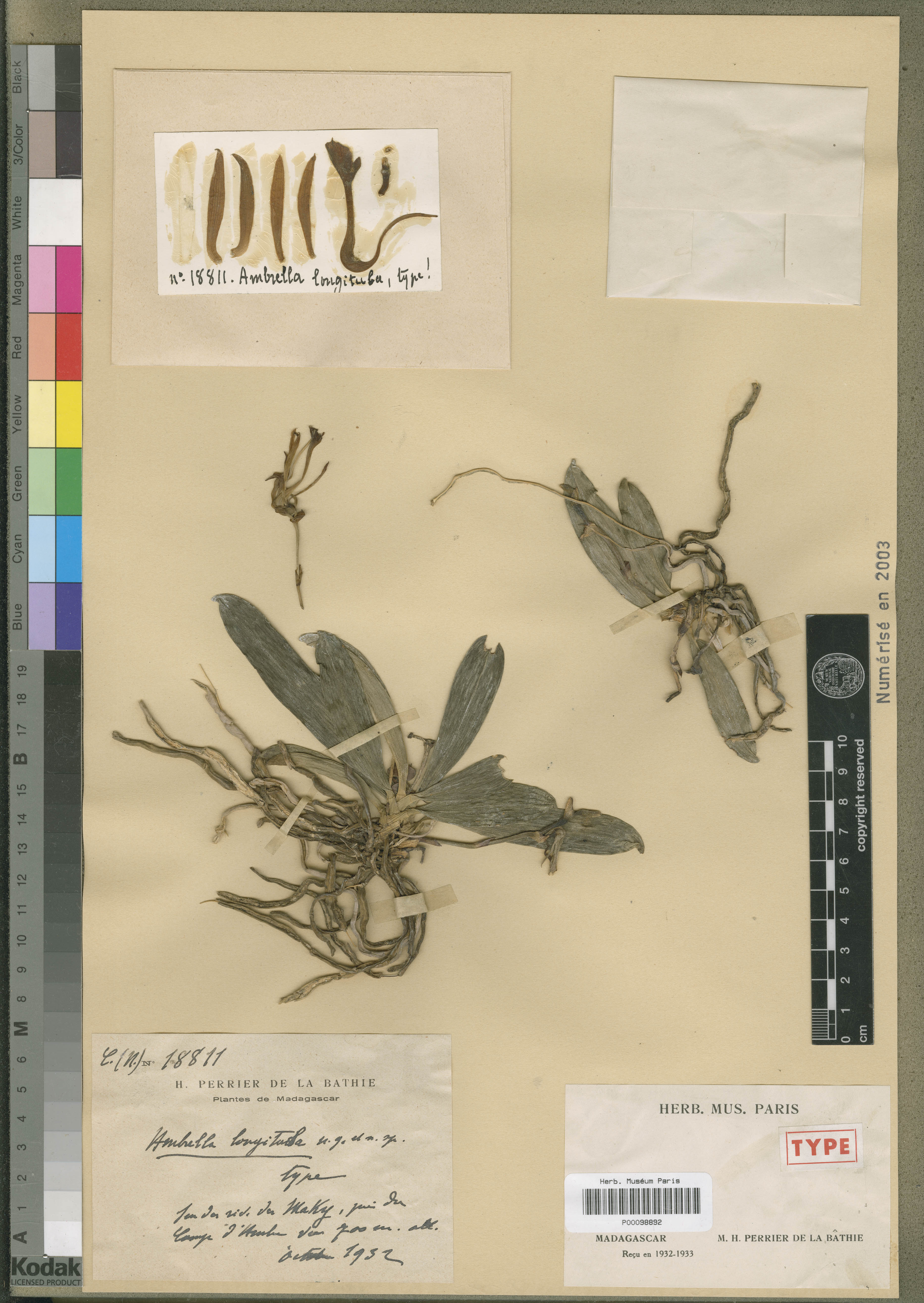
- type specimen of Ambrella longituba
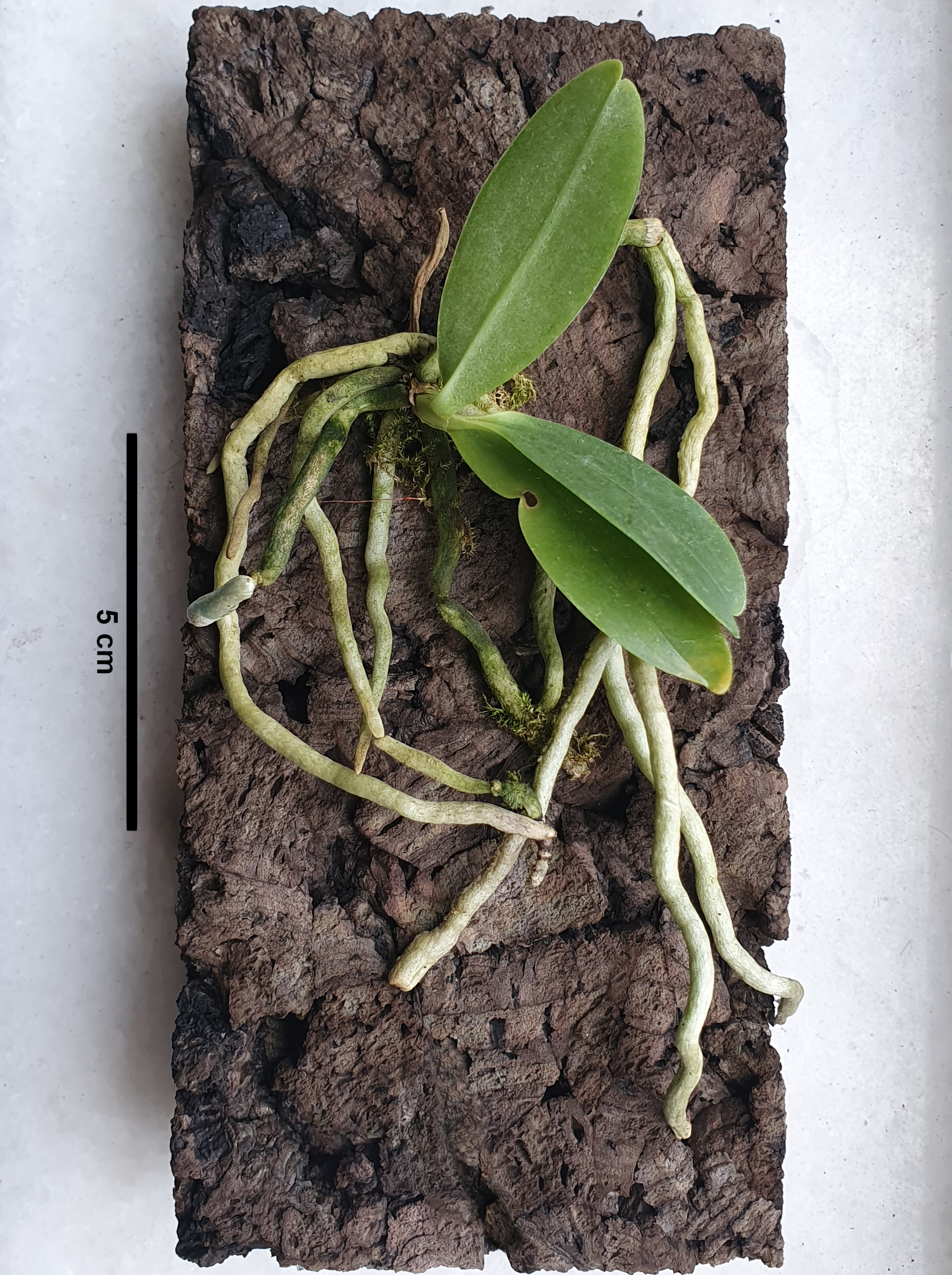
- Ambrella longituba in cultivation

Scientific classification
- Kingdom: Plantae
- Clade: Tracheophytes
- Clade: Angiosperms
- Clade: Monocots
- Order: Asparagales
- Family: Orchidaceae
- Subfamily: Epidendroideae
- Tribe: Vandeae
- Subtribe: Angraecinae
- Genus: Ambrella; H.Perrier
- Species: A. longituba

Binomial name
- Ambrella longituba H.Perrier

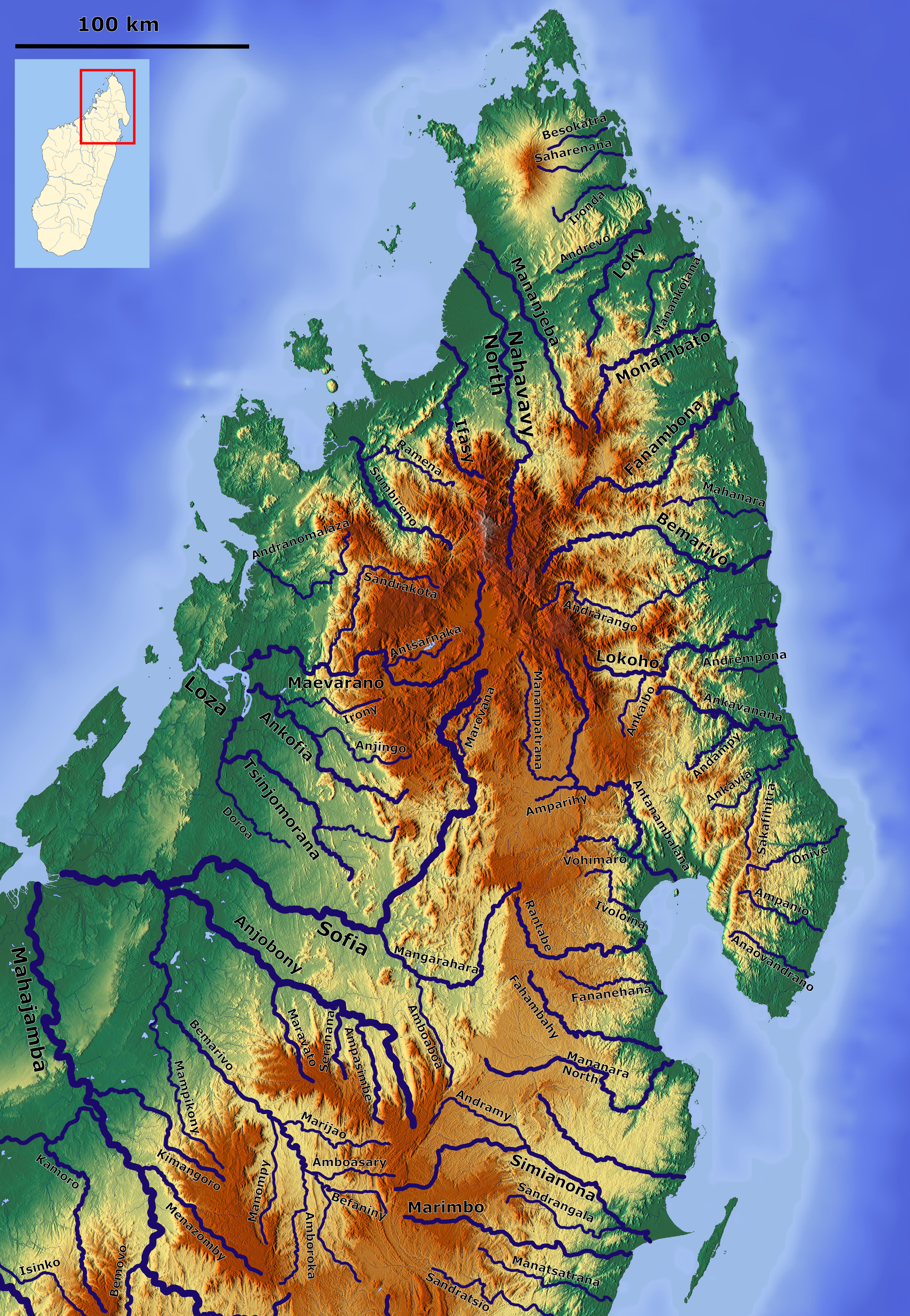
- Approximate distribution of Ambrella longituba in North Madagascar

= Ambrella longituba =

Species of orchid

Ambrella is a monotypic genus in the orchid family. The single species, Ambrella longituba is endemic to Madagascar. The type specimen was collected and described by Joseph Marie Henry Alfred Perrier de la Bâthie in 1934.

== Description ==
The plants are relatively small, epiphytic orchids. The flowers are big in relation to the size of the plants. The sepals are free and resemble the petals. The unusual, 45 mm long, spurred labellum is tubulate and encloses the column. The inner surface of the tube is covered with trichomes.

== Ecology ==
This species is native to the semi-dry forests of the Northern tip of Madagascar at altitudes of 800 m above sea level. It has been found growing on branches of Viguieranthus alternans (Benth.) Villiers (syn. Calliandra alternans Benth.), which is the preferred phorophyte of Ambrella longituba. Its pollinators are corrently unknown. However, H. Perrier De La Bathie speculates the narrow tube of the labellum only allows a few very special insects to fertilise the flowers, and he states this explains the rarity of the species. Flowering occurs in November.

== Conservation ==
This species is rare. There are five known records of occurrence dating from 1932 to 1995. One record was collected from within the Parc national de la Montagne d'Ambre and another was collected in close proximity of the Réserve spéciale de la Forêt d'Ambre. It is protected under the CITES appendix II.

== Etymology ==
The specific epithet longituba is composed of longi- meaning long and -tuba meaning trumpet. It refers to the long tube-shaped labellum of the flowers.

== Cultivation ==
It is uncommon in cultivation.
