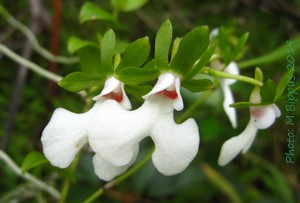
- Oeonia rosea

Scientific classification
- Kingdom: Plantae
- Clade: Embryophytes
- Clade: Tracheophytes
- Clade: Spermatophytes
- Clade: Angiosperms
- Clade: Monocots
- Order: Asparagales
- Family: Orchidaceae
- Subfamily: Epidendroideae
- Tribe: Vandeae
- Subtribe: Angraecinae
- Genus: Oeonia; Lindl.

Species
- Oeonia brauniana; Oeonia curvata; Oeonia madagascariensis; Oeonia rosea; Oeonia volucris

Synonyms
- Aeonia Lindl., spelling variant; Volucrepis Thouars; Perrieriella Schltr.; Epidorkis Thouars; Epidorchis Thouars, spelling variant

= Oeonia =

Genus of orchids

Oeonia is a genus of rare orchids (family (Orchidaceae) comprising 5 currently accepted species native to Madagascar and the Mascarenes.
