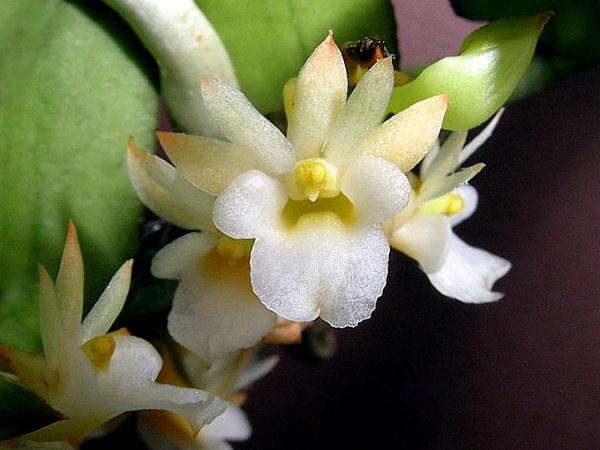
- Calyptrochilum christyanum

Scientific classification
- Kingdom: Plantae
- Clade: Tracheophytes
- Clade: Angiosperms
- Clade: Monocots
- Order: Asparagales
- Family: Orchidaceae
- Subfamily: Epidendroideae
- Tribe: Vandeae
- Subtribe: Angraecinae
- Genus: Calyptrochilum; Kraenzl.

Type species
- Calyptrochilum emarginatum (Afzel. ex Sw.) Schltr.

Synonyms
- Ossiculum P.J.Cribb & Laan

= Calyptrochilum =

Genus of orchids

Calyptrochilum is a genus of flowering plants from the orchid family Orchidaceae native to tropical Africa, with one species extending into Brazil.

Three species are recognized as of 2020:

- Calyptrochilum aurantiacum (P.J.Cribb & Laan) Stévart, M.Simo & Droissart - West Cameroon and Northwest Congo
- Calyptrochilum christyanum (Rchb.f.) Summerh. - Bahia region of Brazil; Africa from Senegal to Ethiopia to Zimbabwe and Mozambique
- Calyptrochilum emarginatum (Afzel. ex Sw.) Schltr. - Africa from Ivory Coast to Central African Republic south to Angola

== Taxonomy and naming ==
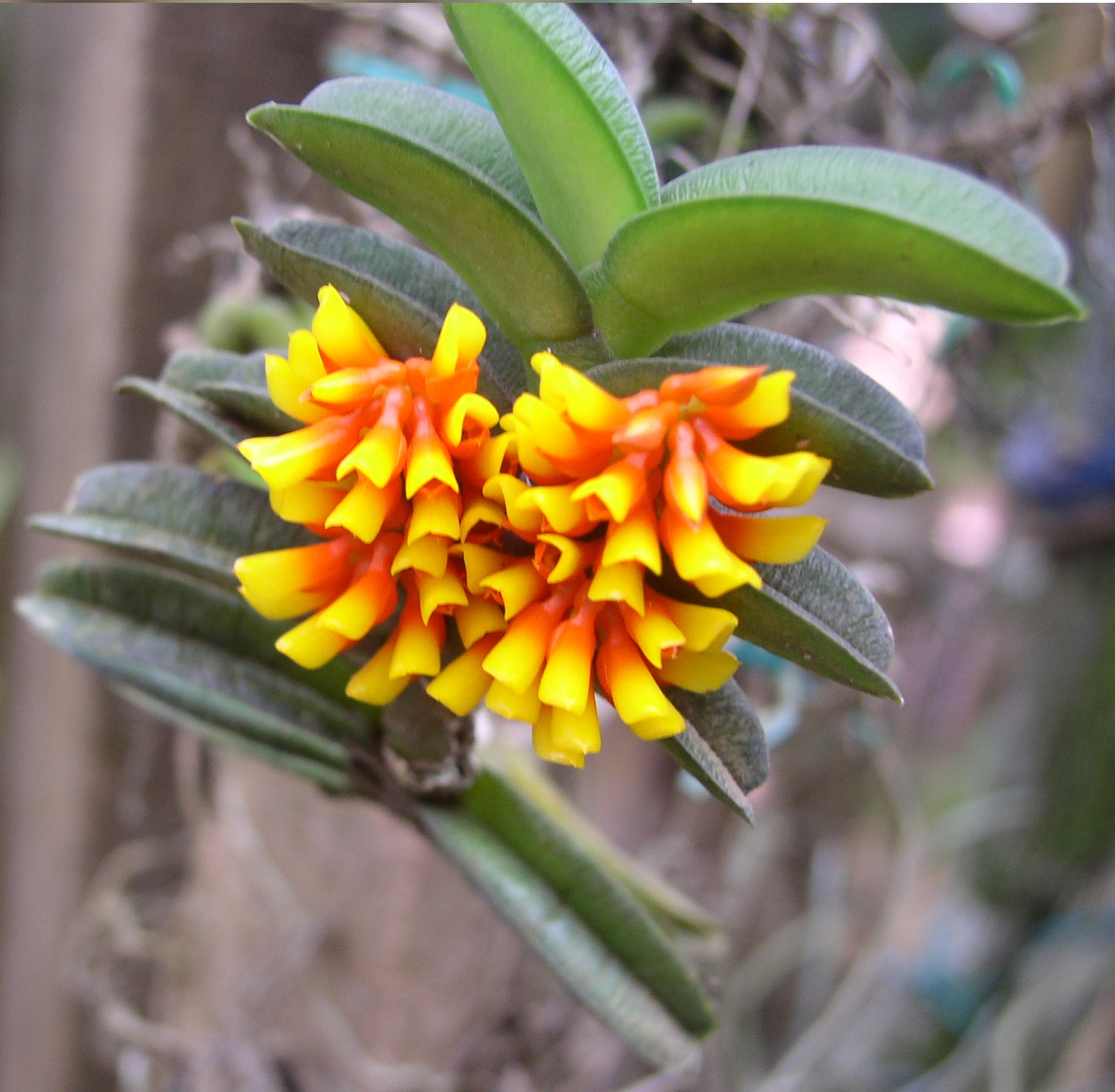
Calyptrochilum aurantiacum, a critically endangered species.

Calyptrochilum historically contained two species, C. christyanum and C. emarginatum. In 2018, the monotypic genus Ossiculum was moved into Calyptrochilum. The sole Ossiculum species was Ossiculum aurantiacum; it is endemic to Cameroon and is classified as Critically Endangered due to habitat loss.

The original describers of Ossiculum, P.J.Cribb & Laan, noted that the genus closely resembled Calyptrochilum in terms of floral morphology. In 1986, Gasson and Cribb (1986) found the leaf structure of Ossiculum and Calyptrochilum to possess shared characteristics that did not belong to other genera in the Angraecinae. These findings were confirmed in 2006 by Carlsward et al., but O. aurantiacum remained separate from Calyptrochilum because of several of its own distinctive features, among them its bright golden flowers. Finally, in 2018, Stévart, M.Simo & Droissart combined the previous morphological and cytological data with genomic information, cementing the position of the former monotypic genus within Calyptrochilum.

== Sources ==
- Pridgeon, A.M., Cribb, P.J., Chase, M.A. & Rasmussen, F. eds. (1999). Genera Orchidacearum 1. Oxford Univ. Press.
- Pridgeon, A.M., Cribb, P.J., Chase, M.A. & Rasmussen, F. eds. (2001). Genera Orchidacearum 2. Oxford Univ. Press.
- Pridgeon, A.M., Cribb, P.J., Chase, M.A. & Rasmussen, F. eds. (2003). Genera Orchidacearum 3. Oxford Univ. Press
- Berg Pana, H. 2005. Handbuch der Orchideen-Namen. Dictionary of Orchid Names. Dizionario dei nomi delle orchidee. Ulmer, Stuttgart
