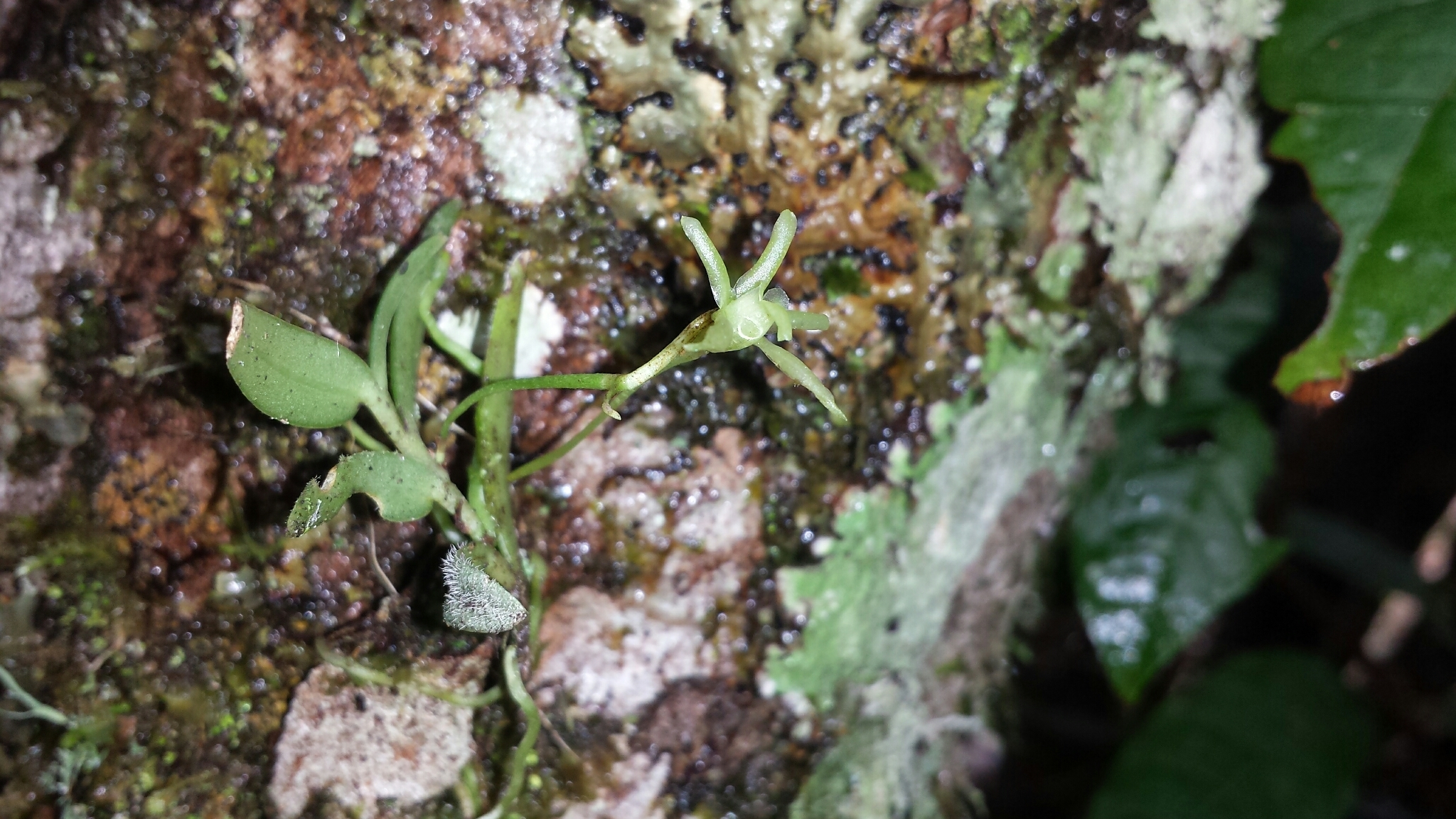
- Lemurella pallidiflora

Scientific classification
- Kingdom: Plantae
- Clade: Tracheophytes
- Clade: Angiosperms
- Clade: Monocots
- Order: Asparagales
- Family: Orchidaceae
- Subfamily: Epidendroideae
- Tribe: Vandeae
- Subtribe: Angraecinae
- Genus: Lemurella; Schltr.

= Lemurella =

Genus of orchids

Lemurella is a genus of flowering plants from the orchid family, Orchidaceae. It contains 4 currently recognized species (as of June 2014), native to Madagascar and to the Comoro Islands.

1. Lemurella culicifera (Rchb.f.) H.Perrier
2. Lemurella pallidiflora Bosser
3. Lemurella papillosa Bosser
4. Lemurella virescens H.Perrier
