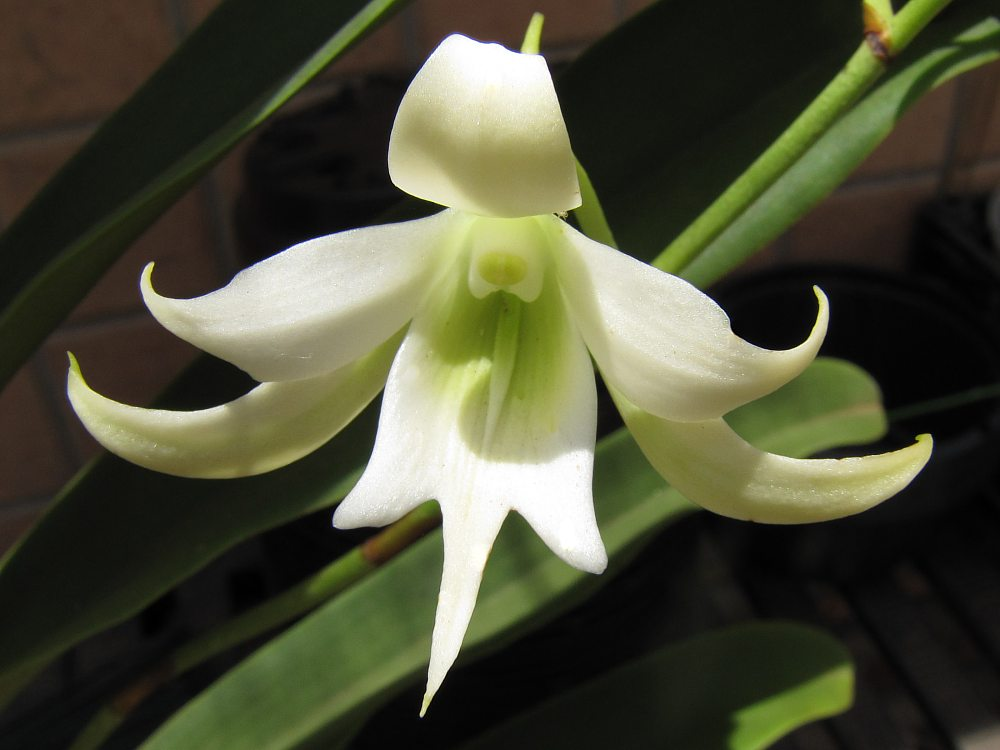
- Sobennikoffia humbertiana

Scientific classification
- Kingdom: Plantae
- Clade: Tracheophytes
- Clade: Angiosperms
- Clade: Monocots
- Order: Asparagales
- Family: Orchidaceae
- Subfamily: Epidendroideae
- Tribe: Vandeae
- Subtribe: Angraecinae
- Genus: Sobennikoffia; Schltr.

Species
- Sobennikoffia fournieriana (Kraenzl.) Schltr.; Sobennikoffia humbertiana H.Perrier; Sobennikoffia poissoniana H.Perrier; Sobennikoffia robusta (Schltr.) Schltr.

= Sobennikoffia =

Genus of orchids

Sobennikoffia is a genus of flowering plants from the orchid family, Orchidaceae. It contains four known species, all endemic to Madagascar.
