= Dinklageella =

Scientific classification
- Kingdom: Plantae
- Clade: Tracheophytes
- Clade: Angiosperms
- Clade: Monocots
- Order: Asparagales
- Family: Orchidaceae
- Subfamily: Epidendroideae
- Tribe: Vandeae
- Subtribe: Angraecinae
- Genus: Dinklageella; Mansf.

Synonyms
- Lacroixia Szlach.

Genus of orchids

Dinklageella is a genus of flowering plants from the orchid family, Orchidaceae. It contains 4 known species, all native to tropical West Africa.

- Dinklageella liberica Mansf.
- Dinklageella minor Summerh.
- Dinklageella scandens Stévart & P.J.Cribb
- Dinklageella villiersii Szlach. & Olszewski

== See also ==
- List of Orchidaceae genera
