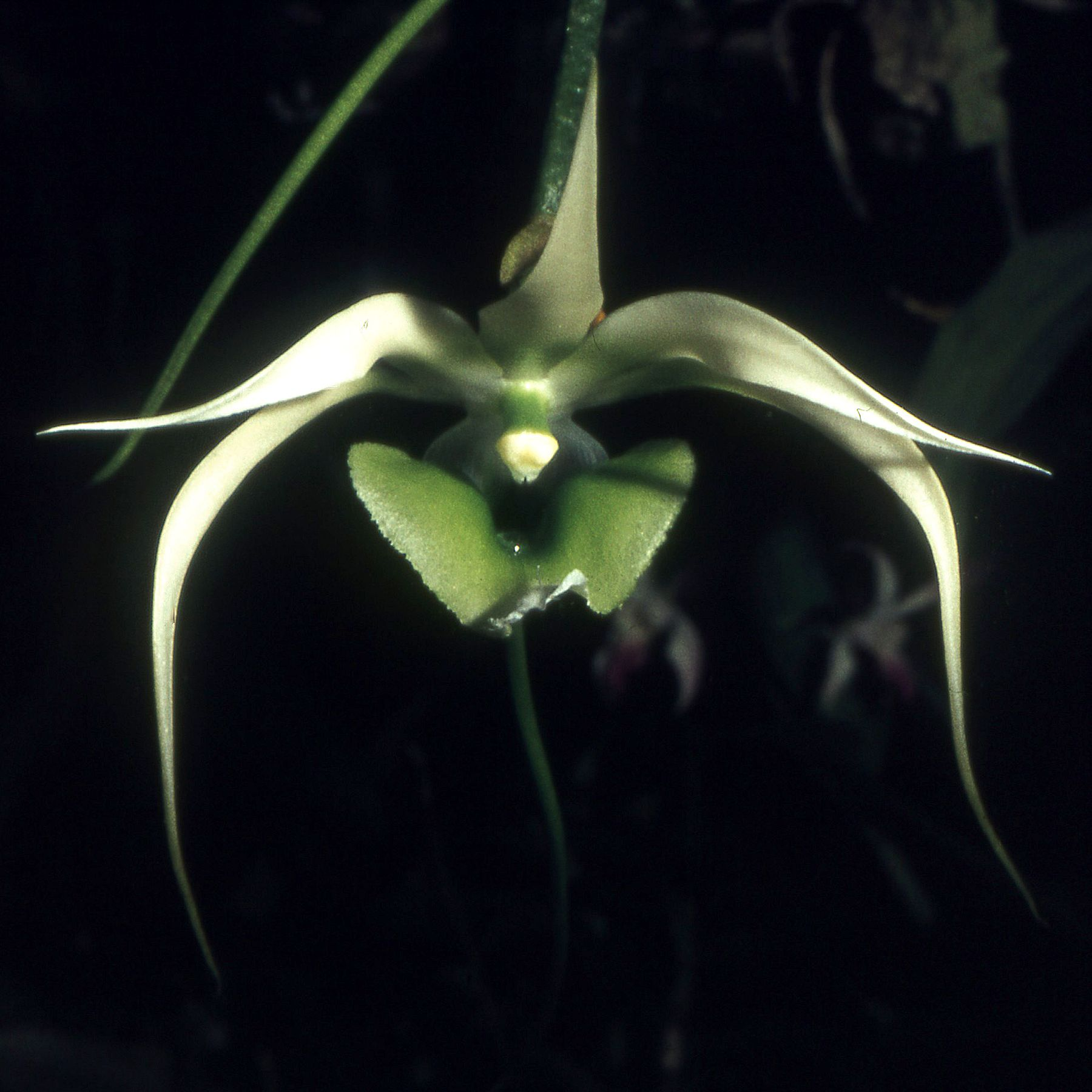

Scientific classification
- Kingdom: Plantae
- Clade: Tracheophytes
- Clade: Angiosperms
- Clade: Monocots
- Order: Asparagales
- Family: Orchidaceae
- Subfamily: Epidendroideae
- Tribe: Vandeae
- Subtribe: Angraecinae
- Genus: Erasanthe; P.J.Cribb, Hermans & D.L.Roberts
- Species: E. henrici

Binomial name
- Erasanthe henrici (Schltr.) P.J.Cribb, Hermans & D.L.Roberts

Synonyms
- Aeranthes henrici Schltr.

= Erasanthe =

Genus of plants

Erasanthe is a genus of epiphytic orchids. It contains only one known species, Erasanthe henrici, endemic to Madagascar. Two subspecies are recognized:

- Erasanthe henrici subsp. henrici
- Erasanthe henrici subsp. isaloensis P.J.Cribb, Hermans & D.L.Roberts (synonym Aeranthes henrici var. isaloensis H.Perrier ex Hermans
