= Sphyrarhynchus =

Scientific classification
- Kingdom: Plantae
- Clade: Tracheophytes
- Clade: Angiosperms
- Clade: Monocots
- Order: Asparagales
- Family: Orchidaceae
- Subfamily: Epidendroideae
- Tribe: Vandeae
- Subtribe: Angraecinae
- Genus: Sphyrarhynchus; Mansf.
- Species: S. schliebenii

Binomial name
- Sphyrarhynchus schliebenii Mansf.

Synonyms
- Angraecopsis schliebenii (Mansf.) R.Rice

Genus of orchids

Sphyrarhynchus is a monotypic genus of flowering plants from the orchid family, Orchidaceae. The sole species is Sphyrarhynchus schliebenii, endemic to Tanzania.

== See also ==
- List of Orchidaceae genera
