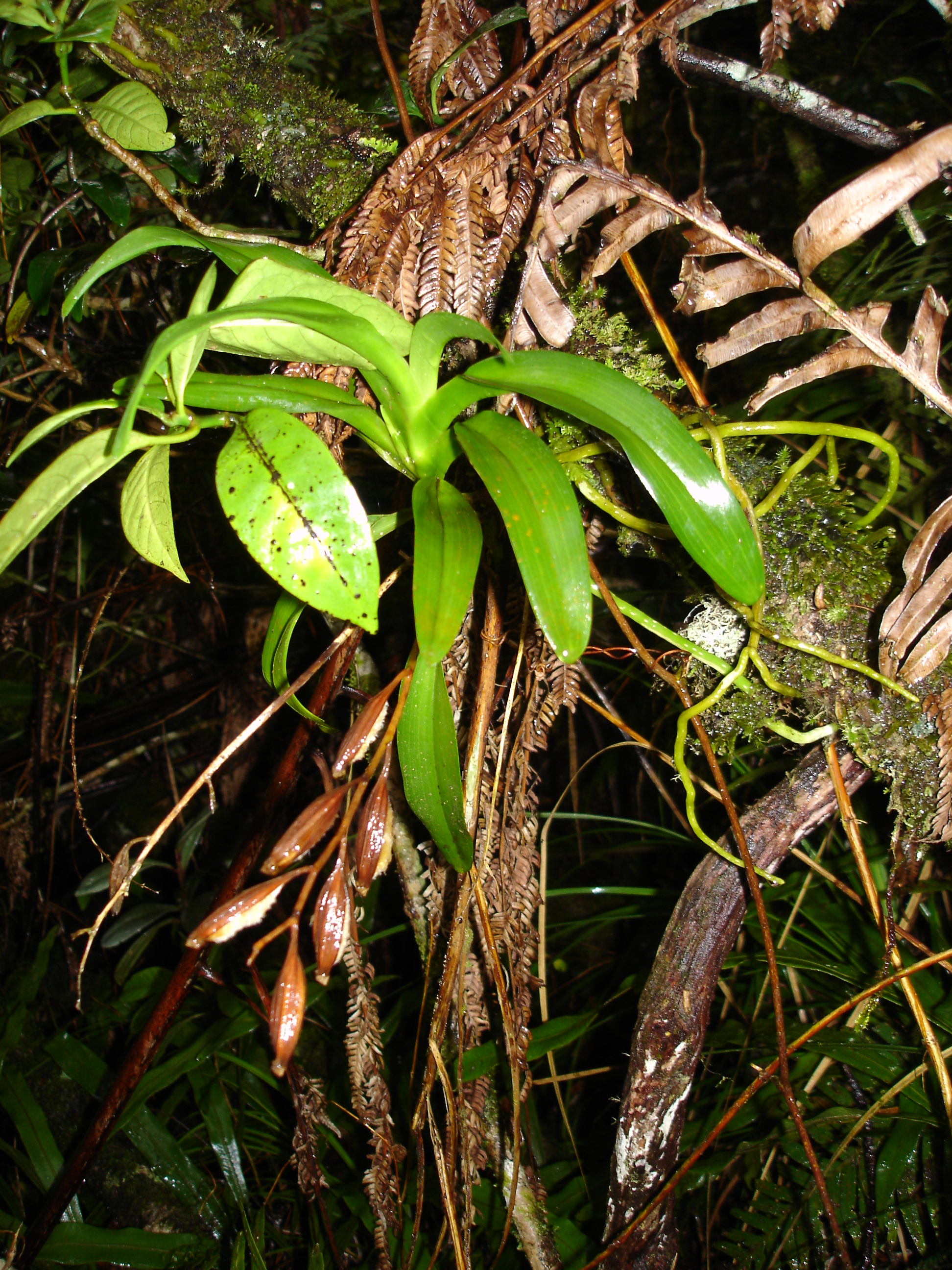
- Beclardia macrostachya

Scientific classification
- Kingdom: Plantae
- Clade: Tracheophytes
- Clade: Angiosperms
- Clade: Monocots
- Order: Asparagales
- Family: Orchidaceae
- Subfamily: Epidendroideae
- Tribe: Vandeae
- Subtribe: Angraecinae
- Genus: Beclardia; A.Rich.

Type species
- Beclardia macrostachya (Thouars) A.Rich.

Synonyms
- Brachystepis Thouars, nom. inval.

= Beclardia =

Genus of orchids

Beclardia is a genus of flowering plants from the orchid family, Orchidaceae. There are two recognized species, both native to islands in the Indian Ocean:

- Beclardia grandiflora Bosser - Madagascar
- Beclardia macrostachya (Thouars) A.Rich. - Madagascar, Mauritius, Réunion

== See also ==
- List of Orchidaceae genera
