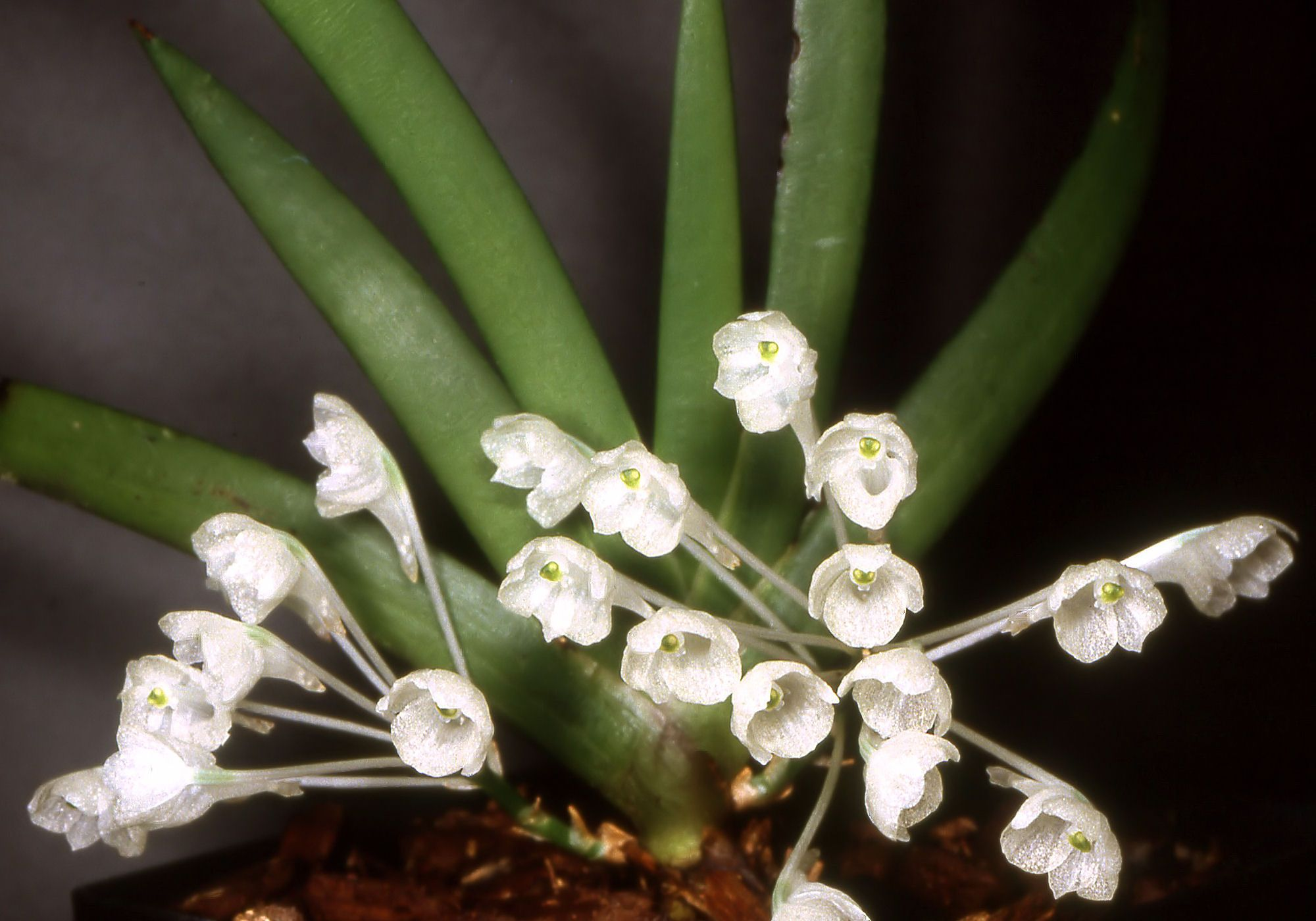
- Podangis dactyloceras

Scientific classification
- Kingdom: Plantae
- Clade: Embryophytes
- Clade: Tracheophytes
- Clade: Spermatophytes
- Clade: Angiosperms
- Clade: Monocots
- Order: Asparagales
- Family: Orchidaceae
- Subfamily: Epidendroideae
- Tribe: Vandeae
- Subtribe: Angraecinae
- Genus: Podangis; Schltr.

Synonyms
- Neowolffia O.Gruss

= Podangis =

Genus of orchids

Podangis is a genus of flowering plants from the orchid family, Orchidaceae.

There are two known species, native to tropical western and central Africa ranging from Senegal to Tanzania to Angola.

- Podangis dactyloceras (Rchb.f.) Schltr. (1918) - from Sierra Leone to Tanzania to Angola
- Podangis rhipsalisocia (Rchb.f.) P.J.Cribb & Carlsward, (2012) - from Senegal to Central African Republic to Angola
