= Cardiochilos =

Scientific classification
- Kingdom: Plantae
- Clade: Tracheophytes
- Clade: Angiosperms
- Clade: Monocots
- Order: Asparagales
- Family: Orchidaceae
- Subfamily: Epidendroideae
- Tribe: Vandeae
- Subtribe: Angraecinae
- Genus: Cardiochilos; P.J.Cribb
- Species: C. williamsonii

Binomial name
- Cardiochilos williamsonii P.J.Cribb
- Native distribution of Cardiochilos williamsonii

Genus of orchids

Cardiochilos is a monotypic genus of flowering plants from the orchid family, Orchidaceae. The only species is Cardiochilos williamsonii.

== Description ==
This species is a monopodial, epiphytic herb with up to 10 cm tall stems and up to 20 cm long, fleshy roots. The solitary, non-resuspinate flowers have hairy peduncles. Their heart-shaped labellum is the eponymous feature of this genus. The genus name Cardiochilos is composed of cardio from the greek kardio or kardia meaning heart, and chilos from the greek cheilos meaning lip.

== Ecology ==
It has been found in mist forests at elevations of 2590 m above sea level.

== See also ==
- List of Orchidaceae genera
