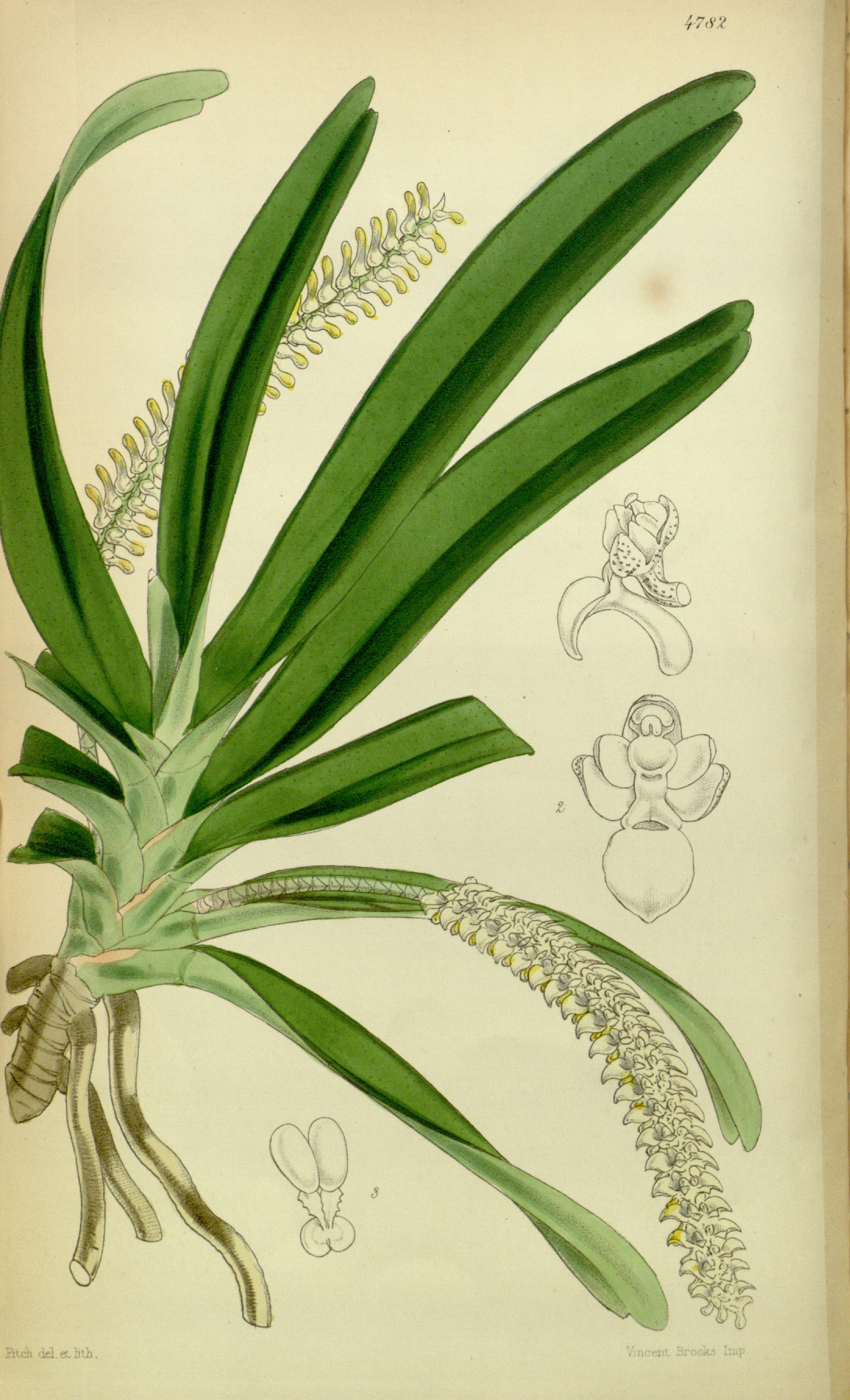
- An 1854 illustration

Scientific classification
- Kingdom: Plantae
- Clade: Tracheophytes
- Clade: Angiosperms
- Clade: Monocots
- Order: Asparagales
- Family: Orchidaceae
- Subfamily: Epidendroideae
- Tribe: Vandeae
- Subtribe: Angraecinae
- Genus: Listrostachys; Rchb.f.
- Species: L. pertusa

Binomial name
- Listrostachys pertusa (Lindl.) Rchb.f.

Synonyms
- Angraecum pertusum Lindl.; Angorchis pertusa (Lindl.) Kuntze; Listrostachys jenischiana Rchb.f.; Listrostachys behnickiana Kraenzl.

= Listrostachys =

Genus of orchids

Listrostachys is a genus of flowering plants from the orchid family, Orchidaceae. Many species have been placed in the genus over the years, most of them now transferred to other groups. At present (June 2014), only one species remains in the genus: Listrostachys pertusa. It is native to tropical Africa from Sierra Leone to Congo-Kinshasa.

== See also ==
- List of Orchidaceae genera
