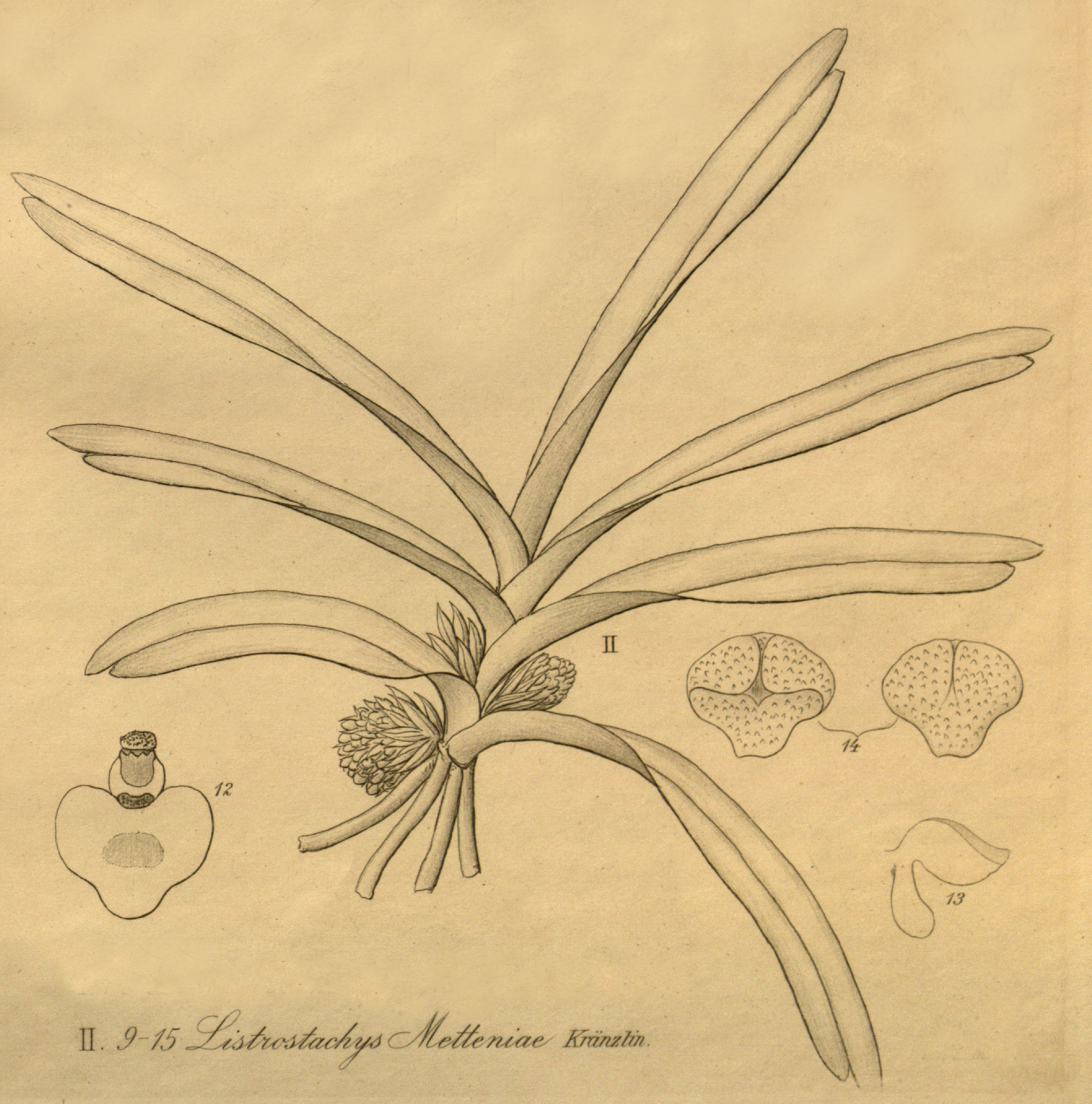
- Ancistrorhynchus metteniae

Scientific classification
- Kingdom: Plantae
- Clade: Tracheophytes
- Clade: Angiosperms
- Clade: Monocots
- Order: Asparagales
- Family: Orchidaceae
- Subfamily: Epidendroideae
- Tribe: Vandeae
- Subtribe: Angraecinae
- Genus: Ancistrorhynchus; Finet

Type species
- Ancistrorhynchus brevifolius Finet

Species
- See text

Synonyms
- Cephalangraecum Schltr.; Phormangis Schltr.

= Ancistrorhynchus =

Genus of orchids

Ancistrorhynchus is a genus of flowering plants in the orchid family Orchidaceae. It contains 17 species native to tropical Africa.

== Species ==
The following 17 species are accepted by Plants of the World Online as of November 2026:

- Ancistrorhynchus akeassiae Pérez-Vera – Ivory Coast, Nigeria, Liberia
- Ancistrorhynchus brevifolius Finet – Congo-Brazzaville
- Ancistrorhynchus capitatus (Lindl.) Summerh. – Ivory Coast, Liberia, Nigeria, Sierra Leone, Togo, Central African Republic, Equatorial Guinea, Gabon, Cameroon, Gulf of Guinea Islands, Uganda, Zaire (Democratic Republic of the Congo, Congo-Kinshasa)
- Ancistrorhynchus cephalotes (Rchb.f.) Summerh. – Ghana, Guinea, Ivory Coast, Liberia, Nigeria, Sierra Leone, Togo
- Ancistrorhynchus clandestinus (Lindl.) Schltr. – Ivory Coast, Ghana, Rwanda, Liberia, Nigeria, Sierra Leone, Togo, Central African Republic, Gabon, Cameroon, Uganda, Zaire (Democratic Republic of the Congo, Congo-Kinshasa)
- Ancistrorhynchus crystalensis P.J.Cribb & Laan – Equatorial Guinea, Gabon, Cameroon, Gulf of Guinea Islands
- Ancistrorhynchus laxiflorus Mansf. – Tanzania
- Ancistrorhynchus metteniae (Kraenzl.) Summerh. – Ivory Coast, Nigeria, Sierra Leone, Central African Republic, Gabon, Cameroon, Uganda, Zaire (Democratic Republic of the Congo, Congo-Kinshasa), Tanzania, Ethiopia, Gulf of Guinea Islands,
- Ancistrorhynchus ovatus Summerh. – Central African Republic, Gabon, Cameroon, Uganda, Congo-Brazzaville, Zaire (Democratic Republic of the Congo, Congo-Kinshasa)
- Ancistrorhynchus parviflorus Summerh. – Tanzania
- Ancistrorhynchus paysanii Senghas – Kenya
- Ancistrorhynchus recurvus Finet – Ghana, Guinea, Ivory Coast, Liberia, Nigeria, Togo, Cameroon, Uganda, Congo-Brazzaville, Zaire (Democratic Republic of the Congo, Congo-Kinshasa), Gulf of Guinea Islands
- Ancistrorhynchus refractus (Kraenzl.) Summerh. – Tanzania
- Ancistrorhynchus schumannii (Kraenzl.) Summerh. – Nigeria, Cameroon, Gabon, Zaire (Democratic Republic of the Congo, Congo-Kinshasa)
- Ancistrorhynchus serratus Summerh – Bioko, Nigeria, Cameroon, Congo-Brazzaville
- Ancistrorhynchus straussii (Schltr.) Schltr. – Nigeria, Cameroon, Gabon, Zaire (Democratic Republic of the Congo, Congo-Kinshasa)
- Ancistrorhynchus tenuicaulis Summerh. – Cameroon, Gabon, Zaire (Democratic Republic of the Congo, Congo-Kinshasa), Equatorial Guinea, Uganda, Tanzania, Rwanda, Malawi

== See also ==
- List of Orchidaceae genera
