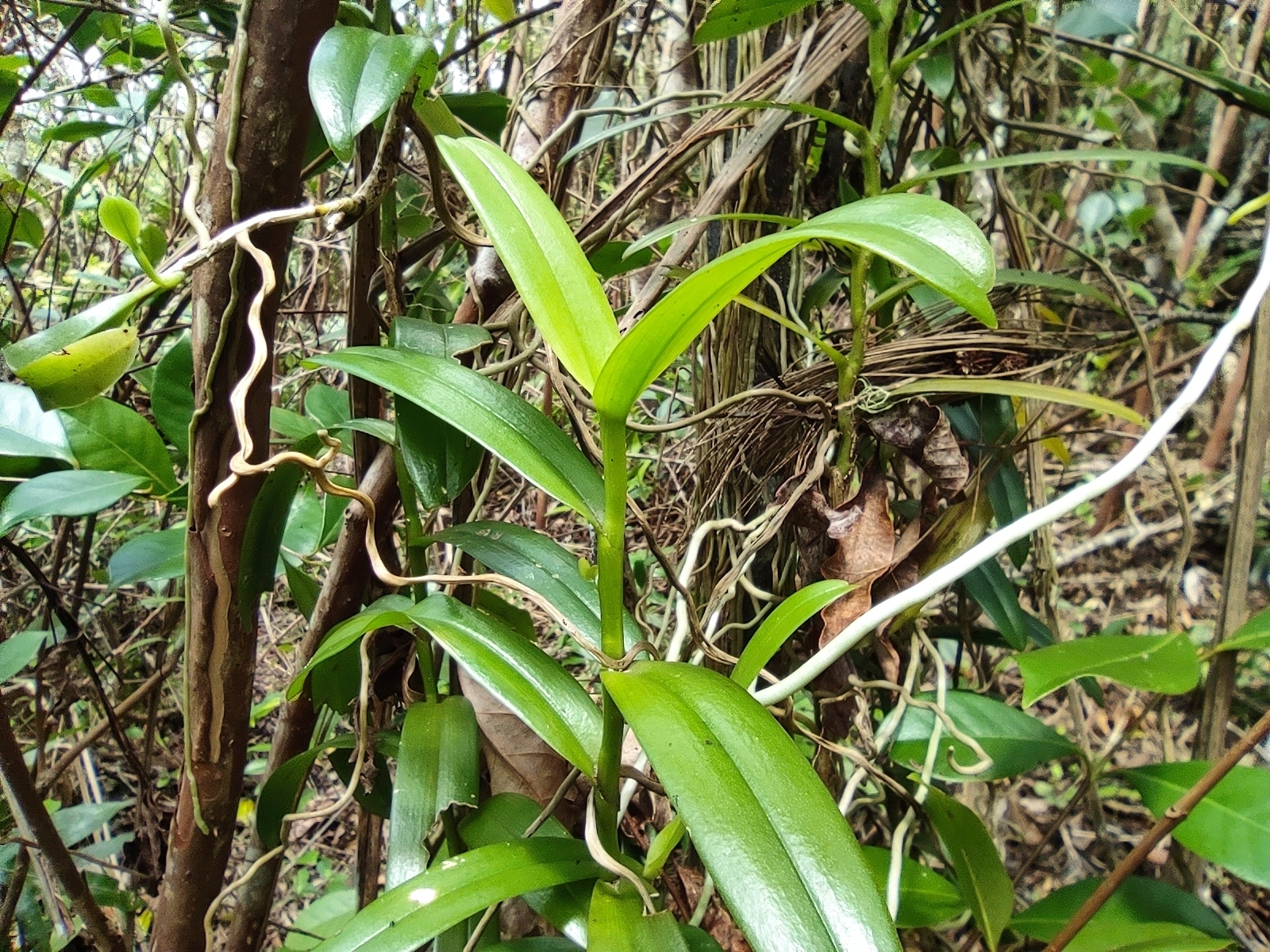
- Cryptopus elatus

Scientific classification
- Kingdom: Plantae
- Clade: Tracheophytes
- Clade: Angiosperms
- Clade: Monocots
- Order: Asparagales
- Family: Orchidaceae
- Subfamily: Epidendroideae
- Tribe: Vandeae
- Subtribe: Angraecinae
- Genus: Cryptopus; Lindl.

= Cryptopus (plant) =

Genus of orchids

Cryptopus, abbreviated Crypt. in the horticultural trade, is an orchid genus with 4 species native to Madagascar, Mauritius and La Réunion.

- Cryptopus brachiatus H.Perrier - Madagascar
- Cryptopus dissectus (Bosser) Bosser - Madagascar, Mauritius, Réunion
- Cryptopus elatus (Thouars) Lindl. - Mauritius, Réunion
- Cryptopus paniculatus H.Perrier - Madagascar
