= Ypsilopus =

Scientific classification
- Kingdom: Plantae
- Clade: Tracheophytes
- Clade: Angiosperms
- Clade: Monocots
- Order: Asparagales
- Family: Orchidaceae
- Subfamily: Epidendroideae
- Tribe: Vandeae
- Subtribe: Angraecinae
- Genus: Ypsilopus; Summerh.

Genus of orchids

Ypsilopus is a genus of flowering plants from the orchid family, Orchidaceae native to Africa.

== Species ==
- Ypsilopus erectus (P.J.Cribb) P.J.Cribb & J.Stewart - Tanzania, Mozambique, Malawi, Zambia, Zimbabwe, South Africa
- Ypsilopus leedalii P.J.Cribb - Tanzania
- Ypsilopus liae Delep. & J.-P.Lebel - Rwanda
- Ypsilopus longifolius (Kraenzl.) Summerh. - Tanzania, Kenya
- Ypsilopus viridiflorus P.J.Cribb & J.Stewart - Tanzania
- Ypsilopus zimbabweensis J.Farminhão & P.J.Cribb - Zimbabwe

== See also ==
- List of Orchidaceae genera
