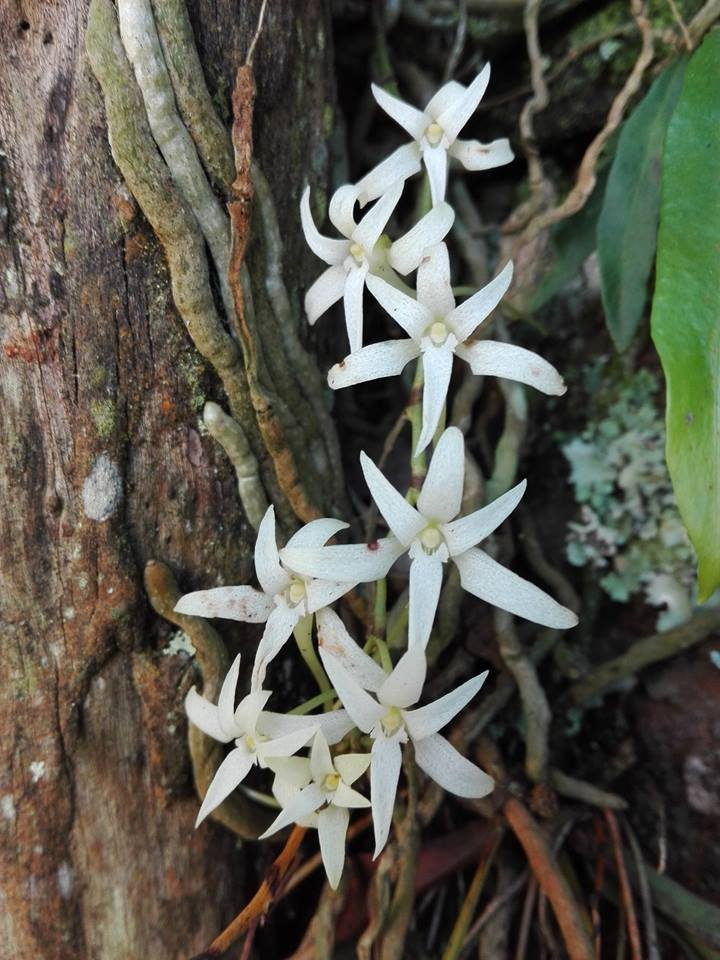
- Mystacidium capense

Scientific classification
- Kingdom: Plantae
- Clade: Embryophytes
- Clade: Tracheophytes
- Clade: Spermatophytes
- Clade: Angiosperms
- Clade: Monocots
- Order: Asparagales
- Family: Orchidaceae
- Subfamily: Epidendroideae
- Tribe: Vandeae
- Subtribe: Angraecinae
- Genus: Mystacidium; Lindl.

Type species
- Mystacidium capense

= Mystacidium =

Genus of orchids

Mystacidium, abbreviated as Mycdm in horticultural trade, is a genus of the orchid family (Orchidaceae). It is native to eastern and southern Africa from Tanzania to South Africa.

Species accepted as of June 2014:

Image	Name	Distribution	Elevation (m)
	Mystacidium aliciae Bolus	South Africa (Cape Province)	
	Mystacidium braybonae Summerh.	South Africa	800–1,500 metres (2,600–4,900 ft)
	Mystacidium capense (L.f.) Schltr.	South Africa, Swaziland	0–700 metres (0–2,297 ft)
	Mystacidium flanaganii (Bolus) Bolus	South Africa (Cape Province, Natal, Transvaal States )	
	Mystacidium gracile Harv.	South Africa, Zimbabwe, Madagascar	1,800 metres (5,900 ft)
	Mystacidium nguruense P.J.Cribb	Tanzania	
	Mystacidium pulchellum (Kraenzl.) Schltr.	Tanzania	
	Mystacidium pusillum Harv.	South Africa	900–1,200 metres (3,000–3,900 ft)
	Mystacidium tanganyikense Summerh.	Tanzania, Zimbabwe, Zambia, Malawi	1,300–2,500 metres (4,300–8,200 ft)
	Mystacidium venosum Harv. ex Rolfe in W.H.Harvey	South Africa, Swaziland, Mozambique	500–1,700 metres (1,600–5,600 ft)
