= Taeniorrhiza =

Scientific classification
- Kingdom: Plantae
- Clade: Tracheophytes
- Clade: Angiosperms
- Clade: Monocots
- Order: Asparagales
- Family: Orchidaceae
- Subfamily: Epidendroideae
- Tribe: Vandeae
- Subtribe: Angraecinae
- Genus: Taeniorrhiza; Summerh.
- Species: T. gabonensis

Binomial name
- Taeniorrhiza gabonensis Summerh.

Genus of orchids

Taeniorrhiza is a monotypic genus of flowering plants from the orchid family, Orchidaceae. The sole species is Taeniorrhiza gabonensis. It is native to Gabon and the Democratic Republic of the Congo in central Africa.

== See also ==
- List of Orchidaceae genera
