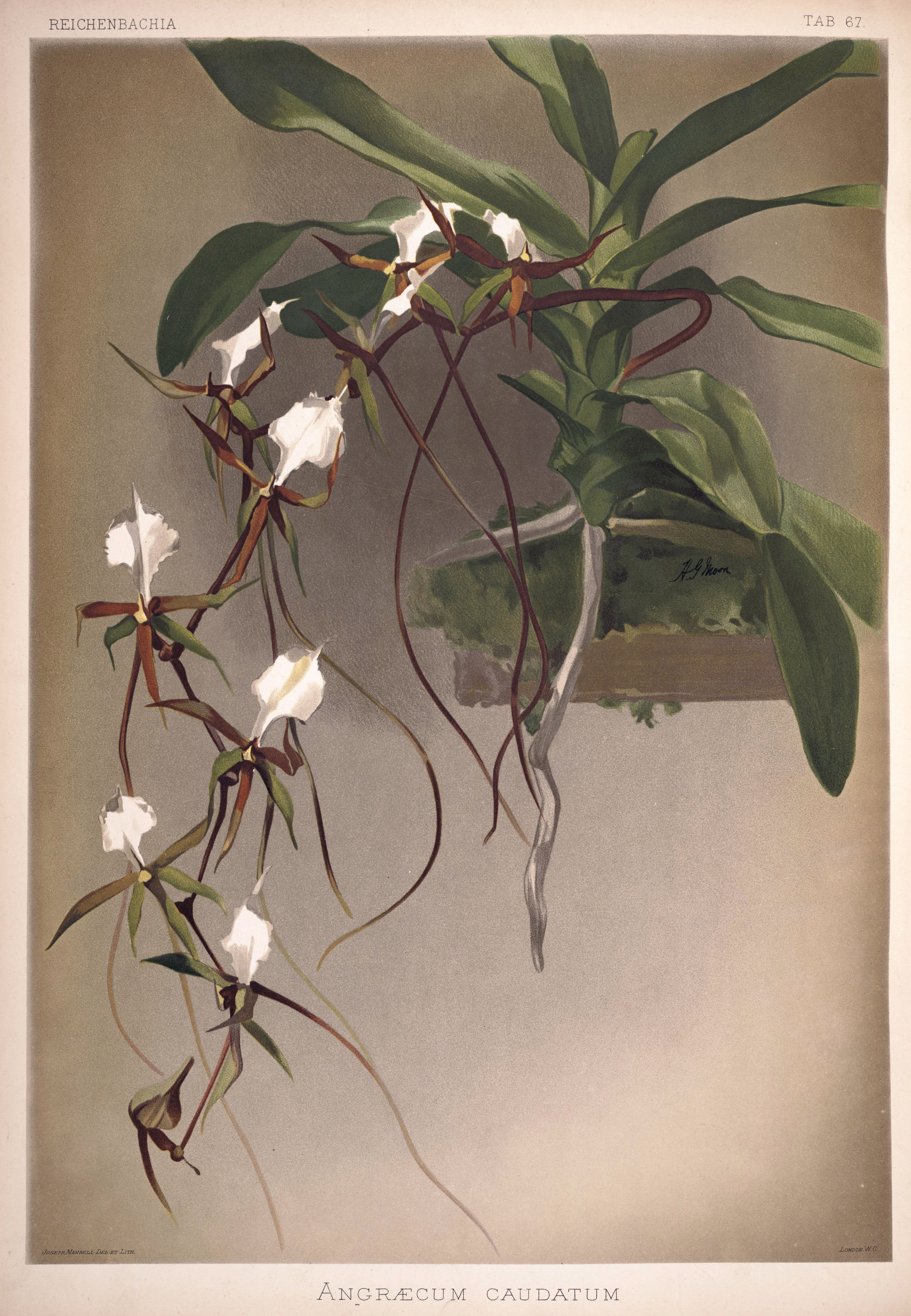
- Illustration by Henry Frederick Conrad Sander

Scientific classification
- Kingdom: Plantae
- Clade: Tracheophytes
- Clade: Angiosperms
- Clade: Monocots
- Order: Asparagales
- Family: Orchidaceae
- Subfamily: Epidendroideae
- Tribe: Vandeae
- Subtribe: Angraecinae
- Genus: Plectrelminthus; Raf.
- Species: P. caudatus

Binomial name
- Plectrelminthus caudatus (Lindl.) Summerh

Synonyms
- Angraecum caudatum Lindl; Listrostachys caudata (Lindl.) Rchb.f. in W.G.Walpers; Angorchis caudata (Lindl.) Kuntze; Leptocentrum caudatum (Lindl.) Schltr.; Plectrelminthus bicolor Raf.

= Plectrelminthus =

Genus of orchids

Plectrelminthus is a genus of flowering plants from the orchid family, Orchidaceae. Only one species is currently accepted, Plectrelminthus caudatus, though two varieties are recognized (as of June 2014):

- Plectrelminthus caudatus var. caudatus - western and central Africa from Sierra Leone to Congo-Kinshasa
- Plectrelminthus caudatus var. trilobatus Szlach. & Olszewski - Cameroon, Central African Republic

== See also ==
- List of Orchidaceae genera
