= Nephrangis =

- Nephrangis bertauxiana

Scientific classification
- Kingdom: Plantae
- Clade: Tracheophytes
- Clade: Angiosperms
- Clade: Monocots
- Order: Asparagales
- Family: Orchidaceae
- Subfamily: Epidendroideae
- Tribe: Vandeae
- Subtribe: Angraecinae
- Genus: Nephrangis (Schltr.) Summerh.

Genus of orchids

Nephrangis is a genus of flowering plants from the orchid family, Orchidaceae. It contains two known species, both native to tropical Africa.

- Nephrangis bertauxiana Szlach. & Olszewski - Cameroon, Gabon
- Nephrangis filiformis (Kraenzl.) Summerh. - widespread from Liberia to Tanzania, south to Zambia

== See also ==
- List of Orchidaceae genera
