= Rhaesteria =

Scientific classification
- Kingdom: Plantae
- Clade: Tracheophytes
- Clade: Angiosperms
- Clade: Monocots
- Order: Asparagales
- Family: Orchidaceae
- Subfamily: Epidendroideae
- Tribe: Vandeae
- Subtribe: Angraecinae
- Genus: Rhaesteria; Summerh.
- Species: R. eggelingii

Binomial name
- Rhaesteria eggelingii Summerh.

Species of plant

Rhaesteria is a monotypic genus of flowering plants from the orchid family, Orchidaceae. The sole species is Rhaesteria eggelingii, native to Rwanda and Uganda.

== See also ==
- List of Orchidaceae genera
