= Chauliodon =

Scientific classification
- Kingdom: Plantae
- Clade: Tracheophytes
- Clade: Angiosperms
- Clade: Monocots
- Order: Asparagales
- Family: Orchidaceae
- Subfamily: Epidendroideae
- Tribe: Vandeae
- Subtribe: Angraecinae
- Genus: Chauliodon; Summerh.
- Species: C. deflexicalcaratum

Binomial name
- Chauliodon deflexicalcaratum (De Wild.) L.Jonss.

Synonyms
- Angraecum deflexicalcaratum De Wild.; Gussonea deflexicalcarata (De Wild.) Schltr.; Microcoelia deflexicalcarata (De Wild.) Summerh.; Chauliodon buntingii Summerh. (type species)

Genus of orchids

Chauliodon is a genus of flowering plants from the orchid family, Orchidaceae. It contains only one known species, Chauliodon deflexicalcaratum, native to tropical Africa (Ghana, Ivory Coast, Liberia, Nigeria, Cameroon, Gabon, Congo-Kinshasa).

== See also ==
- List of Orchidaceae genera
