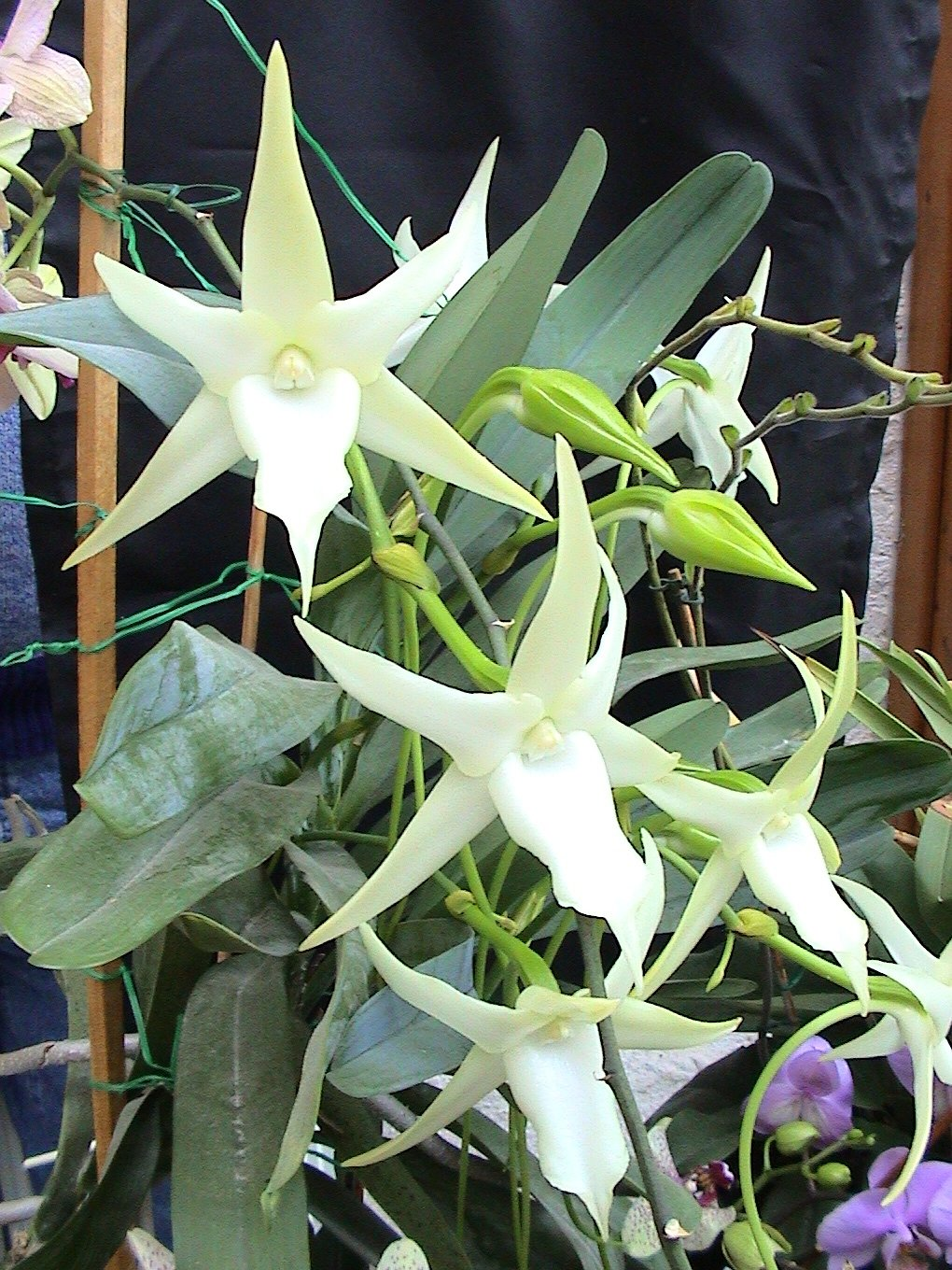
- Angraecum sesquipedale

Scientific classification
- Kingdom: Plantae
- Clade: Tracheophytes
- Clade: Angiosperms
- Clade: Monocots
- Order: Asparagales
- Family: Orchidaceae
- Subfamily: Epidendroideae
- Tribe: Vandeae
- Subtribe: Angraecinae; Summerh.

Type genus
- Angraecum Bory

Genera
- See text

Synonyms
- Aerangidinae Summerh. (1966); Schltr. (1920); Podanginae Brieger (1971); Bolusiellinae Szlach. (1995); Listrostachyinae Szlach. (1995); Calyptrochilinae Szlach. (1995); Rhaesterinae Szlach. (1995)

= Angraecinae =

Subtribe of orchids

Angraecinae is a subtribe in the family Orchidaceae. The subtribe consists of approximately 47 genera. The type genus is Angraecum. Most of the genera are endemic to Africa, Madagascar and other Indian Ocean Islands, a few genera can also be found in the Americas.

== Taxonomy ==
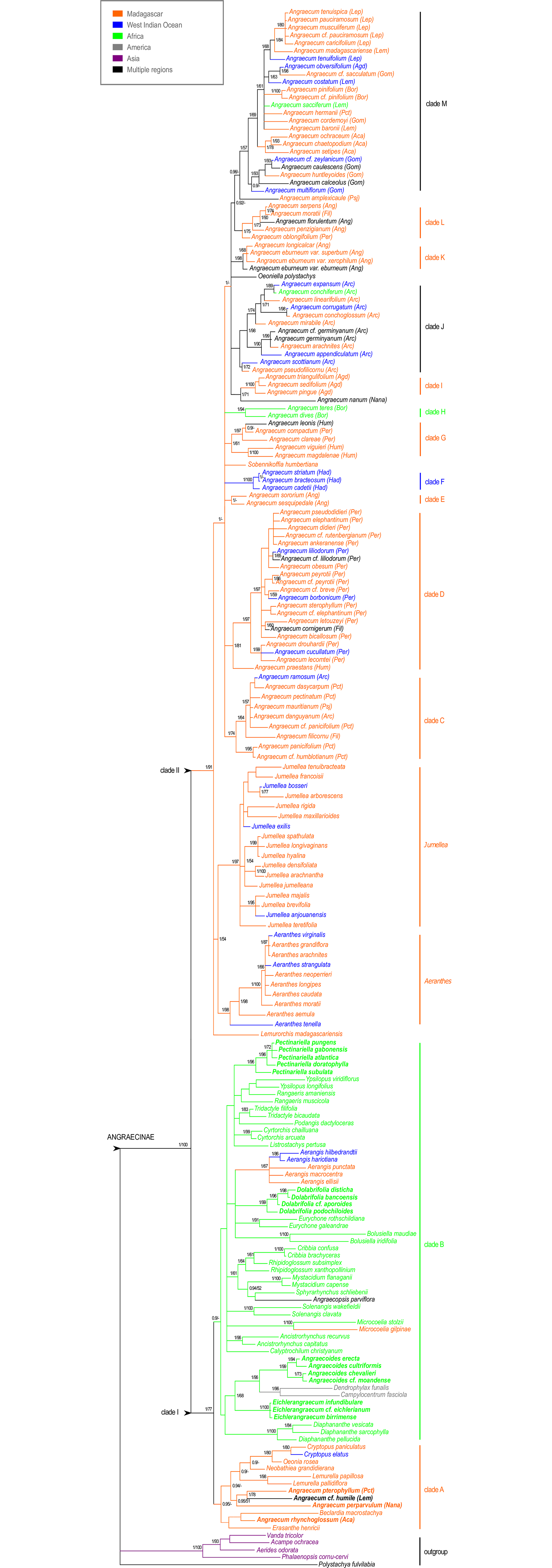
Angraecinae phylogeny.

Recent scholarship has led to proposed reorganization of this subtribe. The proposed change would have Campylocentrum and all leafless Neotropical genera transferred to a new subtribe under tribe Vandeae to be called Campylocentrinae. That would leave only the Palaeotropical genera in the Angraecum alliance within this subtribe. There is, however, not sufficient scientific agreement to justify moving the "Campylocentrinae" at this time.

Angraecum Alliance

- Aeranthes Lindl., 1824 (47 spp.)
- Ambrella H. Perrier., 1934 (1 sp.)
- Angraecum Bory, 1804 (219 spp.)
- Calyptrochilum Kraenzl. (2 spp.)
- Cryptopus Lindl. (4 spp.)
- Jumellea Schltr., 1914 (58 spp.)
- Lemurella Schltr., 1925 (4 spp.)
- Lemurorchis Kraenzl., 1893 (1 sp.)
- Neobathiea Schltr., 1925 (5 spp.)
- Oeonia Lindl., 1826 (6 spp.)
- Oeoniella Schltr., 1918 (2 spp.)
- Podangis Schltr., 1918 (2 spp.)
- Sobennikoffia Schltr., 1925 (4 spp.)

Campylocentrum Alliance

- Campylocentrum Lindl., 1835 (73 spp.)
- Dendrophylax Rchb.f. (9 spp.)

== Phylogeny ==
The subtribe Angraecinae (incl. Aerangidinae) is the sister group to the subtribe Aeridinae:

- Vandeae s.l.
  - - - Aeridinae
      - Angraecinae (including Aerangidinae)
    - Adrorhizinae
  - Polystachyinae

== Genera ==
- Aerangis
- Aeranthes Lindl., 1824 (47 spp.)
- Ambrella H. Perrier., 1934 (1 sp.)
- Ancistrorhynchus
- Angraecopsis
- Angraecum Bory, 1804 (219 spp.)
- Beclardia
- Bolusiella
- Calyptrochilum Kraenzl. (2 spp.)
- Campylocentrum Lindl., 1835 (73 spp.)
- Cardiochilos
- Chauliodon
- Cribbia
- Cryptopus Lindl. (4 spp.)
- Cyrtorchis
- Dendrophylax Rchb.f. (9 spp.)
- Diaphananthe
- Dinklageella
- Eggelingia
- Erasanthe
- Eurychone
- Jumellea Schltr., 1914 (58 spp.)
- Lemurella Schltr., 1925 (4 spp.)
- Lemurorchis Kraenzl., 1893 (1 sp.)
- Listrostachys
- Margelliantha
- Microcoelia
- Mystacidium
- Neobathiea Schltr., 1925 (5 spp.)
- Nephrangis
- Oeonia Lindl., 1826 (6 spp.)
- Oeoniella Schltr., 1918 (2 spp.)
- Ossiculum P.J.Cribb & Laan, 1986 (1 sp.)
- Plectrelminthus
- Podangis Schltr., 1918 (1 sp.)
- Rangaeris
- Rhaesteria
- Rhipidoglossum
- Sobennikoffia Schltr., 1925 (4 spp.)
- Solenangis
- Sphyrarhynchus
- Summerhayesia
- Taeniorrhiza
- Triceratorhynchus
- Tridactyle
- Ypsilopus

=== Some species ===
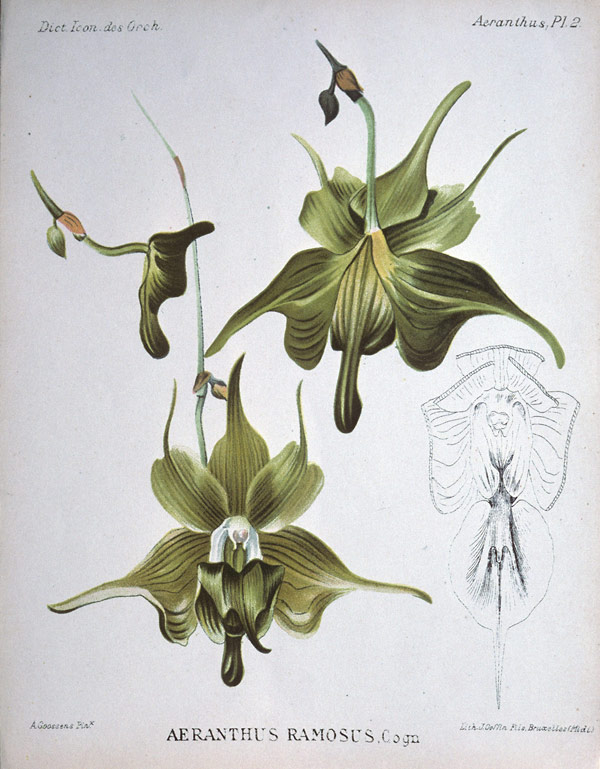
Aeranthes ramosa

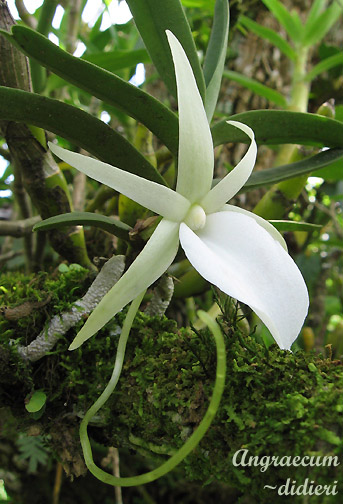
Angraecum didieri

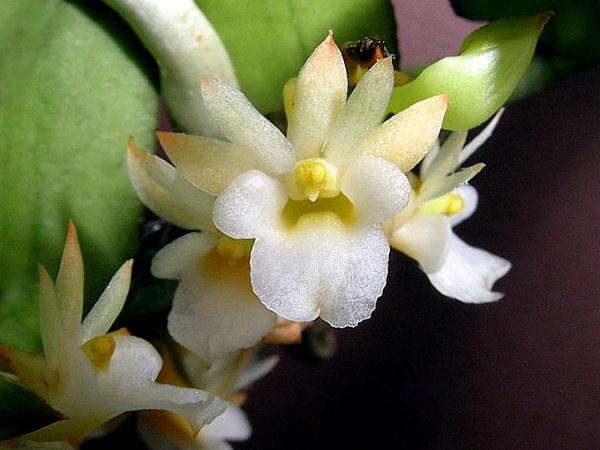
Calyptrochilum christyanum

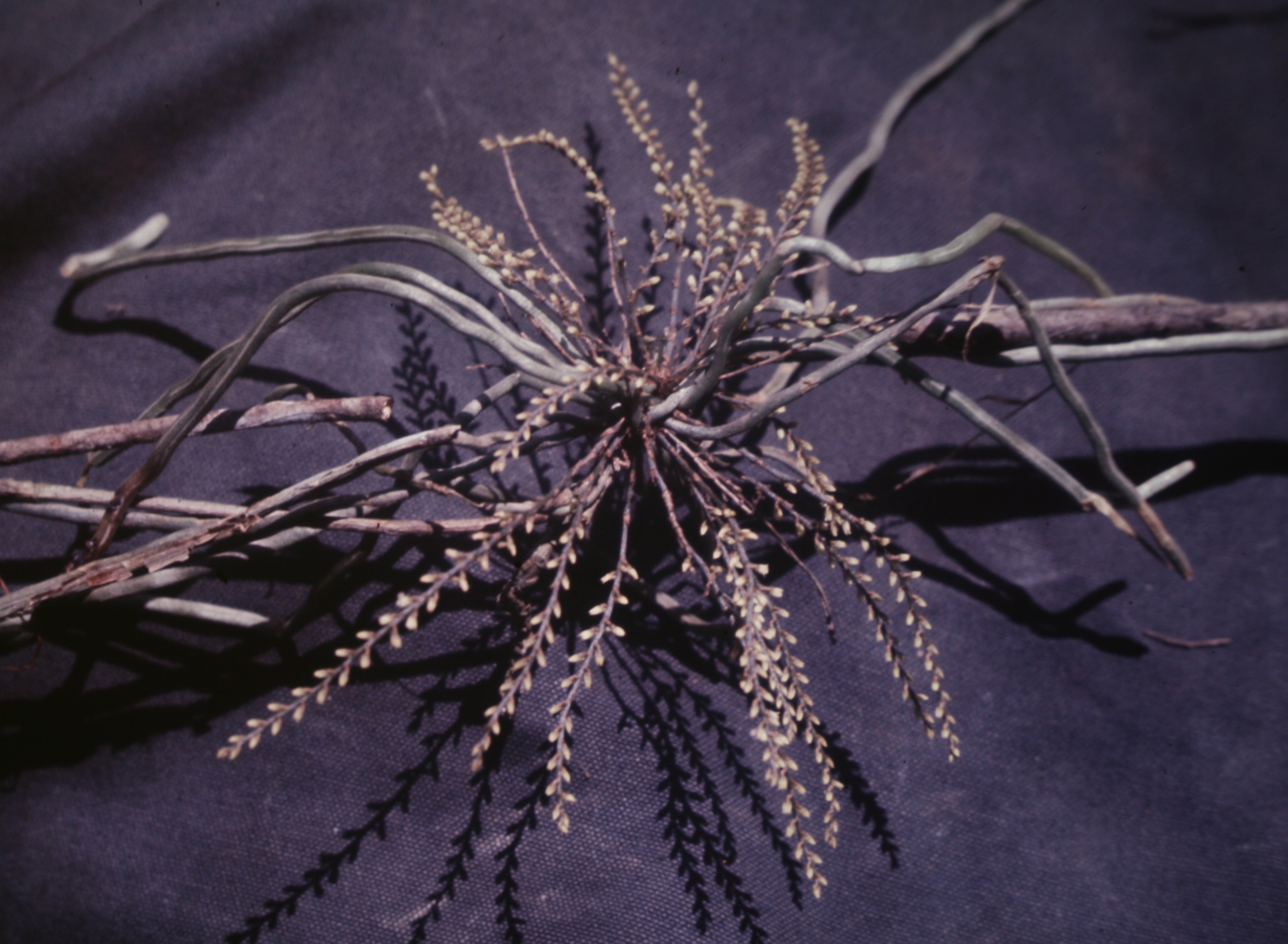
Campylocentrum fasciola

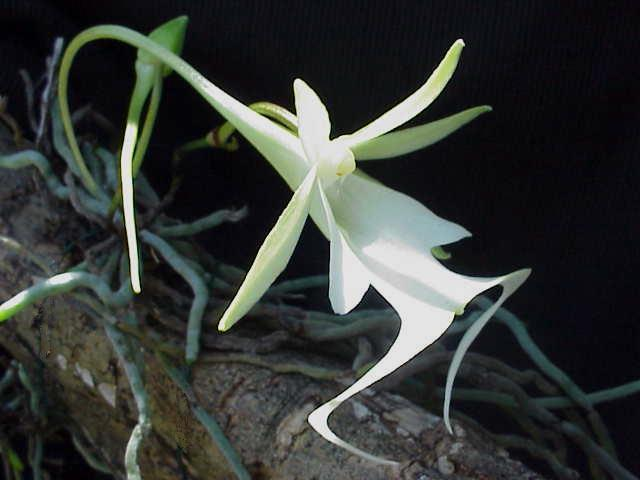
Dendrophylax lindenii

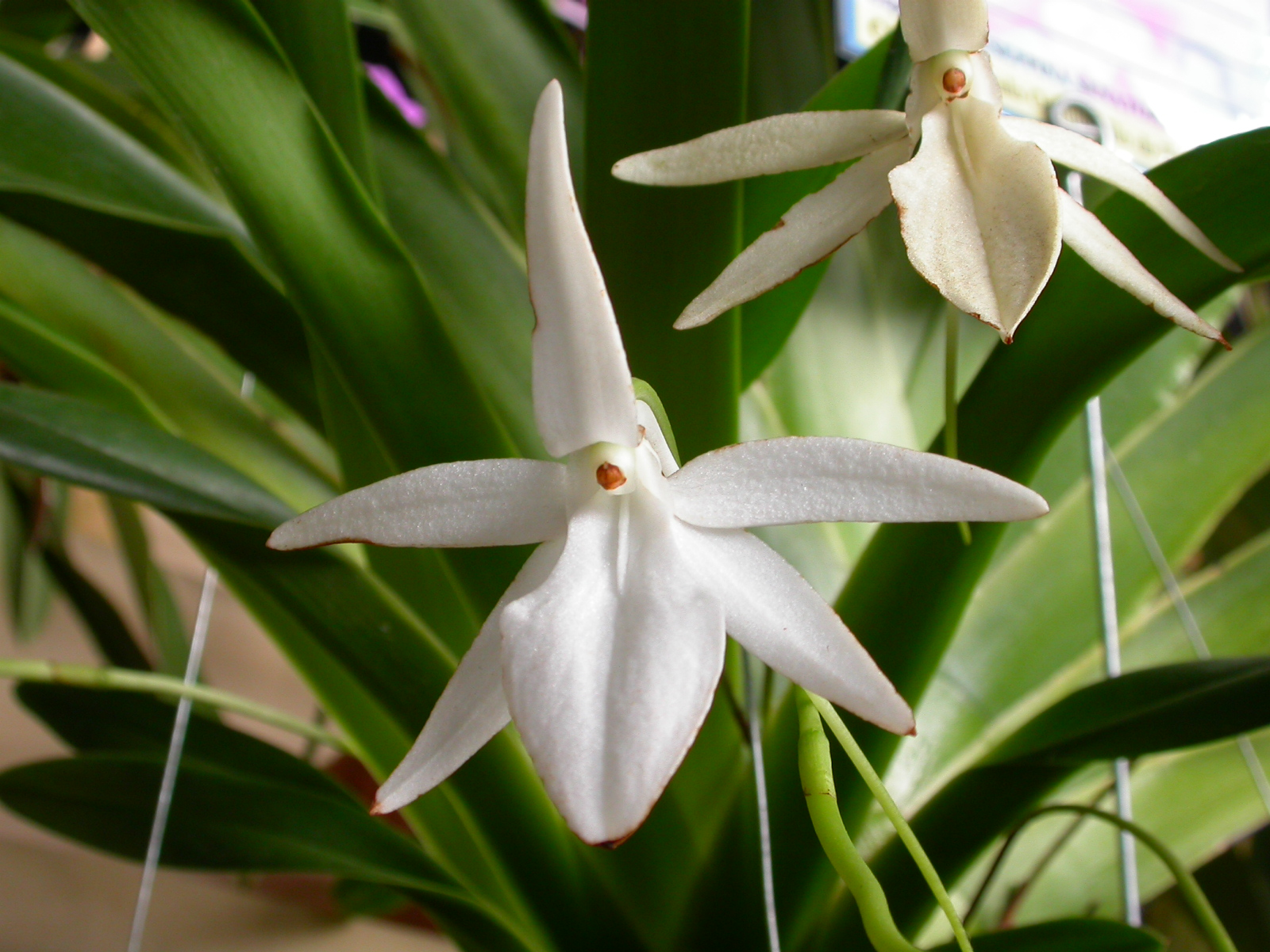
Jumellea arachnantha

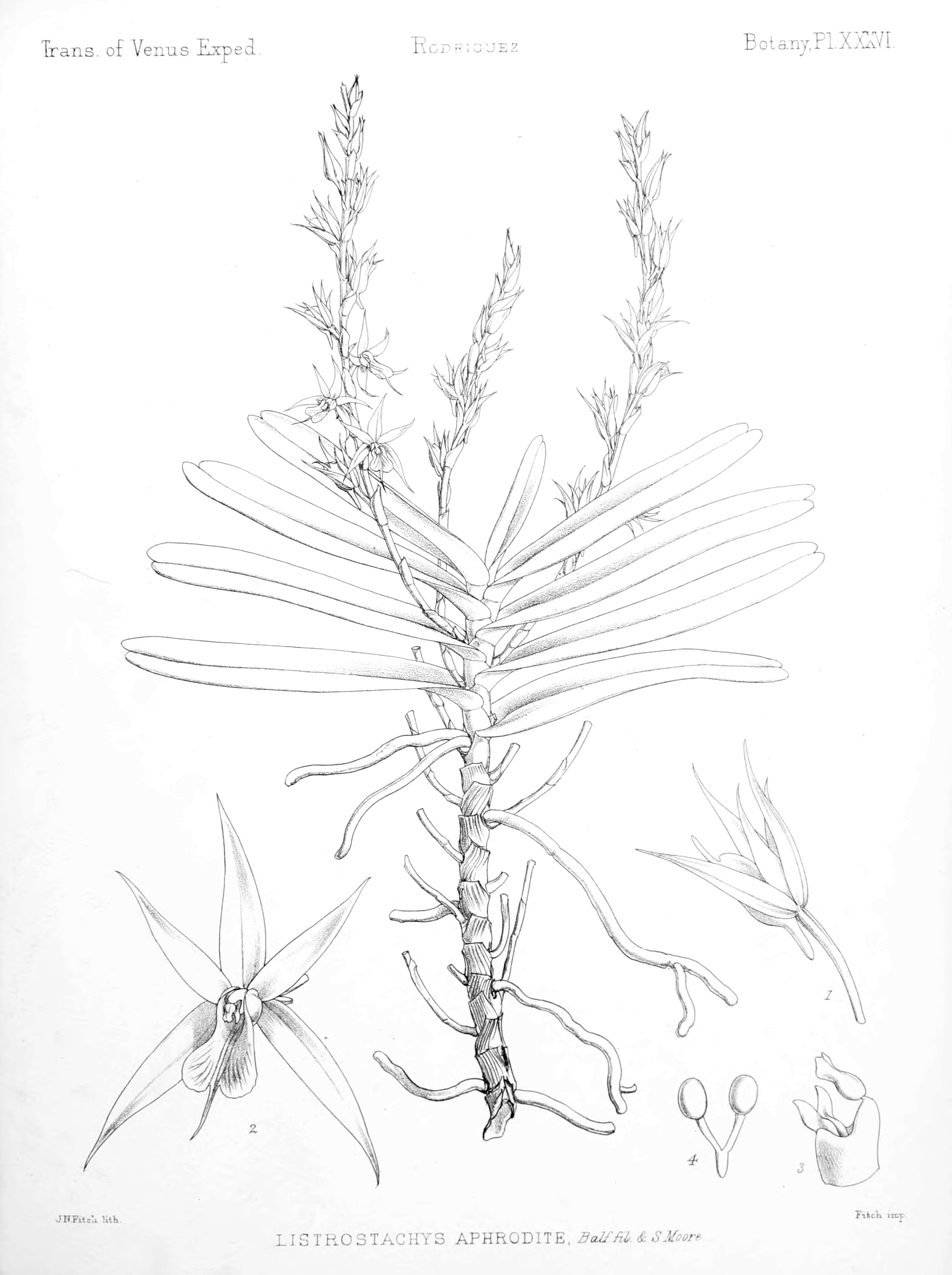
Oeoniella aphrodite

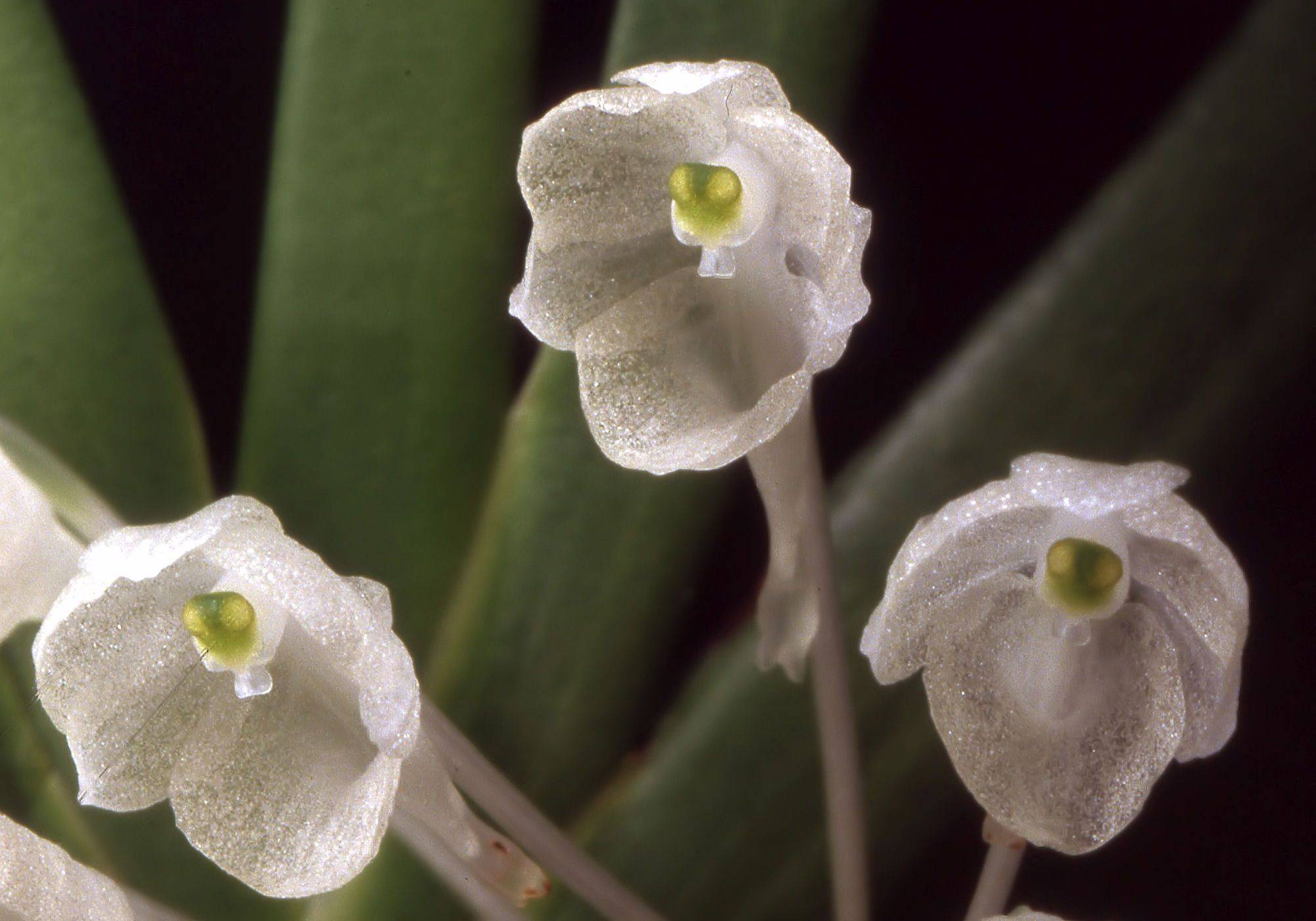
Podangis dactyloceras
