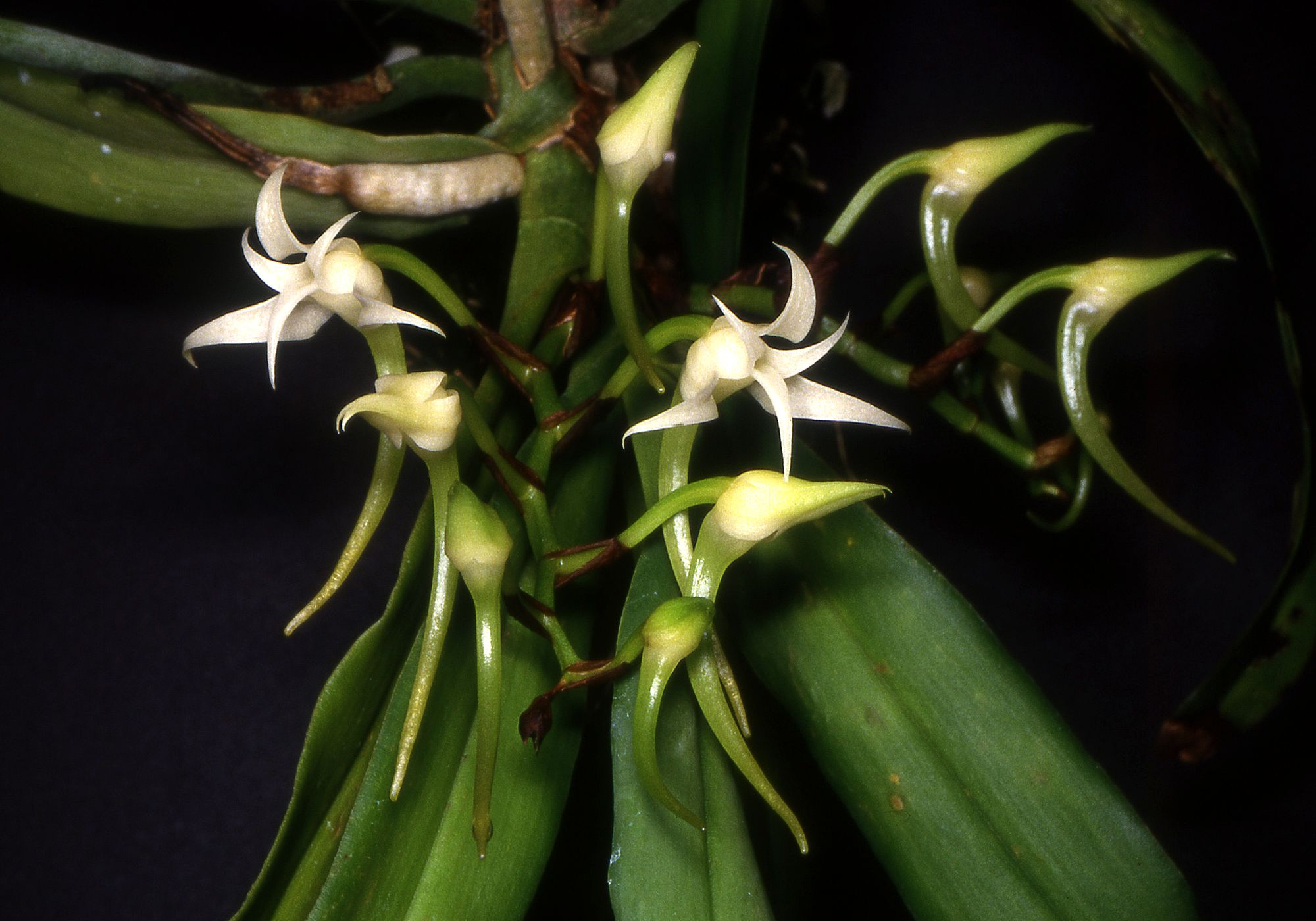
- Cyrtorchis arcuata cultivated in a botanical garden

Scientific classification
- Kingdom: Plantae
- Clade: Tracheophytes
- Clade: Angiosperms
- Clade: Monocots
- Order: Asparagales
- Family: Orchidaceae
- Subfamily: Epidendroideae
- Tribe: Vandeae
- Subtribe: Angraecinae
- Genus: Cyrtorchis; Schltr.

Type species
- Cyrtorchis arcuata (Lindl.) Schltr.

Synonyms
- Homocolleticon (Summerh.) Szlach. & Olszewski

= Cyrtorchis =

Genus of orchids

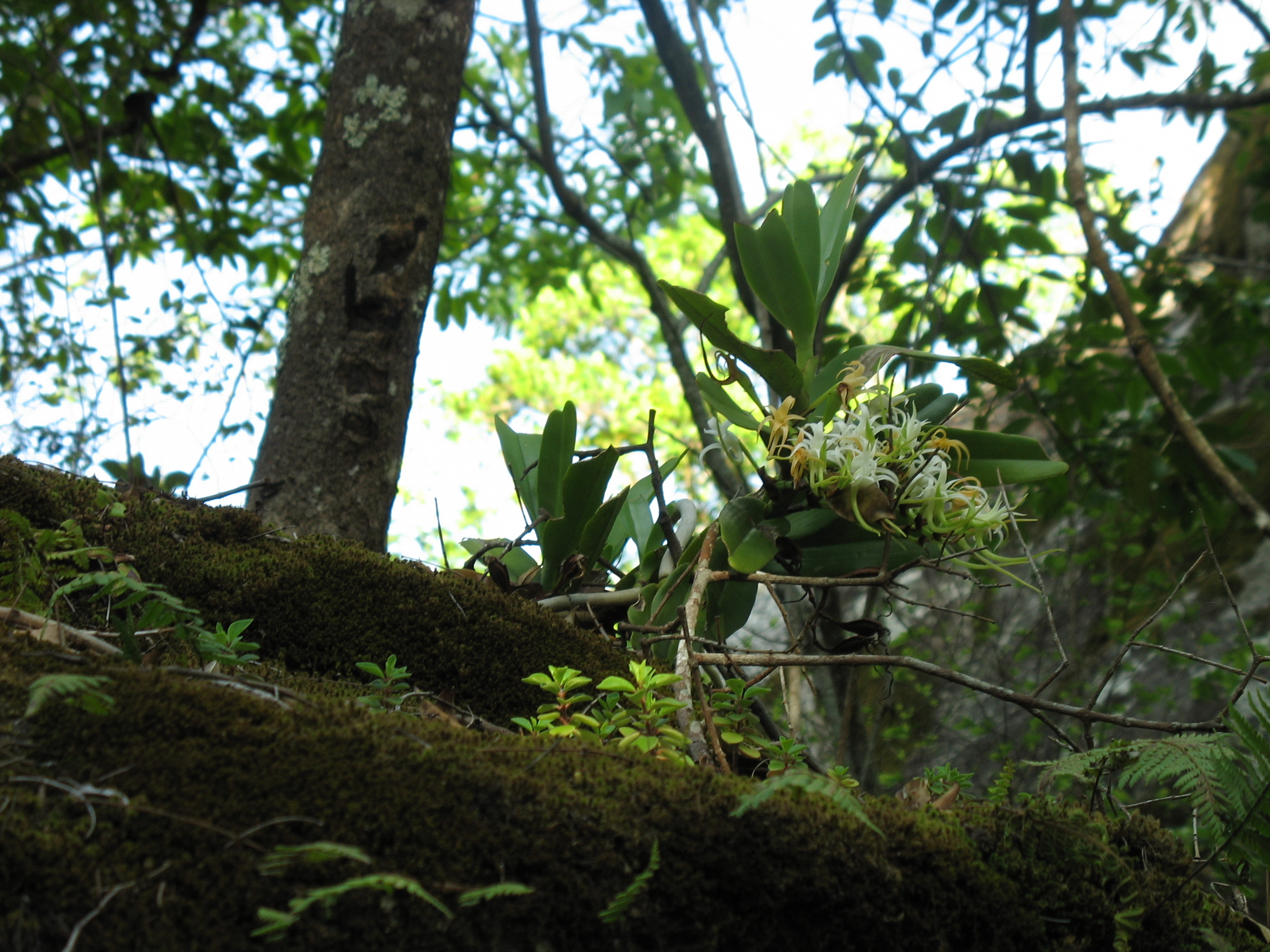
Photo of Cyrtorchis praetermissa Summerh. growing on a rock at the foot of the Mulanje Massif in Malawi

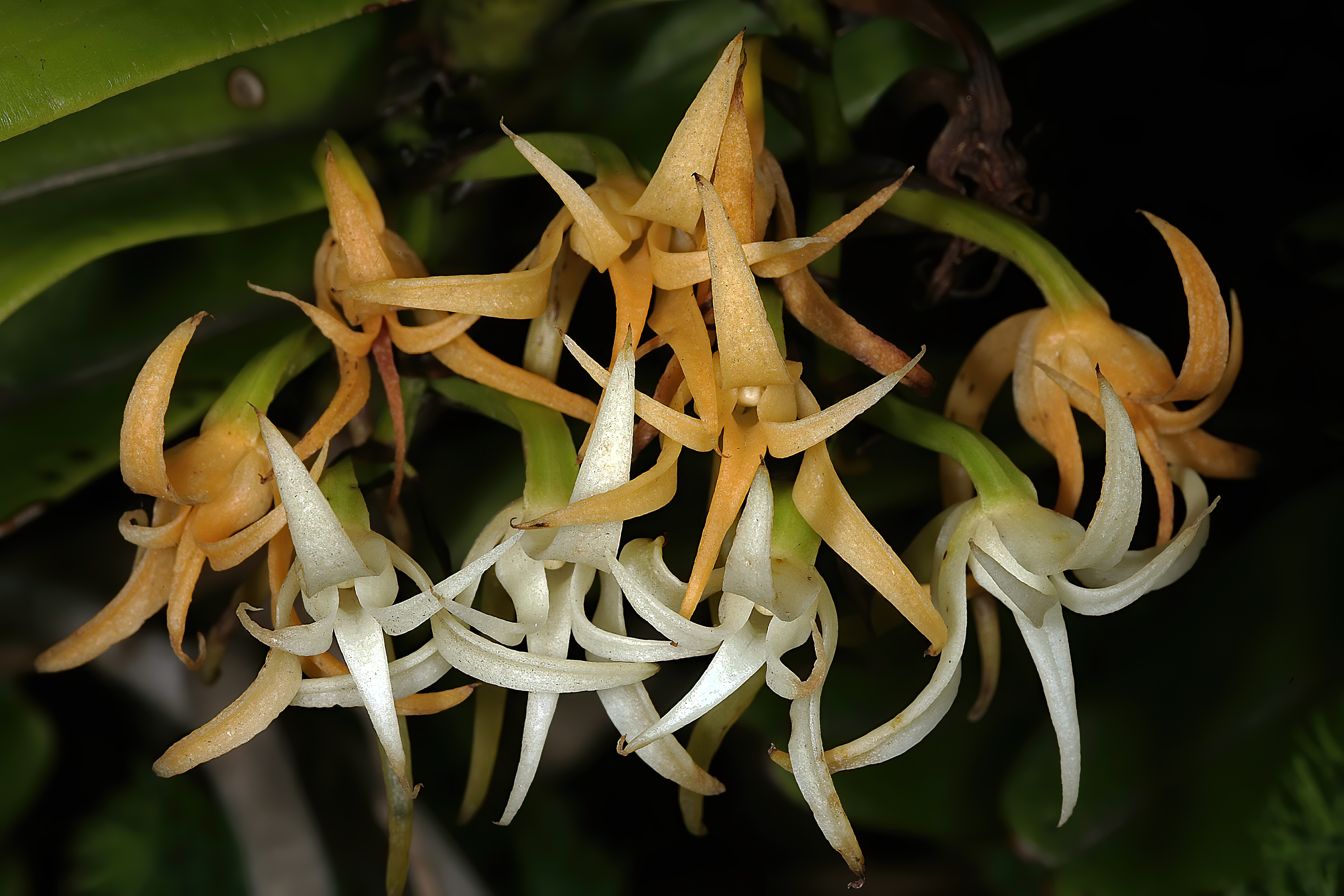
Shift in floral colouration from white to orange in an Cyrtorchis arcuata subsp. arcuata inflorescence due to senescence, which is characteristic for this genus

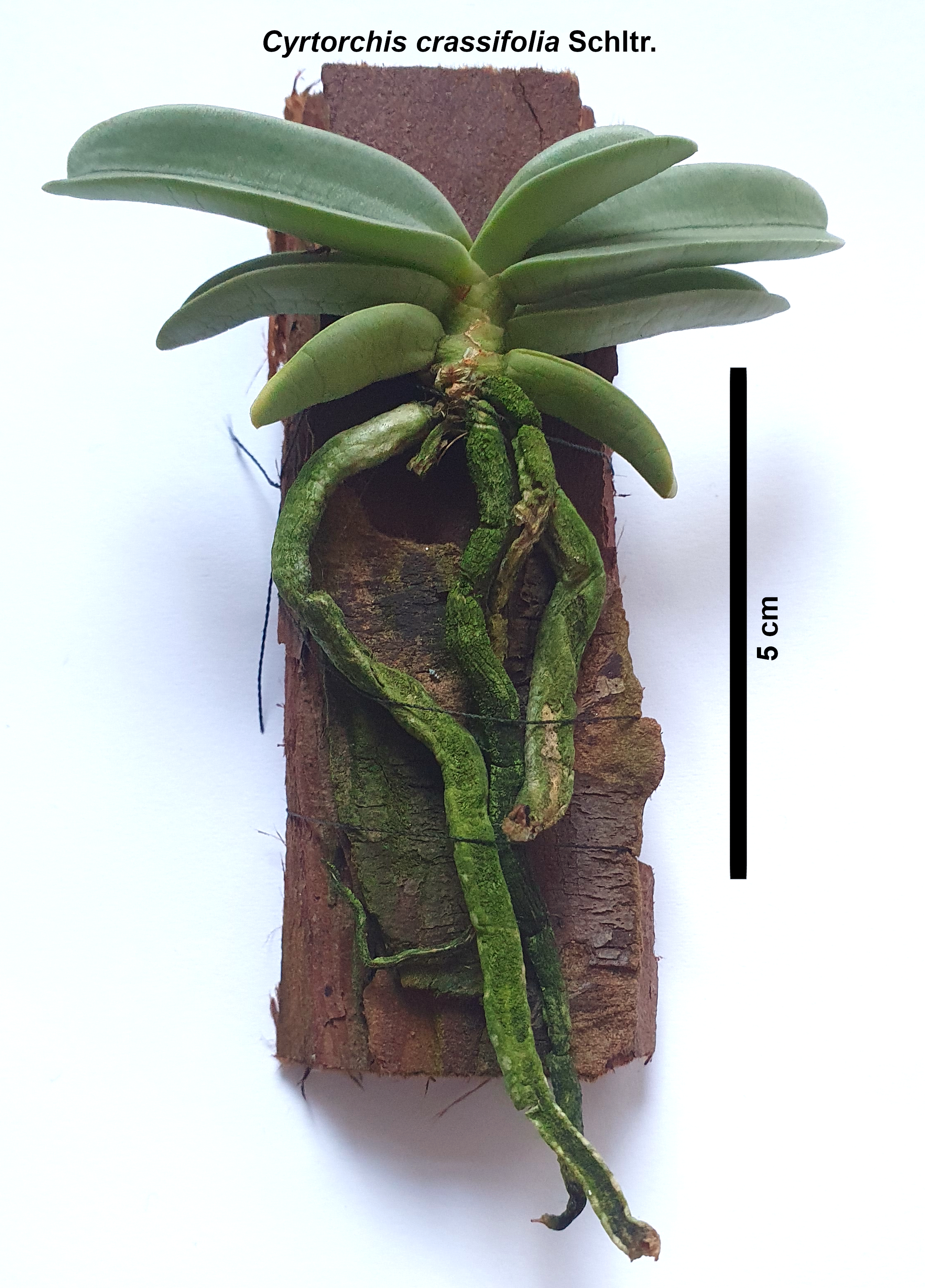
Cyrtorchis crassifolia Schltr.

Cyrtorchis is a genus of flowering plants from the orchid family Orchidaceae native to Africa.

== Description ==
The species of the genus Cyrtorchis are epiphytic or lithophytic herbs, which do not have pseudobulbs. The white, fragrant, star-shaped flowers are distinctly spurred.

== Cytology ==
The diploid chromosome count of Cyrtorchis arcuata is 2n = 46.

== Physiology ==
Cyrtorchis is known to utilize the crassulacean acid metabolism, which entails photosynthesis during the daytime, and gaseous exchange through open stomata during the night. This enables the plant to save water.

== Etymology ==
The generic name Cyrtorchis is composed of the Greek words "kirtos" meaning curved and "orchis" meaning testicles, which refers to orchids.

== Taxonomy ==
The genus has been proven to be monophyletic.

=== Sections ===
The genus has been divided into the sections Cyrtorchis section Homocolleticon Summerh. and Cyrtorchis section Cyrtorchis based on differences in the shape of the viscidium. Originally the section Cyrtorchis was published as section Heterocolleticon Summerh., but it is now known as Cyrtorchis section Cyrtorchis. The section Homocolleticon is characterized by an uniformly textured viscidium, in contrast to the viscidium of section Cyrtorchis, which consists of two distinct zones.

The section Homocolleticon Summerh. was elevated to a genus by Szlach. & Olszewski in 2001, but Homocolleticon (Summerh.) Szlach. & Olszewski is now a synonym of Cyrtorchis Schltr.

=== Species ===
As of December 2022, there are 19 currently accepted species:

1. Cyrtorchis arcuata (Lindl.) Schltr.
2. Cyrtorchis aschersonii (Kraenzl.) Schltr.
3. Cyrtorchis brownii (Rolfe) Schltr.
4. Cyrtorchis chailluana (Hook.f.) Schltr.
5. Cyrtorchis crassifolia Schltr. in R.E.Fries
6. Cyrtorchis erythraeae (Rolfe) Schltr.
7. Cyrtorchis glaucifolia Summerh.
8. Cyrtorchis guillaumetii (Pérez-Vera) R.Rice
9. Cyrtorchis hamata (Rolfe) Schltr.
10. Cyrtorchis henriquesiana (Ridl.) Schltr.
11. Cyrtorchis injoloensis (De Wild.) Schltr.
12. Cyrtorchis letouzeyi Szlach. & Olszewski
13. Cyrtorchis monteiroae (Rchb.f.) Schltr.
14. Cyrtorchis neglecta Summerh.
15. Cyrtorchis okuensis Droissart, Azandi & M.Simo
16. Cyrtorchis praetermissa Summerh.
17. Cyrtorchis ringens (Rchb.f.) Summerh
18. Cyrtorchis seretii (De Wild.) Schltr.
19. Cyrtorchis submontana Stévart, Droissart & Azandi

=== Species formerly placed in Cyrtorchis ===
- Cyrtorchis cufodontii Chiov. is now considered to be a synonym of Ypsilopus amaniensis (Kraenzl.) D'haijère & Stévart
- Cyrtorchis refracta (Kraenzl.) Schltr. is now considered to be a synonym of Ancistrorhynchus refractus (Kraenzl.) Summerh.

== Ecology ==
=== Habitat ===
It grows in dense forests and rainforests, as well as in plantations. It is found growing on tree trunks and branches, which receive high levels of sunlight. In addition to epiphytic growth, it can also grow as a lithophyte attached to rocks.

=== Pollination ===
Several hawk moth species of the genus Hippotion have been identified as likely pollinators of Cyrtorchis okuensis. The white flowers shift to an orange pollination after pollination or senescence. Such post-pollination behaviour is not uncommon, and it may be explained by a reduced attractivity of flowers to pollinators, if the flowers are no longer viable.

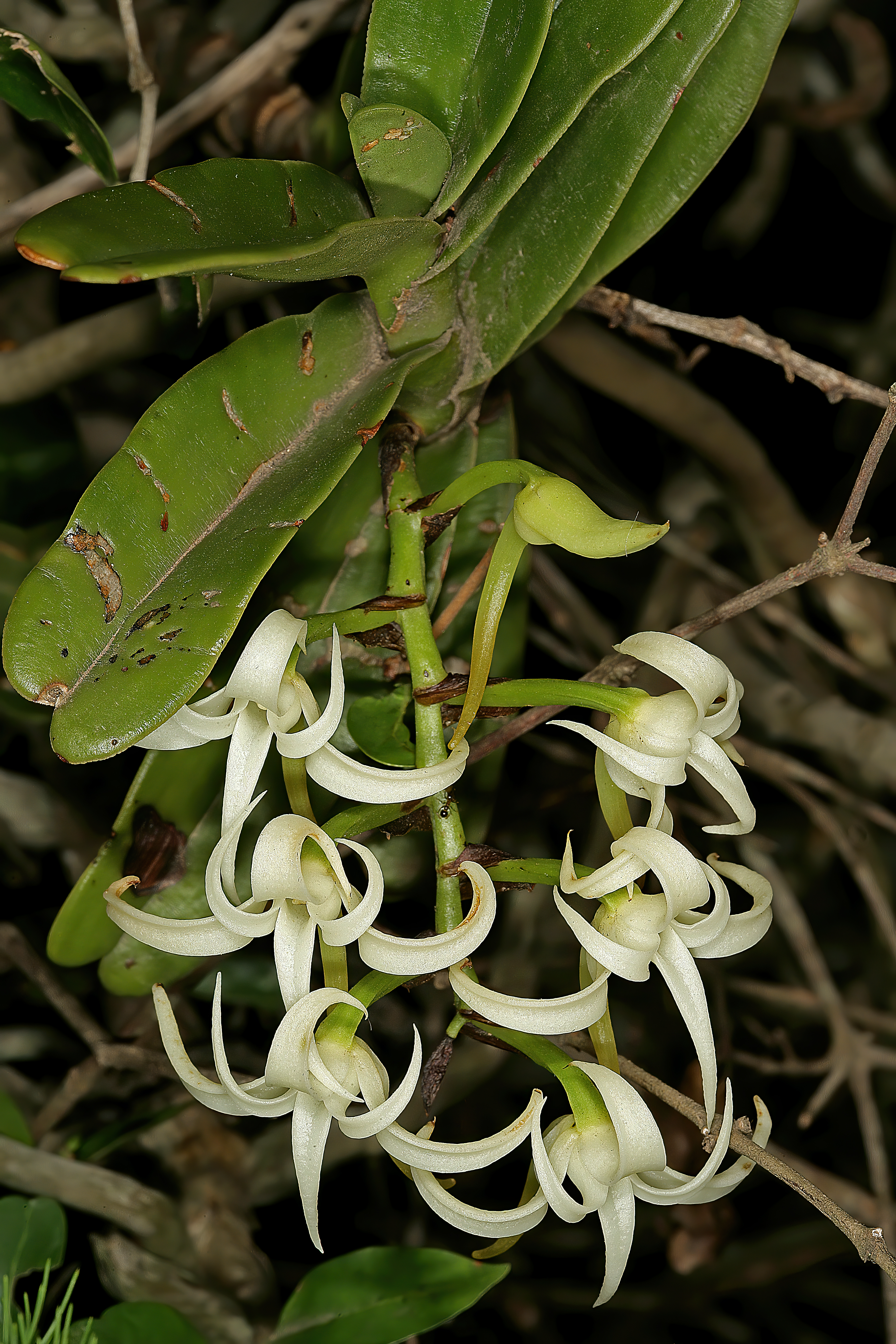
Young, viable Cyrtorchis arcuata inflorescence without discolouration

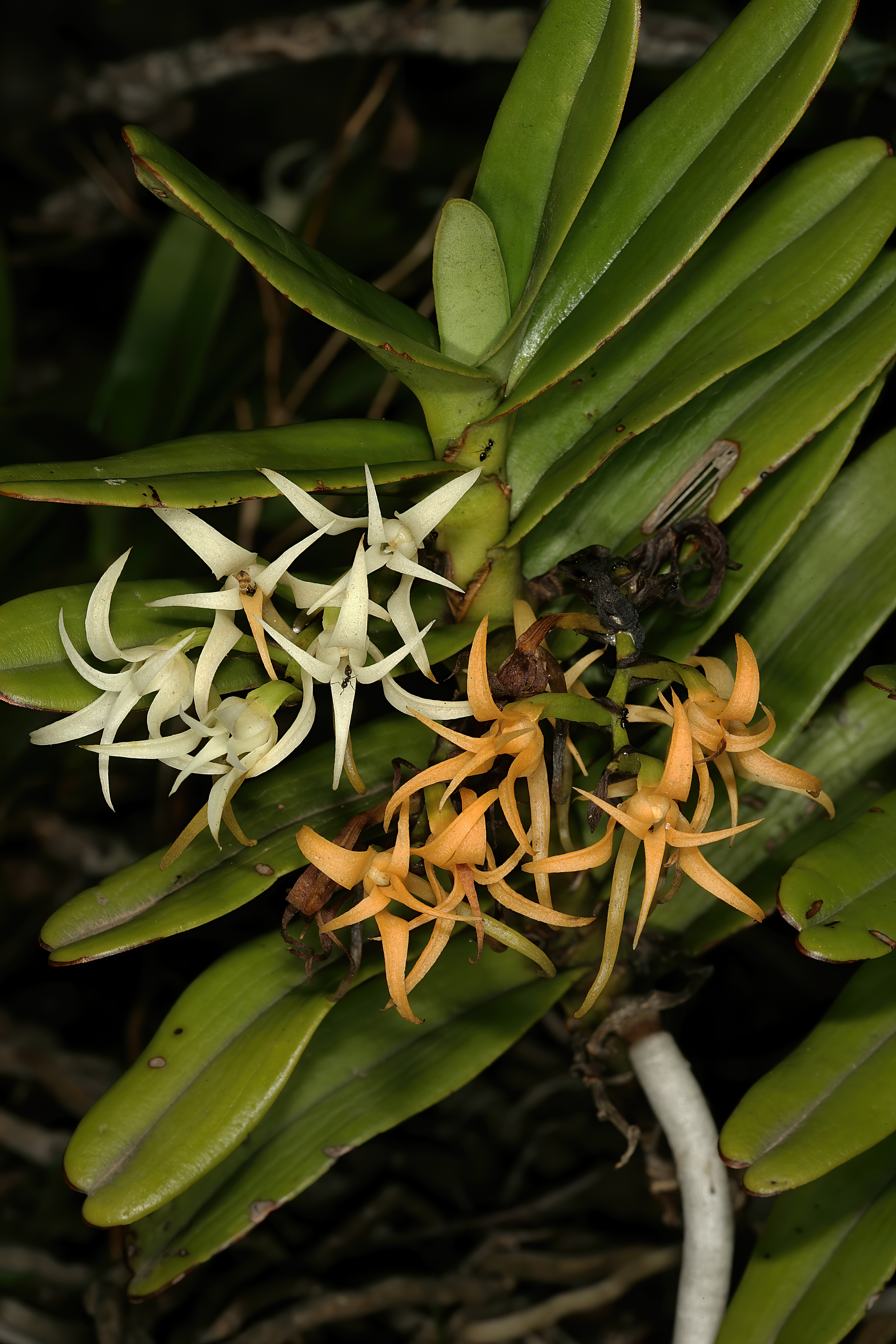
Older Cyrtorchis arcuata inflorescence exhibiting senescence and discolouration of older, non-viable flowers

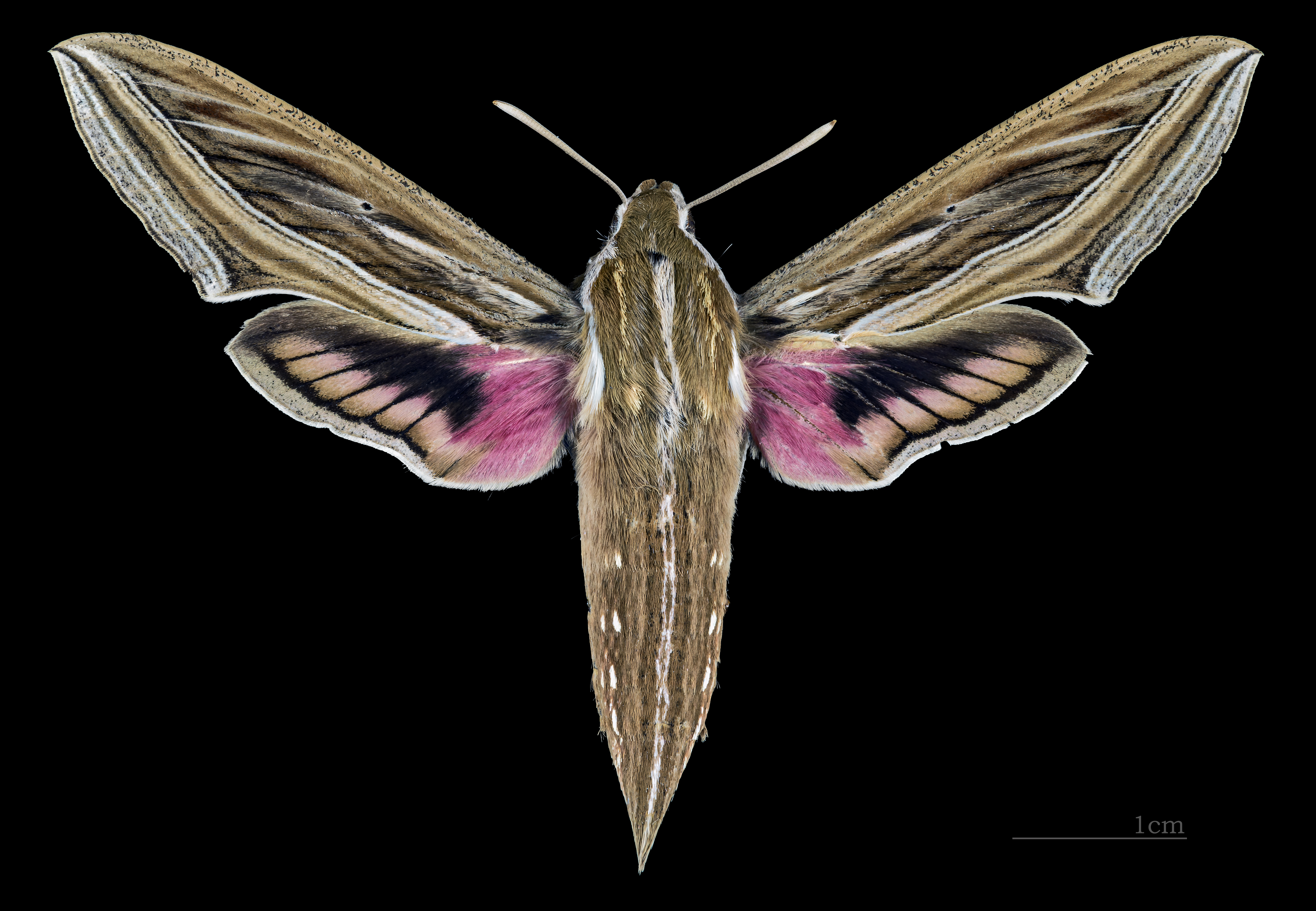
Hippotion celerio, a likely pollinator of Cyrtorchis okuensis

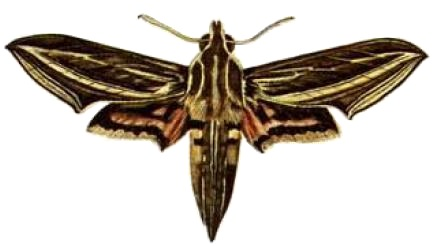
Hippotion osiris, a likely pollinator of Cyrtorchis okuensis

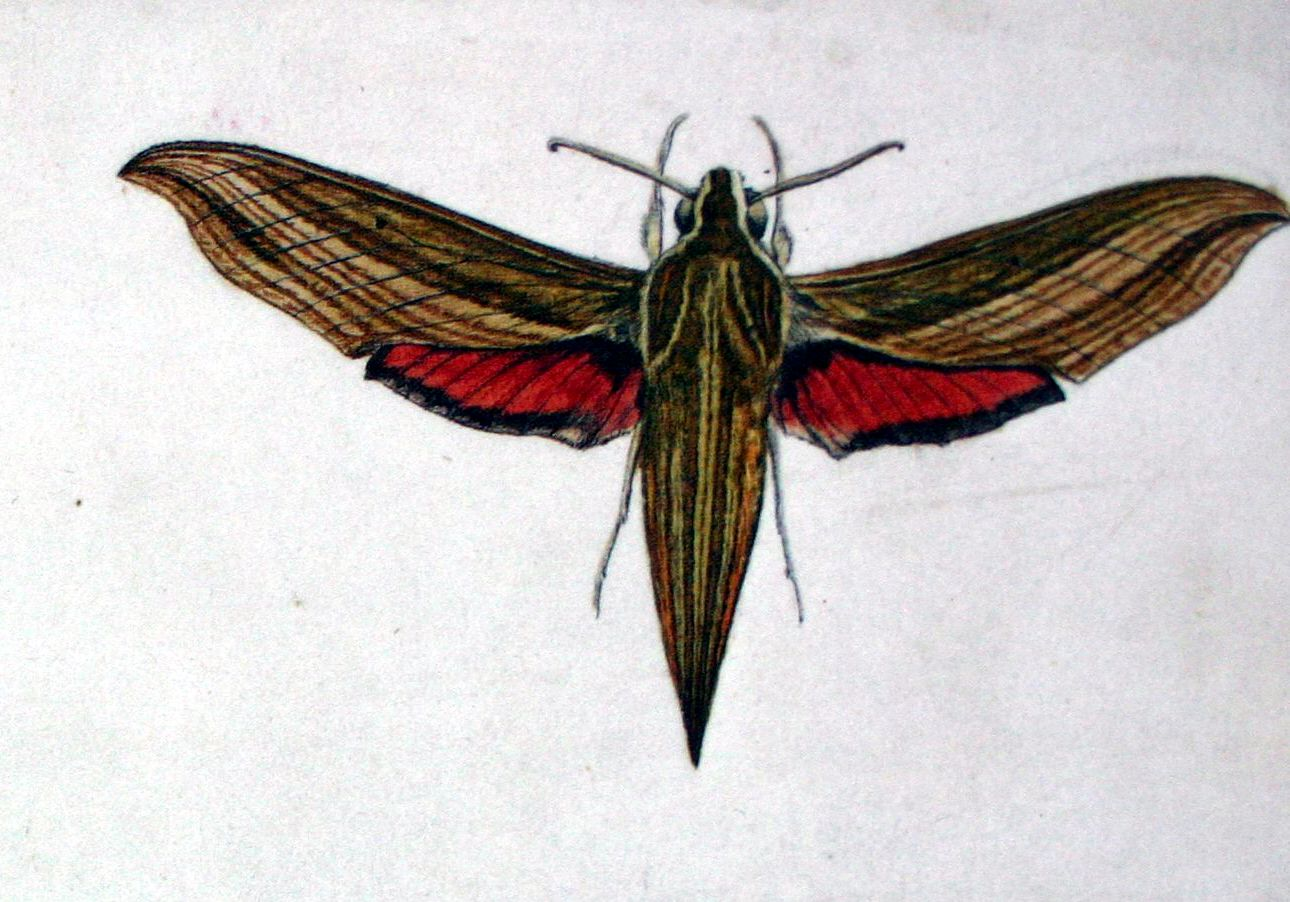
Hippotion eson, a likely pollinator of Cyrtorchis okuensis

== Conservation ==
Two species, namely Cyrtorchis letouzeyi Szlach. & Olszewski and Cyrtorchis henriquesiana (Ridl.) Schltr., have been categorized as species of least concern (LC) under the IUCN Red List criteria. Cyrtorchis arcuata subsp. arcuata has been categorized as a Least Concern species by the Red List of South African Plants. Another species, Cyrtorchis glaucifolia Summerh., has been categorized as an endangered (EN) species under the IUCN Red List criteria, and Cyrtorchis okuensis Droissart, Azandi & M.Simo is categorized as Near Threatened (NT).

== Horticulture ==
Cyrtorchis is easy to cultivate in well drained substrate. Cyrtorchis arcuata is most commonly found in private collections.

== See also ==
- List of Orchidaceae genera
