= Espinhassoa =

Scientific classification
- Kingdom: Plantae
- Clade: Tracheophytes
- Clade: Angiosperms
- Clade: Monocots
- Order: Asparagales
- Family: Orchidaceae
- Subfamily: Orchidoideae
- Tribe: Cranichideae
- Subtribe: Spiranthinae
- Genus: Espinhassoa; Salazar & J.A.N.Bat.

Species
- Espinhassoa glaziovii (Cogn.) Salazar & J.A.N.Bat.; Espinhassoa rhombiglossa (Pabst) Salazar & J.A.N.Bat.

Genus of flowering plants

Espinhassoa is a genus of orchids. It includes two species native to southeastern Brazil. The genus is named for the Espinhaço Mountains of Minas Gerais and Bahia states, which is their native range.

- Espinhassoa glaziovii (Cogn.) Salazar & J.A.N.Bat.
- Espinhassoa rhombiglossa (Pabst) Salazar & J.A.N.Bat.

The two species were formerly placed in Mesadenus, and were geographically disjunct from other species in the genus which are native to Mexico and Central America, the Caribbean, and the southeastern United States. A phylogenetic study published in 2019 found that Mesadenus was polyphyletic, and the two Brazilian species were placed in the new genus Espinhassoa.
