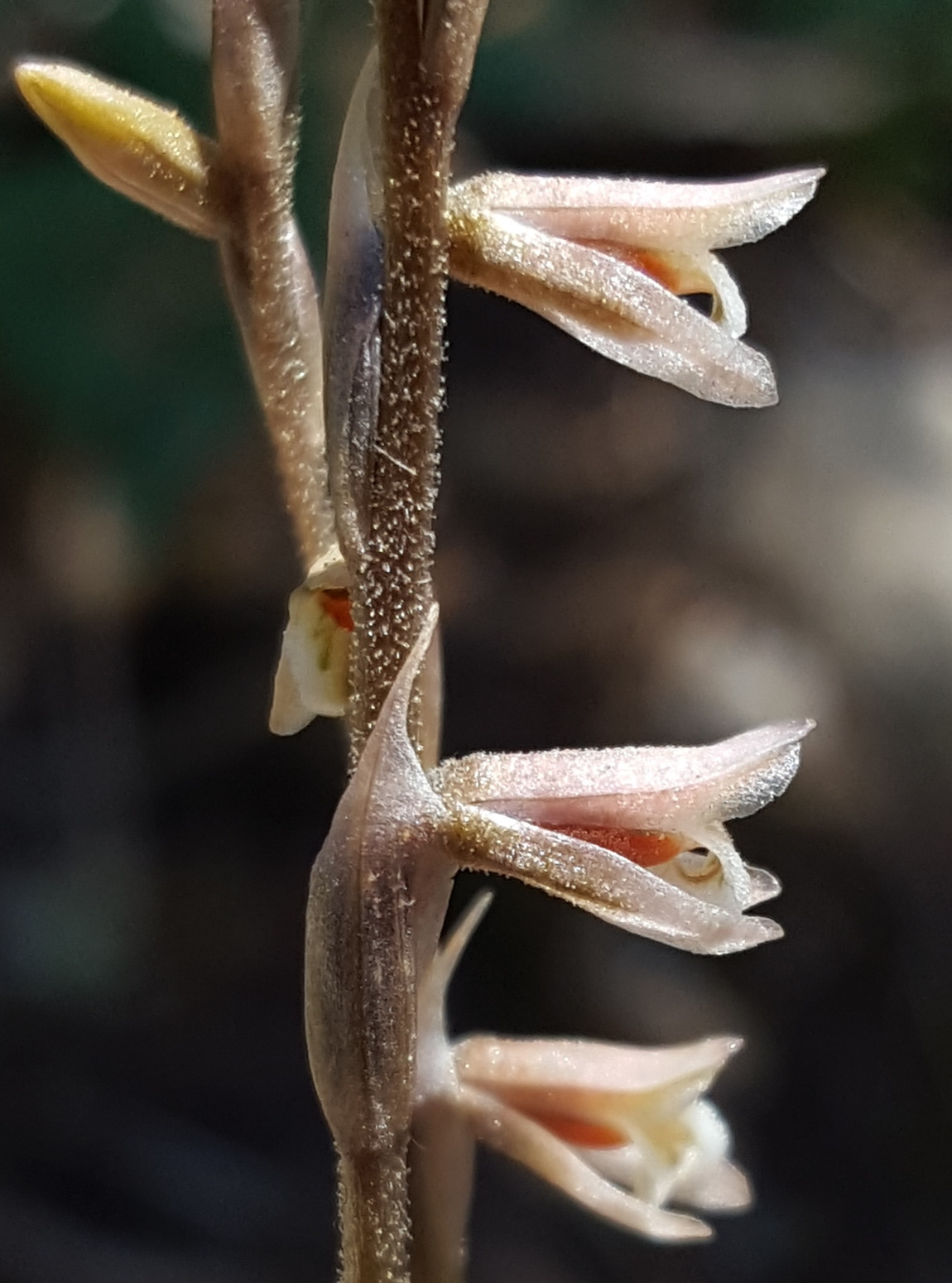

Scientific classification
- Kingdom: Plantae
- Clade: Tracheophytes
- Clade: Angiosperms
- Clade: Monocots
- Order: Asparagales
- Family: Orchidaceae
- Subfamily: Orchidoideae
- Tribe: Cranichideae
- Genus: Schiedeella
- Species: S. arizonica

Binomial name
- Schiedeella arizonica P.M.Br.

Synonyms
- Schiedeella arizonica f. virescens P.M.Br. (2006)

= Schiedeella arizonica =

Species of plant

Schiedeella arizonica is a species of orchid native to the southwestern United States. It was first described by Paul Martin Brown in 2000. This species additionally goes by several common names including fallen ladies tresses, parasitic lady's tresses, and Indian-braids.

== Description ==
Schiedeela arizonica emerges in late April and flowers from May to early July. Leaves are not present while the plant is flowering and are put up around six weeks after blooming. While flowering the plant will have several translucent white or rosy flowers these flowers are small between 10-15mm in length. Schiedeela arizonica has three to five leaves at its base. The leaves are deep green and the stem is greenish yellow to somewhat pink. The plant can grow up to about one foot tall.

== Taxonomy ==
Schiedeella arizonica was originally identified as Spiranthes parasitica in the Southwestern United States before eventually being split off into Schiedeela parasitica. In 2000 Paul Martin Brown described the species as Schiedeela arizonica.

== Distribution ==
In the United States Schiedeella arizonica can be found in southeastern Arizona, southern New Mexico, and the western part of Texas. However, much is unknown about its distribution in northern New Mexico. There are zero collections of this species in Mexico on the Global Biodiversity Information Facility.

== Habitat and ecology ==
Schiedeela arizonica is primarily found in dry mixed coniferous and deciduous forests as well as mixed oak woodlands. It can also be found in creek canyons and hillsides. It occurs at elevations between 1500 and 4600 meters. This species usually grows in heavy forest duff however, in some habitats it has been observed among rocks or bare soils. It has also been observed growing on the edges of meadows.

== Fungal associations ==
While the genus Schiedeella has not yet been studied with regard to its specific fungal partners, studies on similar genera in the subtribe Spiranthinae indicate that it may be able to associate with a wide array of fungi. For example Spiranthes spiralis was found to associate with nine different types of fungi across six different genera including Rhizoctonia and Ceratobasidium.

== Conservation status ==
In New Mexico Schiedeela arizonica has a NatureServe ranking of S3 which denotes a vulnerable species in the state. The species has traditionally been considered to be quite rare in the United States. However several orchid experts have recently challenged that notion stating that the plant is actually very common but extremely difficult to survey. This is due to its camouflaging color scheme and the fact that only about 10–15% of plants bloom each year.
