= Garaya =

Garaya may refer to:

- Garaya, genus name, alternative scientific name of the Mesadenella orchid
- Garaya (lute) a Hausa musical instrument in the lute family
