= Kionophyton =

Scientific classification
- Kingdom: Plantae
- Clade: Tracheophytes
- Clade: Angiosperms
- Clade: Monocots
- Order: Asparagales
- Family: Orchidaceae
- Subfamily: Orchidoideae
- Tribe: Cranichideae
- Subtribe: Spiranthinae
- Genus: Kionophyton; Garay

Synonyms
- Greenwoodia Burns-Bal.

Genus of orchids

Kionophyton is a genus of flowering plants from the orchid family, Orchidaceae. It contains 3 known species, native to Mexico and Guatemala.

- Kionophyton pollardianum Szlach., Rutk. & Mytnik - Oaxaca
- Kionophyton sawyeri (Standl. & L.O.Williams) Garay - Morelos
- Kionophyton seminuda (Schltr.) Garay - widespread from central Mexico to Guatemala

== See also ==
- List of Orchidaceae genera
