= Svenkoeltzia =

Scientific classification
- Kingdom: Plantae
- Clade: Tracheophytes
- Clade: Angiosperms
- Clade: Monocots
- Order: Asparagales
- Family: Orchidaceae
- Subfamily: Orchidoideae
- Tribe: Cranichideae
- Subtribe: Spiranthinae
- Genus: Svenkoeltzia; Burns-Bal.

Type species
- Svenkoeltzia congestiflora (L.O.Williams) Burns-Bal.

Genus of flowering plants

Svenkoeltzia is a genus of flowering plants from the orchid family, Orchidaceae. It contains three known species, all endemic to Mexico.

1. Svenkoeltzia congestiflora (L.O.Williams) Burns-Bal. - Oaxaca
2. Svenkoeltzia luzmariana R.González - Jalisco
3. Svenkoeltzia patriciae R.González - Jalisco

A fourth species, Svenkoeltzia pamelae Szlach., Rutk. & Mytnik, was described from Oaxaca in 2004, but the name is considered not validly published because the authors did not specify the herbarium in which the type specimen is located. The Kew World Checklist and the Plant List list the name as a synonym of S. congestiflora.

== See also ==
- List of Orchidaceae genera
