= Sotoa =

Scientific classification
- Kingdom: Plantae
- Clade: Tracheophytes
- Clade: Angiosperms
- Clade: Monocots
- Order: Asparagales
- Family: Orchidaceae
- Subfamily: Orchidoideae
- Tribe: Cranichideae
- Subtribe: Spiranthinae
- Genus: Sotoa; Salazar
- Species: S. confusa

Binomial name
- Sotoa confusa (Garay) Salazar

Synonyms
- Deiregyne confusa Garay; Funkiella durangensis subsp. confusa (Garay) Szlach.; Spiranthes confusa (Garay) Kartesz & Gandhi; Schiedeella confusa (Garay) Espejo & López-Ferr.; Funkiella confusa (Garay) Szlach.

Genus of orchids

Sotoa is a genus of orchid, a relatively new genus described in 2010. It is native to western Texas and to Mexico as far south as Oaxaca. Only one species is known, Sotoa confusa.

Sotoa confusa is very rare in Texas. It was collected in 1931 in the Chisos Mountains inside Big Bend National Park, the specimens at the time misidentified as Spiranthes durangensis (now a synonym of Schiedeella saltensis). The material was not recognized as a distinct taxon until years later. It was not until 2008 that a live population was discovered.

== See also ==
- List of Orchidaceae genera
