= Cybebus =

Scientific classification
- Kingdom: Plantae
- Clade: Tracheophytes
- Clade: Angiosperms
- Clade: Monocots
- Order: Asparagales
- Family: Orchidaceae
- Subfamily: Orchidoideae
- Tribe: Cranichideae
- Subtribe: Spiranthinae
- Genus: Cybebus; Garay
- Species: C. grandis

Binomial name
- Cybebus grandis Garay

Genus of orchids

Cybebus is a genus of flowering plants from the orchid family, Orchidaceae. It contains only one known species, Cybebus grandis, native to Colombia and Ecuador

== See also ==
- List of Orchidaceae genera
