= Buchtienia =

Scientific classification
- Kingdom: Plantae
- Clade: Tracheophytes
- Clade: Angiosperms
- Clade: Monocots
- Order: Asparagales
- Family: Orchidaceae
- Subfamily: Orchidoideae
- Tribe: Cranichideae
- Subtribe: Spiranthinae
- Genus: Buchtienia; Schltr.

Genus of flowering plants

Buchtienia is a genus of flowering plants from the orchid family, Orchidaceae. It contains 3 species, all native to South America:

- Buchtienia boliviensis Schltr.
- Buchtienia ecuadorensis Garay
- Buchtienia rosea Garay

== See also ==
- List of Orchidaceae genera
