= Brachystele tamayoana =

Scientific classification
- Kingdom: Plantae
- Clade: Tracheophytes
- Clade: Angiosperms
- Clade: Monocots
- Order: Asparagales
- Family: Orchidaceae
- Subfamily: Orchidoideae
- Tribe: Cranichideae
- Genus: Brachystele
- Species: B. tamayoana

Binomial name
- Brachystele tamayoana Szlach., Rutk. & Mytnik

Species of orchid

Brachystele tamayoana is a species of orchid native to the States of Guanajuato and Baja California Sur in Mexico.

There is some confusion concerning the geographic region in which the plant is located. The peninsula of Baja California is over 1200 km long, and politically divided into two states, "Baja California" and "Baja California Sur." There is no Baja California Norte. Brachystele tamayoana was described in 2004 by Polish botanists examining specimens from US and UK herbaria. The specimen designated type was collected in 1959, the label giving the location as "in the Cape Region of Baja California." The term "Cape Region" is very often used by US authors to mean the area near Cabo San Lucas in Baja California Sur. Some secondary sources (e.g. Tropicos and Kew's World Checklist), however, list "Baja California" as the location, erroneously implying the northern part of the peninsula.
