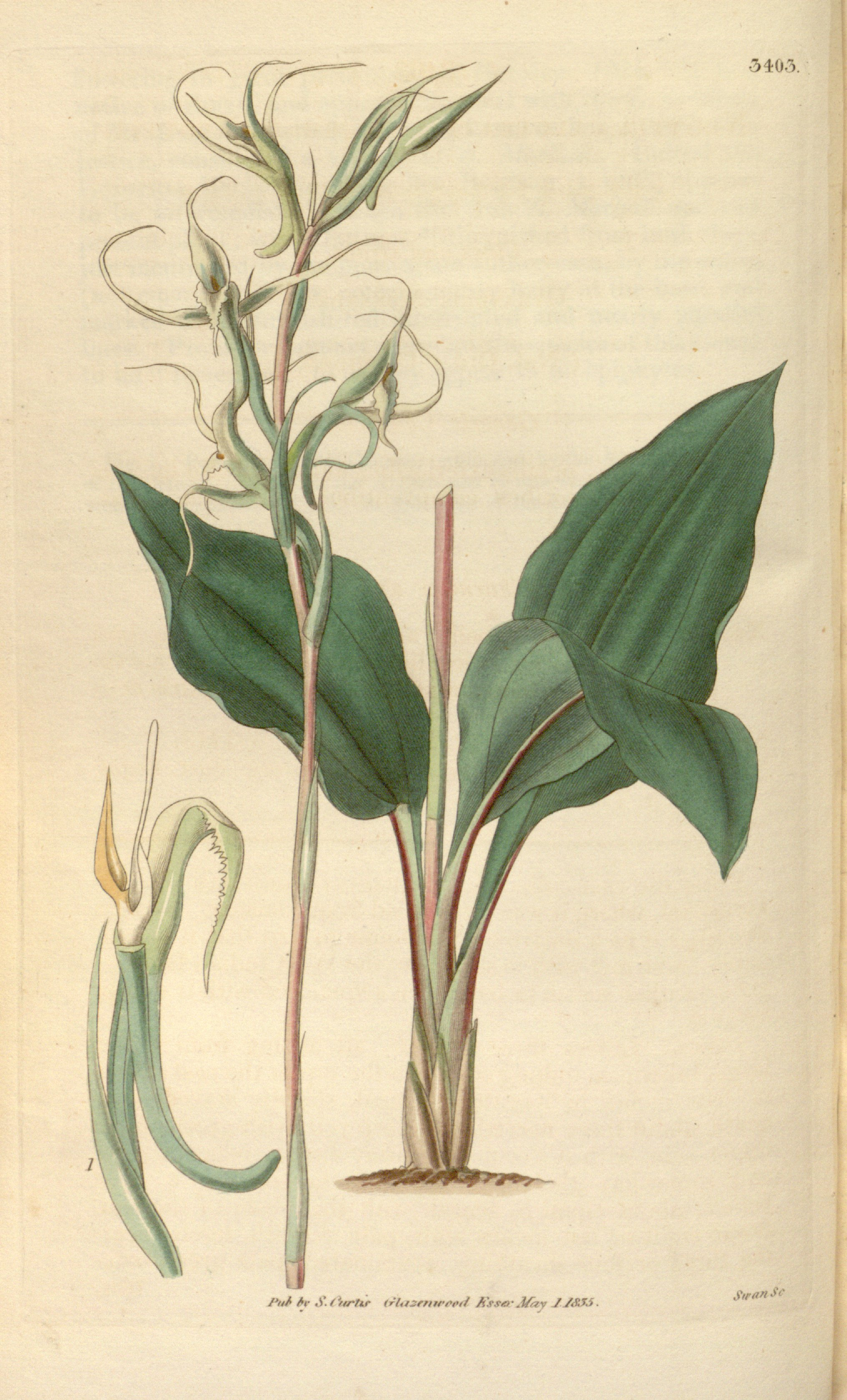
- 1835 illustration

Conservation status
- Apparently Secure (NatureServe)

Scientific classification
- Kingdom: Plantae
- Clade: Tracheophytes
- Clade: Angiosperms
- Clade: Monocots
- Order: Asparagales
- Family: Orchidaceae
- Subfamily: Orchidoideae
- Tribe: Cranichideae
- Genus: Eltroplectris
- Species: E. calcarata

Binomial name
- Eltroplectris calcarata (Sw.) Garay & H.R.Sweet

Synonyms
- Neottia calcarata Sw.; Stenorrhynchos calcaratum (Sw.) Rich.; Collea calcarata (Sw.) Lindl.; Pelexia calcarata (Sw.) Cogn. in I.Urban; Centrogenium calcaratum (Sw.) Schltr.; Spiranthes calcarata (Sw.) Jiménez; Eltroplectris acuminata Raf.; Pelexia domingensis Lindl.; Pelexia setacea Lindl.; Pelexia setacea var. glabra Cogn.; Centrogenium setaceum (Lindl.) Schltr.; Centrogenium rademarkeri Ruschi & la Gasa

= Eltroplectris calcarata =

Longclaw orchid

Species of orchid

Eltroplectris calcarata, the longclaw orchid, is a terrestrial species of orchid. It is native to Florida, Bahamas, Cayman Islands, Cuba, Hispaniola, Jamaica, Puerto Rico, Windward Islands, Trinidad, Suriname, Venezuela, Colombia, Peru, Brazil, and Paraguay.
