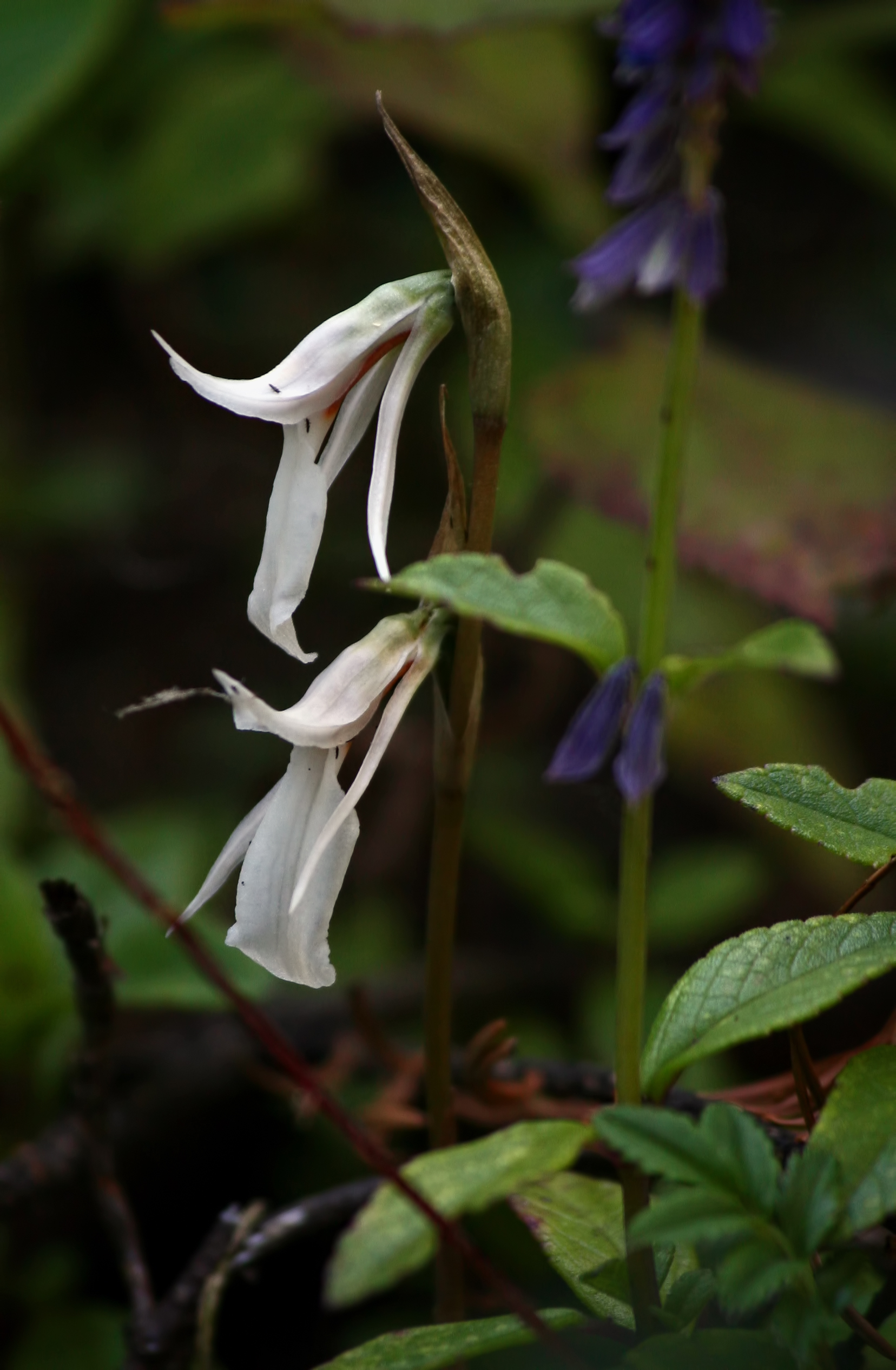
- Funkiella hyemalis

Scientific classification
- Kingdom: Plantae
- Clade: Tracheophytes
- Clade: Angiosperms
- Clade: Monocots
- Order: Asparagales
- Family: Orchidaceae
- Subfamily: Orchidoideae
- Tribe: Cranichideae
- Subtribe: Spiranthinae
- Genus: Funkiella; Schltr.

= Funkiella =

Genus of orchids

Funkiella is a genus of flowering plants from the orchid family, Orchidaceae native to Mexico and Central America.

- Funkiella hyemalis (A.Rich. & Galeotti) Schltr - from central Mexico to Guatemala
- Funkiella laxispica (Catling) Salazar & Soto Arenas - Oaxaca
- Funkiella parasitica (A.Rich. & Galeotti) Salazar & Soto Arenas - from central Mexico to Costa Rica
- Funkiella stolonifera (Ames & Correll) Garay - Chiapas, Guatemala
- Funkiella tenella (L.O.Williams) Szlach. - Chihuahua, Durango
- Funkiella valerioi (Ames & C.Schweinf.) Salazar & Soto Arenas - Costa Rica, Guatemala
- Funkiella versiformis Szlach. - Costa Rica

== See also ==
- List of Orchidaceae genera
