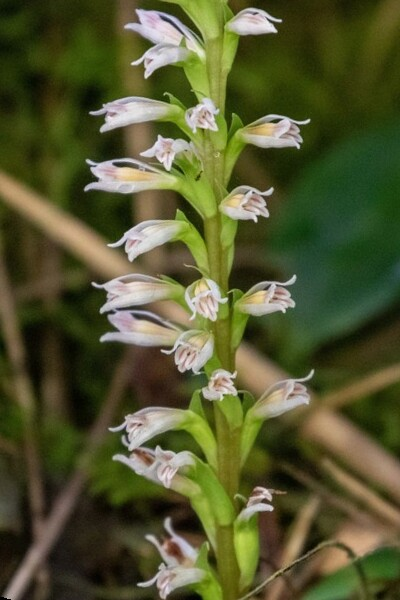

Scientific classification
- Kingdom: Plantae
- Clade: Tracheophytes
- Clade: Angiosperms
- Clade: Monocots
- Order: Asparagales
- Family: Orchidaceae
- Subfamily: Orchidoideae
- Tribe: Cranichideae
- Subtribe: Spiranthinae
- Genus: Quechua; Salazar & L.Jost
- Species: Q. glabrescens

Binomial name
- Quechua glabrescens (T.Hashim.) Salazar & L.Jost

Synonyms
- Beadlea glabrescens (T.Hashim.) Garay; Cyclopogon glabrescens (T.Hashim.) Dodson, Brako & Zarucchi (1993); Spiranthes glabrescens T.Hashim.

= Quechua glabrescens =

Species of orchid

Quechua glabrescens is a species of flowering plant in the family Orchidaceae, native to Peru and Ecuador. It was first discovered in Peru and described by botanist T. Hashimoto in 1971 as Spiranthes glabrescens . Following its rediscovery in the Rio Anzu Reserve in the Amazonian foothills near Mera, Ecuador, molecular phylogenetic analyses revealed that it did not belong within Spiranthes or Cyclopogon. As a result, in 2012, Gerardo A. Salazar and Lou Jost formally published the new monotypic genus Quechua, reclassifying the species as Quechua glabrescens. As of July 2023, it is the only species in the genus Quechua.
