= Aracamunia =

Scientific classification
- Kingdom: Plantae
- Clade: Tracheophytes
- Clade: Angiosperms
- Clade: Monocots
- Order: Asparagales
- Family: Orchidaceae
- Subfamily: Orchidoideae
- Tribe: Cranichideae
- Subtribe: Spiranthinae
- Genus: Aracamunia; Carnevali & I.Ramírez
- Species: A. liesneri

Binomial name
- Aracamunia liesneri Carnevali & I. Ramírez

Genus of flowering plants

Aracamunia liesneri, collected by R. Liesner and F. Delascia in 1987, is the sole species in the orchid genus Aracamunia. It is the only orchid strongly suspected of being carnivorous. A. liesneri bears peculiar, rigid, tongue-like structures with apparently sticky tips emanating from the bases of its leaves.

It was found on Cerro Aracamuni in Venezuela, an area with nutrition-poor soil that apparently favors the emergence of assimilative (carnivorous) species.
