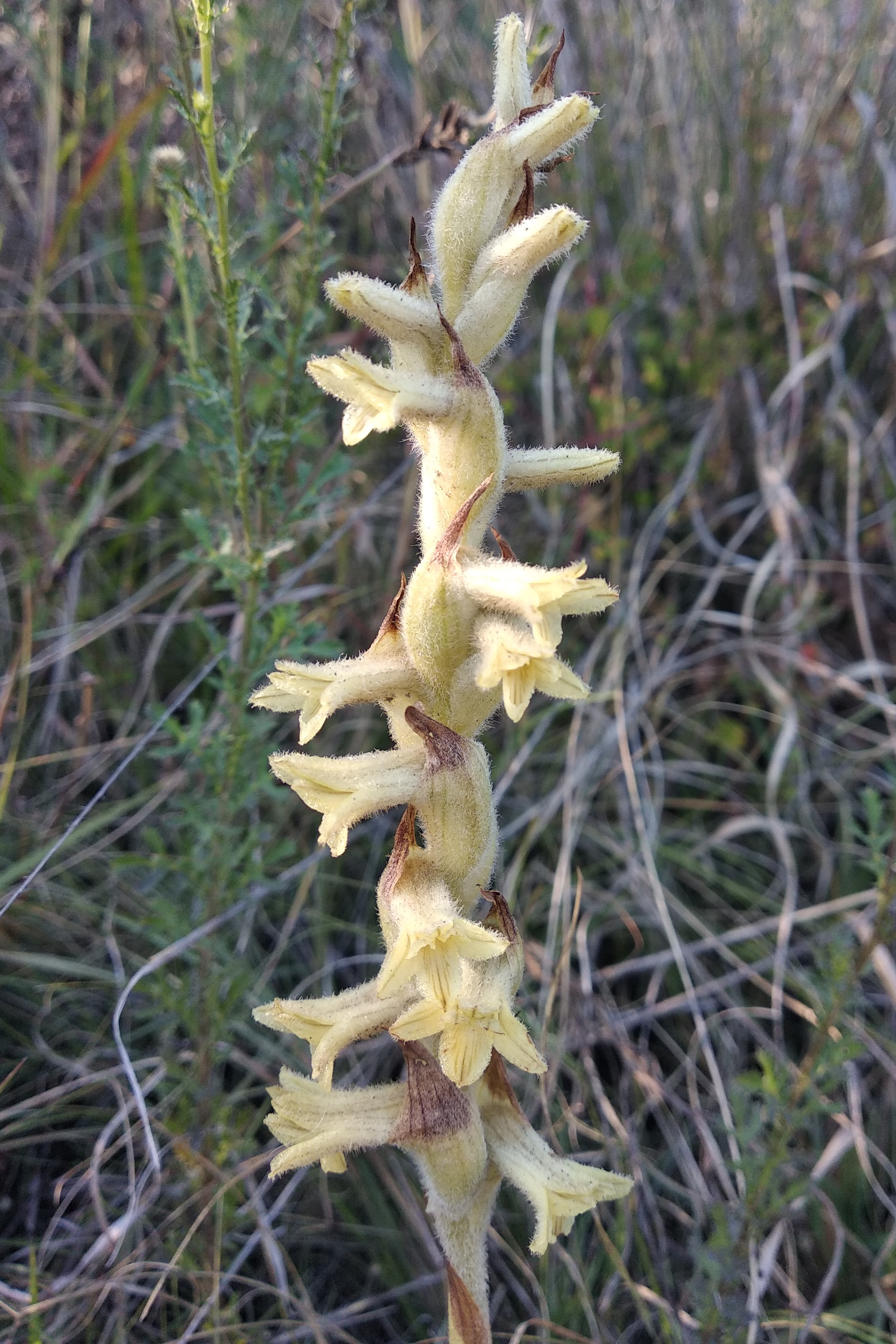

Scientific classification
- Kingdom: Plantae
- Clade: Tracheophytes
- Clade: Angiosperms
- Clade: Monocots
- Order: Asparagales
- Family: Orchidaceae
- Subfamily: Orchidoideae
- Tribe: Cranichideae
- Genus: Dichromanthus
- Species: D. michuacanus

Binomial name
- Dichromanthus michuacanus (Lex.) Salazar & Soto Arenas

Synonyms
- Neottia michuacana Lex. in P.de La Llave & J.M.de Lexarza; Stenorrhynchos michuacanum (Lex.) Lindl.; Spiranthes michuacana (Lex.) Hemsl.; Gyrostachys michuacana (Lex.) Kuntze; Schiedeella michuacana (Lex.) Burns-Bal.; Neottia sulphurea Lex. in P.de La Llave & J.M.de Lexarza; Stenorrhynchos sulphureum (Lex.) Lindl.; Stenorrhynchos madrense Rchb.f.; Spiranthes madrensis (Rchb.f.) Hemsl.; Spiranthes sulphurea (Lex.) Hemsl.; Gyrostachys madrensis (Rchb.f.) Kuntze; Gyrostachys sulphurea (Lex.) Kuntze; Spiranthes bracteolaris Kraenzl.; Stenorrhynchos michuacanum subsp. vexillaris Szlach.; Stenorrhynchos vexillare (Szlach.) Szlach., Rutk. & Mytnik; Dichromanthus michuacanus f. armeniacus R.A.Coleman

= Dichromanthus michuacanus =

Michoacán lady orchid

Species of orchid

Dichromanthus michuacanus, the Michoacán lady orchid, is a terrestrial species of orchid. It is common across much of Mexico, the range extending south to Honduras and north into western Texas and southern Arizona.
