= Nothostele =

Scientific classification
- Kingdom: Plantae
- Clade: Tracheophytes
- Clade: Angiosperms
- Clade: Monocots
- Order: Asparagales
- Family: Orchidaceae
- Subfamily: Orchidoideae
- Tribe: Cranichideae
- Subtribe: Spiranthinae
- Genus: Nothostele; Garay

Genus of orchids

Nothostele is a genus of flowering plants from the orchid family, Orchidaceae. It contains two known species, both endemic to Brazil.

- Nothostele acianthiformis (Rchb.f. & Warm.) Garay - Minas Gerais
- Nothostele brasiliaensis J.A.N.Bat., Meneguzzo & Bianch - Distrito Federal and Goiás

== See also ==
- List of Orchidaceae genera
