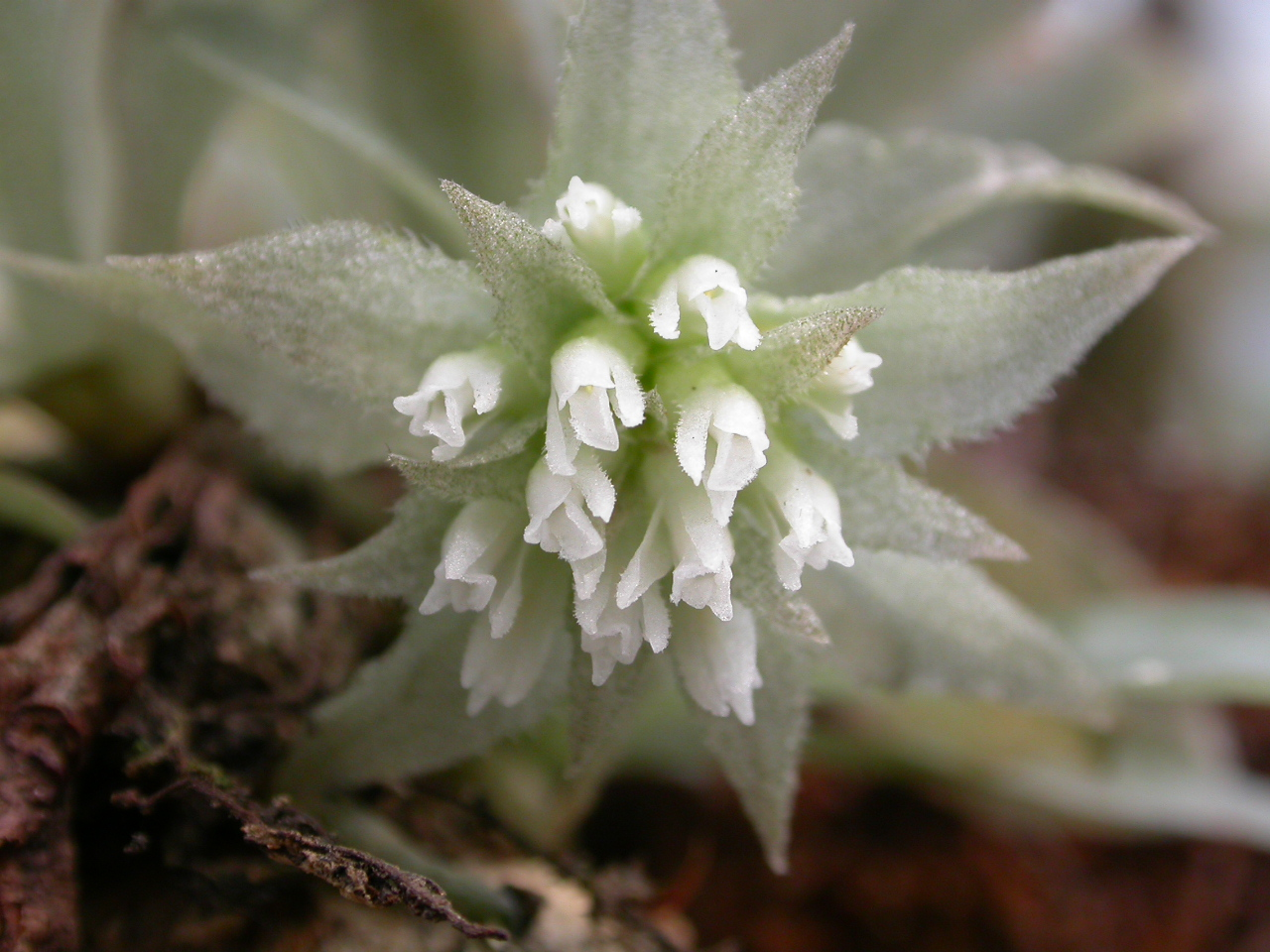
- Eurystyles cotyledon (type species)

Scientific classification
- Kingdom: Plantae
- Clade: Tracheophytes
- Clade: Angiosperms
- Clade: Monocots
- Order: Asparagales
- Family: Orchidaceae
- Subfamily: Orchidoideae
- Tribe: Cranichideae
- Subtribe: Spiranthinae
- Genus: Eurystyles; Wawra

Synonyms
- Trachelosiphon Schltr.; Pseudoeurystyles Hoehne; Synanthes Burns-Bal., H.Rob. & Merc.S.Foster

= Eurystyles =

Custard orchids

Genus of orchids

Eurystyles is a genus of flowering plants from the orchid family, Orchidaceae, native to South America, Central America, the West Indies and Chiapas.

As of December 2025, Plants of the World Online accepts the following 23 species:

- Eurystyles actinosophila (Barb.Rodr.) Schltr.
- Eurystyles alticola Dod
- Eurystyles ananassocomos (Rchb.f.) Schltr.
- Eurystyles auriculata Schltr.
- Eurystyles barrerorum Szlach. & Kolan.
- Eurystyles christensonii D.E.Benn.
- Eurystyles cogniauxii (Kraenzl.) Schltr.
- Eurystyles colombiana (Schltr.) Schltr.
- Eurystyles cornu-bovis Szlach.
- Eurystyles cotyledon Wawra
- Eurystyles crocodilus Szlach.
- Eurystyles domingensis Dod
- Eurystyles gardneri (Lindl.) Garay
- Eurystyles guentheriana (Kraenzl.) Garay
- Eurystyles hoehnei Szlach.
- Eurystyles lobata Chiron & V.P.Castro
- Eurystyles lorenzii (Cogn.) Schltr.
- Eurystyles luisortizii Ackerman
- Eurystyles ochyrana (Szlach., Mytnik & Rutk.) F.Barros & L.R.S.Guim.
- Eurystyles rutkowskiana Szlach.
- Eurystyles splendissima Szlach.
- Eurystyles standleyi Ames
- Eurystyles uxoris Bogarín

== See also ==
- List of Orchidaceae genera
