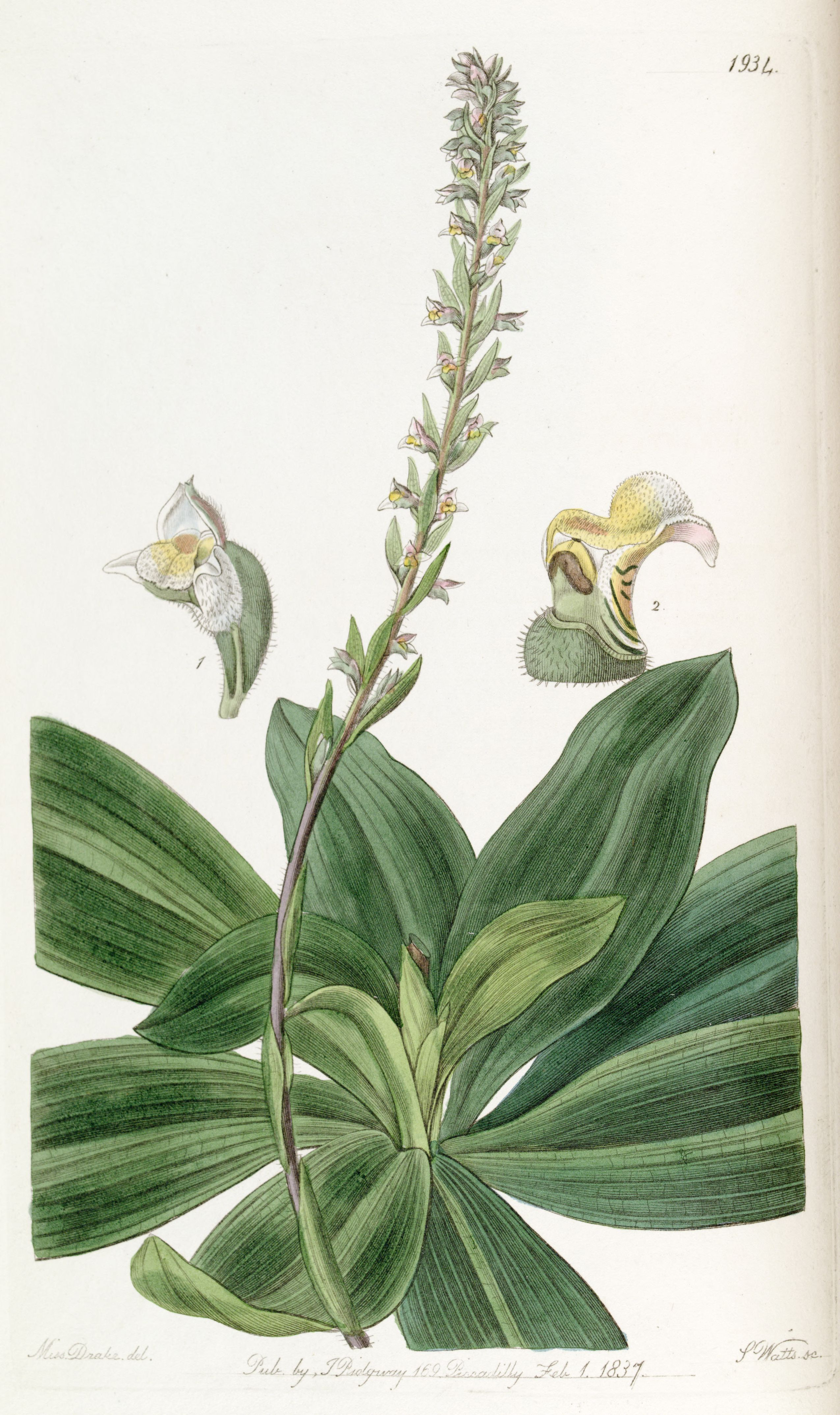
- Brachystele bracteosa 1837 illustration Edwards's Botanical Register

Scientific classification
- Kingdom: Plantae
- Clade: Tracheophytes
- Clade: Angiosperms
- Clade: Monocots
- Order: Asparagales
- Family: Orchidaceae
- Subfamily: Orchidoideae
- Tribe: Cranichideae
- Subtribe: Spiranthinae
- Genus: Brachystele; Schltr.

Synonyms
- Diskyphogyne Szlach. & R.González

= Brachystele =

Genus of flowering plants

Brachystele is a genus of flowering plants from the orchid family, Orchidaceae. It consists of 20 species native primarily to South America but with a few species in Mexico, Central America, and Trinidad and Tobago.

- Brachystele arechavaletae (Kraenzl.) Schltr.
- Brachystele bicrinita Szlach.
- Brachystele bracteosa (Lindl.) Schltr.
- Brachystele burkartii M.N.Correa
- Brachystele camporum (Lindl.) Schltr.
- Brachystele chlorops (Rchb.f.) Schltr.
- Brachystele cyclochila (Kraenzl.) Schltr.
- Brachystele delicatula (Kraenzl.) Schltr.
- Brachystele dilatata (Lindl.) Schltr.
- Brachystele guayanensis (Lindl.) Schltr.
- Brachystele luzmariana Szlach. & R.González
- Brachystele maasii Szlach.
- Brachystele oxyanthos Szlach
- Brachystele pappulosa Szlach
- Brachystele scabrilingua Szlach
- Brachystele subfiliformis (Cogn.) Schltr
- Brachystele tamayoana Szlach.
- Brachystele unilateralis (Poir.) Schltr
- Brachystele waldemarii Szlach.
- Brachystele widgrenii (Rchb.f.) Schltr.

== See also ==
- List of Orchidaceae genera
