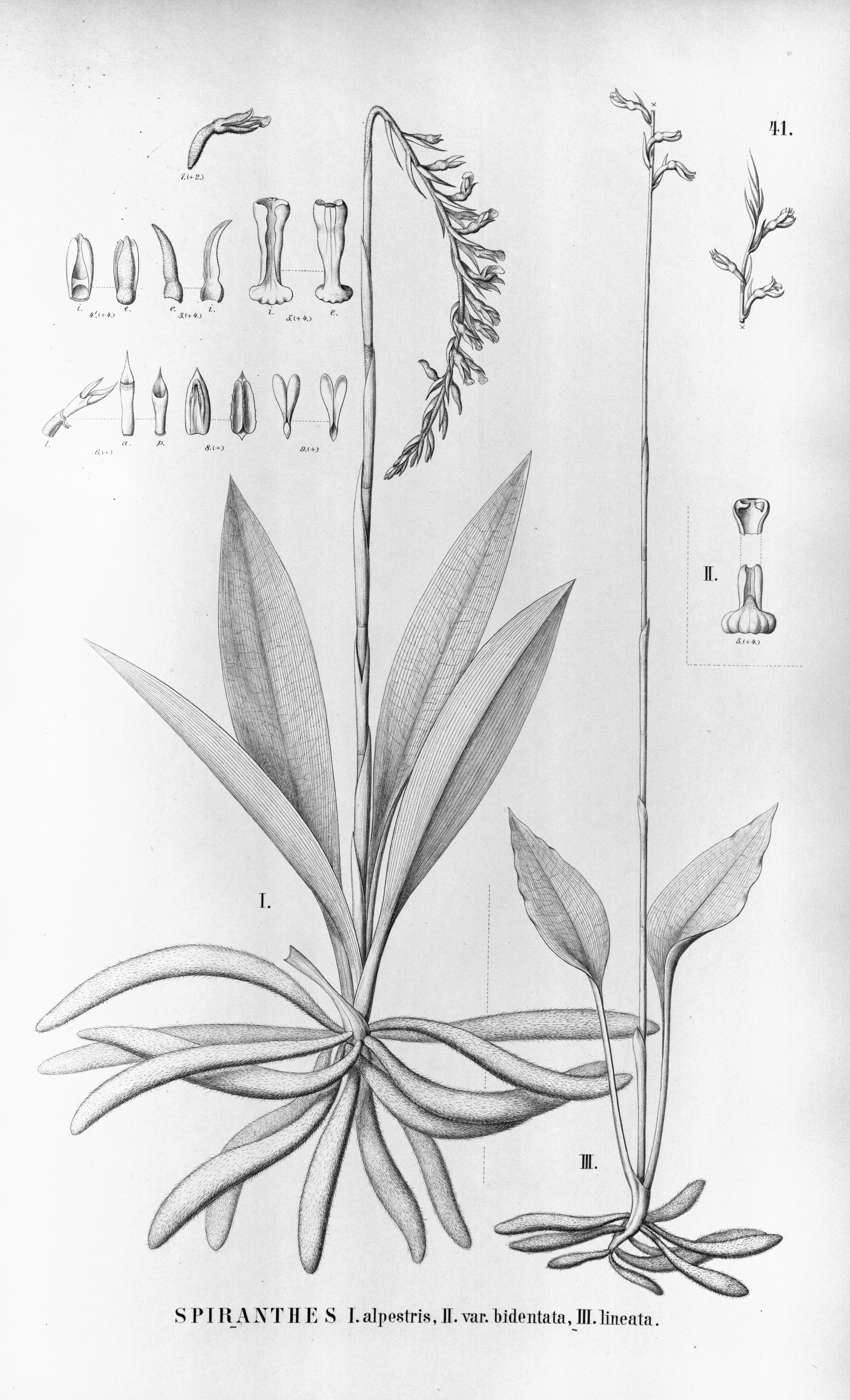
- Hapalorchis lineata (fig III at the right); 1895 illustration

Scientific classification
- Kingdom: Plantae
- Clade: Tracheophytes
- Clade: Angiosperms
- Clade: Monocots
- Order: Asparagales
- Family: Orchidaceae
- Subfamily: Orchidoideae
- Tribe: Cranichideae
- Subtribe: Spiranthinae
- Genus: Hapalorchis; Schltr.

= Hapalorchis =

Genus of orchids

Hapalorchis is a genus of flowering plants from the orchid family, Orchidaceae, native to Central America, South America, and the West Indies.

- Hapalorchis cymbirostris Szlach. - Rio de Janeiro
- Hapalorchis lindleyana Garay - Rio de Janeiro
- Hapalorchis lineata (Lindl.) Schltr. - widespread from Guatemala east to Puerto Rico and south to Brazil
- Hapalorchis longirostris Schltr. - Colombia
- Hapalorchis neglecta Szlach. & Rutk. - Ecuador
- Hapalorchis pandurata Szlach. - Rio de Janeiro
- Hapalorchis piesikii Szlach. & Rutk. - Colombia
- Hapalorchis pumila (C.Schweinf.) Garay - Costa Rica, Ecuador, Peru
- Hapalorchis stellaris Szlach. - Rio Grande do Sul
- Hapalorchis trilobata Schltr. - Colombia

== See also ==
- List of Orchidaceae genera
