= Cotylolabium =

Scientific classification
- Kingdom: Plantae
- Clade: Tracheophytes
- Clade: Angiosperms
- Clade: Monocots
- Order: Asparagales
- Family: Orchidaceae
- Subfamily: Orchidoideae
- Tribe: Cranichideae
- Subtribe: Spiranthinae
- Genus: Cotylolabium; Garay
- Species: C. lutzii

Binomial name
- Cotylolabium lutzii (Pabst) Garay

Synonyms
- Stenorrhynchos lutzii Pabst; Spiranthes lutzii (Pabst) H.G.Jones

Genus of orchids

Cotylolabium is a genus of flowering plants from the orchid family, Orchidaceae. It contains only one known species, Cotylolabium lutzii, endemic to Brazil.

== See also ==
- List of Orchidaceae genera
