= Dichromanthus yucundaa =

Scientific classification
- Kingdom: Plantae
- Clade: Tracheophytes
- Clade: Angiosperms
- Clade: Monocots
- Order: Asparagales
- Family: Orchidaceae
- Subfamily: Orchidoideae
- Tribe: Cranichideae
- Genus: Dichromanthus
- Species: D. yucundaa

Binomial name
- Dichromanthus yucundaa Salazar & García-Mend.

Species of orchid

Dichromanthus yucundaa is a terrestrial species of orchid. It is endemic to the State of Oaxaca in southern Mexico.
