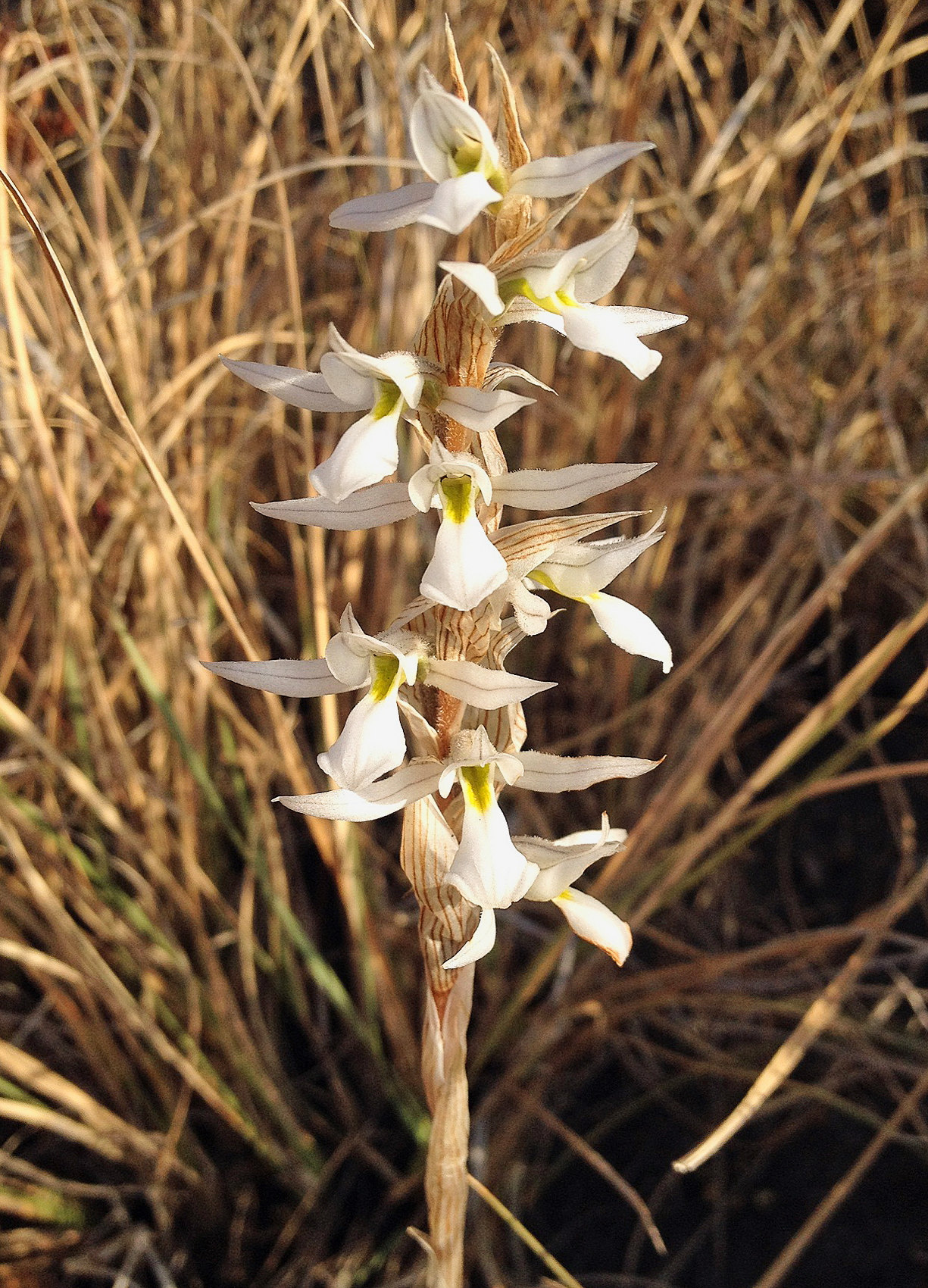
- Deiregyne eriophora

Scientific classification
- Kingdom: Plantae
- Clade: Embryophytes
- Clade: Tracheophytes
- Clade: Spermatophytes
- Clade: Angiosperms
- Clade: Monocots
- Order: Asparagales
- Family: Orchidaceae
- Subfamily: Orchidoideae
- Tribe: Cranichideae
- Subtribe: Spiranthinae
- Genus: Deiregyne; Schltr.

Synonyms
- Dithyridanthus Garay; Burnsbaloghia Szlach.; Oestlundorchis Szlach.; Triceratostris (Szlach.) Szlach. & R.González

= Deiregyne =

Genus of orchids

Deiregyne is a genus of flowering plants from the orchid family, Orchidaceae, native to Mexico, Guatemala and Honduras.

== Taxonomy ==
The genus Deiregyne was described in 1920 by Rudolf Schlechter in Beihefte zum Botanischen Centralblatt. 37: 426.

=== Etymology ===
Deiregyne: generic name Greek formed from deire, "neck"; and gyne, «pistil» or «woman»; in reference to the sepal sitting on the ovary that forms a neck-like extension.

== Species ==
Species currently accepted as of July 2026:

- Deiregyne alinae Szlach. - Michoacán
- Deiregyne callifera Salazar & Hern.-Cardona
- Deiregyne chartacea (L.O.Williams) Garay - central Mexico
- Deiregyne cochleata Szlach., R.González & Rutk. - Tamaulipas
- Deiregyne densiflora (C.Schweinf.) Salazar & Soto Arenas - central Mexico south to Oaxaca
- Deiregyne diaphana (Lindl.) Garay - Oaxaca
- Deiregyne eriophora (B.L.Rob. & Greenm.) Garay - central Mexico south to Guatemala
- Deiregyne falcata (L.O.Williams) Garay - Mexico and Honduras
- Deiregyne flavoferruginea (Szlach.) J.M.H.Shaw
- Deiregyne hagsateri (Szlach.) J.M.H.Shaw
- Deiregyne hio (Szlach.) J.M.H.Shaw
- Deiregyne nonantzin (R.González ex McVaugh) Catling - Jalisco
- Deiregyne obtecta (C.Schweinf.) Garay - Guatemala
- Deiregyne pallens (Szlach.) Espejo & López-Ferr. - Guerrero, Oaxaca
- Deiregyne pseudopyramidalis (L.O.Williams) Garay - Oaxaca
- Deiregyne pterygodium Szlach. - México State
- Deiregyne ramirezii R.González - Jalisco
- Deiregyne rhombilabia Garay - Michoacán, Morelos, Oaxaca, Puebla
- Deiregyne sheviakiana (Szlach.) Espejo & López-Ferr. - Chiapas
- Deiregyne tamayoi Szlach. - Jalisco
- Deiregyne tenorioi Soto Arenas & Salazar
- Deiregyne thelyrnitra (Rchb.f.) Schltr. - Guatemala
- Deiregyne velata (B.L.Rob. & Fernald) Garay - Chihuahua, Durango
- Deiregyne velutina (Szlach.) J.M.H.Shaw
- Deiregyne xochitliae (R.González & Lizb.Hern.) R.Kr.Singh & Sanjeet Kumar

== See also ==
- List of Orchidaceae genera
