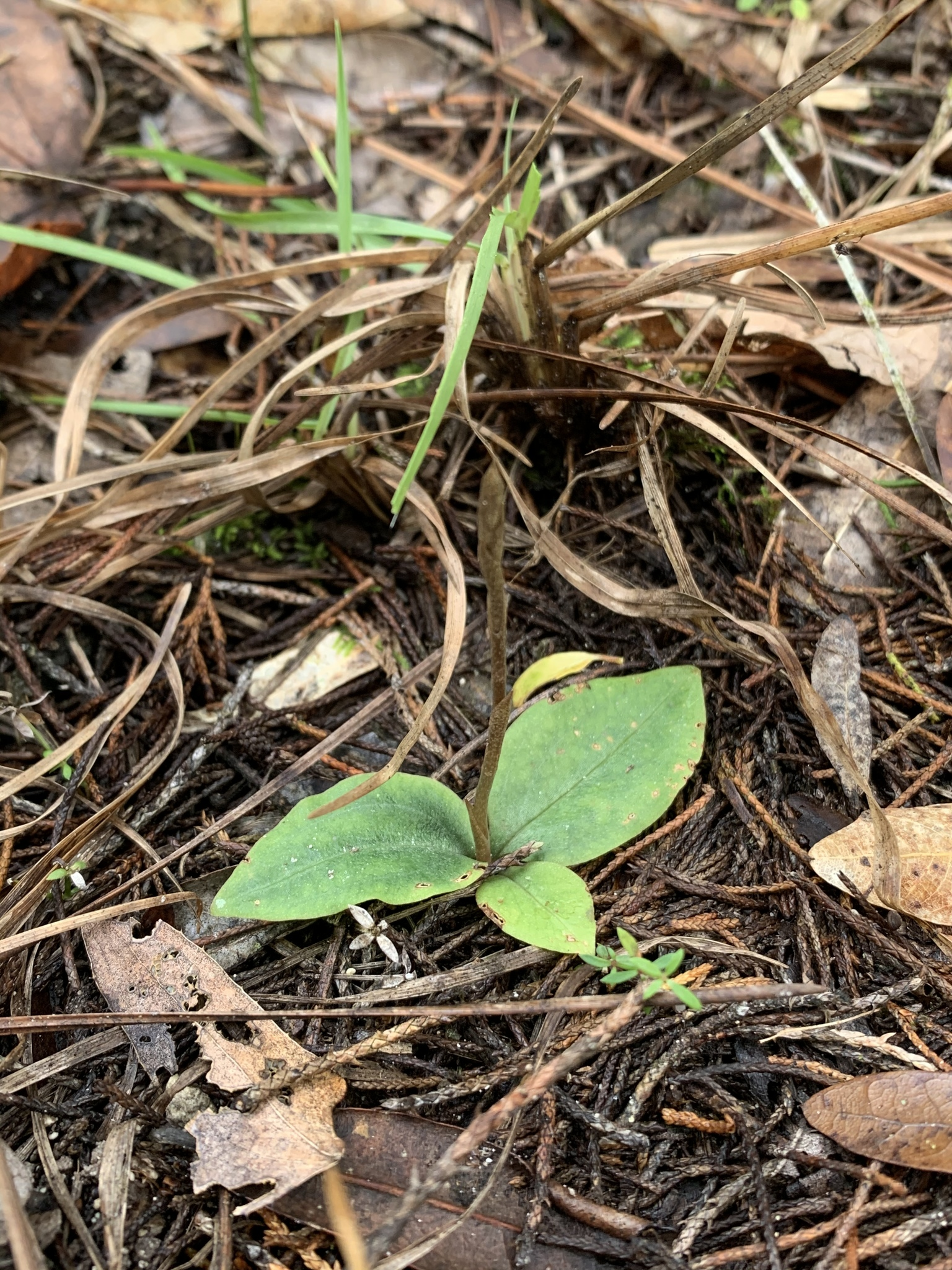
- Mesadenus lucayanus

Scientific classification
- Kingdom: Plantae
- Clade: Tracheophytes
- Clade: Angiosperms
- Clade: Monocots
- Order: Asparagales
- Family: Orchidaceae
- Subfamily: Orchidoideae
- Tribe: Cranichideae
- Subtribe: Spiranthinae
- Genus: Mesadenus; Schltr.

= Mesadenus =

Genus of orchids

Mesadenus is a genus of flowering plants from the orchid family, Orchidaceae. It contains five currently recognized species, native to Mexico, Central America, the West Indies, and Florida.

- Mesadenus chiangii (M.C.Johnst.) Garay - Coahuila
- Mesadenus lucayanus (Britton) Schltr. - widespread across Mexico, Florida, Guatemala, West Indies
- Mesadenus perezii R.González & Lizb.Hern. – western Mexico (Aguascalientes and Jalisco)
- Mesadenus polyanthus (Rchb.f.) Schltr. - Mexico, Belize
- Mesadenus tenuissimus (L.O.Williams) Garay - Morelos

A phylogenetic study published in 2019 found that the genus as then circumscribed was polyphyletic and the two Brazilian species, M. glaziovii and M. rhombiglossus, which were geographically disjunct from the other species, were also genetically distinct. They were placed in the new genus Espinhassoa as Espinhassoa glaziovii and E. rhombiglossa.

== See also ==
- List of Orchidaceae genera
