= Pseudogoodyera =

Scientific classification
- Kingdom: Plantae
- Clade: Tracheophytes
- Clade: Angiosperms
- Clade: Monocots
- Order: Asparagales
- Family: Orchidaceae
- Subfamily: Orchidoideae
- Tribe: Cranichideae
- Subtribe: Spiranthinae
- Genus: Pseudogoodyera; Schltr.
- Species: P. wrightii

Binomial name
- Pseudogoodyera wrightii (Rchb.f.) Schltr.

Synonyms
- Goodyera wrightii Rchb.f.; Spiranthes wrightii (Rchb.f.) Schltr. in I.Urban; Goodyera erythrosticta Griseb.; Spiranthes pseudogoodyerioides L.O.Williams; Pseudogoodyera pseudogoodyeroides (L.O.Williams) Szlach.

Genus of orchids

Pseudogoodyera is a genus of flowering plants from the orchid family, Orchidaceae. It contains one known species, Pseudogoodyera wrightii, native to San Luis Potosí, Cuba, Guatemala and Belize.

== See also ==
- List of Orchidaceae genera
