= Degranvillea =

Scientific classification
- Kingdom: Plantae
- Clade: Tracheophytes
- Clade: Angiosperms
- Clade: Monocots
- Order: Asparagales
- Family: Orchidaceae
- Subfamily: Orchidoideae
- Tribe: Cranichideae
- Subtribe: Spiranthinae
- Genus: Degranvillea; Determann
- Species: D. dermaptera

Binomial name
- Degranvillea dermaptera Determann

Genus of orchids

Degranvillea is a genus of flowering plants from the orchid family, Orchidaceae. At the present time, there is only one known species, Degranvillea dermaptera, endemic to French Guiana

== See also ==
- List of Orchidaceae genera
