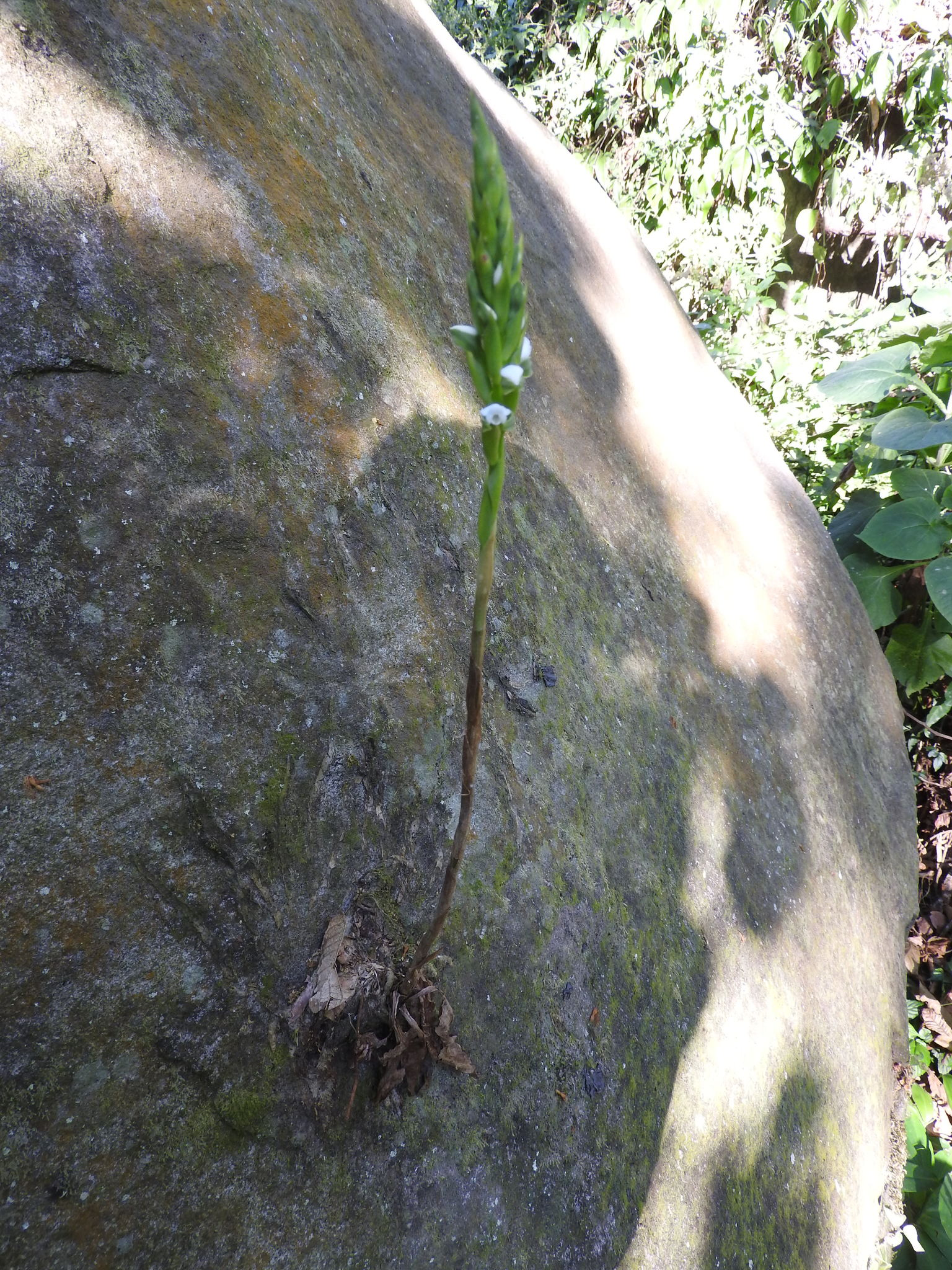
- Aulosepalum hemichrea

Scientific classification
- Kingdom: Plantae
- Clade: Tracheophytes
- Clade: Angiosperms
- Clade: Monocots
- Order: Asparagales
- Family: Orchidaceae
- Subfamily: Orchidoideae
- Tribe: Cranichideae
- Subtribe: Spiranthinae
- Genus: Aulosepalum; Garay

Type species
- Aulosepalum tenuiflorum (Greenm.) Garay

Synonyms
- Gamosepalum Schltr.; Deiregynopsis Rauschert; Gracielanthus R.González & Szlach.

= Aulosepalum =

Genus of flowering plants

Aulosepalum is a genus of flowering plants from the orchid family, Orchidaceae. It consists of 8 species native to Mexico and Central America.

- Aulosepalum hemichrea (Lindl.) Garay - Oaxaca, Chiapas, El Salvador, Guatemala, Honduras, Nicaragua
- Aulosepalum nelsonii (Greenm.) Garay - Michoacán, Oaxaca
- Aulosepalum oestlundii (Burns-Bal.) Catling - Guerrero
- Aulosepalum pulchrum (Schltr.) Catling - Guatemala and southern Mexico
- Aulosepalum pyramidale (Lindl.) M.A.Dix & M.W.Dix - from central Mexico to Costa Rica
- Aulosepalum ramentaceum (Lindl.) Garay - Tamaulipas, San Luis Potosí
- Aulosepalum riodelayense (Burns-Bal.) Salazar - Oaxaca
- Aulosepalum tenuiflorum (Greenm.) Garay - Morelos, Guerrero

== See also ==
- List of Orchidaceae genera
