= Coccineorchis =

Scientific classification
- Kingdom: Plantae
- Clade: Tracheophytes
- Clade: Angiosperms
- Clade: Monocots
- Order: Asparagales
- Family: Orchidaceae
- Subfamily: Orchidoideae
- Tribe: Cranichideae
- Subtribe: Spiranthinae
- Genus: Coccineorchis; Schltr.

Genus of orchids

Coccineorchis is a genus of flowering plants from the orchid family, Orchidaceae. It contains 7 accepted species, native to Mexico, Central America, Colombia, Ecuador and Peru.

- Coccineorchis bracteosa (Ames & C.Schweinf.) Garay - Costa Rica, Panama, Nicaragua, Ecuador
- Coccineorchis cernua (Lindl.) Garay - Mexico, Central America, Colombia, Ecuador, Peru
- Coccineorchis cristata Szlach., Rutk. & Mytnik - Panama
- Coccineorchis dressleri Szlach., Rutk. & Mytnik - Panama
- Coccineorchis navarrensis (Ames) Garay - Costa Rica, Panama, Nicaragua, Colombia
- Coccineorchis standleyi (Ames) Garay - Costa Rica, Panama, Nicaragua, Colombia, Honduras
- Coccineorchis warszewicziana Szlach. - Costa Rica

== See also ==
- List of Orchidaceae genera
