= Microthelys rubrocallosa =

Scientific classification
- Kingdom: Plantae
- Clade: Tracheophytes
- Clade: Angiosperms
- Clade: Monocots
- Order: Asparagales
- Family: Orchidaceae
- Subfamily: Orchidoideae
- Tribe: Cranichideae
- Genus: Microthelys
- Species: M. rubrocallosa

Binomial name
- Microthelys rubrocallosa (B.L.Rob. & Greenm.) Garay

Species of plant

Microthelys rubrocallosa is a species of orchid. It is a terrestrial plant with a basal rosette of up to two acuminate-tipped leaves and a slender inflorescence that bears up to 30 small, green, white-tipped flowers. The flowers are distinguished by two bright red/orange calluses on the lower part of the lip.

== Distribution and habitat ==
This species is native to mountainous regions of Mexico and has a very limited distribution in the United States. In Mexico, its range includes the states of Chihuahua, Coahuila, Puebla, and Veracruz. In the United States, it is known from only one county, Otero County in New Mexico, where it was first documented in the Sacramento Mountains in 2004 by botanists Marc Baker and Ron Coleman. The plant typically grows in mesic, mixed conifer forests at high elevations. Monitoring this species is difficult because the plants are very small and may appear above ground only as leaves, as short-lived flower stalks, or not at all in dry years. As a terrestrial orchid, it is a geophyte, with a significant underground storage organ that allows it to persist through unfavorable conditions. The New Mexico population is considered highly state rare due to the small number of plants.

== Conservation ==
The conservation status of Microthelys rubrocallosa is not well-documented globally, but its single population in the United States is considered imperiled. The small number of known individuals makes the New Mexico population particularly vulnerable to environmental threats such as wildfires and habitat disturbance.
