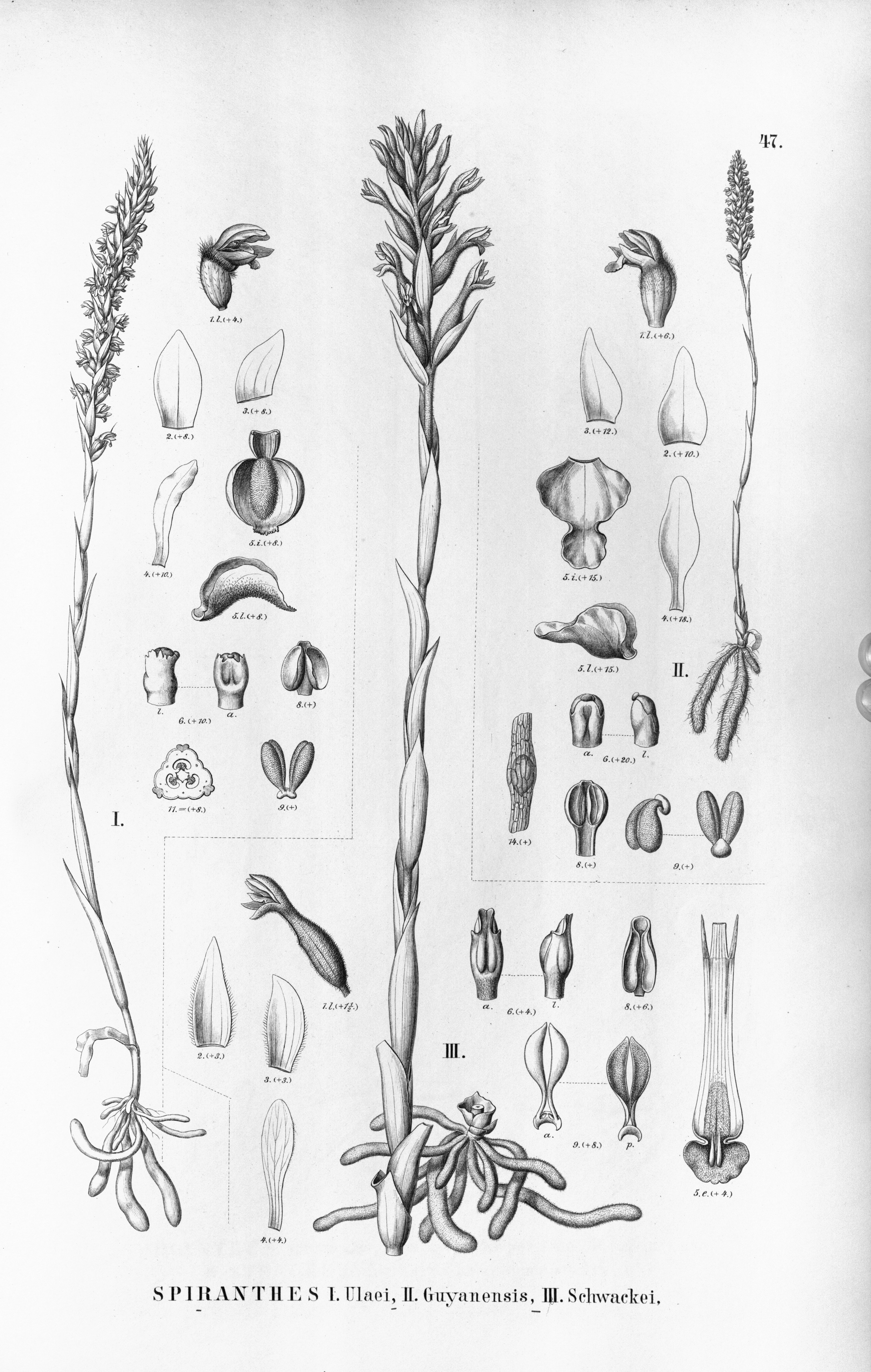
- 1894 illustration Flora Brasiliensis

Scientific classification
- Kingdom: Plantae
- Clade: Tracheophytes
- Clade: Angiosperms
- Clade: Monocots
- Order: Asparagales
- Family: Orchidaceae
- Subfamily: Orchidoideae
- Tribe: Cranichideae
- Genus: Brachystele
- Species: B. guayanensis

Binomial name
- Brachystele guayanensis (Lindl.) Schltr.

Synonyms
- Brachystele guyanensis Schltr., spelling error; Goodyera guayanensis Lindl.; Spiranthes guayanensis (Lindl.) Cogn. in C.F.P.von Martius; Spiranthes aguacatensis Rchb.f.; Spiranthes hostmannii Rchb.f. ex Griseb.; Gyrostachys aguacatensis Kuntze; Gyrostachys hostmannii (Rchb.f. ex Griseb.) Kuntze; Spiranthes brenesii Schltr.; Brachystele aguacatensis (Rchb.f.) Schltr.; Brachystele brenesii (Schltr.) Schltr.

= Brachystele guayanensis =

Species of flowering plant

Brachystele guayanensis is a species of orchid. It is native to southern Mexico, Central America (Costa Rica, El Salvador, Guatemala and Honduras), Trinidad and Tobago, and northern South America (Colombia, Venezuela, Guyana, Suriname, French Guiana, Bolivia, northern Brazil).
