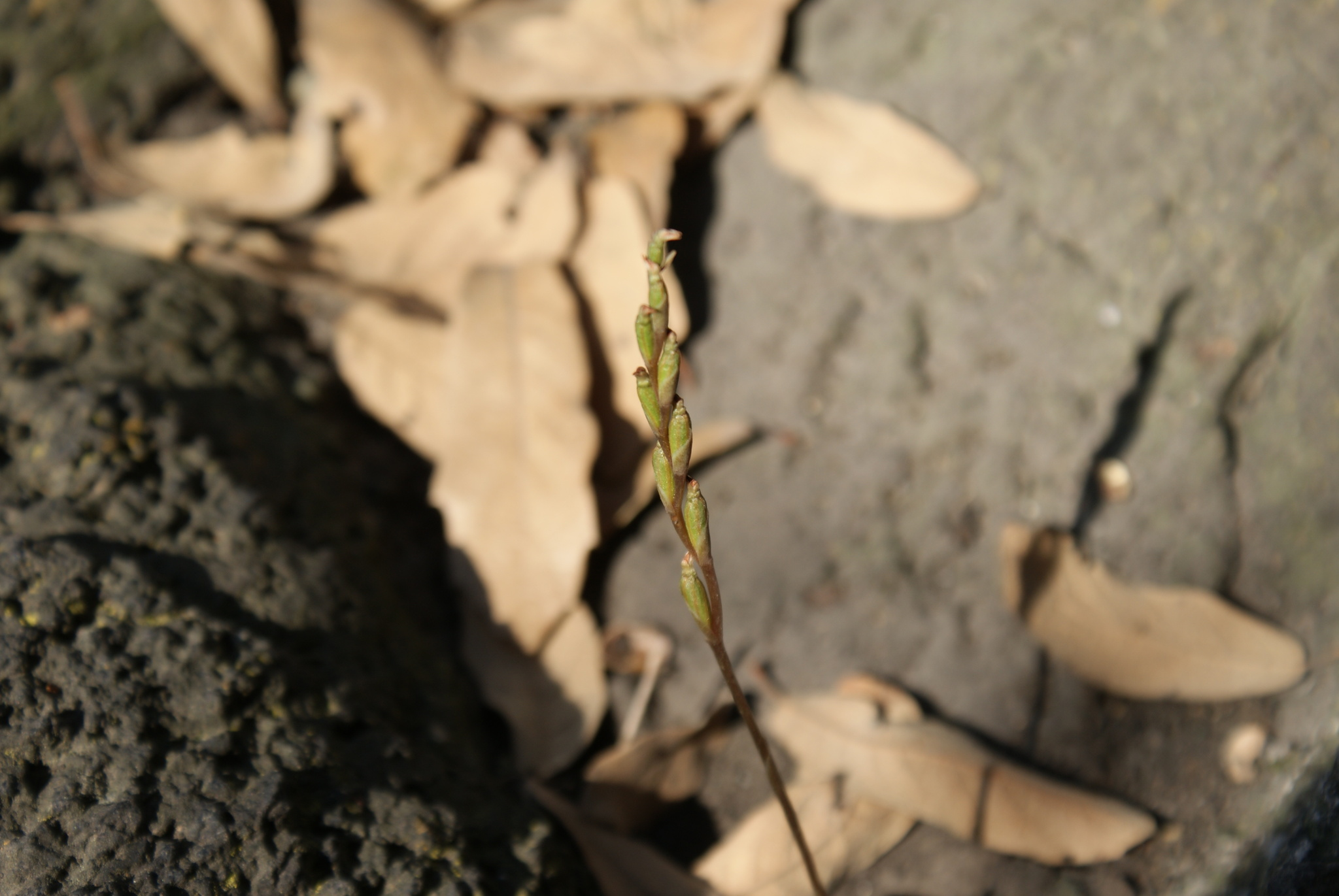
- Microthelys minutiflora

Scientific classification
- Kingdom: Plantae
- Clade: Tracheophytes
- Clade: Angiosperms
- Clade: Monocots
- Order: Asparagales
- Family: Orchidaceae
- Subfamily: Orchidoideae
- Tribe: Cranichideae
- Subtribe: Spiranthinae
- Genus: Microthelys; Garay

Synonyms
- Ecuadoria Dodson & Dressler

= Microthelys =

Genus of orchids

Microthelys is a genus of flowering plants from the orchid family, Orchidaceae. Its species are native to Mexico, Central America and Ecuador.

1. Microthelys constricta (Szlach.) Szlach. - central Mexico
2. Microthelys hintoniorum (Todzia) Szlach., Rutk. & Mytnik - Nuevo León
3. Microthelys intagana (Dodson & Dressler) Szlach. - Ecuador
4. Microthelys markowskiana (Szlach.) Szlach. - Oaxaca
5. Microthelys minutiflora (A.Rich. & Galeotti) Garay - from San Luis Potosí south to Guatemala
6. Microthelys nutantiflora (Schltr.) Garay - Guatemala, Costa Rica
7. Microthelys rubrocallosa (B.L.Rob. & Greenm.) Garay - from central Mexico south to Guatemala

== See also ==
- List of Orchidaceae genera
