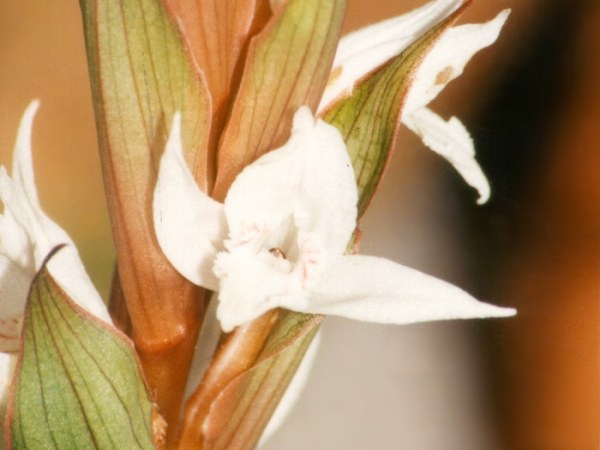
- Pteroglossa roseoalba

Scientific classification
- Kingdom: Plantae
- Clade: Embryophytes
- Clade: Tracheophytes
- Clade: Spermatophytes
- Clade: Angiosperms
- Clade: Monocots
- Order: Asparagales
- Family: Orchidaceae
- Subfamily: Orchidoideae
- Tribe: Cranichideae
- Subtribe: Spiranthinae
- Genus: Pteroglossa; Schltr.

Synonyms
- Cogniauxiocharis (Schltr.) Hoehne; Ochyrella Szlach. & R.González; Callistanthos Szlach.; Lyrochilus Szlach.

= Pteroglossa =

Genus of flowering plants

Pteroglossa is a genus of flowering plants from the orchid family, Orchidaceae. It is native to South America, Central America, and Mexico.

- Pteroglossa euphlebia (Rchb.f.) Garay - Rio de Janeiro
- Pteroglossa glazioviana (Cogn.) Garay - Brazil, Paraguay
- Pteroglossa hilariana (Cogn.) Garay - Brazil
- Pteroglossa lurida (M.N.Correa) Garay - Brazil, Paraguay, Argentina
- Pteroglossa luteola Garay - Argentina
- Pteroglossa macrantha (Rchb.f.) Schltr. - Brazil, Paraguay, Venezuela
- Pteroglossa magnifica Szlach. - Paraguay
- Pteroglossa regia (Kraenzl.) Schltr. - Argentina
- Pteroglossa rhombipetala Garay - Paraguay, Argentina
- Pteroglossa roseoalba (Rchb.f.) Salazar & M.W.Chase - widespread from Oaxaca to Argentina

== See also ==
- List of Orchidaceae genera
