= Buchtienia rosea =

Scientific classification
- Kingdom: Plantae
- Clade: Tracheophytes
- Clade: Angiosperms
- Clade: Monocots
- Order: Asparagales
- Family: Orchidaceae
- Subfamily: Orchidoideae
- Tribe: Cranichideae
- Genus: Buchtienia
- Species: B. rosea

Binomial name
- Buchtienia rosea Garay

Species of plant

Buchtienia rosea is a species in the genus Buchtienia, a genus of flowering plants from the orchid family, Orchidaceae. It is native to Central Peru.
