= Lyroglossa =

Scientific classification
- Kingdom: Plantae
- Clade: Tracheophytes
- Clade: Angiosperms
- Clade: Monocots
- Order: Asparagales
- Family: Orchidaceae
- Subfamily: Orchidoideae
- Tribe: Cranichideae
- Subtribe: Spiranthinae
- Genus: Lyroglossa; Schltr.

Genus of orchids

Lyroglossa is a genus of flowering plants from the orchid family, Orchidaceae. It contains two known species, native to the American tropics:

- Lyroglossa grisebachii (Cogn.) Schltr. - Brazil, French Guiana, Guyana, Suriname, Venezuela, Colombia, Trinidad
- Lyroglossa pubicaulis (L.O.Williams) Garay - Veracruz, Belize

== See also ==
- List of Orchidaceae genera
