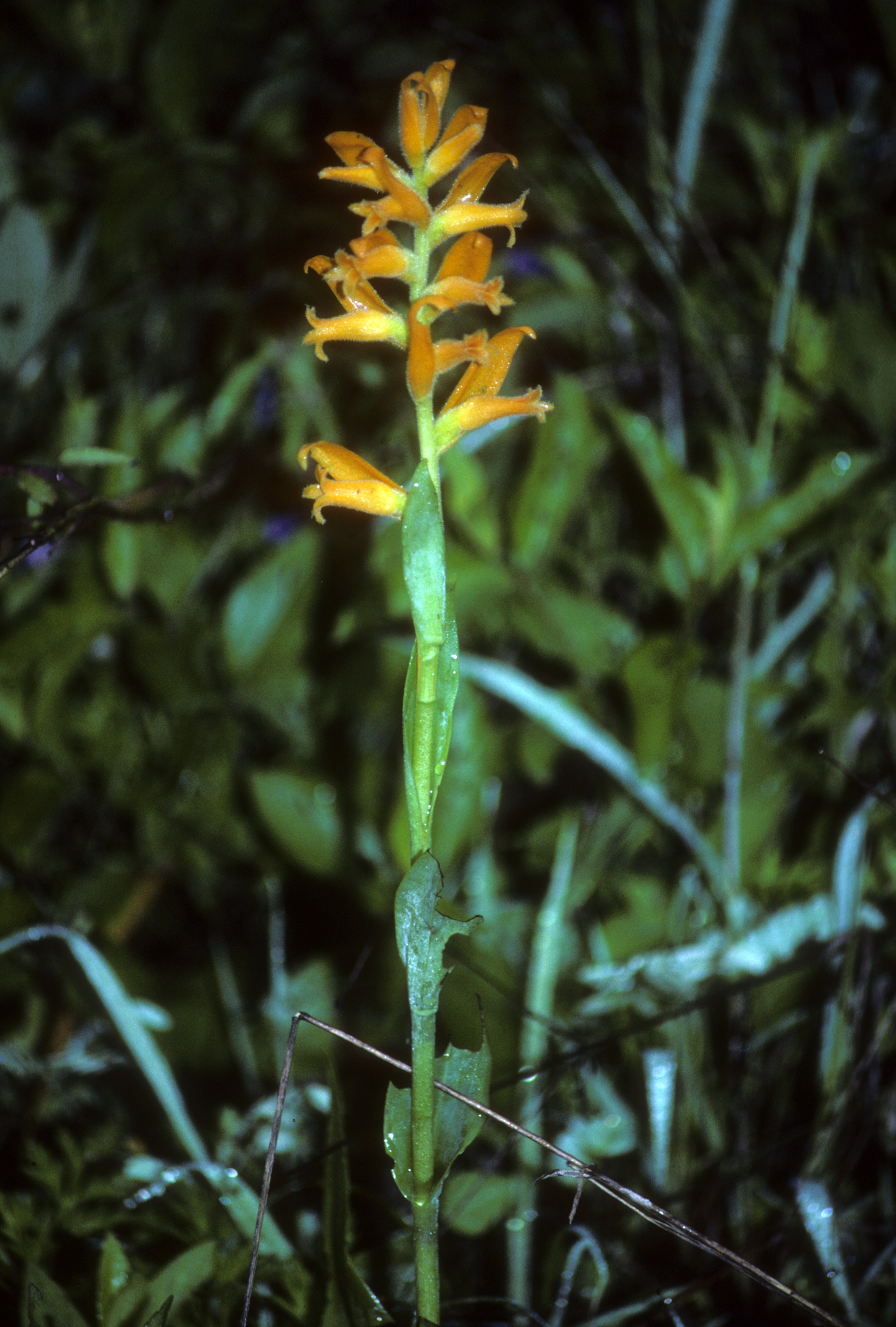

Scientific classification
- Kingdom: Plantae
- Clade: Tracheophytes
- Clade: Angiosperms
- Clade: Monocots
- Order: Asparagales
- Family: Orchidaceae
- Subfamily: Orchidoideae
- Tribe: Cranichideae
- Genus: Dichromanthus
- Species: D. aurantiacus

Binomial name
- Dichromanthus aurantiacus (Lex.) Salazar & Soto Arenas

Synonyms
- Neottia aurantiaca Lex. in P.de La Llave & J.M.de Lexarza; Stenorrhynchos aurantiacum (Lex.) Lindl.; Spiranthes aurantiaca (Lex.) Hemsl.; Gyrostachys aurantiaca (Lex.) Kuntze

= Dichromanthus aurantiacus =

Species of plant

Dichromanthus aurantiacus is a terrestrial species of orchid. It is native to much of Mexico, Guatemala, Honduras and El Salvador. It is a common and conspicuous weed in fallow fields in much of the region.
