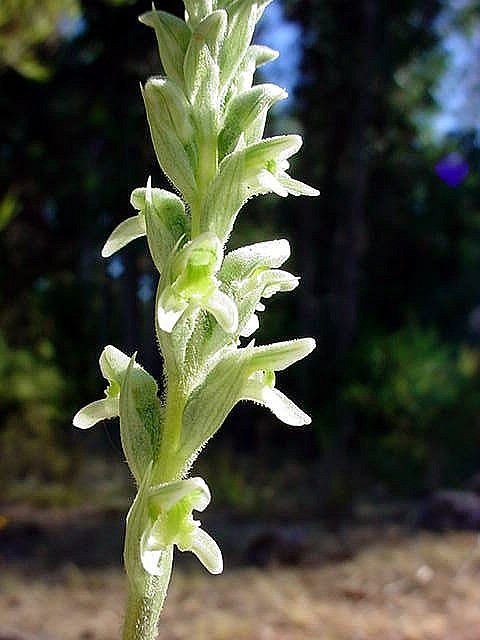
- Odontorrhynchus domeykoanus

Scientific classification
- Kingdom: Plantae
- Clade: Tracheophytes
- Clade: Angiosperms
- Clade: Monocots
- Order: Asparagales
- Family: Orchidaceae
- Subfamily: Orchidoideae
- Tribe: Cranichideae
- Subtribe: Spiranthinae
- Genus: Odontorrhynchus; M.N.Correa

= Odontorrhynchus =

Genus of orchids

Odontorrhynchus is a genus of orchids (family Orchidaceae) belonging to the subfamily Orchidoideae. It constrains 6 known species, all native to the southern half of South America.

- Odontorrhynchus alticola Garay - Peru, Argentina
- Odontorrhynchus castillonii (Hauman) M.N.Correa - Bolivia, Argentina
- Odontorrhynchus domeykoanus Szlach. - Chile
- Odontorrhynchus erosus Szlach. - Chile
- Odontorrhynchus monstrosus Szlach. - Bolivia
- Odontorrhynchus variabilis Garay - Chile
