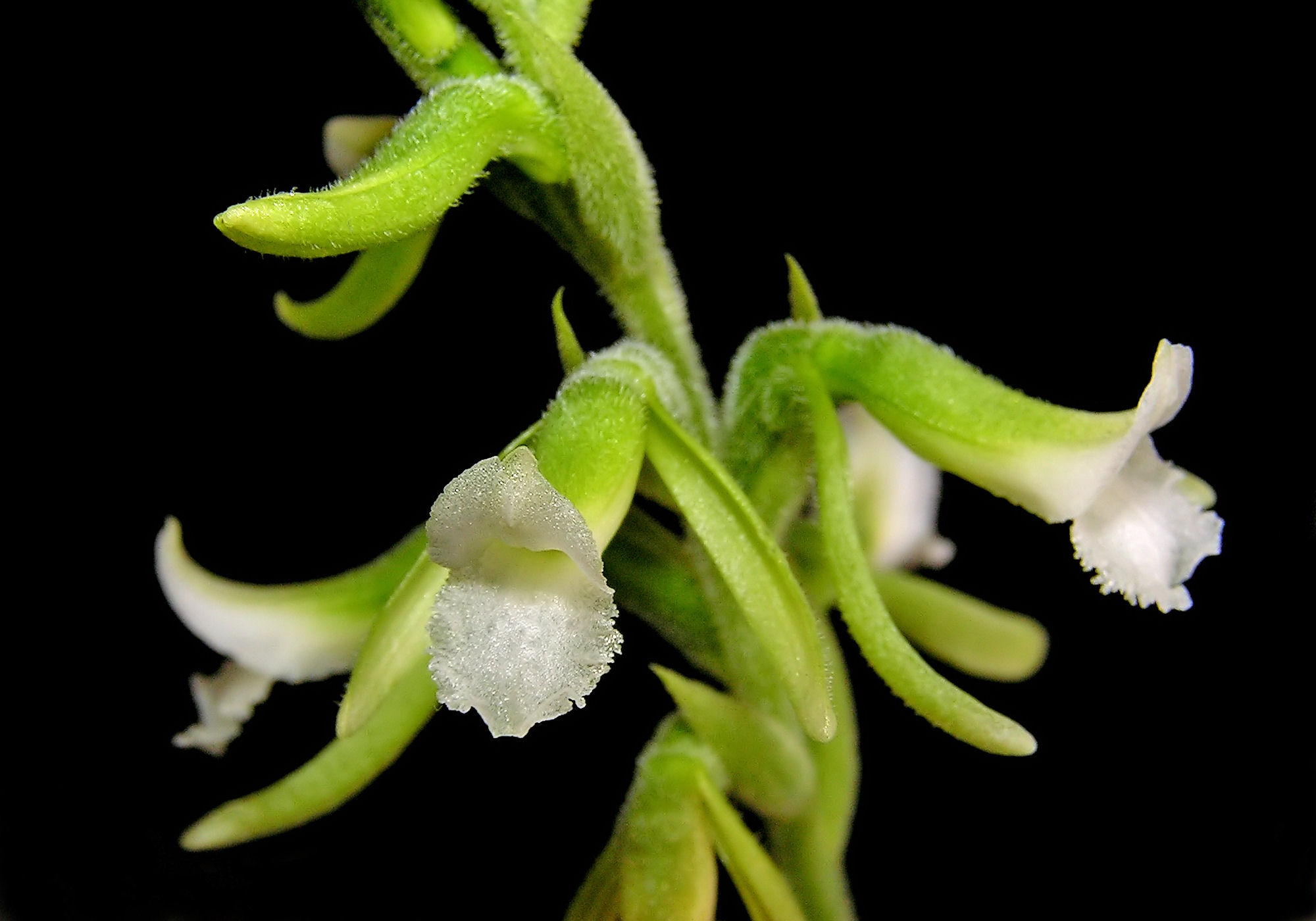

Scientific classification
- Kingdom: Plantae
- Clade: Tracheophytes
- Clade: Angiosperms
- Clade: Monocots
- Order: Asparagales
- Family: Orchidaceae
- Subfamily: Orchidoideae
- Tribe: Cranichideae
- Subtribe: Spiranthinae
- Genus: Thelyschista; Garay
- Species: T. ghillanyi

Binomial name
- Thelyschista ghillanyi (Pabst) Garay

Synonyms
- Odontorrhynchus ghillanyi Pabst

= Thelyschista =

Genus of orchids

Thelyschista is a monotypic genus of flowering plants from the orchid family, Orchidaceae. The sole species is Thelyschista ghillanyi, endemic to the Bahia region of Brazil.

== See also ==
- List of Orchidaceae genera
