= Physogyne =

Scientific classification
- Kingdom: Plantae
- Clade: Tracheophytes
- Clade: Angiosperms
- Clade: Monocots
- Order: Asparagales
- Family: Orchidaceae
- Subfamily: Orchidoideae
- Tribe: Cranichideae
- Subtribe: Spiranthinae
- Genus: Physogyne; Garay

Genus of orchids

Physogyne is a genus of flowering plants from the orchid family, Orchidaceae. It contains three known species, all endemic to Mexico.

- Physogyne garayana R.González & Szlach. - Colima
- Physogyne gonzalezii (L.O.Williams) Garay - Colima, Nayarit, Jalisco
- Physogyne sparsiflora (C.Schweinf.) Garay - Morelos, Jalisco

== See also ==
- List of Orchidaceae genera
