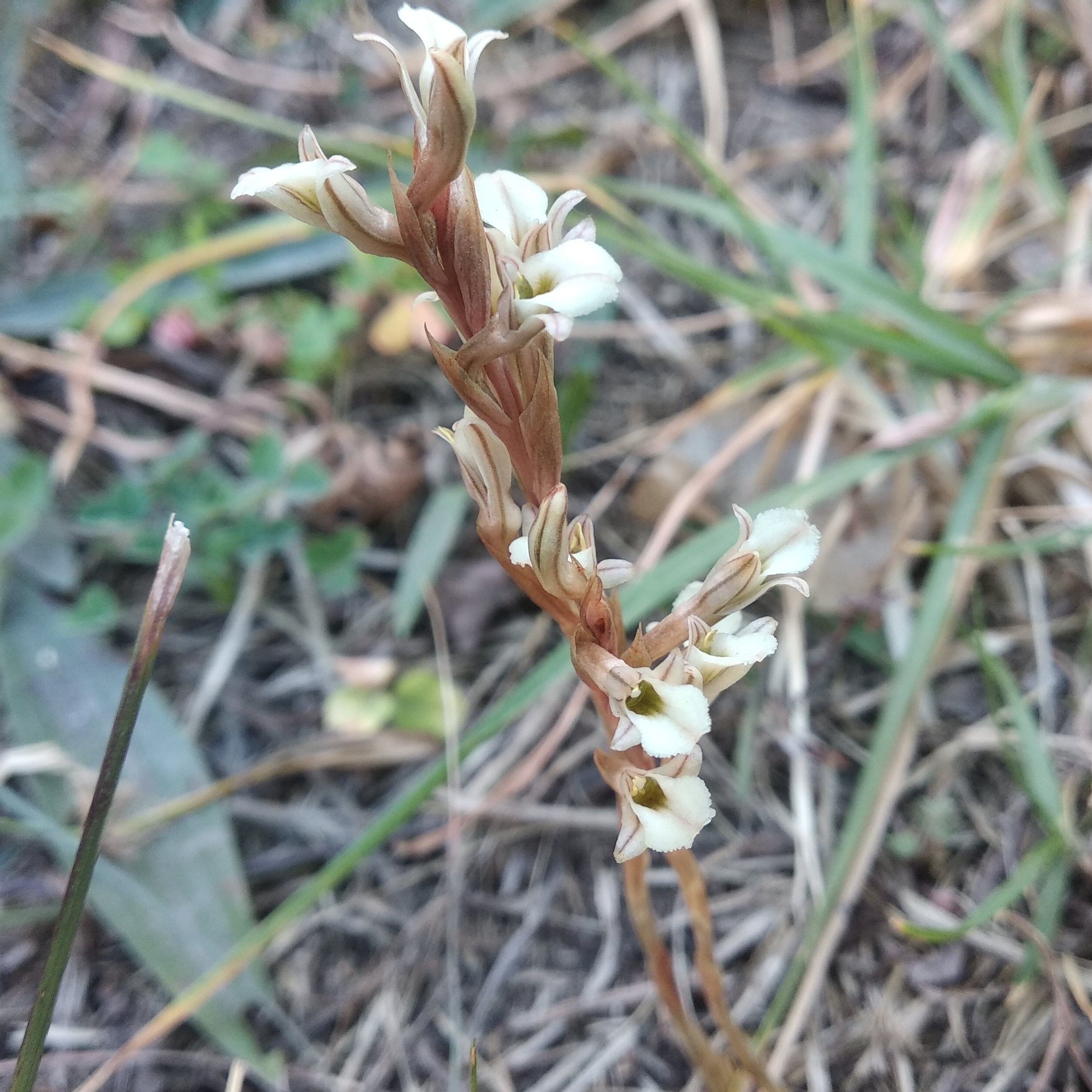
- Schiedeella crenulata

Scientific classification
- Kingdom: Plantae
- Clade: Tracheophytes
- Clade: Angiosperms
- Clade: Monocots
- Order: Asparagales
- Family: Orchidaceae
- Subfamily: Orchidoideae
- Tribe: Cranichideae
- Subtribe: Spiranthinae
- Genus: Schiedeella; Schltr. (1920)

Synonyms
- Gularia Garay (1980 publ. 1982)

= Schiedeella =

Genus of flowering plants

Schiedeella is a genus of flowering plants from the orchid family, Orchidaceae. It is native to the Western Hemisphere: Mexico, the West Indies and Central America, with one species (S. arizonica) in the southwestern United States (Arizona, New Mexico and Texas).

== Species ==
19 species are accepted.

1. Schiedeella affinis (C.Schweinf.) Salazar
2. Schiedeella albovaginata (C.Schweinf.) Burns-Bal.
3. Schiedeella arizonica P.M.Br.
4. Schiedeella crenulata (L.O.Williams) Espejo & López-Ferr.
5. Schiedeella dendroneura (Sheviak & Bye) Burns-Bal.
6. Schiedeella dressleri Szlach.
7. Schiedeella esquintlensis Szlach., Rutk. & Mytnik
8. Schiedeella faucisanguinea (Dod) Burns-Bal. ex A.E.Serna & López-Ferr.
9. Schiedeella fragrans Szlach.
10. Schiedeella jean-mulleri Szlach., Rutk. & Mytnik
11. Schiedeella nagelii (L.O.Williams) Garay
12. Schiedeella pandurata (Garay) Espejo & López-Ferr.
13. Schiedeella saltensis Schltr.
14. Schiedeella schlechteriana Szlach. & Sheviak
15. Schiedeella tamayoana Szlach., Rutk. & Mytnik
16. Schiedeella transversalis (A.Rich. & Galeotti) Schltr.
17. Schiedeella trilineata (Lindl.) Burns-Bal.
18. Schiedeella violacea (A.Rich. & Galeotti) Garay
19. Schiedeella williamsiana Szlach., Rutk. & Mytnik

=== Formerly placed here ===
- Funkiella parasitica (A.Rich. & Galeotti) Salazar & Soto Arenas (as Schiedeella parasitica (A.Rich. & Galeotti) Schltr.)
- Greenwoodiella wercklei (Schltr.) Salazar & R.Jiménez (as Schiedeella wercklei (Schltr.) Garay)

== See also ==
- List of Orchidaceae genera
