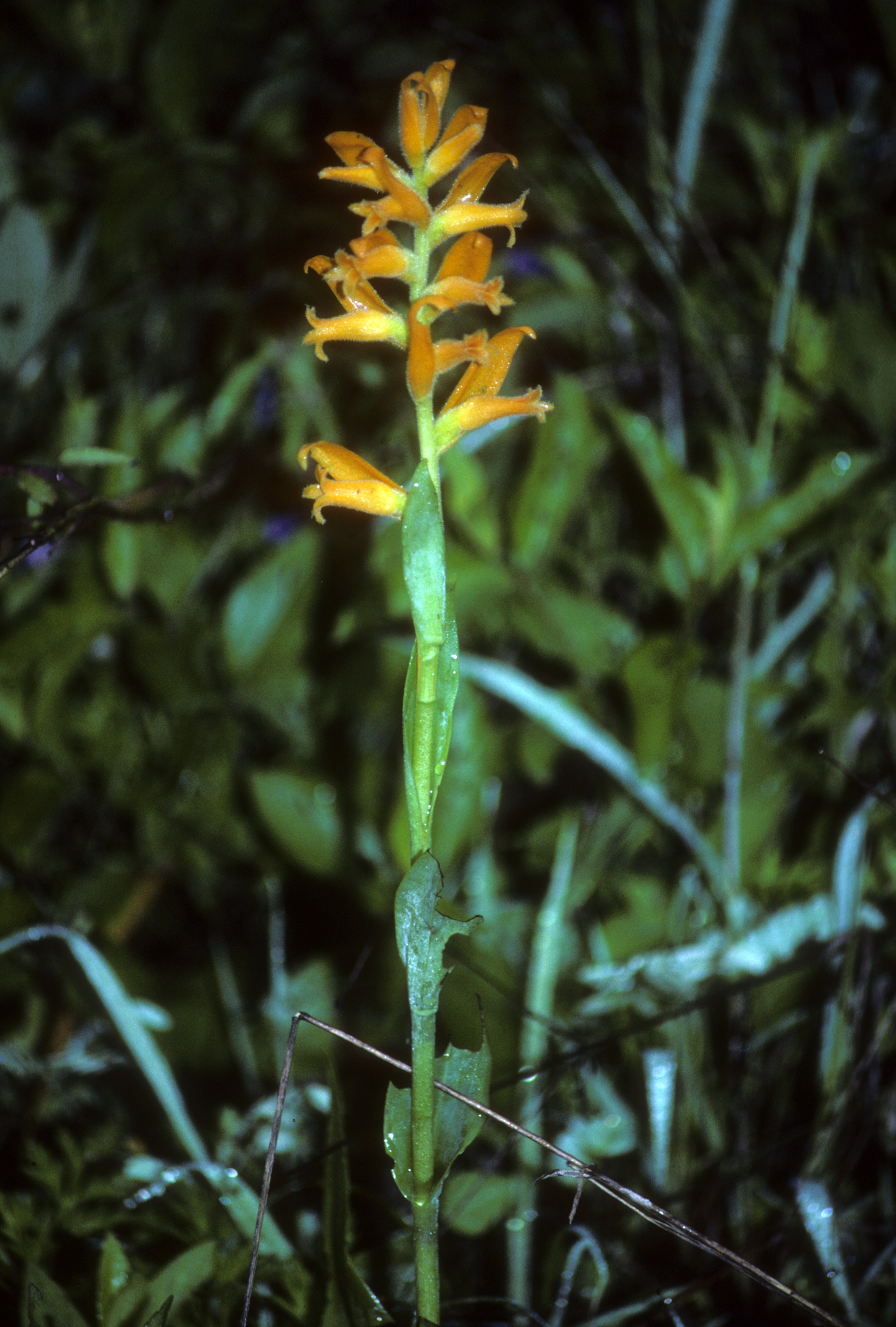
- Dichromanthus aurantiacus

Scientific classification
- Kingdom: Plantae
- Clade: Tracheophytes
- Clade: Angiosperms
- Clade: Monocots
- Order: Asparagales
- Family: Orchidaceae
- Subfamily: Orchidoideae
- Tribe: Cranichideae
- Subtribe: Spiranthinae
- Genus: Dichromanthus; Garay

Synonyms
- Cutsis Burns-Bal., E.W.Greenw. & R.González

= Dichromanthus =

Genus of orchids

Dichromanthus is a genus of flowering plants from the orchid family, Orchidaceae. As currently delimited, it is monophyletic and includes four species:

1. Dichromanthus aurantiacus (Lex.) Salazar & Soto Arenas - much of Mexico, south to Honduras
2. Dichromanthus cinnabarinus (Lex.) Garay - from Texas to Guatemala
3. Dichromanthus michuacanus (Lex.) Salazar & Soto Arenas - from Texas and Arizona south to Honduras
4. Dichromanthus yucundaa Salazar & García-Mend. - Oaxaca

The genus ranges from the southwestern United States (Texas and Arizona) through most Mexican mountain ranges to Guatemala, El Salvador and Honduras. Except for the narrow endemic D. yucundaa, restricted to the Mexican state of Oaxaca, all other species are widespread and locally common.

== See also ==
- List of Orchidaceae genera
