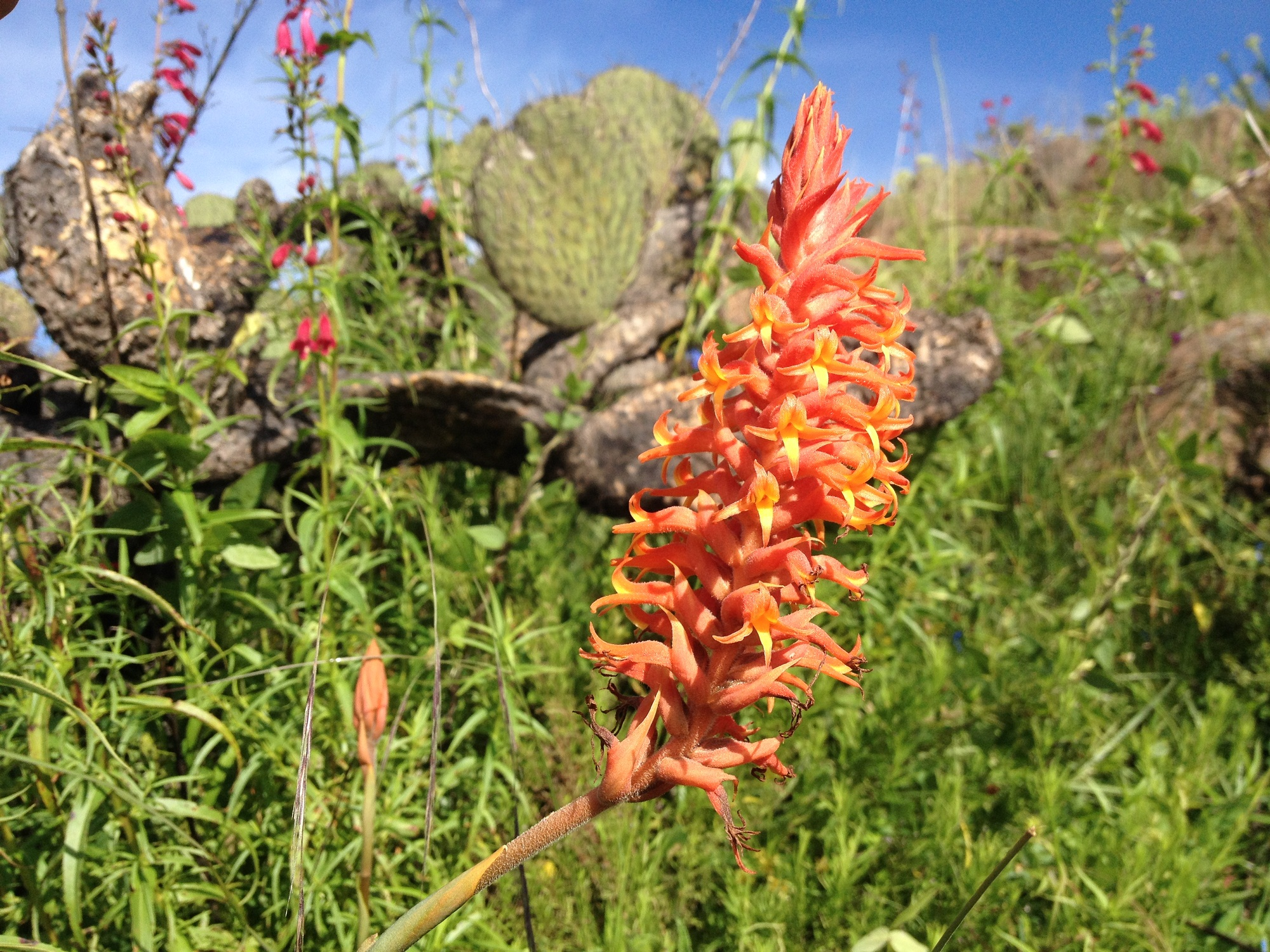
- Dichromanthus cinnabarinus (inflorescence)

Scientific classification
- Kingdom: Plantae
- Clade: Tracheophytes
- Clade: Angiosperms
- Clade: Monocots
- Order: Asparagales
- Family: Orchidaceae
- Subfamily: Orchidoideae
- Tribe: Cranichideae
- Genus: Dichromanthus
- Species: D. cinnabarinus

Binomial name
- Dichromanthus cinnabarinus (Lex.) Garay

Synonyms
- Neottia cinnabarina Lex. in P.de La Llave & J.M.de Lexarza; Stenorrhynchos cinnabarinum (Lex.) Lindl.; Spiranthes cinnabarina (Lex.) Hemsl.; Gyrostachys cinnabarina (Lex.) Kuntze; Cutsis cinnabarina (Lex.) C.Nelson; Stenorrhynchos montanum Lindl. in G.Bentham; Spiranthes montana A.Rich. & Galeotti 1845, illegitimate homonym, not Raf. 1833; Ophrys peregrina Sessé & Moc.; Gyrostachys montana (Lindl.) Kuntze; Stenorrhynchos galeottianum Schltr.; Dichromanthus cinnabarinus subsp. galeottianum (Schltr.) Soto Arenas & Salazar; Dichromanthus cinnabarinus f. aureus P.M.Br.

= Dichromanthus cinnabarinus =

Scarlet ladies' tresses

Species of orchid

Dichromanthus cinnabarinus, commonly known as scarlet ladies' tresses, is a terrestrial species of orchid. It is common across much of Mexico, south to Guatemala, and north into Texas.
