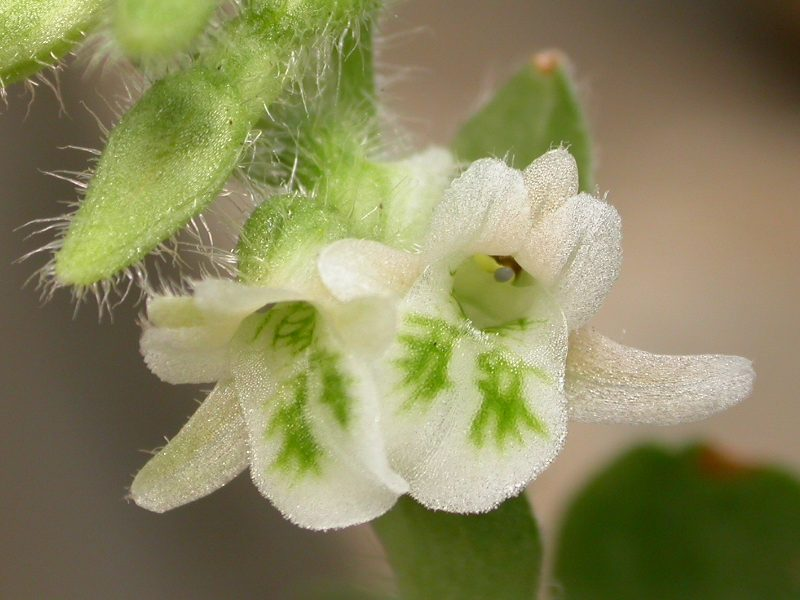
- Lankesterella gnomus

Scientific classification
- Kingdom: Plantae
- Clade: Tracheophytes
- Clade: Angiosperms
- Clade: Monocots
- Order: Asparagales
- Family: Orchidaceae
- Subfamily: Orchidoideae
- Tribe: Cranichideae
- Subtribe: Spiranthinae
- Genus: Lankesterella; Ames

Synonyms
- Cladobium Schltr., illegitimate name

= Lankesterella =

Genus of orchids

Lankesterella is a genus of flowering plants from the orchid family, Orchidaceae. It is found mostly in South America, with a few species extending north into Cuba, the Dominican Republic and Costa Rica.

== Species ==
Species currently recognized as of June 2014:

- Lankesterella alainii Nir - Cuba, Dominican Republic
- Lankesterella caespitosa (Lindl.) Hoehne - Venezuela, Brazil
- Lankesterella ceracifolia (Barb.Rodr.) Mansf. - Venezuela, Brazil, Paraguay, Argentina
- Lankesterella glandula Ackerman - Dominican Republic
- Lankesterella gnomus (Kraenzl.) Hoehne - Brazil
- Lankesterella longicollis (Cogn.) Hoehne - Brazil
- Lankesterella orthantha (Kraenzl.) Garay - Costa Rica, Venezuela, Colombia, Ecuador, Peru
- Lankesterella parvula (Kraenzl.) Pabst - Rio de Janeiro
- Lankesterella pilosa (Cogn.) Hoehne - Rio de Janeiro
- Lankesterella salehi Pabst - Brazil
- Lankesterella spannageliana (Hoehne & Brade) Mansf. - Rio de Janeiro

== See also ==
- List of Orchidaceae genera
