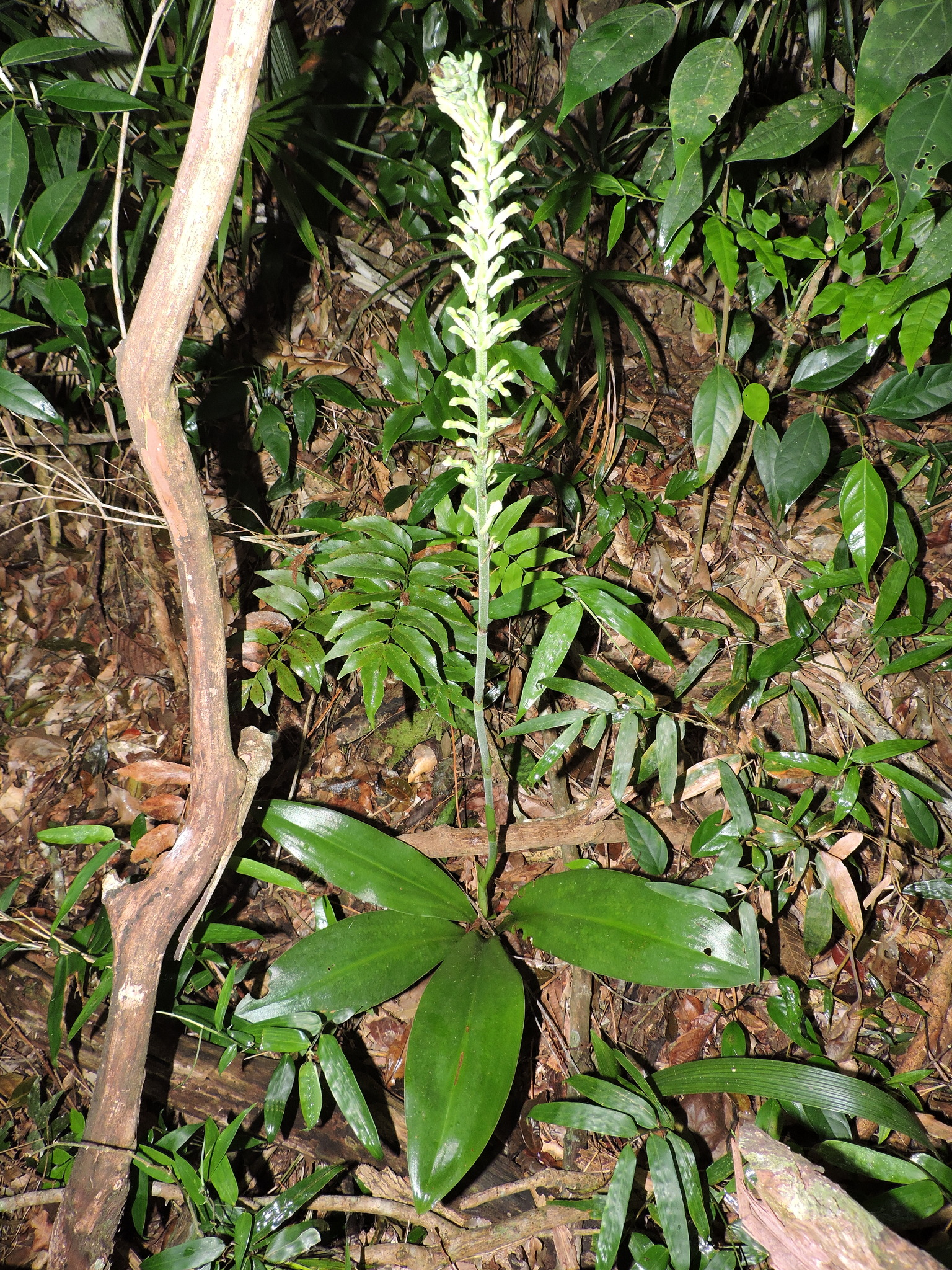
- Sauroglossum elatum

Scientific classification
- Kingdom: Plantae
- Clade: Tracheophytes
- Clade: Angiosperms
- Clade: Monocots
- Order: Asparagales
- Family: Orchidaceae
- Subfamily: Orchidoideae
- Tribe: Cranichideae
- Subtribe: Spiranthinae
- Genus: Sauroglossum; Lindl. (1833)

Synonyms
- Synassa Lindl.; Schidorhynchos Szlach.

= Sauroglossum =

Genus of flowering plants

Sauroglossum is a genus of flowering plants from the orchid family, Orchidaceae. The genus is endemic to South America. As of June 2014, the following species are recognized:

- Sauroglossum andinum (Hauman) Garay - Ecuador, Argentina
- Sauroglossum aurantiacum (C.Schweinf.) Garay - Peru
- Sauroglossum corymbosum (Lindl.) Garay - Peru, Bolivia
- Sauroglossum distans Lindl. ex Garay - Bolivia
- Sauroglossum dromadum Szlach. - Peru
- Sauroglossum elatum Lindl - Ecuador, Argentina, Colombia, Brazil
- Sauroglossum longiflorum (Schltr.) Garay - Ecuador, Colombia
- Sauroglossum odoratum Robatsch - Rio de Janeiro
- Sauroglossum organense Szlach. - Rio de Janeiro
- Sauroglossum schweinfurthianum Garay - Peru
- Sauroglossum sellilabre (Griseb.) Schltr. - Paraguay, Argentina

== See also ==
- List of Orchidaceae genera
