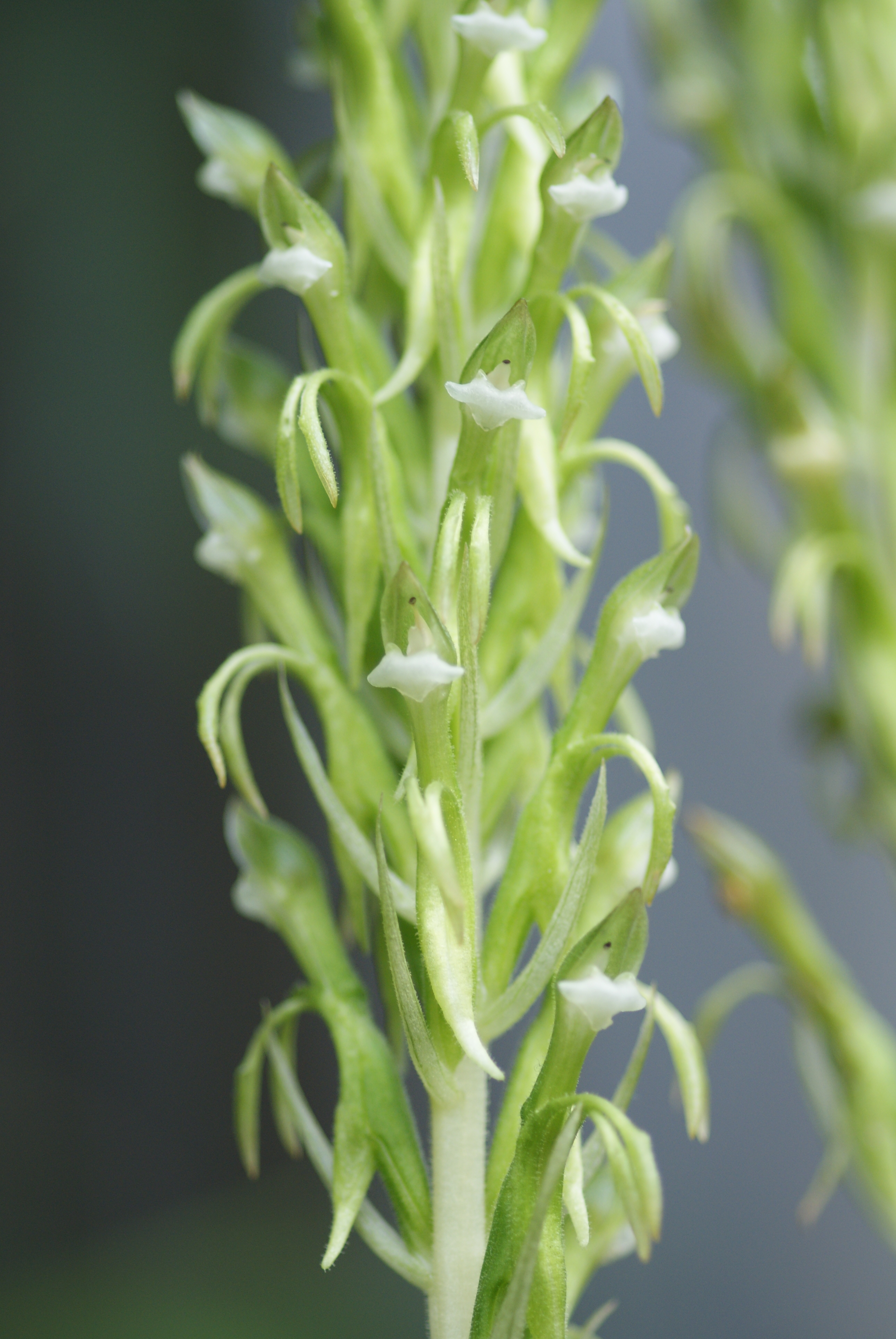
- Pelexia laxa

Scientific classification
- Kingdom: Plantae
- Clade: Tracheophytes
- Clade: Angiosperms
- Clade: Monocots
- Order: Asparagales
- Family: Orchidaceae
- Subfamily: Orchidoideae
- Tribe: Cranichideae
- Subtribe: Spiranthinae
- Genus: Pelexia; Poit. ex Rich.

Synonyms
- Collea Lindl.; Adnula Raf.; Pachygenium (Schltr.) Szlach., R.González & Rutk.

= Pelexia =

Genus of orchids

Pelexia is a genus of flowering plants from the orchid family, Orchidaceae. It has about 60-70 accepted species, native to Latin America, the West Indies and Florida.

== See also ==
- List of Orchidaceae genera
