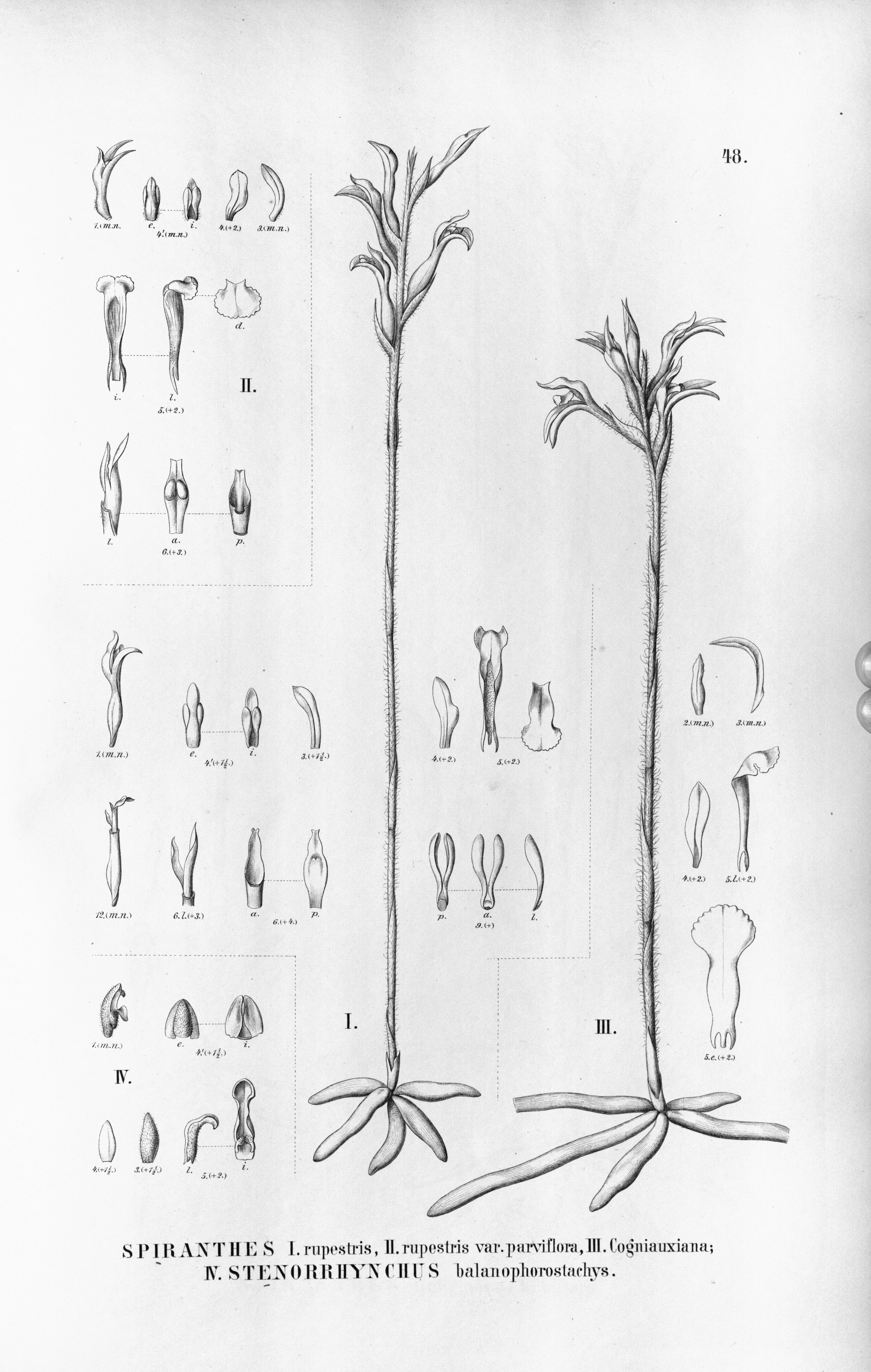
- Skeptrostachys rupestris fig. I and II; 1895 illustration

Scientific classification
- Kingdom: Plantae
- Clade: Tracheophytes
- Clade: Angiosperms
- Clade: Monocots
- Order: Asparagales
- Family: Orchidaceae
- Subfamily: Orchidoideae
- Tribe: Cranichideae
- Subtribe: Spiranthinae
- Genus: Skeptrostachys; Garay

Type species
- Skeptrostachys rupestris (Lindl.) Garay.

= Skeptrostachys =

Genus of flowering plants

Skeptrostachys is a genus of flowering plants from the orchid family, Orchidaceae. It is native to eastern South America (Brazil, Uruguay, Argentina, Paraguay, and Suriname).

Species accepted as of June 2014:

1. Skeptrostachys arechavaletanii (Barb.Rodr.) Garay - Brazil, Uruguay
2. Skeptrostachys balanophorostachya (Rchb.f. & Warm.) Garay - Brazil, Uruguay, Paraguay
3. Skeptrostachys berroana (Kraenzl.) Garay - Uruguay
4. Skeptrostachys congestiflora (Cogn.) Garay - Brazil
5. Skeptrostachys correana Szlach. - Argentina
6. Skeptrostachys disoides (Kraenzl.) Garay - Brazil, Argentina, Paraguay
7. Skeptrostachys gigantea (Cogn.) Garay - Brazil, Argentina, Paraguay, Uruguay
8. Skeptrostachys latipetala (Cogn.) Garay - Minas Gerais
9. Skeptrostachys paraguayensis (Rchb.f.) Garay - Brazil, Argentina, Paraguay
10. Skeptrostachys paranahybae (Kraenzl.) Garay - Paraná
11. Skeptrostachys rupestris (Lindl.) Garay - Brazil, Suriname, Paraguay, Uruguay
12. Skeptrostachys stenorrhynchoides Szlach. - Minas Gerais

== See also ==
- List of Orchidaceae genera
