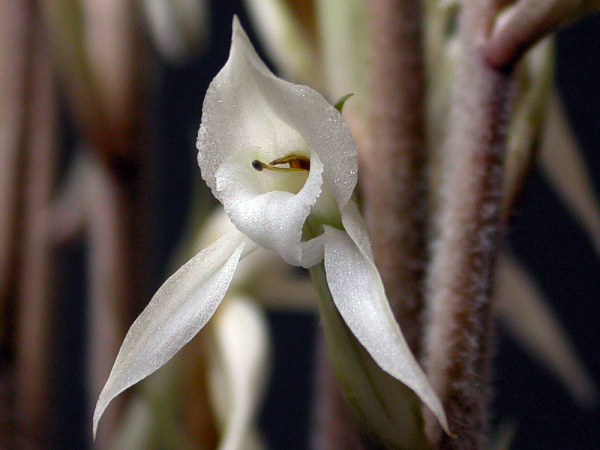
- Eltroplectris schlechteriana

Scientific classification
- Kingdom: Plantae
- Clade: Tracheophytes
- Clade: Angiosperms
- Clade: Monocots
- Order: Asparagales
- Family: Orchidaceae
- Subfamily: Orchidoideae
- Tribe: Cranichideae
- Subtribe: Spiranthinae
- Genus: Eltroplectris; Raf.

Synonyms
- Centrogenium Schltr.

= Eltroplectris =

Long-claw orchid

Species of orchid

Eltroplectris, the long-claw orchid, is a genus of flowering plants from the orchid family, Orchidaceae. It is native to South America, the West Indies, and Florida.

- Eltroplectris assumpcaoana Campacci & Kautsky - Brazil
- Eltroplectris brachycentron Szlach. -Bolivia
- Eltroplectris calcarata (Sw.) Garay & H.R.Sweet - Florida, Bahamas, Cayman Islands, Cuba, Hispaniola, Jamaica, Puerto Rico, Windward Islands, Trinidad, Suriname, Venezuela, Colombia, Peru, Brazil, Paraguay
- Eltroplectris cogniauxiana (Schltr.) Pabst - Brazil
- Eltroplectris dalessandroi Dodson - Ecuador
- Eltroplectris janeirensis (Porto & Brade) Pabst - Brazil
- Eltroplectris kuhlmanniana (Hoehne) Szlach. & Rutk. in P.Rutkowski, D.L.Szlachetko & M.Górniak - Brazil
- Eltroplectris longicornu (Cogn.) Pabst - Brazil
- Eltroplectris macrophylla (Schltr.) Pabst - Brazil
- Eltroplectris misera (Kraenzl.) Szlach. - Brazil
- Eltroplectris rossii Dodson & G.A.Romero - Ecuador
- Eltroplectris schlechteriana (Porto & Brade) Pabst - Brazil, Argentina, Paraguay
- Eltroplectris triloba (Lindl.) Pabst - Brazil, Argentina, Paraguay

== See also ==
- List of Orchidaceae genera
