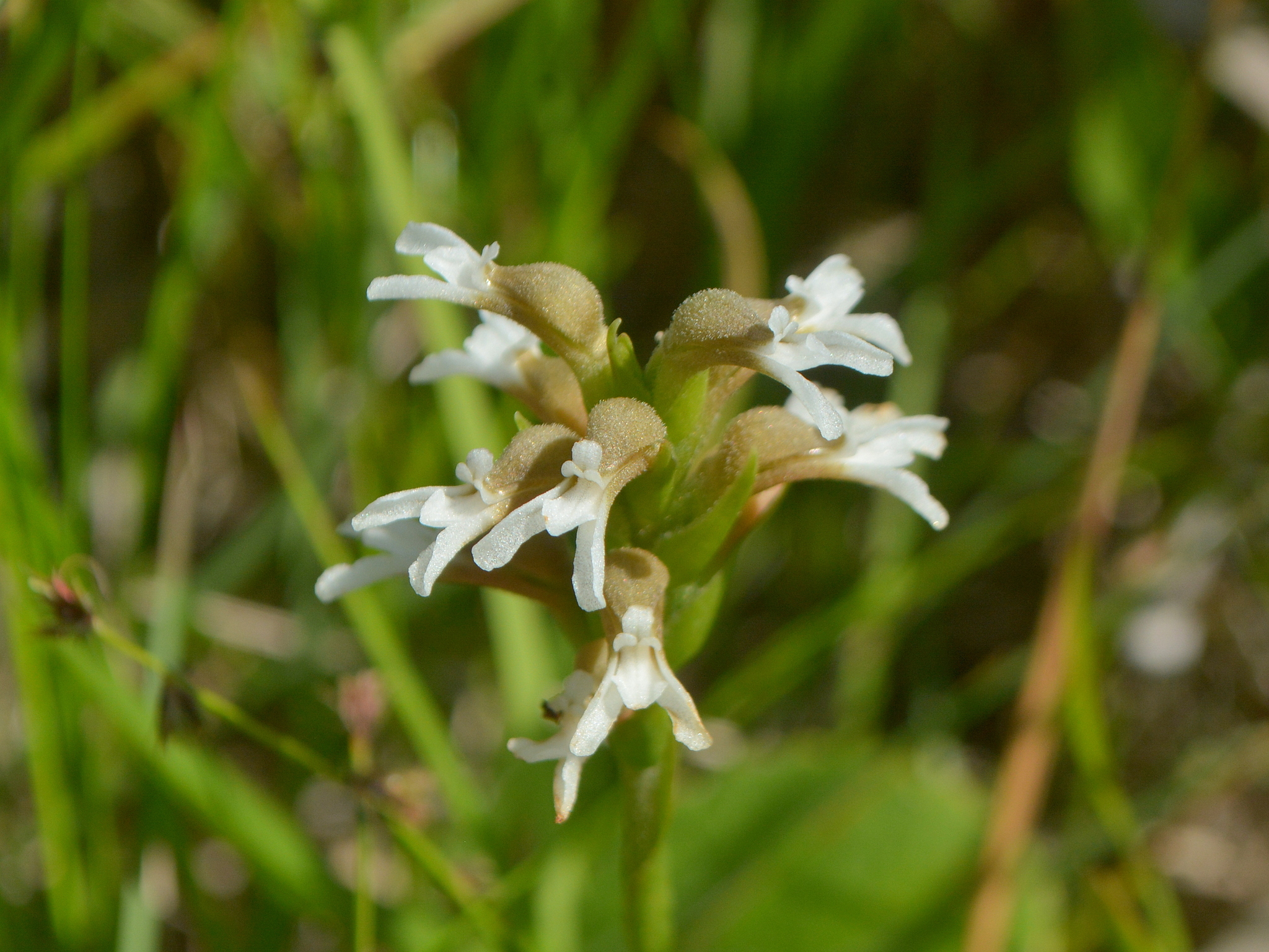
- Veyretia hassleri

Scientific classification
- Kingdom: Plantae
- Clade: Tracheophytes
- Clade: Angiosperms
- Clade: Monocots
- Order: Asparagales
- Family: Orchidaceae
- Subfamily: Orchidoideae
- Tribe: Cranichideae
- Subtribe: Spiranthinae
- Genus: Veyretia; Szlach.

= Veyretia =

Genus of orchids

Veyretia is a genus of terrestrial orchids native to South America and Trinidad.

- Veyretia aphylla (Ridl.) Szlach. - Colombia, Venezuela, Guyana, Brazil
- Veyretia caudata (R.J.V.Alves) Mytnik - Minas Gerais
- Veyretia cogniauxiana (Barb.Rodr. ex Cogn.) Szlach. - Minas Gerais
- Veyretia hassleri (Cogn.) Szlach. - Brazil, Paraguay
- Veyretia neuroptera (Rchb.f. & Warm.) Szlach. - Colombia, Venezuela, Argentina, Brazil
- Veyretia rupicola (Garay) F.Barros - Brazil
- Veyretia sagittata (Rchb.f. & Warm.) Szlach. - French Guiana, Argentina, Brazil
- Veyretia simplex (Griseb.) Szlach. - Trinidad, Venezuela, Guyana, Brazil
- Veyretia sincorensis (Schltr.) Szlach. - Bahia
- Veyretia szlachetkoana Mytnik - Colombia, Venezuela
- Veyretia undulata Szlach. - Brazil
