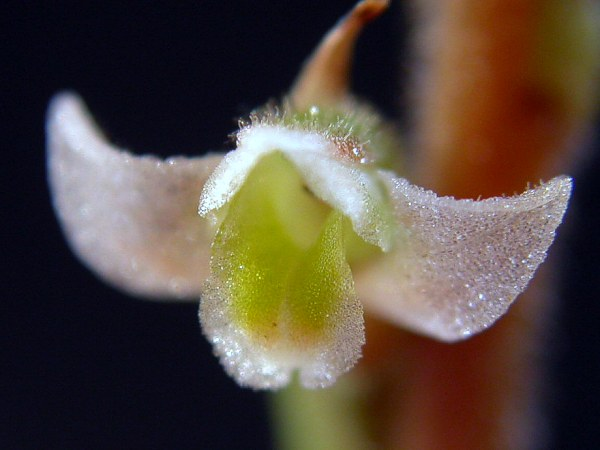
- Mesadenella cuspidata type species

Scientific classification
- Kingdom: Plantae
- Clade: Tracheophytes
- Clade: Angiosperms
- Clade: Monocots
- Order: Asparagales
- Family: Orchidaceae
- Subfamily: Orchidoideae
- Tribe: Cranichideae
- Subtribe: Spiranthinae
- Genus: Mesadenella; Pabst & Garay

Synonyms
- Garaya Szlach.

= Mesadenella =

Genus of orchids

Mesadenella is a genus of flowering plants from the orchid family, Orchidaceae. It consists of 7 known species, native to Mexico, Central America and South America:

- Mesadenella angustisegmenta Garay – Venezuela, Ecuador
- Mesadenella atroviridis (Barb.Rodr.) Garay – Brazil
- Mesadenella cuspidata (Lindl.) Garay – from Colombia east to Guyana and south to Argentina
- Mesadenella meeae R.J.V.Alves – Brazil
- Mesadenella peruviana Garay – Peru
- Mesadenella tonduzii (Schltr.) Pabst & Garay – from southern Mexico south to Nicaragua; also Pará region of Brazil
- Mesadenella variegata D.E.Benn. & Christenson – Peru

== See also ==
- List of Orchidaceae genera
