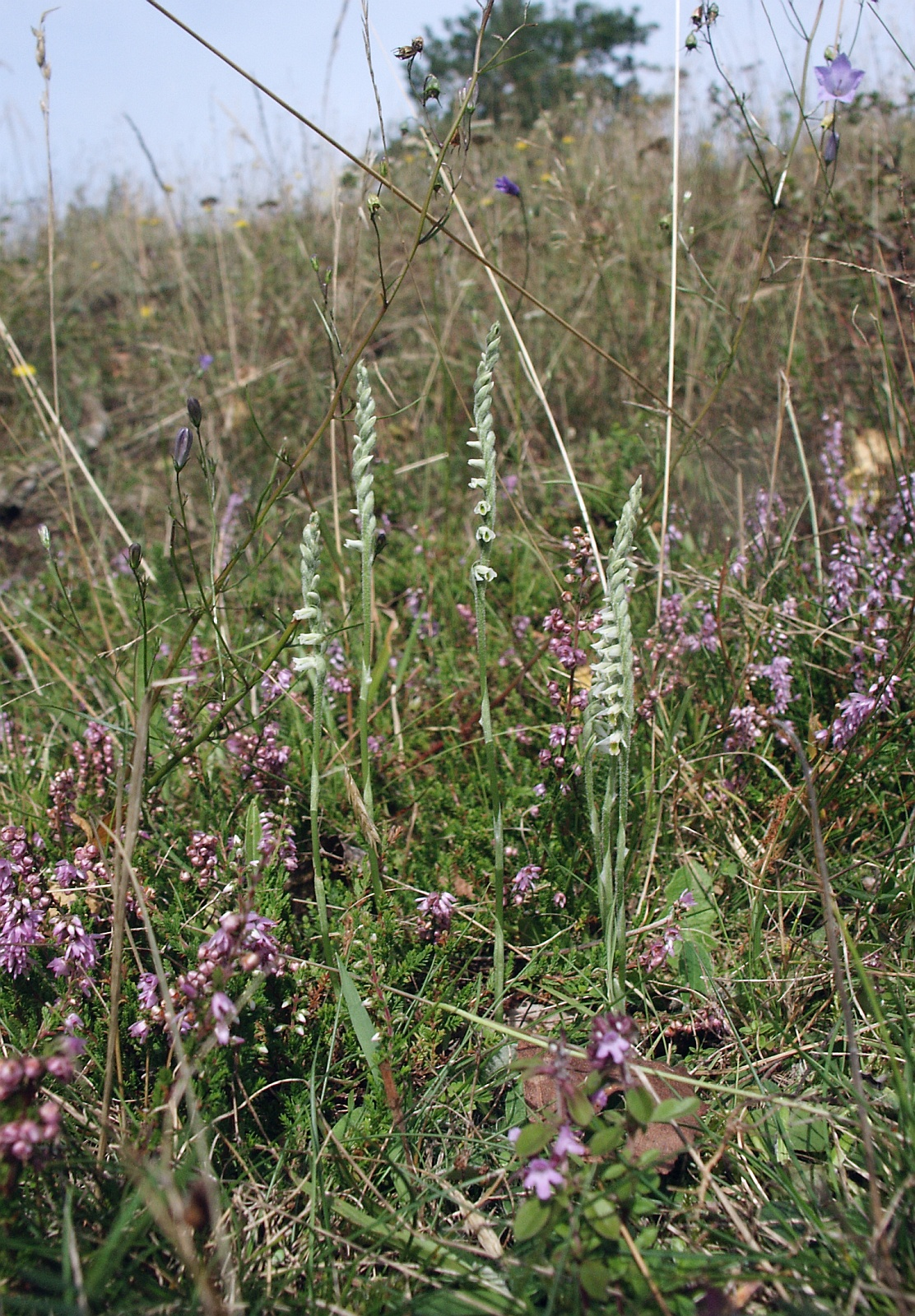
- Spiranthes spiralis, Frankenhöhe, Germany.

Scientific classification
- Kingdom: Plantae
- Clade: Tracheophytes
- Clade: Angiosperms
- Clade: Monocots
- Order: Asparagales
- Family: Orchidaceae
- Subfamily: Orchidoideae
- Tribe: Cranichideae
- Subtribe: Spiranthinae; Lindl. ex Meisn.

Genera
- See text

= Spiranthinae =

Subtribe of orchids

Spiranthinae is an orchid subtribe in the tribe Cranichideae.

Genera accepted in Chase et al.'s 2015 updated classification of orchids:

- Aracamunia
- Aulosepalum
- Beloglottis
- Brachystele
- Buchtienia
- Coccineorchis
- Cotylolabium
- Cybebus
- Cyclopogon
- Degranvillea
- Deiregyne
- Dichromanthus
- Eltroplectris
- Eurystyles
- Funkiella
- Hapalorchis
- Helonoma
- Kionophyton
- Lankesterella
- Lyroglossa
- Mesadenella
- Mesadenus
- Nothostele
- Odontorrhynchus
- Pelexia
- Physogyne
- Pseudogoodyera
- Pteroglossa
- Quechua
- Sacoila
- Sarcoglottis
- Sauroglossum
- Schiedeella
- Skeptrostachys
- Sotoa
- Spiranthes
- Stalkya
- Stenorrhynchos
- Svenkoeltzia
- Thelyschista
- Veyretia

Other genera

- Microthelys

== See also ==
- Taxonomy of the Orchidaceae
