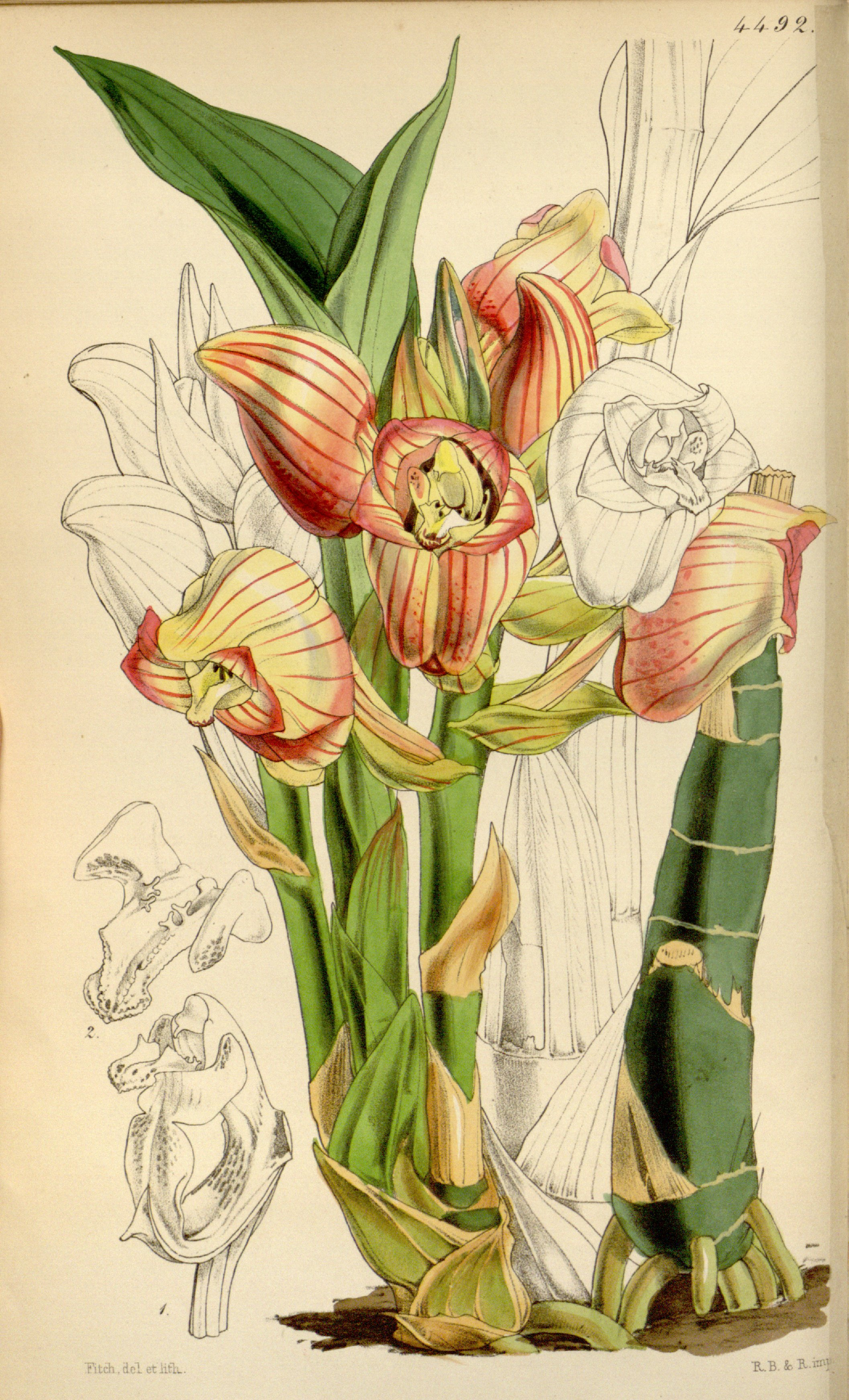
- Acanthophippium javanicum 1850 illustration

Scientific classification
- Kingdom: Plantae
- Clade: Tracheophytes
- Clade: Angiosperms
- Clade: Monocots
- Order: Asparagales
- Family: Orchidaceae
- Subfamily: Epidendroideae
- Tribe: Collabieae
- Genus: Acanthophippium; Blume

Type species
- Acanthophippium javanicum Blume

Species
- See text

= Acanthophippium =

Genus of orchids

Acanthophippium is a genus of orchid with thirteen species (family Orchidaceae). The name of this genus is derived from the Greek words acanthos ("spiny") and ephippion ("saddle"), referring to the saddle-like labellum of the plants.

This terrestrial and sometimes myco-heterotrophic genus of sympodial orchids is distributed from the Indian subcontinent to Taiwan, China, Japan, Southeast Asia, New Guinea and the southwest Pacific.

The terrestrial species are up to 80 cm tall. They have short rhizomes. The oblong and fleshy pseudobulbs are up to 25 cm tall. They produce at their apex 2 to 3 large plicate, lanceolate, parallel-veined leaves, which can be up to 65 cm long.

The erect inflorescence arises laterally from the pseudobulbs, with 3 to 6 flowers, subtended by large, glabrous bracts. The flowers are prominent, large, striated cup- or urn-shaped, fleshy, waxy, and about 4 cm long. They resemble a tulip, a most unusual shape for an orchid. The flowers have a wide range of colors, from dull yellow to red to shades of orange and pink, marked with stripes or spots. The blossoms are usually odiferous with a very strong fragrance.

This genus is allied to genera Calanthe, Cephalantheropsis, Phaius, and Spathoglottis.

== Taxonomy ==
The genus Acanthophippium was first described by Carl Ludwig Blume in 1825. He used the spelling with an "o". Many sources have since spelt the name "Acanthephippium" (i.e. with an "e"). This is regarded as an orthographic variant by the International Plant Names Index. The original spelling is used by sources such as the World Checklist of Selected Plant Families.

=== Species ===
1. Acanthophippium bicolor (S. India, Sri Lanka, New Guinea).
2. Acanthophippium chrysoglossum (W. Sumatra).
3. Acanthophippium curtisii (Borneo - Sarawak).
4. Acanthophippium eburneum (N. Sumatra, Borneo - Sarawak).
5. Acanthophippium gougahensis (Thailand, Vietnam).
6. Acanthophippium javanicum (W. Malaysia, Borneo, Java, Sumatra, New Guinea). (type species; commonly grown)
7. Acanthophippium lilacinum (N. Borneo).
8. Acanthophippium mantinianum (Philippines) (commonly grown)
9. Acanthophippium parviflorum (Vietnam, S. Sumatra to Java).
10. Acanthophippium sinense (China)
11. Acanthophippium splendidum (Sulawesi to SW. Pacific, New Guinea).
12. Acanthophippium striatum (E. Himalaya to Java). (commonly grown)
13. Acanthophippium sylhetense (Sikkim to Philippines)
