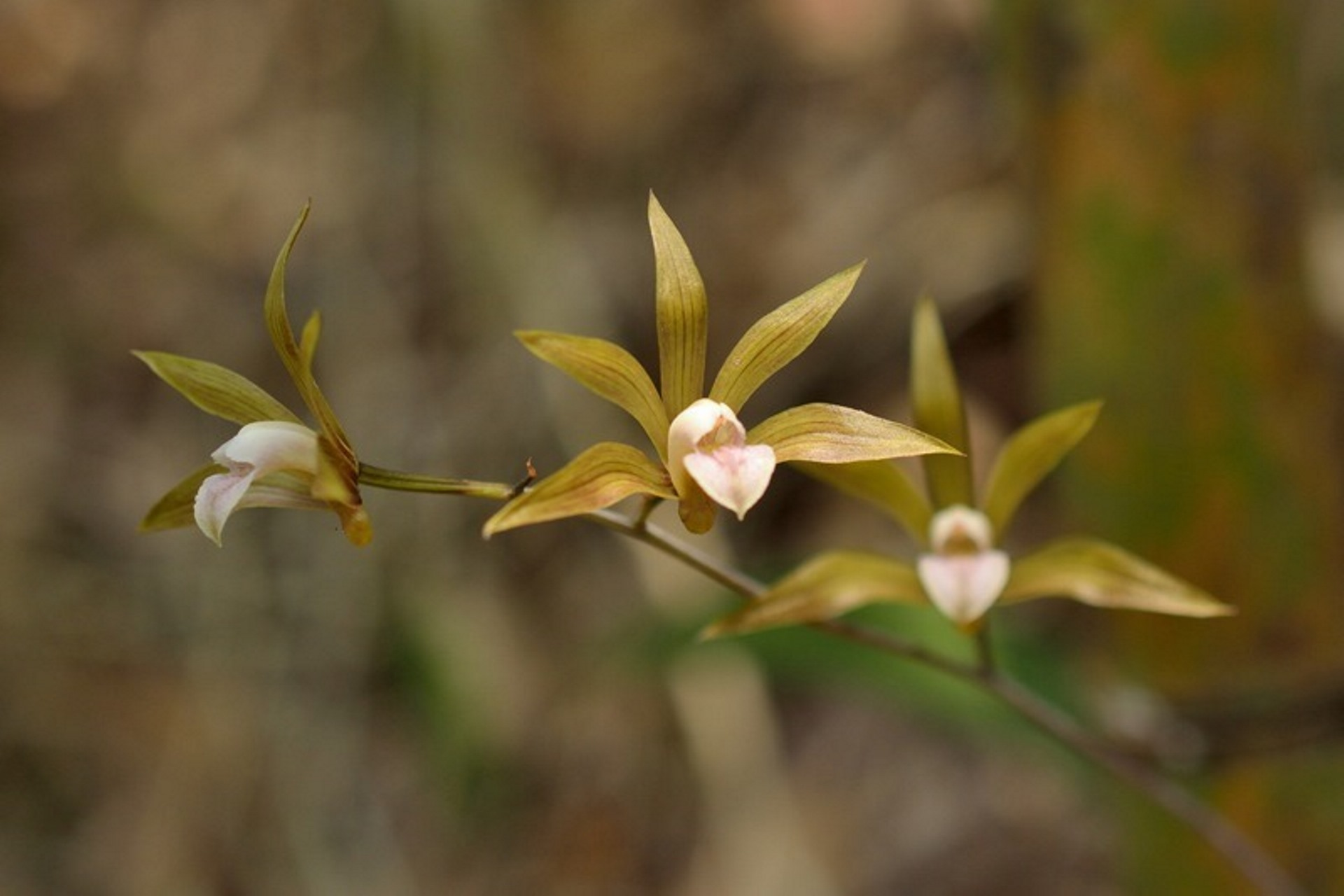
- Ania penangiana

Scientific classification
- Kingdom: Plantae
- Clade: Tracheophytes
- Clade: Angiosperms
- Clade: Monocots
- Order: Asparagales
- Family: Orchidaceae
- Subfamily: Epidendroideae
- Tribe: Collabieae
- Genus: Ania; Lindl.

= Ania (plant) =

Genus of orchids

Ania is a genus of flowering plants from the orchid family Orchidaceae.

== Species ==
Species accepted by the Plants of the World Online as of February 2021:

- Ania angustifolia Lindl.
- Ania elmeri (Ames) A.D.Hawkes ex Senghas
- Ania hongkongensis (Rolfe) Tang & F.T.Wang
- Ania penangiana (Hook.f.) Summerh.
- Ania ruybarrettoi S.Y.Hu & Barretto
- Ania viridifusca (Hook.) Tang & W.T.Wang ex Summerh.

== See also ==
- List of Orchidaceae genera
