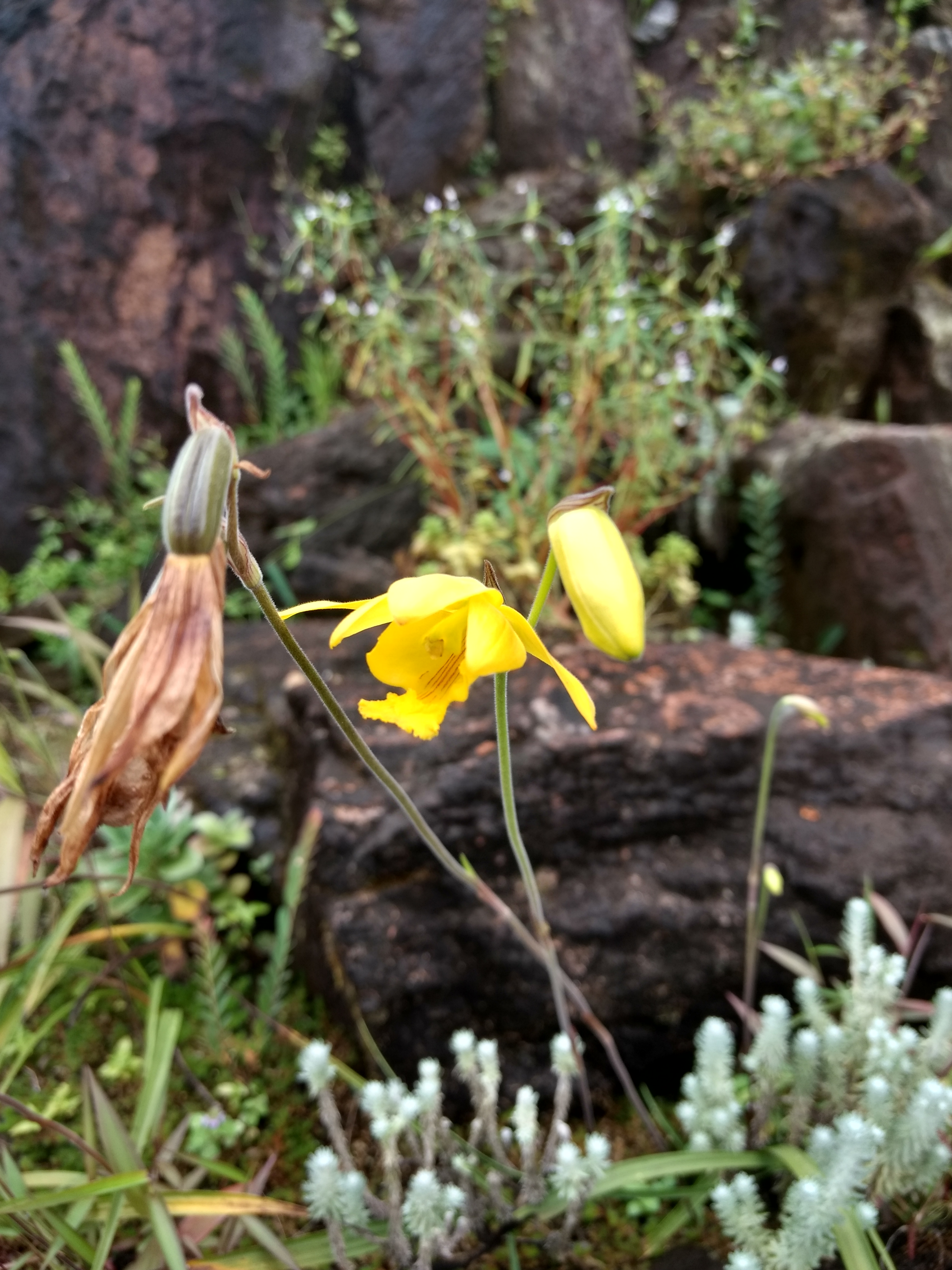

Scientific classification
- Kingdom: Plantae
- Clade: Tracheophytes
- Clade: Angiosperms
- Clade: Monocots
- Order: Asparagales
- Family: Orchidaceae
- Subfamily: Epidendroideae
- Genus: Ipsea
- Species: I. malabarica

Binomial name
- Ipsea malabarica (Reichb.f.) Hook.f.

= Ipsea malabarica =

Species of plant

Ipsea malabarica, the Malabar daffodil orchid, is a species of ground orchids endemic to the high altitude hills of the southern Western Ghats in India. It was not seen in the wild for many years after its description and was rediscovered by K.S. Manilal in 1982 from Silent Valley. It is endangered and attempts have been made to propagate the species through tissue culture to reintroduce them into the wild.
