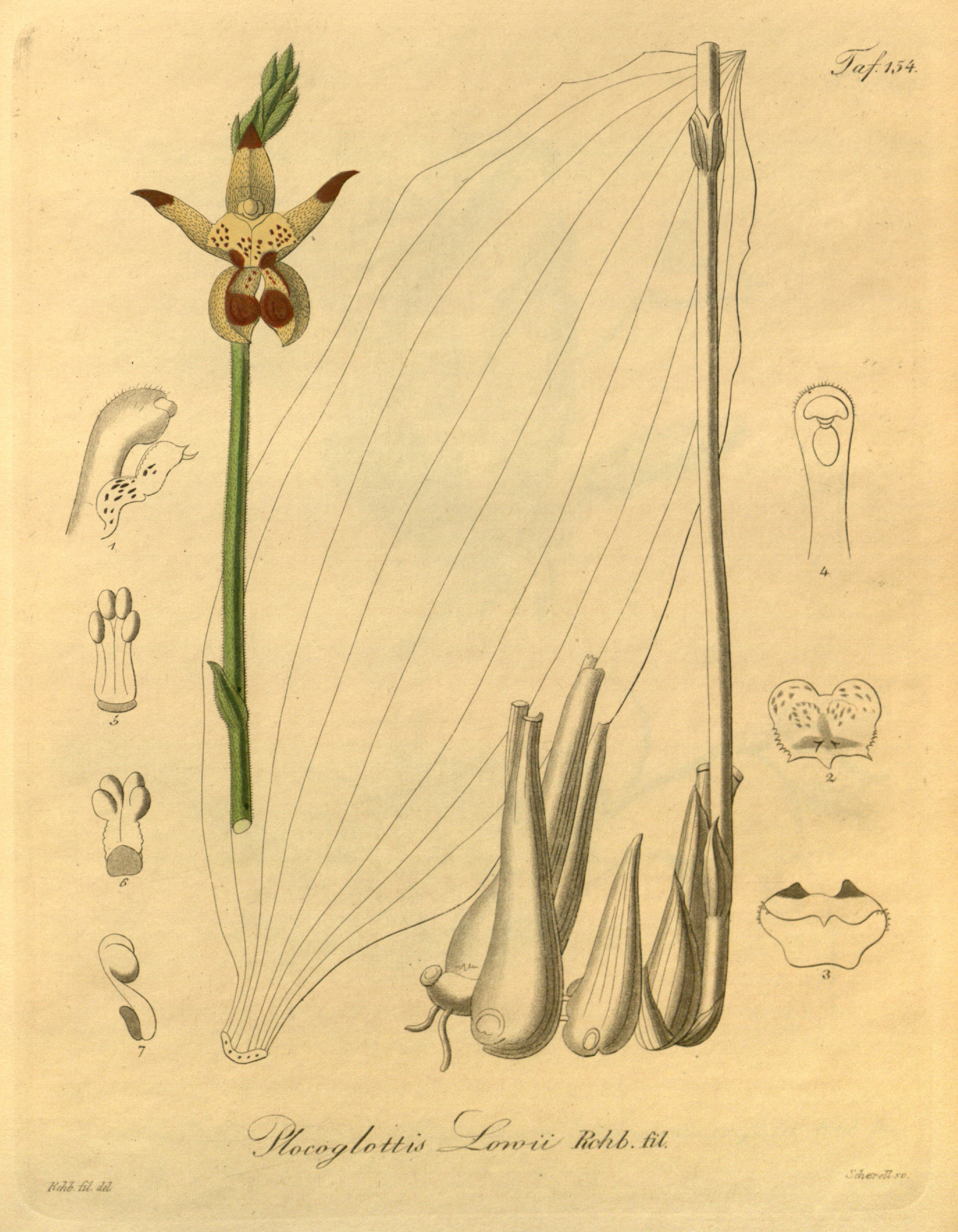
- Plocoglottis lowii 1865 illustration

Scientific classification
- Kingdom: Plantae
- Clade: Tracheophytes
- Clade: Angiosperms
- Clade: Monocots
- Order: Asparagales
- Family: Orchidaceae
- Subfamily: Epidendroideae
- Tribe: Collabieae
- Genus: Plocoglottis; Blume

= Plocoglottis =

Genus of orchids

Plocoglottis is a genus of orchids (family Orchidaceae), native to Southeast Asia and to various islands from the Andaman Islands to the Solomons.

Species accepted as of June 2014:

1. Plocoglottis angulata J.J.Sm. - Borneo
2. Plocoglottis atroviridis Schltr. - New Guinea
3. Plocoglottis bicallosa Ames - Philippines
4. Plocoglottis bicomata L.O.Williams - Luzon
5. Plocoglottis bokorensis (Gagnep.) Seidenf. - Cambodia, Thailand, Vietnam
6. Plocoglottis borneensis Ridl. - Borneo
7. Plocoglottis confertiflora J.J.Sm. - New Guinea
8. Plocoglottis copelandii Ames - Philippines
9. Plocoglottis dilatata Blume - Borneo, Java
10. Plocoglottis gigantea (Hook.f.) J.J.Sm. - Thailand, Malaysia, Borneo, Sumatra
11. Plocoglottis glaucescens Schltr. - New Guinea
12. Plocoglottis hirta Ridl. - Borneo
13. Plocoglottis janowskii J.J.Sm. - New Guinea
14. Plocoglottis javanica Blume - Nicobar Islands, Thailand, Vietnam, Borneo, Java, Malaysia, Sumatra
15. Plocoglottis kaniensis Schltr. - New Guinea, Solomons, Bismarcks
16. Plocoglottis lacuum J.J.Sm. - New Guinea
17. Plocoglottis lancifolia J.J.Sm. - New Guinea
18. Plocoglottis latifrons J.J.Sm. - New Guinea, Solomons
19. Plocoglottis lobulata Schltr. - Sulawesi
20. Plocoglottis loheriana (Kraenzl.) Goebel - Philippines
21. Plocoglottis longicuspis J.J.Sm. - New Guinea
22. Plocoglottis lowii Rchb.f. - Andaman Islands, Thailand, Borneo, Java, Malaysia, Sumatra, Maluku, New Guinea
23. Plocoglottis lucbanensis Ames - Philippines
24. Plocoglottis maculata Schltr. - New Guinea
25. Plocoglottis mamberamensis J.J.Sm. - New Guinea
26. Plocoglottis mindorensis Ames - Philippines
27. Plocoglottis moluccana Blume - Maluku, New Guinea
28. Plocoglottis neohibernica Schltr. in K.M.Schumann & C.A.G.Lauterbach - Bismarcks
29. Plocoglottis parviflora Ridl. - Sarawak
30. Plocoglottis plicata (Roxb.) Ormerod - Borneo, Sumatra, Java, Maluku, Sulawesi, Philippines
31. Plocoglottis pseudomoluccana Schltr. - New Guinea
32. Plocoglottis pubiflora Schltr. in K.M.Schumann & C.A.G.Lauterbach - New Guinea
33. Plocoglottis quadrifolia J.J.Sm. - Thailand, Malaysia, Sumatra
34. Plocoglottis sakiensis Schltr. - New Guinea
35. Plocoglottis seranica J.J.Sm. - Seram
36. Plocoglottis sororia J.J.Sm. - New Guinea
37. Plocoglottis sphingoides J.J.Sm. - New Guinea
38. Plocoglottis striata J.J.Sm. - New Guinea
39. Plocoglottis torana J.J.Sm. - New Guinea, Solomons
40. Plocoglottis torricellensis Schltr. - New Guinea
41. Plocoglottis tropidiifolia J.J.Sm. - New Guinea
