= Hancockia uniflora =

Scientific classification
- Kingdom: Plantae
- Clade: Tracheophytes
- Clade: Angiosperms
- Clade: Monocots
- Order: Asparagales
- Family: Orchidaceae
- Subfamily: Epidendroideae
- Tribe: Collabieae
- Genus: Hancockia; Rolfe
- Species: H. uniflora

Binomial name
- Hancockia uniflora Rolfe

Synonyms
- Chrysoglossella Hatus.; Chrysoglossella japonica Hatus.; Hancockia japonica (Hatus.) Maek.

Genus of orchids

Hancockia is a genus of the orchid family (Orchidaceae). There is only one known species, Hancockia uniflora, native to eastern Asia (Japan including Ryukyu Islands, Vietnam, Yunnan, Taiwan)
