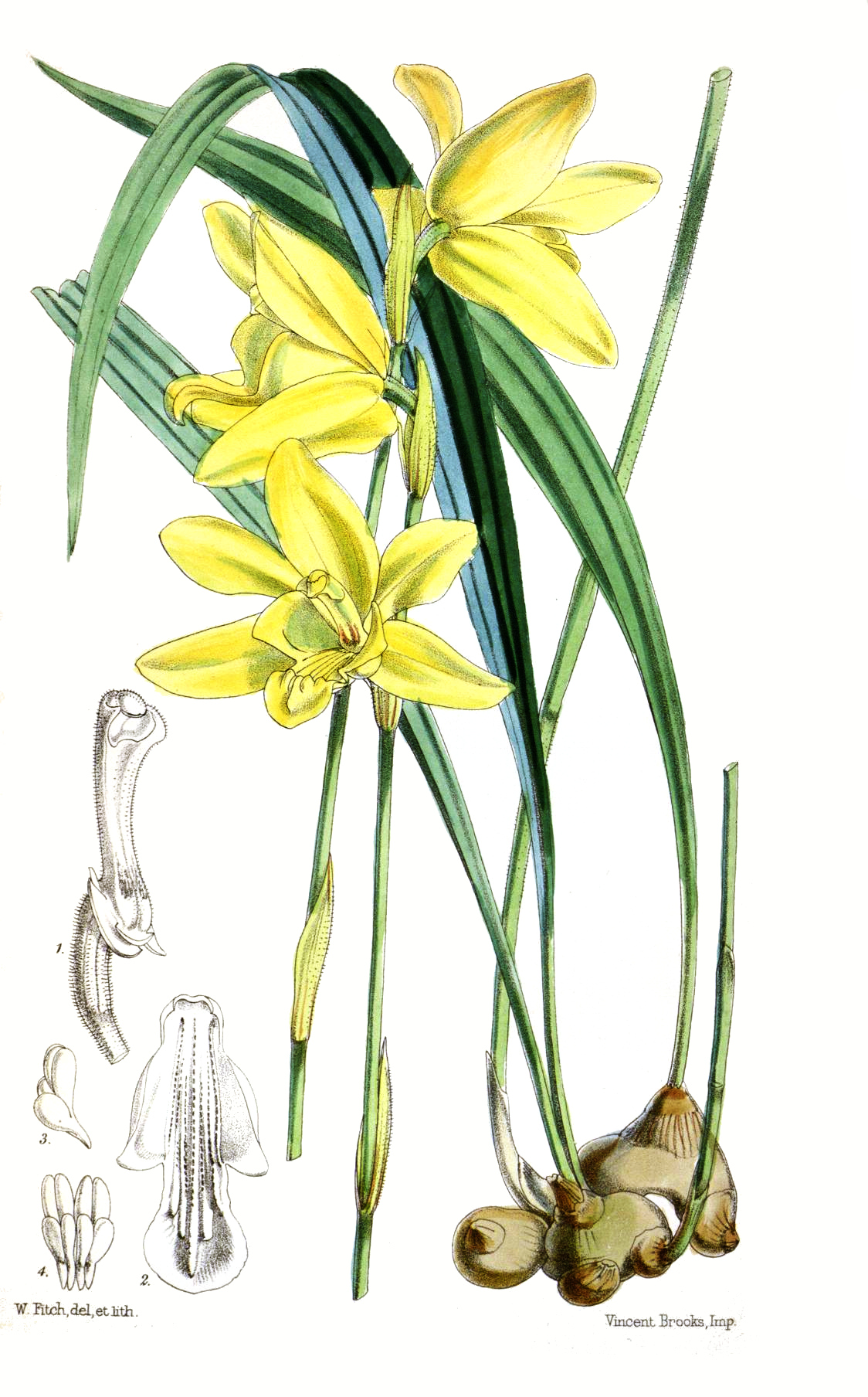
- Ipsea speciosa 1868 illustration

Scientific classification
- Kingdom: Plantae
- Clade: Tracheophytes
- Clade: Angiosperms
- Clade: Monocots
- Order: Asparagales
- Family: Orchidaceae
- Subfamily: Epidendroideae
- Tribe: Collabieae
- Genus: Ipsea; Lindl.

= Ipsea =

Genus of orchids

Ipsea is a genus of the Orchid family (Orchidaceae), with three species that are found in India, Sri Lanka and Thailand.

Three species are recognized:

- Ipsea malabarica (Rchb.f.) Hook.f. - southern India
- Ipsea speciosa Lindl. - Sri Lanka
- Ipsea thailandica Seidenf. - Thailand

The genus was erected by John Lindley in 1831 with the type species I. speciosa which was discovered in Nuwara Eliya, Sri Lanka in 1829 by James Macrae.

A similar species was found by Jerdon and was doubtfully considered as a new species by Robert Wight. This was later described as Ipsea malabarica, restricted to Silent Valley in northern Kerala. This endangered species with a very narrow distribution range grows on steep mountain slopes in moist rocky and sunny areas in association with Tripogon bromoides, T. ananthaswamianus, Eulalia sp., Fimbristylis sp., Utricularia coerulea, Drosera burmanni, Eriocaulon truncatum and other such plants. They flower from October to December.
