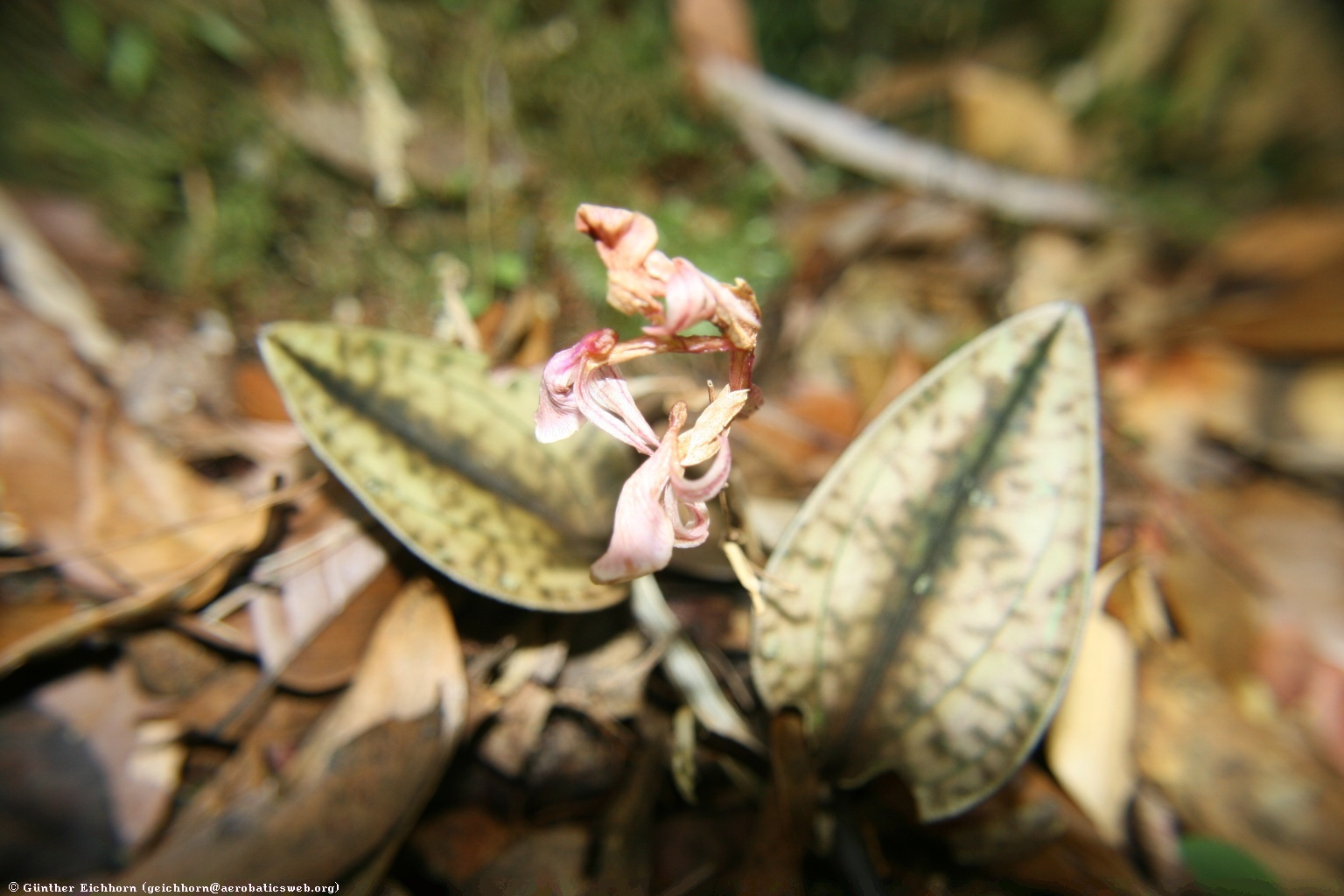

Scientific classification
- Kingdom: Plantae
- Clade: Tracheophytes
- Clade: Angiosperms
- Clade: Monocots
- Order: Asparagales
- Family: Orchidaceae
- Subfamily: Epidendroideae
- Genus: Nephelaphyllum
- Species: N. aureum

Binomial name
- Nephelaphyllum aureum J.J.Wood

= Nephelaphyllum aureum =

Species of orchid

Nephelaphyllum aureum, the leaf litter orchid, is an orchid endemic to Mount Kinabalu, Borneo, Malaysia.

== Distribution ==
Endemic to Borneo.
