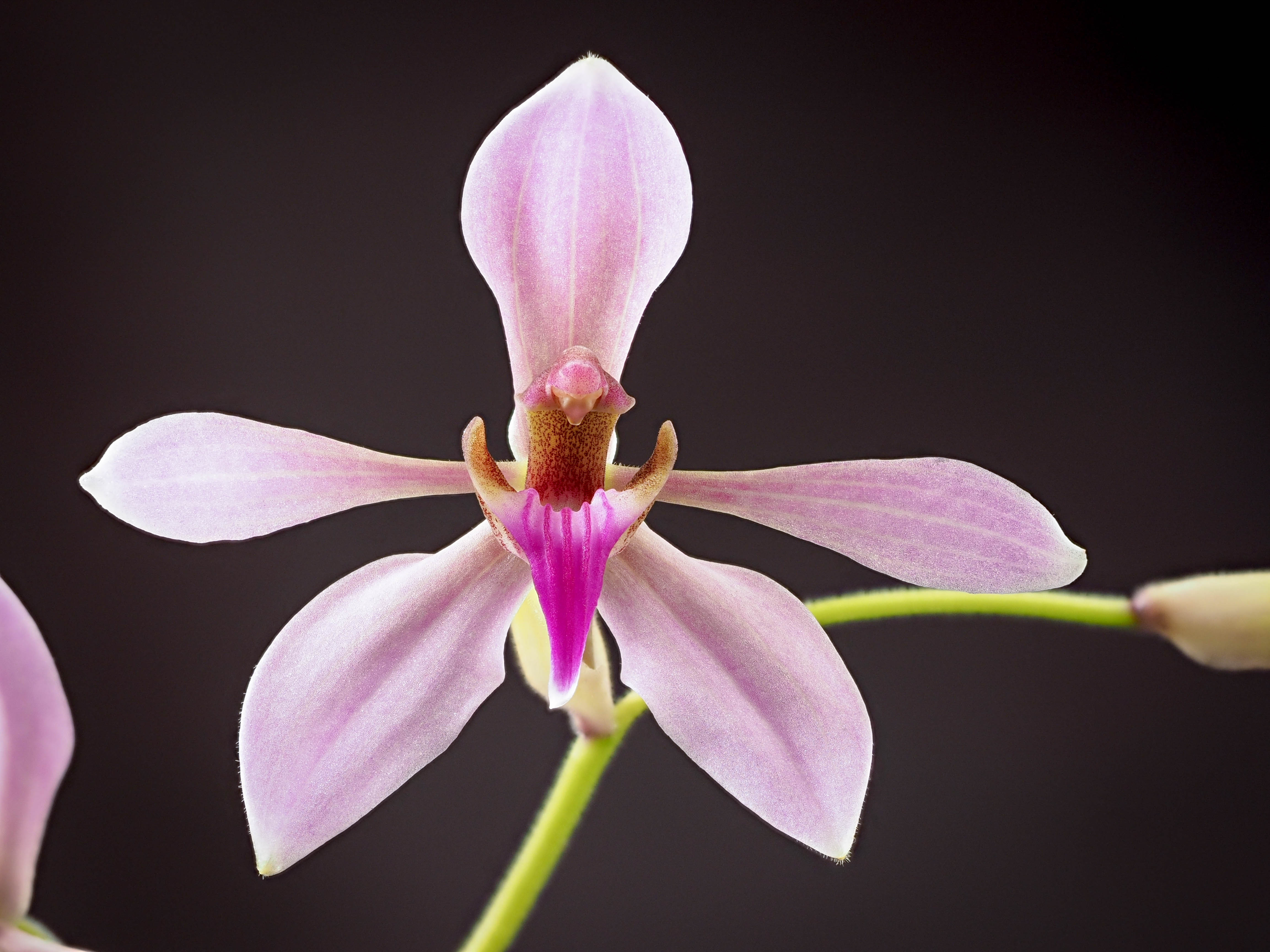
- Ancistrochilus rothschildianus

Scientific classification
- Kingdom: Plantae
- Clade: Tracheophytes
- Clade: Angiosperms
- Clade: Monocots
- Order: Asparagales
- Family: Orchidaceae
- Subfamily: Epidendroideae
- Genus: Ancistrochilus
- Species: A. rothschildianus

Binomial name
- Ancistrochilus rothschildianus J.O'Brien

= Ancistrochilus rothschildianus =

Species of orchid

Ancistrochilus rothschildianus is a small species of semi-terrestrial, orchid endemic to the African tropics. A. rothschildianus is cultivated for its "pretty pink flowers." This species and Ancistrochilus thomsonianus are the only recognized species in genus Ancistrochilus.

== Description ==
Ancistrochilus rothschildianus is a sympodial epiphytic plant with wide, conical or pyriform pseudobulbs that each carry two to three broad, acute, lanceolate leaves. The shape of the pseudobulbs has been described as similar to that of Hershey's Kisses.

A deciduous species from a region with a very pronounced dry season, A. rothschildianus goes into a state of abscission and loses leaves before it comes into flower. At the end or the dry season, the flowers appear from the base of the mature, leafless pseudobulb in a pubescent inflorescence. Each plant produces three to four large (8 cm across), attractive, and showy flowers are that are dusky rose pink in color with a three-lobed lip that is magenta in color and ends in an elongated, narrow, curved projection. The flowers have a mild, spicy fragrance with a hint of a metallic odor.

== Range and habitat ==
Ancistrochilus rothschildianus is endemic to a relatively narrow latitudinal range across tropical Africa encompassing the West African countries of Guinea and Sierra Leone, the East African countries of Uganda and Tanzania, and the territory in between.

This orchid grows on bare tree trunks and larger branches of large forest trees at altitudes of 500-1100m.

== Cultivation ==
In cultivation, this orchid does well in a coarse, well-drained potting medium. After flowering until the appearance of a new lead, the potting medium should be allowed to get dry during so as to encourage the plant to go dormant as it does in the wild. When it loses its leaves and flowers appear, more frequent watering should resume. It benefits from repotting when new growth appears at the start of its growing season. Mature pseudobulbs flower better if provided with plentiful amounts of water and fertilizer.
