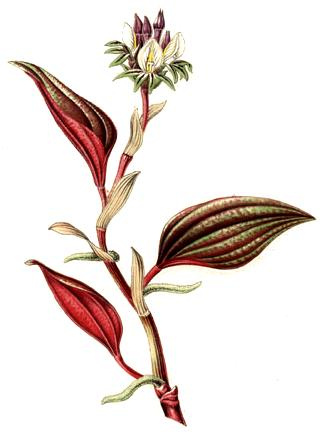
- Nephelaphyllum pulchrum

Scientific classification
- Kingdom: Plantae
- Clade: Tracheophytes
- Clade: Angiosperms
- Clade: Monocots
- Order: Asparagales
- Family: Orchidaceae
- Subfamily: Epidendroideae
- Tribe: Collabieae
- Genus: Nephelaphyllum; Blume, 1825

Synonyms
- Nephelephyllum Blume; Cytheris Lindl.

= Nephelaphyllum =

Genus of orchids

Nephelaphyllum is a genus with 12 species of orchids (family Orchidaceae). Its genus is distributed in southern China, the Himalayas, Indochina, Indonesia, Malaysia and the Philippines.

Species accepted as of June 2014:

1. Nephelaphyllum aureum J.J.Wood in C.L.Chan. & al. - Borneo
2. Nephelaphyllum beccarii Schltr. - Sarawak
3. Nephelaphyllum cordifolium (Lindl.) Blume - Sikkim, India, Bhutan, Bangladesh
4. Nephelaphyllum flabellatum Ames & C.Schweinf. in O.Ames - Sabah
5. Nephelaphyllum gracile Schltr. - Borneo
6. Nephelaphyllum laciniatum J.J.Sm. - Sulawesi
7. Nephelaphyllum mindorense Ames - Philippines
8. Nephelaphyllum pulchrum Blume - Hainan, Indochina, Assam, Bhutan, West Bengal, Sikkim, Andaman Islands, Borneo, Java, Sumatra, Philippines
9. Nephelaphyllum tenuiflorum Blume - Hainan, Hong Kong, Indonesia, Malaysia, Thailand, Vietnam
10. Nephelaphyllum trapoides J.J.Sm. - Borneo
11. Nephelaphyllum verruculosum Carr -Sabah
