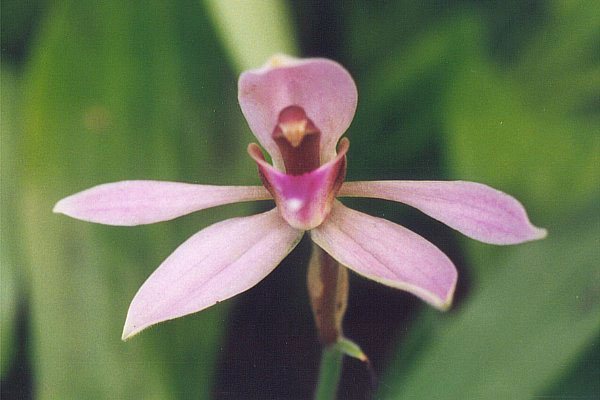
- Ancistrochilus rothschildianus

Scientific classification
- Kingdom: Plantae
- Clade: Tracheophytes
- Clade: Angiosperms
- Clade: Monocots
- Order: Asparagales
- Family: Orchidaceae
- Subfamily: Epidendroideae
- Tribe: Collabieae
- Genus: Ancistrochilus; Rolfe

Type species
- Ancistrochilus thomsonianus

Species
- Ancistrochilus rothschildianus; Ancistrochilus thomsonianus

= Ancistrochilus =

Genus of orchids

Ancistrochilus is a genus of the orchid family (Orchidaceae), comprising only 2 species.

== Description ==
These two species are cool to hot growing orchids, found from tropical West Africa to Tanzania and Uganda. They grow on tree trunks and large branches at elevations between 500 and 1100 m.

These are sympodial epiphytic plants with wide, characteristic conical or pyriform pseudobulbs, carrying two to three broad, acute, lanceolate leaves. These leaves are shed after growth has slowed.

Three to four large and attractive, fragrant flowers, 8 cm across, then appear from the base of the mature leafless pseudobulb in a pubescent inflorescence. The petals and sepals are dark-colored, rose pink. The three-lobed lip is magenta. It ends in an elongated, narrow, curved projection.

== Taxonomy ==
The name is derived from the Greek words ankistron ("hook") and cheilos ("lip"), referring to the form of the lip.

=== Species ===
Image	Name	Distribution	Elevation (m)
	Ancistrochilus rothschildianus O'Brien 1907 : Rotschildt’s Ancistrochilus	W. Trop. Africa to Uganda	500–1,100 metres (1,600–3,600 ft)
	Ancistrochilus thomsonianus (Rchb.f.) Rolfe 1897	S. Nigeria to WC. Trop. Africa	
