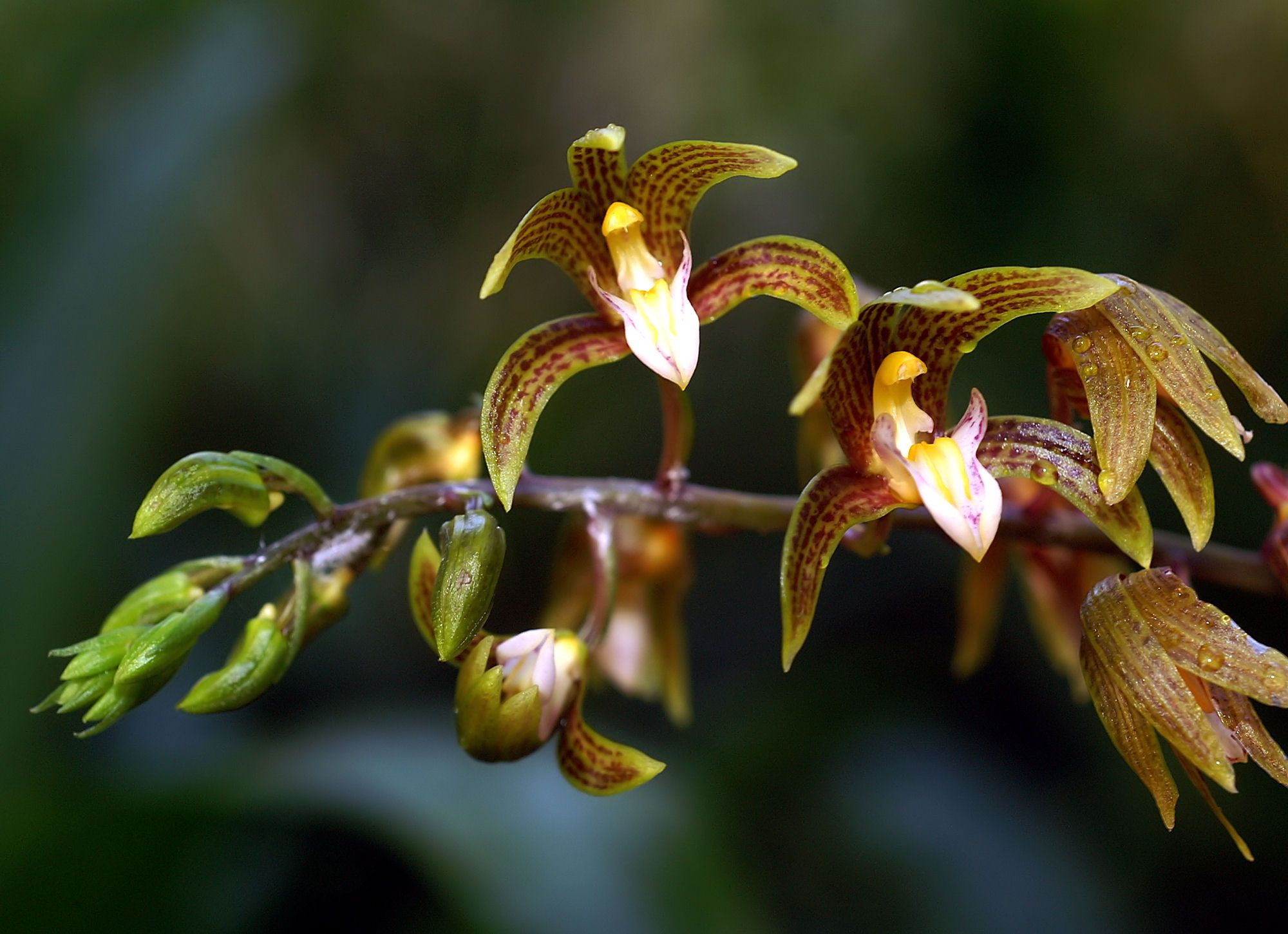
- Chrysoglossum ornatum

Scientific classification
- Kingdom: Plantae
- Clade: Tracheophytes
- Clade: Angiosperms
- Clade: Monocots
- Order: Asparagales
- Family: Orchidaceae
- Subfamily: Epidendroideae
- Tribe: Collabieae
- Genus: Chrysoglossum; Blume

= Chrysoglossum =

Genus of orchids

Chrysoglossum is a genus of flowering plants from the orchid family, Orchidaceae. Its 4 species are native to China, the Indian subcontinent, southeast Asia, New Guinea and some islands of the western Pacific.

- Chrysoglossum assamicum Hook.f.. - Guangxi, Tibet, Assam, Thailand, Vietnam
- Chrysoglossum ensigerum W.Burgh & de Vogel - Sumatra
- Chrysoglossum ornatum Blume - India, Nepal, Assam, Bhutan, Sri Lanka, Cambodia, Thailand, Vietnam, Malaysia, Java, Borneo, Sulawesi, Sumatra, Philippines, New Guinea, Fiji, New Caledonia, Samoa, Vanuatu, China (Guangxi, Hainan, Taiwan, Yunnan)
- Chrysoglossum reticulatum Carr - Sabah, Sarawak

== See also ==
- List of Orchidaceae genera
