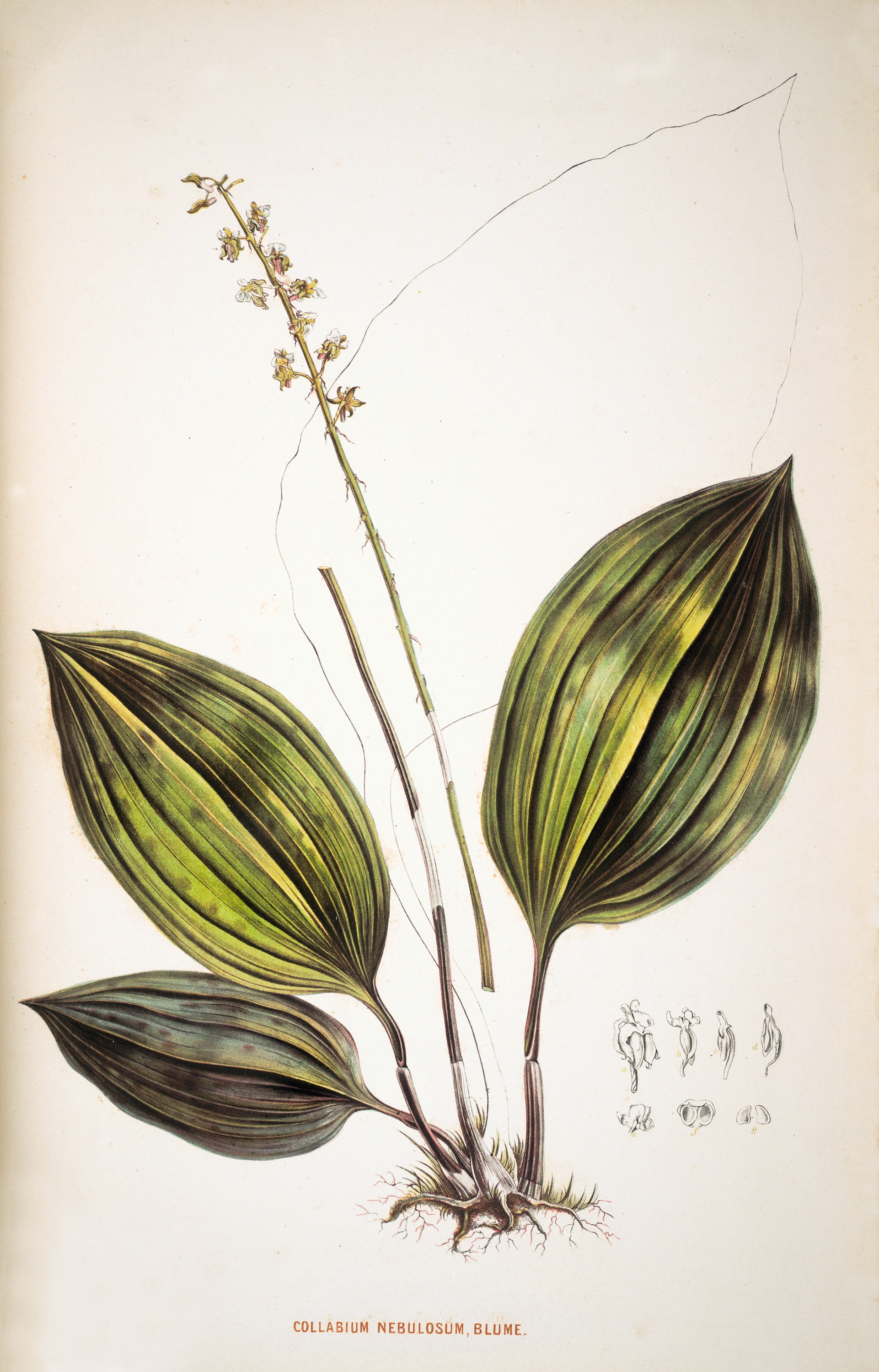
- Collabium nebulosum

Scientific classification
- Kingdom: Plantae
- Clade: Tracheophytes
- Clade: Angiosperms
- Clade: Monocots
- Order: Asparagales
- Family: Orchidaceae
- Subfamily: Epidendroideae
- Tribe: Collabieae
- Genus: Collabium; Blume

Type species
- Collabium nebulosum Blume

Species
- See text

= Collabium =

Genus of orchids

Collabium is a genus of flowering plants in the orchid family, Orchidaceae. Species of Collabium are typically terrestrial and grow under shade in forests. They are distributed in southeast Asia from the Himalayas in India, Burma to China, and to the island groups in Malaysia, the Philippines, the Solomon Islands, Vanuatu, New Caledonia, and Fiji.

== Species ==
Species accepted by the Plants of the World Online as of February 2021:

- Collabium acuticalcar W.Burgh & de Vogel
- Collabium bicameratum (J.J.Sm.) J.J.Wood
- Collabium carinatum de Vogel
- Collabium chapaense (Gagnep.) Seidenf. & Ormerod
- Collabium chinense (Rolfe) Tang & F.T.Wang
- Collabium chloranthum (Gagnep.) Seidenf.
- Collabium delavayi (Gagnep.) Seidenf.
- Collabium evrardii (Gagnep.) Aver.
- Collabium formosanum Hayata
- Collabium nebulosum Blume
- Collabium ovalifolium (Ames & C.Schweinf.) J.J.Wood
- Collabium pumilum (J.J.Sm.) Seidenf.
- Collabium simplex Rchb.f.
- Collabium vesicatum (Rchb.f.) Schltr.
- Collabium yunnanense Ormerod

== See also ==
- List of Orchidaceae genera
