= Acanthophippium sinense =

Conservation status
- Endangered (IUCN 3.1)

Scientific classification
- Kingdom: Plantae
- Clade: Tracheophytes
- Clade: Angiosperms
- Clade: Monocots
- Order: Asparagales
- Family: Orchidaceae
- Subfamily: Epidendroideae
- Genus: Acanthophippium
- Species: A. sinense

Binomial name
- Acanthophippium sinense Rolfe

Species of orchid

Acanthophippium sinense is a species of plant in the family Orchidaceae. It is found in China and Hong Kong.
