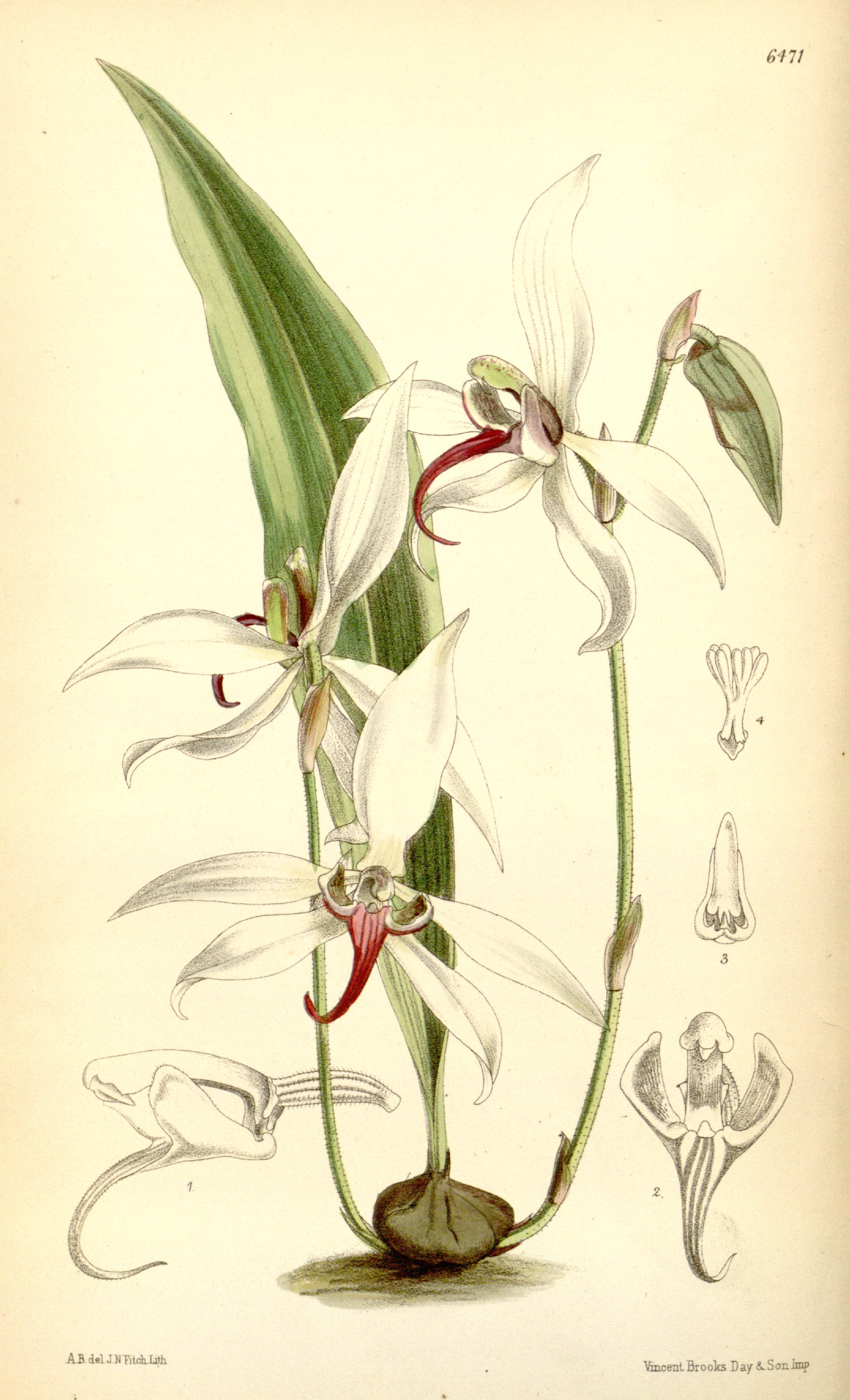
- Ancistrochilus thomsonianus

Scientific classification
- Kingdom: Plantae
- Clade: Tracheophytes
- Clade: Angiosperms
- Clade: Monocots
- Order: Asparagales
- Family: Orchidaceae
- Subfamily: Epidendroideae
- Tribe: Collabieae; Pfitzer Entw. Nat. Anord. Orch.: 100 (1887)

Genera
- Acanthophippium; Ancistrochilus; Ania; Calanthe; Cephalantheropsis; Chrysoglossum; Collabium; Diglyphosa; Eriodes; Gastrorchis; Hancockia; Ipsea; Nephelaphyllum; Pachystoma; Phaius; Pilophyllum; Plocoglottis; Risleya; Spathoglottis; Tainia

= Collabieae =

Tribe of orchids

Collabieae is a tribe of orchids in the subfamily Epidendroideae.

== See also ==
- Taxonomy of the Orchidaceae
