= Acanthophippium splendidum =

Scientific classification
- Kingdom: Plantae
- Clade: Embryophytes
- Clade: Tracheophytes
- Clade: Spermatophytes
- Clade: Angiosperms
- Clade: Monocots
- Order: Asparagales
- Family: Orchidaceae
- Subfamily: Epidendroideae
- Genus: Acanthophippium
- Species: A. splendidum

Binomial name
- Acanthophippium splendidum J.J.Sm.

Species of plant

Acanthophippium splendidum is a species of flowering plant in the family Orchidaceae, native to parts of Malesia (the Maluku Islands and Sulawesi), Papuasia (New Guinea and the Solomon Islands (archipelago)) and islands in the south-western Pacific Ocean (Fiji, New Caledonia, Samoa, Tonga, Vanuatu and Wallis and Futuna). It was first described by Johannes Jacobus Smith in 1933.
