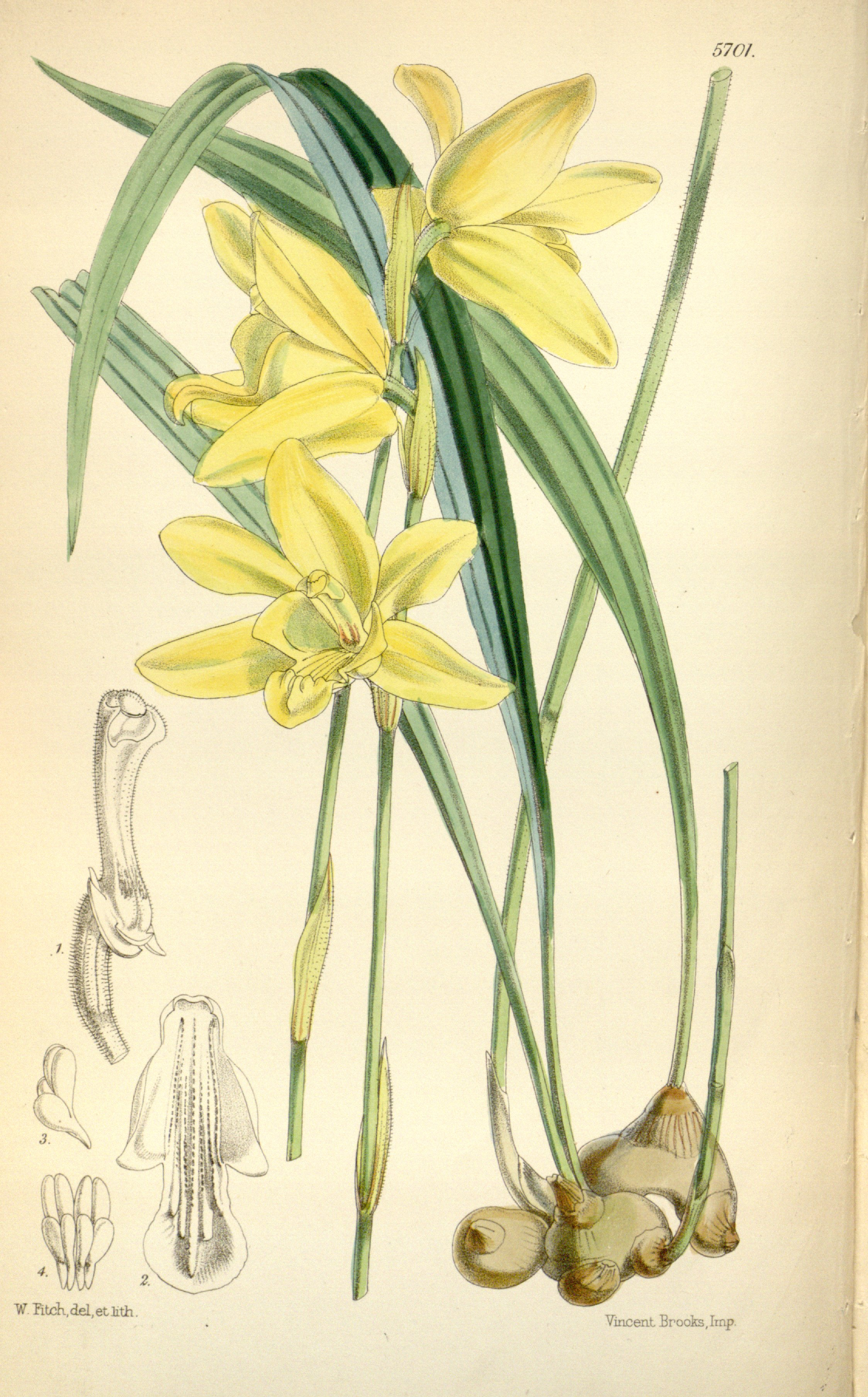
- Ipsea speciosa illustration.

Scientific classification
- Kingdom: Plantae
- Clade: Tracheophytes
- Clade: Angiosperms
- Clade: Monocots
- Order: Asparagales
- Family: Orchidaceae
- Subfamily: Epidendroideae
- Genus: Ipsea
- Species: I. speciosa

Binomial name
- Ipsea speciosa Lindl. (1831)

Synonyms
- Spathoglottis speciosa (Lindl.) Pradhan

= Ipsea speciosa =

Species of orchid

Ipsea speciosa, the daffodil orchid, is a rare wild orchid found only in the hills of Sri Lanka. It is a terrestrial herb with pseudobulbous stem. The lanceolate leaves of the plant are grass like and pointed at the end. Its large flowers appear from September to February, they are bright yellow and sweet-scented.

This plant can be seen in grass lands and pathana areas in mid hills of the country. The plant is known as නගා මැරූ අල in the Sinhala language, meaning "Yam which killed the little sister" according to a folk tale.

Like the glory lily, the daffodil orchid is used as an ingredient in making love charm portions and aphrodisiacs in local medicine.

Ipsea speciosa at a wet patana grassland in Peak Wilderness Sanctuary,Sri Lanka

== Folk tale ==
A young princess walking along the jungle path with her elder brother suddenly attempted to provoke him to make love and have sexual intercourse with her. The prince got extremely angry and killed her instantly.

Later, searching for her unusual behavior, he found that she was innocent and her erotic feeling has aroused due to consuming of a tiny piece of the yam of a plant by mistake. Thereafter this plant, Ipsea speciosa, is known as "the yam which killed the younger sister" among locals.
