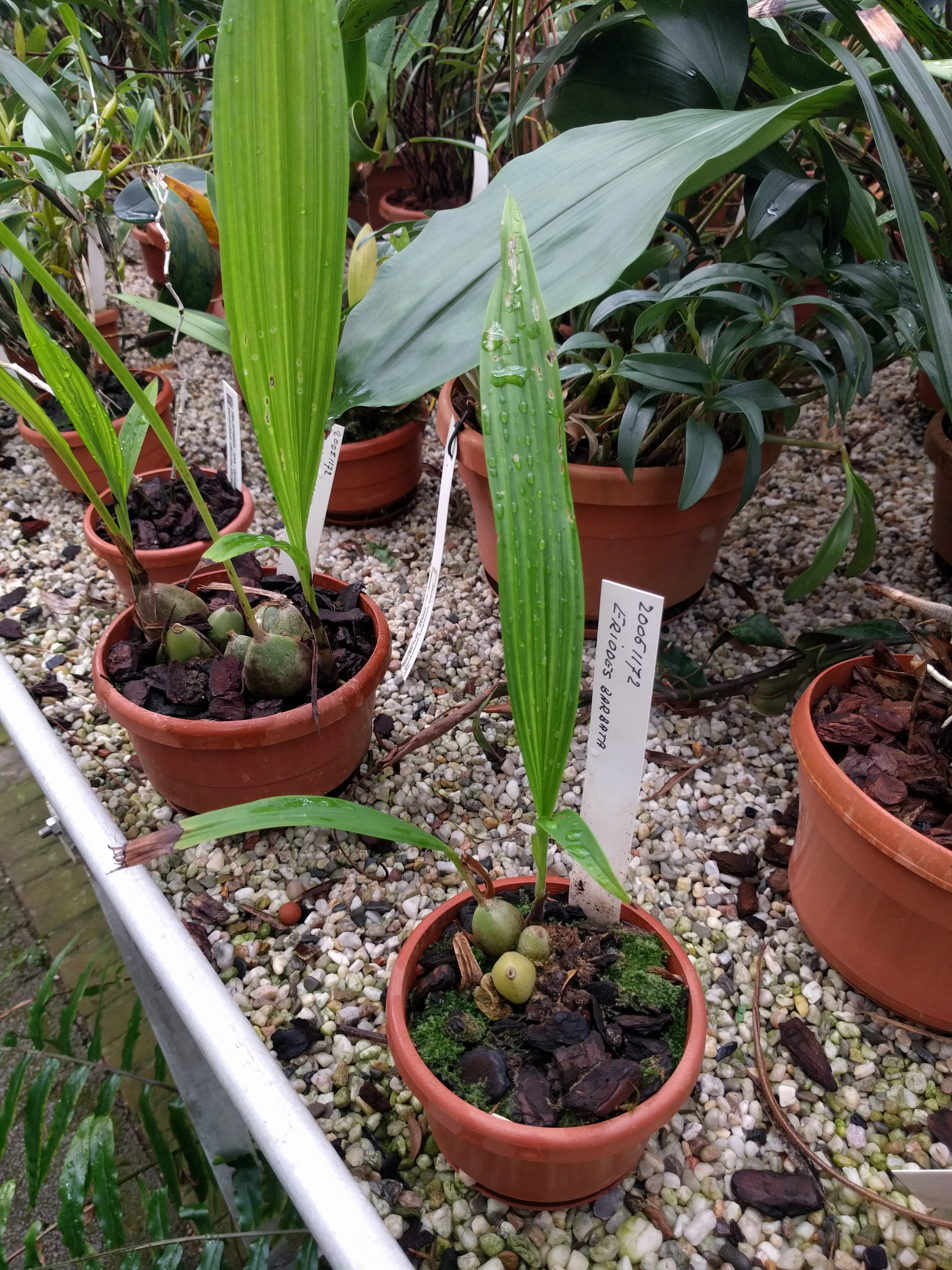

Scientific classification
- Kingdom: Plantae
- Clade: Tracheophytes
- Clade: Angiosperms
- Clade: Monocots
- Order: Asparagales
- Family: Orchidaceae
- Subfamily: Epidendroideae
- Tribe: Collabieae
- Genus: Eriodes; Rolfe
- Species: E. barbata

Binomial name
- Eriodes barbata (Lindl.) Rolfe

Synonyms
- Tainiopsis Schltr., illegitimate name; Neotainiopsis Bennet & Raizada, illegitimate name; Tainia barbata Lindl.; Eria barbata (Lindl.) Rchb.f. in W.G.Walpers; Pinalia barbata (Lindl.) Kuntze; Tainiopsis barbata (Lindl.) Schltr.; Neotainiopsis barbata (Lindl.) Bennet & Raizada; Coelogyne nigrofurfuracea Guillaumin

= Eriodes =

Genus of orchids

Eriodes is a genus of orchids found in Asia. It is monotypic, being represented by the single species Eriodes barbata.

It is native to Southeast Asia, in China (Yunnan), Bhutan, India (Assam), Myanmar, Thailand and Vietnam.
