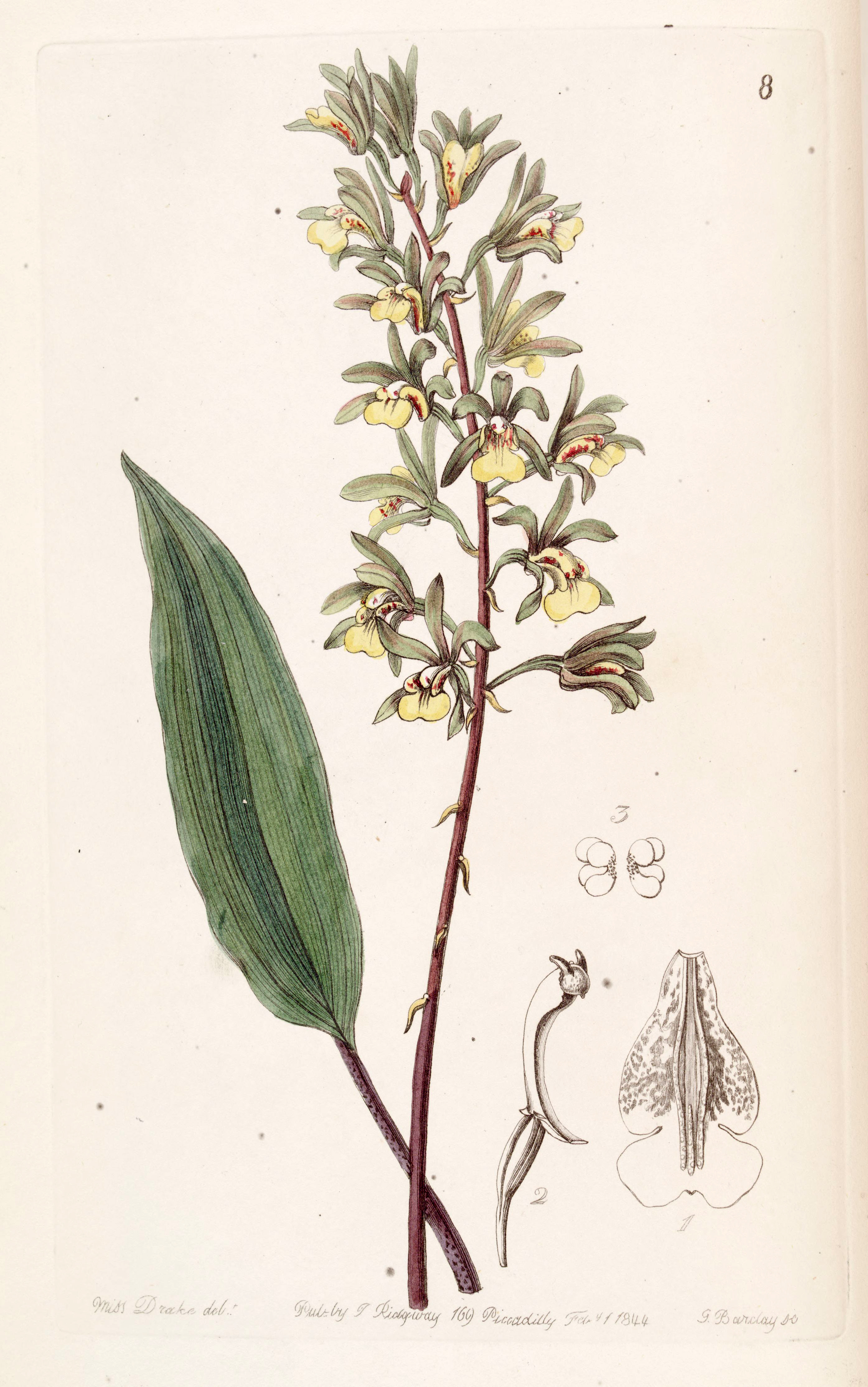
- Illustration of T. bicornis (as Ania bicornis) by Sarah Drake

Scientific classification
- Kingdom: Plantae
- Clade: Tracheophytes
- Clade: Angiosperms
- Clade: Monocots
- Order: Asparagales
- Family: Orchidaceae
- Subfamily: Epidendroideae
- Tribe: Collabieae
- Genus: Tainia; Blume

Type species
- Tainia speciosa Blume

Synonyms
- Mitopetalum Blume; Mischobulbum Schltr.

= Tainia =

Genus of orchids

Tainia, commonly known as ribbon orchids or 带唇兰属 (dai chun lan shu) is a genus of about thirty species of evergreen, terrestrial orchids in the (family Orchidaceae) distributed from India, China, Japan, Southeast Asia to New Guinea, the Solomon Islands and Queensland.

== Description ==
Orchids in the genus Tainia are evergreen, terrestrial herbaceous plants with upright, crowded, thin fleshy pseudobulbs. Each pseudobulb has a single, smooth or pleated leaf. The flower stalk emerges from the pseudobulb on the top of a leafless shoot and bears resupinate yellowish, brownish, red or purple small to moderately large flowers. The sepals and petals are similar in size and shape to each other and several flowers open simultaneously. The labellum is sometimes lobed but always has prominent ridges on its upper surface.

== Taxonomy and naming ==
The genus Tainia was first formally described in 1825 by Carl Ludwig Blume who published the description in Bijdragen tot de flora van Nederlandsch Indië. The name Tainia is an Ancient Greek word meaning "ribbon", "fillet", "band" or "stripe" but Blume's reason for giving this name is not known.

=== Species list ===
The following is a list of the species of Tainia currently accepted by Plants of the World Online as of November 2023:

- Tainia acuminata Aver.
- Tainia bicornis (Lindl.) Rchb.f.
- Tainia cordifolia Hook.f. - Vietnam, Taiwan, Fujian, Guangdong, Guangxi, Yunnan
- Tainia cornuta Aver.
- Tainia crassa (H.Turner) J.J.Wood & A.L.Lamb - Peninsular Malaysia
- Tainia dunnii Rolfe - Fujian, Guangdong, Guangxi, Guizhou, Hainan, Hunan, Jiangxi, Sichuan, Taiwan, Zhejiang
  - Tainia dunnii var. caterva (T.P.Lin & W.M.Lin) T.P.Lin
- Tainia elliptica Fukuy
- Tainia hohuanshanensis S.S.Ying - Taiwan
- Tainia hualienia S.S.Ying - Taiwan
- Tainia latifolia (Lindl.) Rchb.f. - Assam, Bangladesh, India, Bhutan, Laos, Myanmar, Thailand, Vietnam, Borneo, Java, Sumatra, Hainan, Taiwan, Yunnan
  - Tainia latifolia subsp. elongata (J.J.Sm.) H.Turner - Sumatra, Java, Borneo
  - Tainia latifolia subsp. latifolia - Assam, Bangladesh, India, Bhutan, Laos, Myanmar, Thailand, Vietnam, Hainan, Taiwan, Yunnan
  - Tainia latifolia subsp. subintegra P.O'Byrne - Assam, Bangladesh, India, Bhutan, Laos, Myanmar, Thailand, Vietnam, Hainan, Taiwan, Yunnan
- Tainia laxiflora Makino - Japan, Taiwan, Izu-shoto, Nansei-shoto (Ryukyu Islands)
- Tainia longiscapa (Seidenf.) J.J.Wood & A.L.Lamb - Yunnan, Thailand, Vietnam, Hainan
- Tainia macrantha Hook.f. - Guangxi, Guangdong, Vietnam
- Tainia maingayi Hook.f. - Java, Borneo, Malaysia, Sumatra
- Tainia marmorata (J.J.Sm.) J.J.Wood & A.L.Lamb - Sulawesi
- Tainia megalantha (Tang & F.T.Wang) ined. - India, Bhutan, Assam
- Tainia minor Hook.f. - Assam, India, Nepal, Bhutan, Myanmar, Yunnan, Tibet
- Tainia obpandurata H.Turner - Sumatra, Borneo
- Tainia papuana J.J.Sm. - New Guinea, Solomons
- Tainia paucifolia (Breda) J.J.Sm. - Thailand, Vietnam, Borneo, Malaysia, Java, Sumatra
- Tainia ponggolensis (A.L.Lamb ex H.Turner) J.J.Wood & A.L.Lamb - Sabah
- Tainia purpureifolia Carr - Borneo
- Tainia scapigera (Hook.f.) J.J.Sm. - Borneo
- Tainia serratiloba Ormerod - western New Guinea
- Tainia simondii (Seidenf. ex Aver.) ined. - Vietnam
- Tainia speciosa Blume - Thailand, Malaysia, Borneo, Java, Sumatra
- Tainia trinervis Blume Rchb.f. - Maluku, New Guinea, Solomons, Queensland
- Tainia vegetissima Ridl. - Malaysia, Borneo
- Tainia wrayana (Hook.f.) J.J.Sm. - Sikkim, Bhutan, Assam, Thailand, Vietnam, Malaysia, Sumatra

== Distribution and habitat ==
Orchids in the genus Tainia grow in high rainfall, shady forests. They are found in Sri Lanka, India and Japan, then south from Myanmar to New Guinea, Australia and some Pacific Islands. Thirteen species, of which two are endemic are found in China. The only Australian species, T. trinervis also occurs in New Guinea and some Pacific Islands.
