= Tainia trinervis =

Ribbon orchid

Scientific classification
- Kingdom: Plantae
- Clade: Tracheophytes
- Clade: Angiosperms
- Clade: Monocots
- Order: Asparagales
- Family: Orchidaceae
- Subfamily: Epidendroideae
- Genus: Tainia
- Species: T. trinervis

Binomial name
- Tainia trinervis (Blume) Rchb.f.

Synonyms
- Mitopetalum trinerve Blume; Dendrobium paucifolium Reinw. ex Blume; Mitopetalum plicatum Blume; Mitopetalum parviflorum Blume; Mitopetalum rubescens Blume; Mitopetalum trinervium Blume; Tainia parviflora (Blume) Schltr.

Species of orchid

Tainia trinervis, commonly known as the ribbon orchid, is an evergreen, terrestrial plant with crowded pseudobulbs, each with a single smooth, shiny leaf and up to fourteen greenish to yellowish flowers with red or purplish stripes in the middle. It is found in tropical Southeast Asia, New Guinea and northern Australia.

== Description ==
Tainia trinervis is an evergreen, terrestrial herb that has thin, crowded, dark green pseudobulbs. Each pseudobulb is 40–70 mm (2–3 in) long and 7–10 mm (0.3–0.4 in) wide and has a single smooth, shiny, dark green leaf 100–160 mm (4–6 in) long and 40–60 mm (1.6–2.4 in) wide on a stalk 30–50 mm (1–2 in) long. Between three and fourteen greenish white to yellowish resupinate flowers 13–18 mm (0.5–0.7 in) long and 20–25 mm (0.8–1 in) wide are well-spaced along a thin flowering stem 200–300 mm (8–10 in) tall. The sepals are 9–12 mm (0.4–0.5 in) long and 3–4 mm (0.12–0.16 in) wide with their tips curved back. The petals are a similar size to the sepals but project forwards. The labellum is 7–8 mm (0.28–0.31 in) long and 5–6 mm (0.20–0.24 in) wide and has three lobes. The middle lobe has three purple ridges and a curved tip. The side lobes curve upwards. Flowering occurs from September to November.

== Taxonomy and naming ==
The ribbon orchid was first formally described in 1856 by Carl Ludwig Blume who gave it the name Mitopetalum trinerve and published the description in Museum Botanicum Lugduno-Batavum sive stirpium Exoticarum, Novarum vel Minus Cognitarum ex Vivis aut Siccis Brevis Expositio et Descriptio. In 1857, Heinrich Gustav Reichenbach changed the name to Tainia trinervis. The specific epithet (trinervis) is derived from the Latin prefix tri- meaning three and nervus meaning "vein".

== Distribution and habitat ==
Tainia trinervis grows in rainforest close to streams in tropical far north Queensland, New Guinea and the Maluku Islands.
