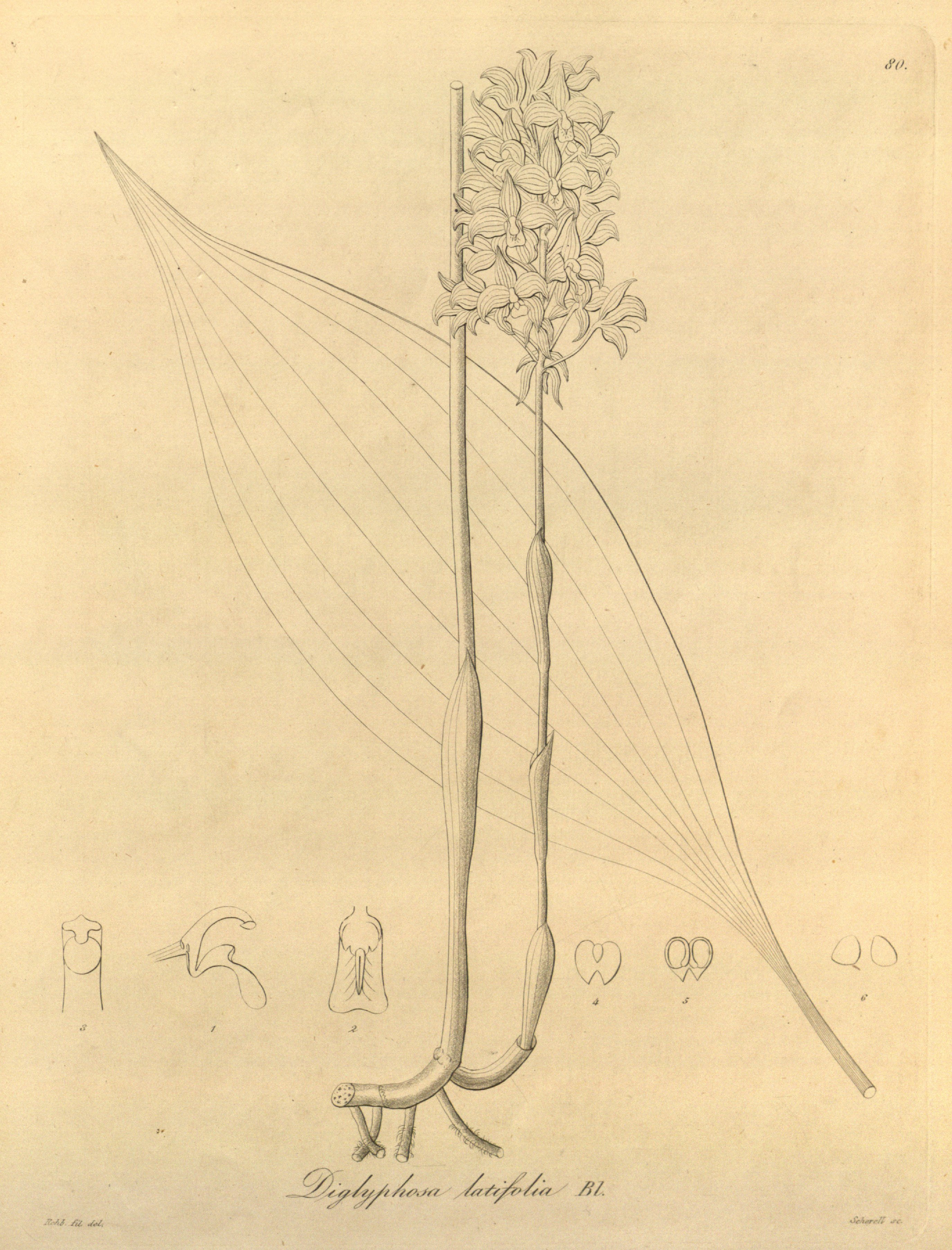

Scientific classification
- Kingdom: Plantae
- Clade: Tracheophytes
- Clade: Angiosperms
- Clade: Monocots
- Order: Asparagales
- Family: Orchidaceae
- Subfamily: Epidendroideae
- Tribe: Collabieae
- Genus: Diglyphosa; Blume

Type species
- Diglyphosa latifolia Blume

= Diglyphosa =

Genus of orchids

Diglyphosa is a genus of flowering plants from the orchid family, Orchidaceae. It contains 3 known species, native to Southeast Asia, the eastern Himalayas, and New Guinea.

- Diglyphosa celebica (Schltr.) Schltr. - Sulawesi
- Diglyphosa elmeri Ames - Mindanao
- Diglyphosa latifolia Blume - Yunnan, Assam, Bhutan, Malaysia, Borneo, Sumatra, Java, Maluku, Philippines, Sulawesi, New Guinea

== See also ==
- List of Orchidaceae genera
