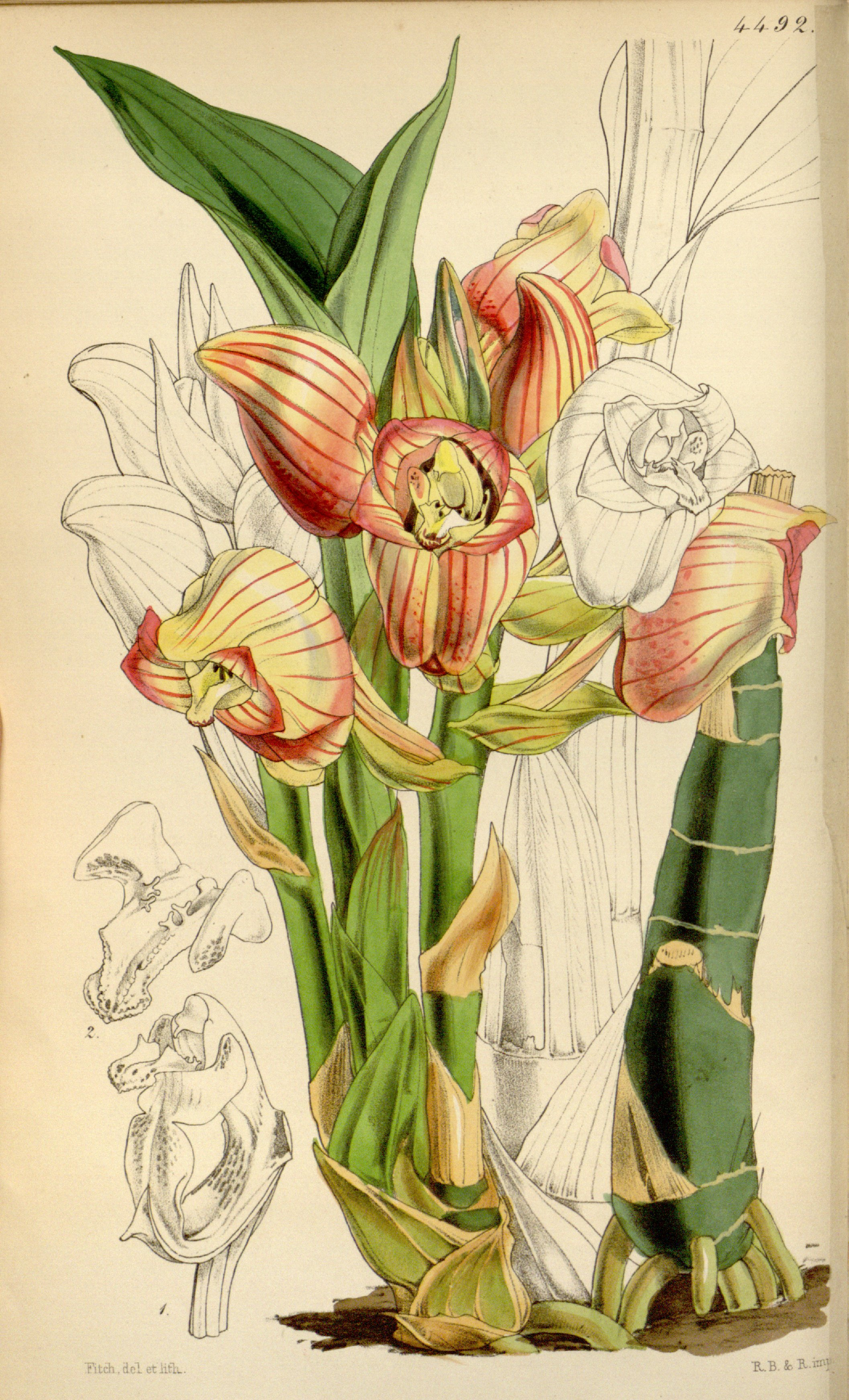

Scientific classification
- Kingdom: Plantae
- Clade: Tracheophytes
- Clade: Angiosperms
- Clade: Monocots
- Order: Asparagales
- Family: Orchidaceae
- Subfamily: Epidendroideae
- Genus: Acanthophippium
- Species: A. javanicum

Binomial name
- Acanthophippium javanicum Blume

= Acanthophippium javanicum =

Species of orchid

Acanthophippium javanicum is a species of orchid and the type species of its genus. It is found in West Malaysia, Borneo, Java, Sumatra and New Guinea.
