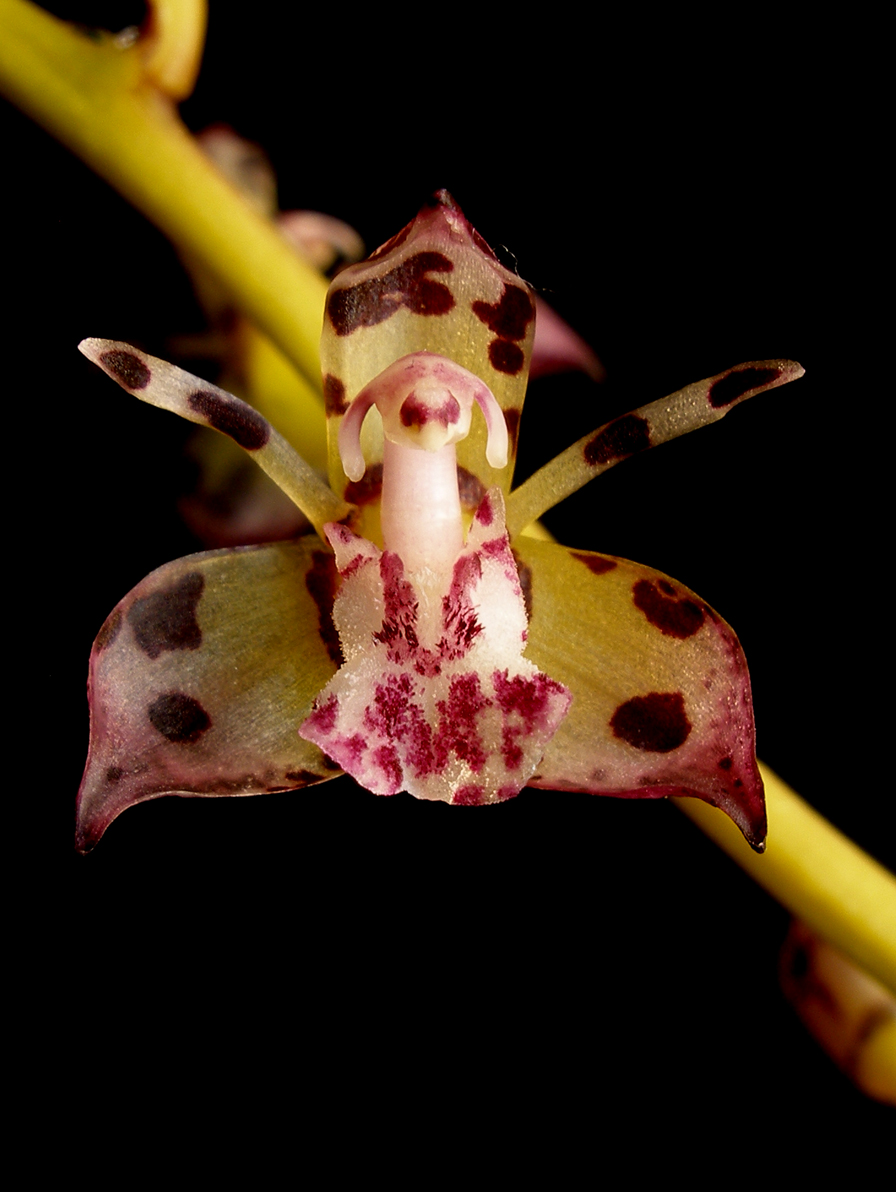

Scientific classification
- Kingdom: Plantae
- Clade: Tracheophytes
- Clade: Angiosperms
- Clade: Monocots
- Order: Asparagales
- Family: Orchidaceae
- Subfamily: Epidendroideae
- Tribe: Cymbidieae
- Subtribe: Cymbidiinae
- Genus: Thecostele; Rchb.f.
- Species: T. alata

Binomial name
- Thecostele alata (Roxb.) C.S.P.Parish & Rchb.f.

Synonyms
- Cymbidium alatum Roxb.; Thecostele zollingeri Rchb.f.; Collabium wrayi Hook.f.; Thecostele maculosa Ridl.; Pholidota elmeri Ames; Thecostele wrayi (Hook.f.) Rolfe; Thecostele elmeri (Ames) Ames; Thecostele poilanei Gagnep.; Collabium annamense Gagnep.

= Thecostele =

Genus of orchids

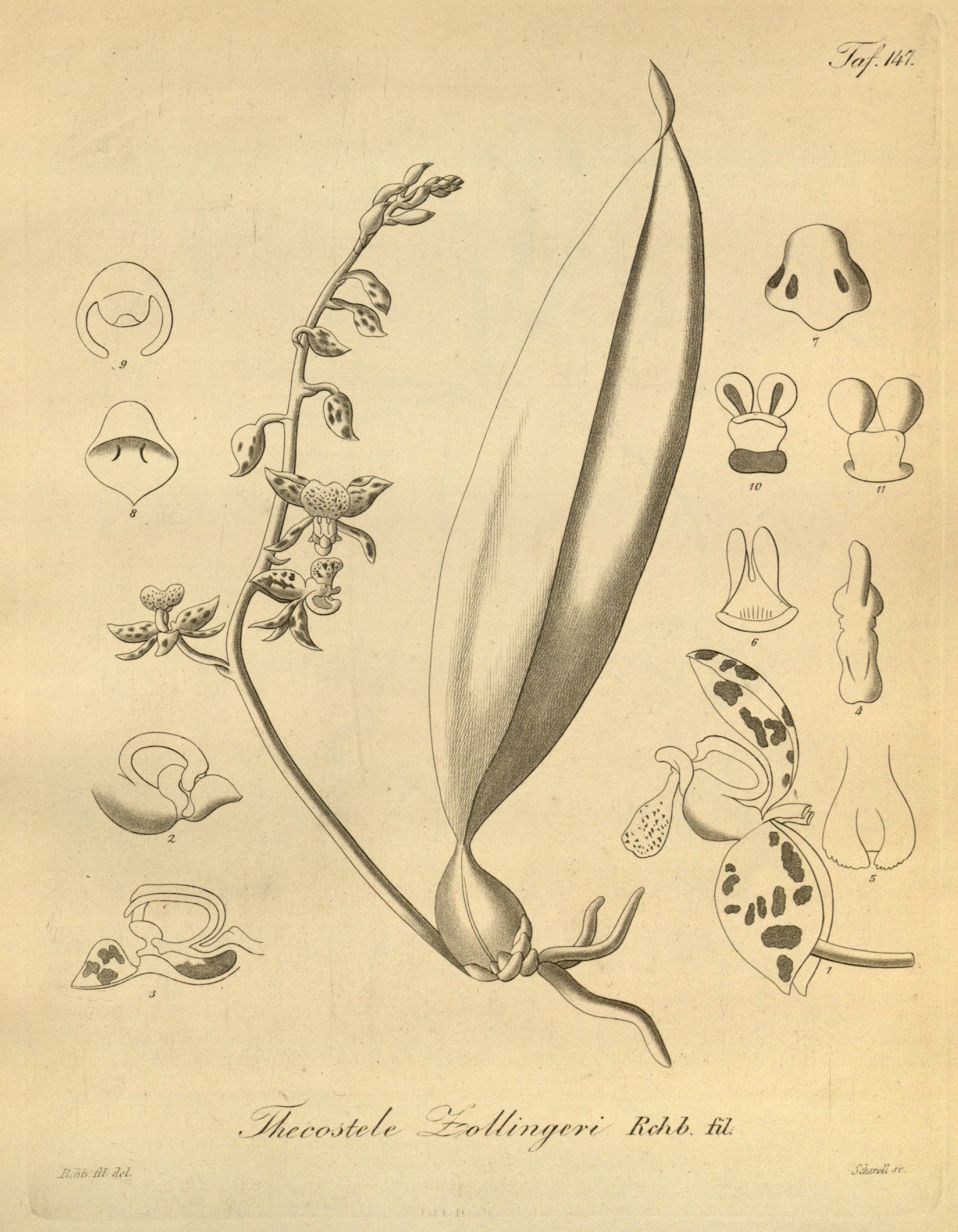
Plate 147 from H. G. Reichenbach (1874), Thecostele zollingeri - vol. 2

Thecostele is a monotypic genus of orchids (family Orchidaceae) and of subtribe Cymbidiinae.

== Taxonomy ==
The only species in the genus is Thecostele alata, first described as Cymbidium alatum by the Scottish botanist William Roxburgh in 1832. It was transferred to the genus Thecostele in 1874 by the English botanist Charles Samuel Pollock Parish and the German botanist Heinrich Gustav Reichenbach. It is native to tropical Asia and is found in northeastern India, Bangladesh, Myanmar, Thailand, Cambodia, Laos, Vietnam, Malaysia, Indonesia, and the Philippines. Two species formerly recognized in this genus (T. secunda and T. maingayi) were transferred to the new genus Thecopus by the Danish botanist Gunnar Seidenfaden in 1983, a decision supported by the number of pollinia and shape of the column.
