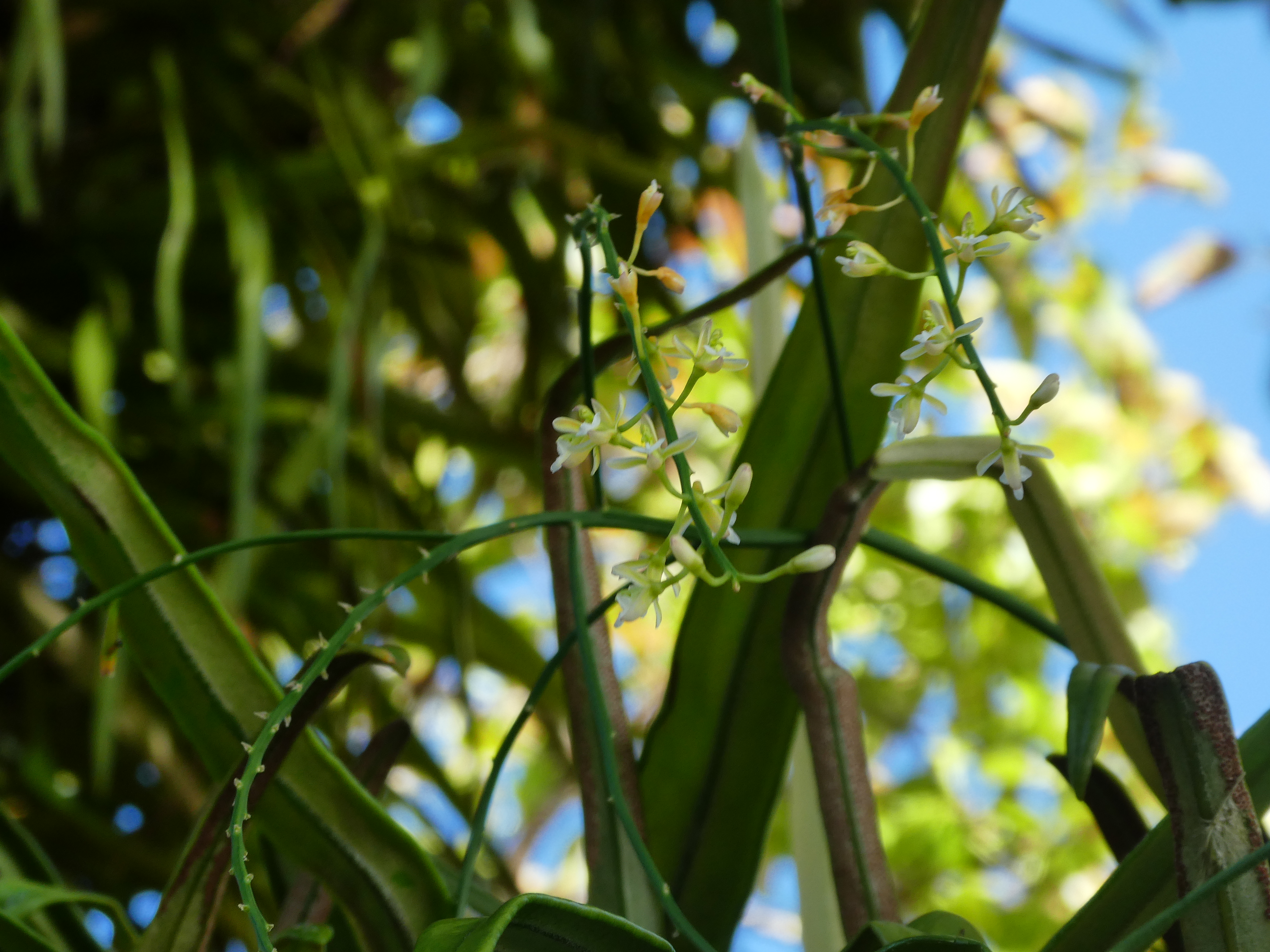

Conservation status
- Vulnerable (EPBC Act)
- Vulnerable (NCA)

Scientific classification
- Kingdom: Plantae
- Clade: Tracheophytes
- Clade: Angiosperms
- Clade: Monocots
- Order: Asparagales
- Family: Orchidaceae
- Subfamily: Epidendroideae
- Genus: Acriopsis
- Species: A. emarginata

Binomial name
- Acriopsis emarginata D.L.Jones & M.A.Clem.

= Acriopsis emarginata =

Pale chandelier orchid

Species of orchid

Acriopsis emarginata, commonly known as pale chandelier orchid, is a species of orchid endemic to Queensland. It is a clump-forming epiphyte with dark green leaves and curved, branching flower stems with many white and cream-coloured flowers.

== Description ==
Acriopsis emarginata is an epiphyte which forms dense clumps with the pseudobulbs surrounded by thin white roots. The pseudobulbs are pale green and onion-like, 30–70 mm (1–3 in) long and 30–40 mm (1–2 in) wide. There are between two and four dark green, leathery, narrow egg-shaped leaves which are 150–200 mm (6–8 in) long and 20–25 mm (0.8–1 in) wide. Wiry, branching flower stems 200–600 mm (8–20 in) long bear large numbers of cream-coloured to pinkish flowers which are 4–5 mm (0.16–0.20 in) wide and have a white, three-lobed, triangular labellum. Each flower has a thread-like pedicel 4–5 mm (0.16–0.20 in) long. The dorsal sepal is linear to oblong, 4–5 mm (0.16–0.20 in) long, about 1 mm (0.04 in) wide and the lateral sepals are fused to form a boat shape 4–5 mm (0.16–0.20 in) long, about 1.5 mm (0.06 in) wide below the labellum. The petals are linear to egg-shaped with similar dimensions to the lateral sepals. The labellum is 4.5 mm (0.2 in) long, about 4 mm (0.2 in) wide and has three lobes. The lateral lobes are broadly triangular and the middle lobe is short with two prominent calli. Flowering mainly occurs from June to November.

== Taxonomy and naming ==
Acriopsis emarginata was first formally described in 2006 by David Jones and Mark Clements from a specimen collected in the Daintree River valley and the description was published in Australian Orchid Research. The genus name is derived from the Ancient Greek words akris meaning "grasshopper" and opsis meaning "appearance" or "aspect", referring to the grasshopper-like appearance of the column. The specific epithet (emarginata) is a Latin word meaning "notched at the apex", referring to the notch on the labellum callus.

This species was formerly included with Acriopsis javanica but Australian plants are more robust with larger pseudobulbs and leaves and more highly branched flowering stems.

== Distribution and habitat ==
Pale chandelier orchid is widespread and common in tropical Queensland from Cape York to the Daintree River. It grows near the crown of trees, palms and Pandanus.

== Conservation status ==
Acriopsis emarginata is listed as "vulnerable" under the Australian Government Environment Protection and Biodiversity Conservation Act 1999 and the Queensland Government Nature Conservation Act 1992.

== Use in horticulture ==
Easy to grow, but needs water all year round, high humidity, and warmth (not below 10 °C). Can be grown on a slab or in a small pot with a coarse mix.
