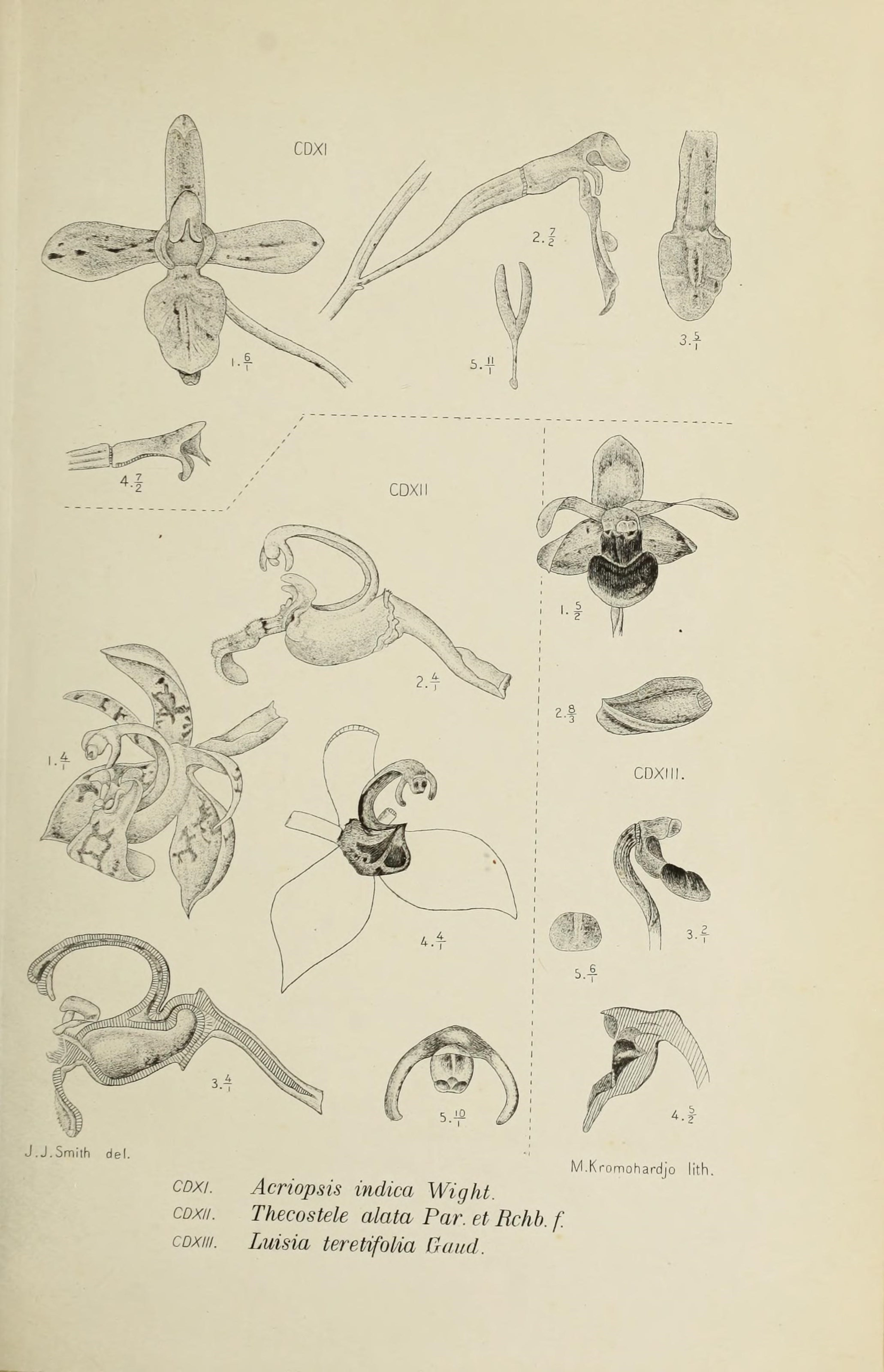

Scientific classification
- Kingdom: Plantae
- Clade: Tracheophytes
- Clade: Angiosperms
- Clade: Monocots
- Order: Asparagales
- Family: Orchidaceae
- Subfamily: Epidendroideae
- Genus: Acriopsis
- Species: A. indica

Binomial name
- Acriopsis indica C.Wright

= Acriopsis indica =

Species of orchid

Acriopsis indica is a species of orchid in the genus Acriopsis. It is widespread through much of Southeast Asia, native to Yunnan, Assam, Andaman Islands, Cambodia, Laos, Myanmar, Thailand, Vietnam, Borneo, Java, Lesser Sunda Islands, Malaysia, Philippines, Sulawesi.
