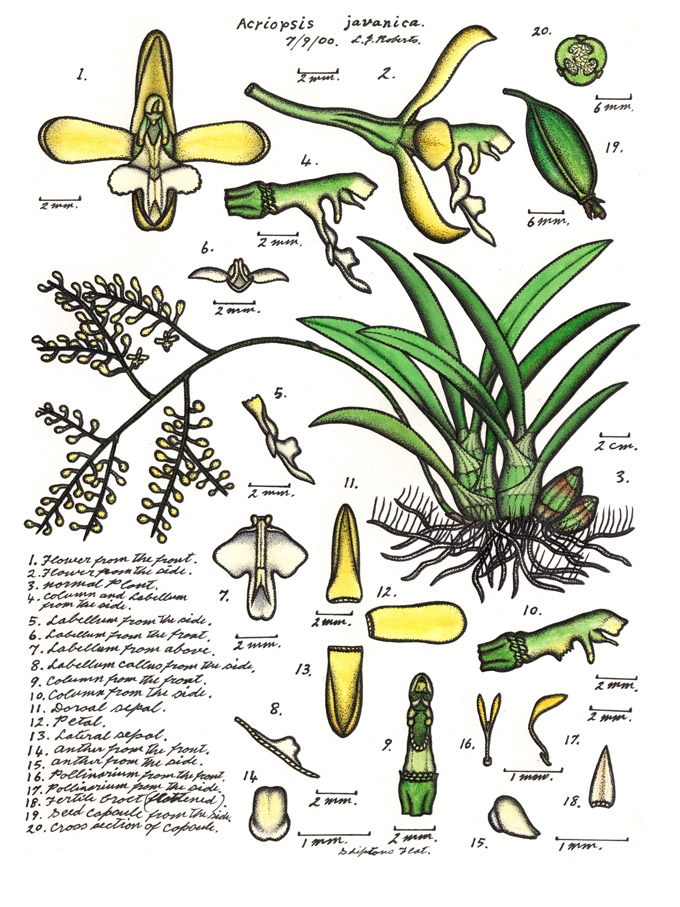
- Illustration of Acriopsis javanica by Lewis Roberts

Scientific classification
- Kingdom: Plantae
- Clade: Tracheophytes
- Clade: Angiosperms
- Clade: Monocots
- Order: Asparagales
- Family: Orchidaceae
- Subfamily: Epidendroideae
- Genus: Acriopsis
- Species: A. javanica

Binomial name
- Acriopsis javanica Reinw. ex Blume

Synonyms
- Acriopsis javanica var. nelsoniana (F.M.Bailey) J.J.Sm.

= Acriopsis javanica =

Species of orchid

Acriopsis javanica is a species of orchid that is native to Southeast Asia, New Guinea, some Pacific islands and northern Australia. It is a clump-forming epiphyte with dark green leaves and curved, branching flower stems with many white and cream-coloured flowers with purple markings.

== Description ==
Acriopsis javanica is an epiphyte with pseudobulbs 13–60 mm (0.51–2.36 in) long and 10–30 mm (0.39–1.18 in) wide. Each pseudobulb has three or four linear leaves 50–320 mm (2.0–12.6 in) long and 3–20 mm (0.12–0.79 in) wide on a petiole 1.5–25 mm (0.059–0.984 in) long. From 12 to 300 white and cream-coloured flowers with purple markings are borne on each flowering stem, the stems 160–1,150 mm (6.3–45.3 in) long. The flowers are 8–14 mm (0.31–0.55 in) wide, 2–40 mm (0.079–1.575 in) apart on a pedicel 3–6.4 mm (0.12–0.25 in) long and have a three-lobed labellum. The dorsal sepal is 4.7–7.2 mm (0.19–0.28 in) long, 1–2.8 mm (0.039–0.110 in) wide and the lateral sepals are fused to form a synsepalum 4.5–7.2 mm (0.18–0.28 in) long and 1.4–3.2 mm (0.055–0.126 in) wide below the labellum. The petals are oblong to egg-shaped, 4.3–6.8 mm (0.17–0.27 in) long and 1.3–3 mm (0.051–0.118 in) wide. The labellum is 4.5 mm (0.2 in) long, about 4 mm (0.2 in) wide and has three lobes.

== Taxonomy and naming ==
The genus Acriopsis was first formally described in 1825 by Carl Ludwig Blume from an unpublished description by Caspar Georg Carl Reinwardt and Blume's description was published in his book Bijdragen tot de Flora van Nederlandsch Indie. In the same volume, Blume described Acriopsis javanica.

Plants of the World Online considers A. javanica to be a synonym of A. liliifolia var. liliifolia.

== Distribution and habitat ==
Acriopsis javanica mainly grows in rainforest and coastal swamp forest, sometimes on Melaleuca leucadendron and Pandanus species. It is found from Vietnam to New Guinea, including Singapore, Indonesia and som Pacific Islands and on the Cape York Peninsula in Queensland, as far south as the Daintree River.
