= Porphyroglottis =

Scientific classification
- Kingdom: Plantae
- Clade: Tracheophytes
- Clade: Angiosperms
- Clade: Monocots
- Order: Asparagales
- Family: Orchidaceae
- Subfamily: Epidendroideae
- Tribe: Cymbidieae
- Subtribe: Cymbidiinae
- Genus: Porphyroglottis; Ridl.
- Species: P. maxwelliae

Binomial name
- Porphyroglottis maxwelliae Ridl.

Genus of orchids

Porphyroglottis is a monotypic genus of flowering plants from the orchid family, Orchidaceae. The sole species is Porphyroglottis maxwelliae, native to Borneo, Malaysia and Sumatra.

== See also ==
- List of Orchidaceae genera
