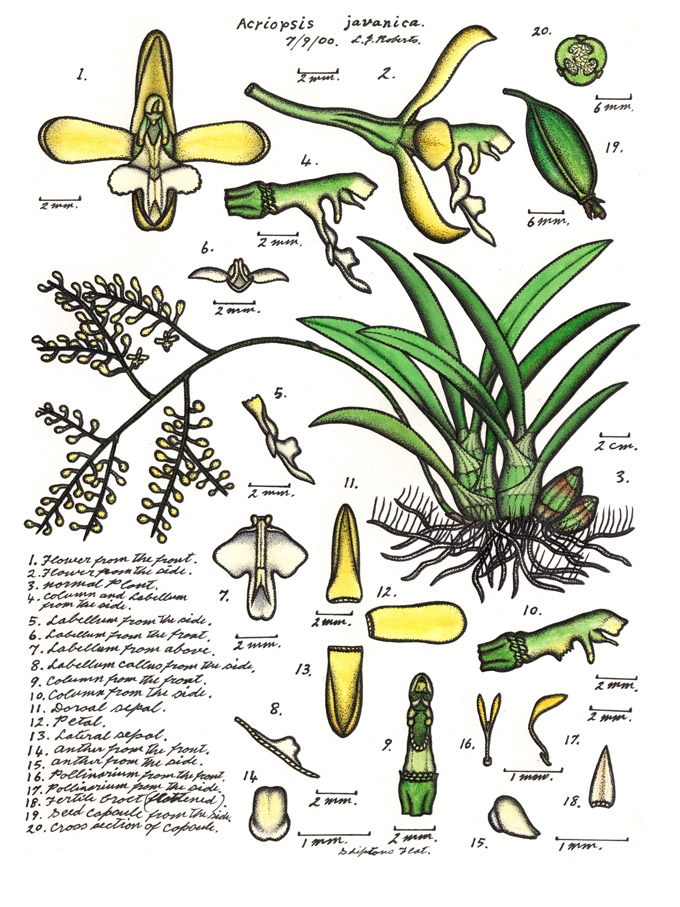
- Illustration of Acriopsis javanica by Lewis Roberts

Scientific classification
- Kingdom: Plantae
- Clade: Tracheophytes
- Clade: Angiosperms
- Clade: Monocots
- Order: Asparagales
- Family: Orchidaceae
- Subfamily: Epidendroideae
- Tribe: Cymbidieae
- Subtribe: Cymbidiinae
- Genus: Acriopsis; Reinw. ex Blume

Type species
- Acriopsis javanica Reinw. ex Blume

= Acriopsis =

Chandelier orchids

Genus of orchids

Acriopsis, commonly known as chandelier orchids or 合萼兰属 (he e lan shu) is a genus of flowering plants in the family Orchidaceaes. Orchids in this genus are epiphytic herbs with spherical or cylindrical pseudobulbs, creeping, branched rhizomes, thin white roots, two or three leaves and many small flowers. The flowers are non-resupinate with the lateral sepals joined along their edges and have spreading petals and a three-lobed labellum. The column has projections that extend hood-like beyond the anther.

The genus was first formally described in 1825 by Carl Ludwig Blume who published the description in Bijdragen tot de flora van Nederlandsch Indië. The name Acriopsis is derived from the Ancient Greek words akris meaning "locust" or "grasshopper" and opsis, meaning "having the appearance of" or "like", referring to the grasshopper-like shape of the column."

Orchids in the genus Acriopsis are found in India, Yunnan, Southeast Asia, New Guinea, Melanesia, Micronesia and Queensland. They grow mainly in low, humid rainforests, sometimes ascending to medium altitudes. Their roots have specialised roots which grow from them up through the air and make branches which feed on litter and other debris.

== Species ==
The following is a list of Acriopsis species accepted by the Plants of the World Online as at April 2023:

- Acriopsis carrii Holttum - Kelantan
- Acriopsis densiflora Lindl.
  - Acriopsis densiflora var. borneensis (Ridl.) Minderh. & de Vogel - Borneo
  - Acriopsis densiflora var. densiflora - Borneo, Sumatra, Peninsular Malaysia
- Acriopsis emarginata D.L.Jones & M.A.Clem. - Queensland
- Acriopsis floribunda Ames
- Acriopsis gracilis Minderh. & de Vogel - Sabah
- Acriopsis indica C.Wright - Yunnan, Assam, Andaman Islands, Cambodia, Laos, Myanmar, Thailand, Vietnam, Borneo, Java, Lesser Sunda Islands, Malaysia, Philippines, Sulawesi
- Acriopsis inopinata Phoon & P.O'Byrne - Peninsular Malaysia
- Acriopsis latifolia Rolfe - Peninsular Malaysia
- Acriopsis liliifolia (J.Koenig) Seidenf.
  - Acriopsis liliifolia var. auriculata (Minderh. & de Vogel) J.J.Wood - Myanmar, Vietnam, Borneo, Java, Sumatra, Peninsular Malaysia
  - Acriopsis liliifolia var. liliifolia - Assam, Sikkim, Andaman Islands, Myanmar, Cambodia, Laos, Malaysia, Thailand, Vietnam, Borneo, Java, Malaysia, Maluku, Lesser Sunda Islands, Sumatra, Sulawesi, Philippines, New Guinea, Solomon Islands, Queensland, Caroline Islands
- Acriopsis ridleyi Hook.f. - Borneo, Malaysia

Acriopsis javanica is listed as a synonym of Acriopsis liliifolia var. lillifolia at Plants of the World Online, but is accepted by the Australian Plant Census.
