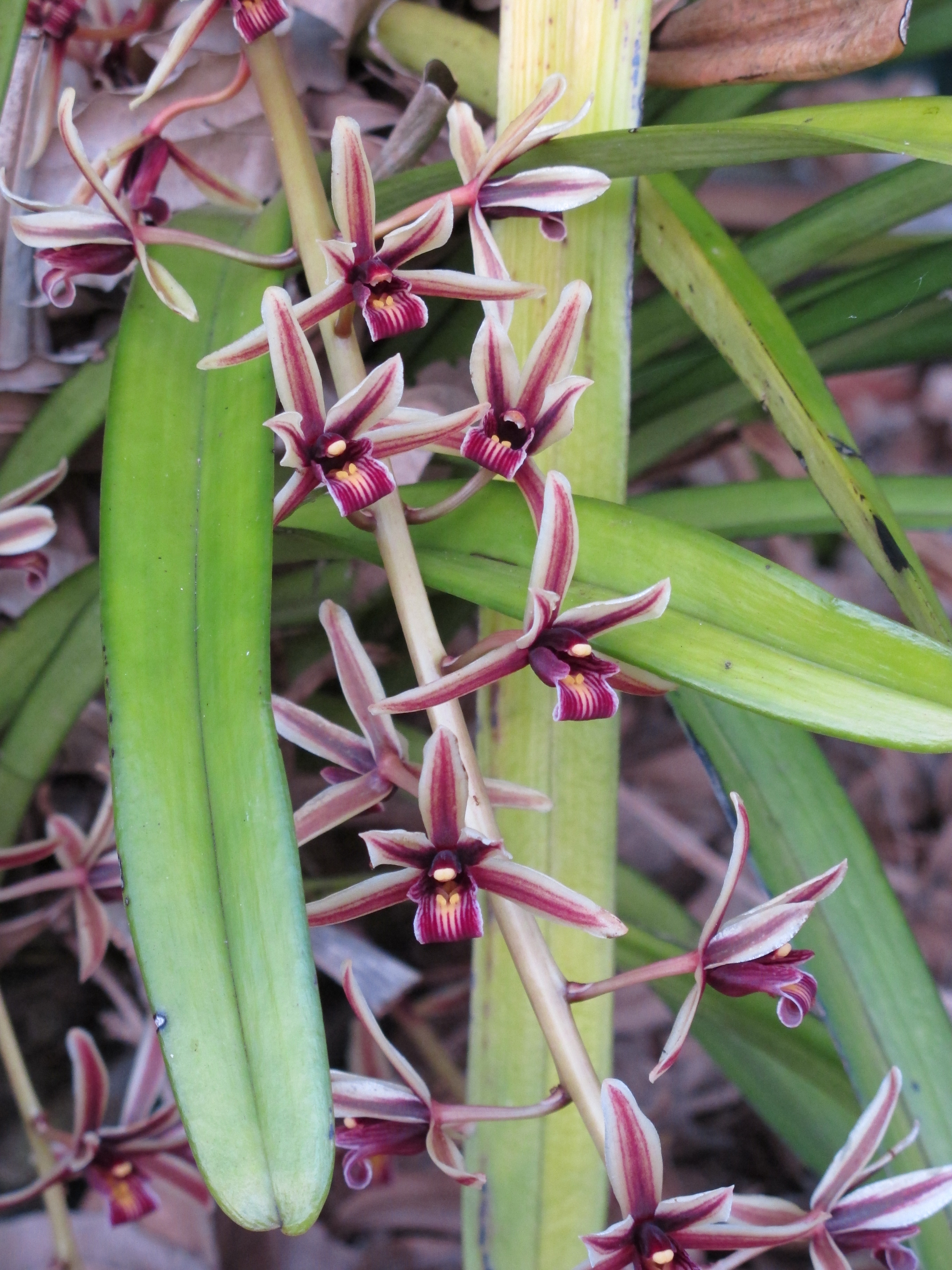
- Cymbidium aloifolium

Scientific classification
- Kingdom: Plantae
- Clade: Tracheophytes
- Clade: Angiosperms
- Clade: Monocots
- Order: Asparagales
- Family: Orchidaceae
- Subfamily: Epidendroideae
- Tribe: Cymbidieae
- Subtribe: Cymbidiinae; Benth.

Genera
- Acriopsis; Cymbidium; Grammatophyllum; Porphyroglottis; Thecopus; Thecostele

= Cymbidiinae =

Subtribe of orchids

Cymbidiinae is an orchid subtribe in the tribe Cymbidieae. The subtribe is named after the genus Cymbidium, the boat orchids. It also contains the largest known species of orchids, Grammatophyllum speciosum.

== See also ==
- Taxonomy of the Orchidaceae
