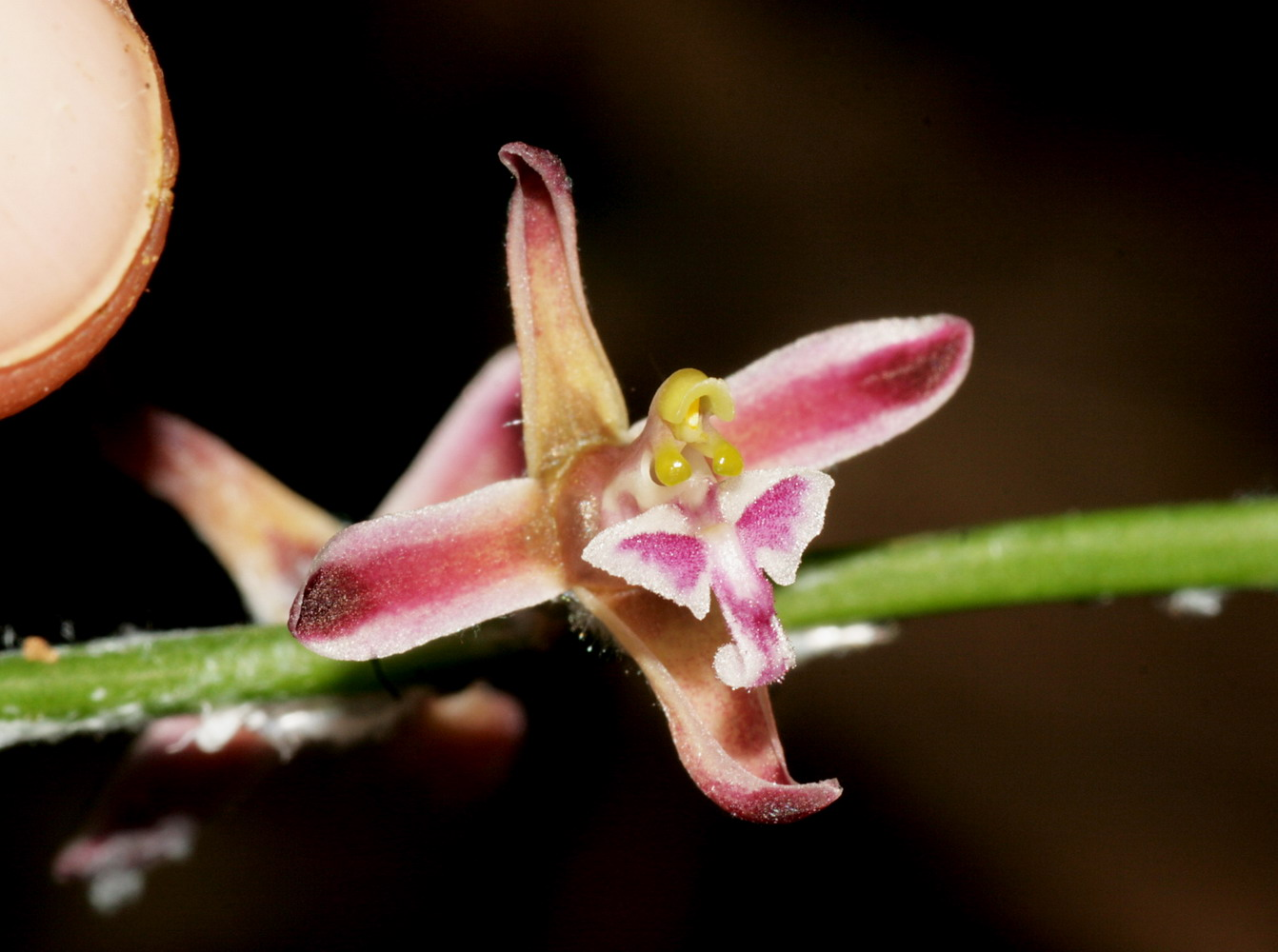

Scientific classification
- Kingdom: Plantae
- Clade: Tracheophytes
- Clade: Angiosperms
- Clade: Monocots
- Order: Asparagales
- Family: Orchidaceae
- Subfamily: Epidendroideae
- Genus: Acriopsis
- Species: A. liliifolia

Binomial name
- Acriopsis liliifolia (J. Koenig) Seidenf.

= Acriopsis liliifolia =

Species of orchid

Acriopsis lilifolia is a species of orchid in the genus Acriopsis.

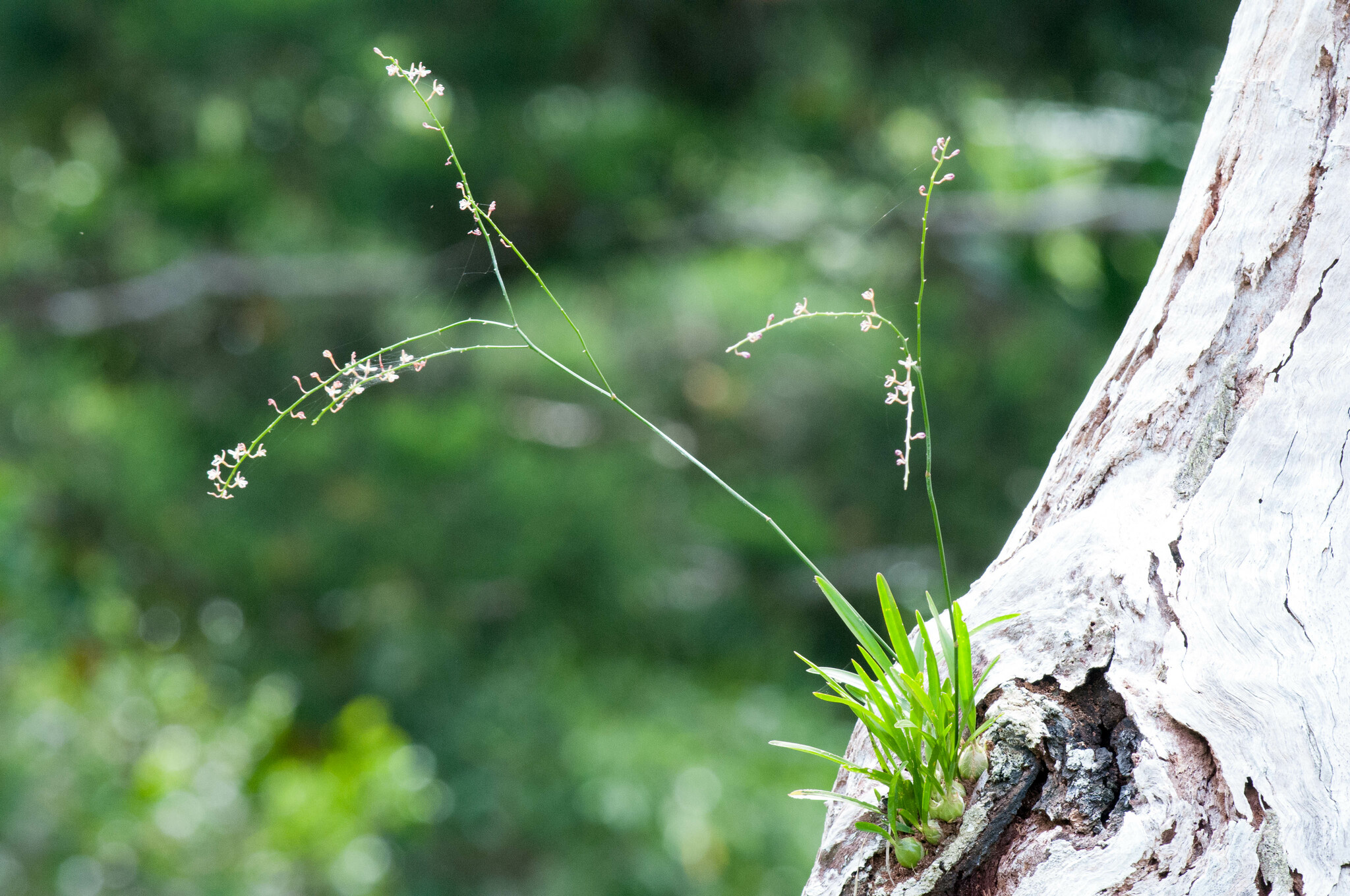
Acriopsis liliifolia growing in Papua New Guinea, uploaded to iNaturalist by naturalist67279.

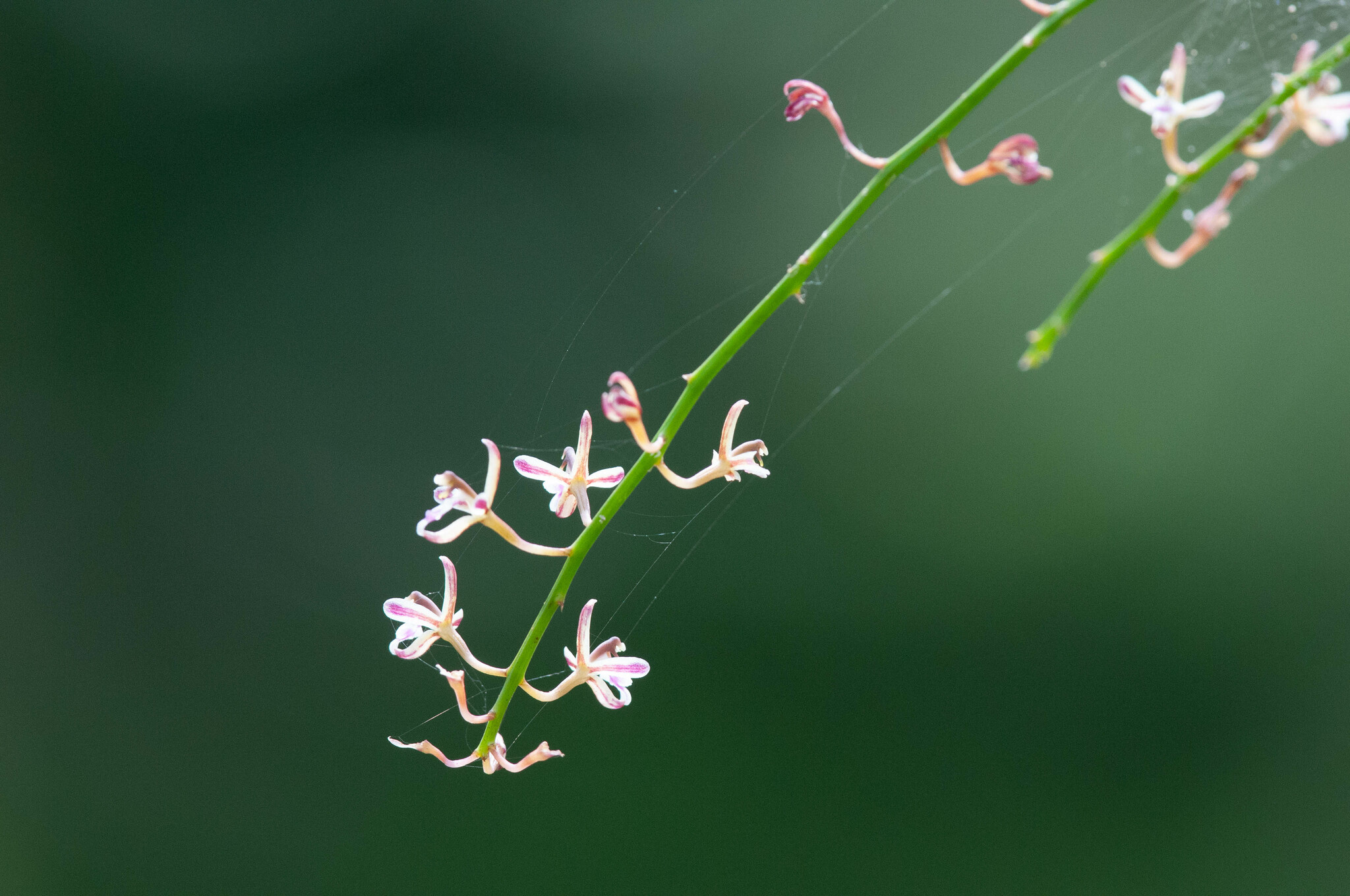
Acriopsis liliifolia growing in Papua New Guinea, close up of flowers. Uploaded to iNaturalist by naturalist67279
