= Thecopus =

Scientific classification
- Kingdom: Plantae
- Clade: Tracheophytes
- Clade: Angiosperms
- Clade: Monocots
- Order: Asparagales
- Family: Orchidaceae
- Subfamily: Epidendroideae
- Tribe: Cymbidieae
- Subtribe: Cymbidiinae
- Genus: Thecopus; Seidenf.

Species
- Thecopus maingayi; Thecopus secunda

Genus of orchids

Thecopus is a genus of flowering plants from the orchid family, Orchidaceae. It has two known species, native to Indochina and Borneo.

== See also ==
- List of Orchidaceae genera
