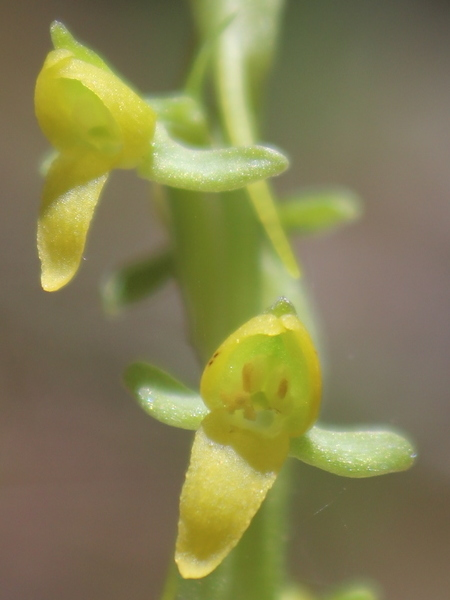

Scientific classification
- Kingdom: Plantae
- Clade: Tracheophytes
- Clade: Angiosperms
- Clade: Monocots
- Order: Asparagales
- Family: Orchidaceae
- Subfamily: Orchidoideae
- Tribe: Orchideae
- Subtribe: Orchidinae
- Genus: Coenoemersa; R.González & Lizb.Hern.

= Coenoemersa =

Genus of flowering plants

Coenoemersa is a genus of flowering plants belonging to the family Orchidaceae.

Its native range is Southern USA to Guatemala.

Species:

- Coenoemersa cualensis R.González & Lizb.Hern.
- Coenoemersa limosa (Lindl.) R.González & Lizb.Hern.
- Coenoemersa volcanica (Lindl.) R.González & Lizb.Hern.
