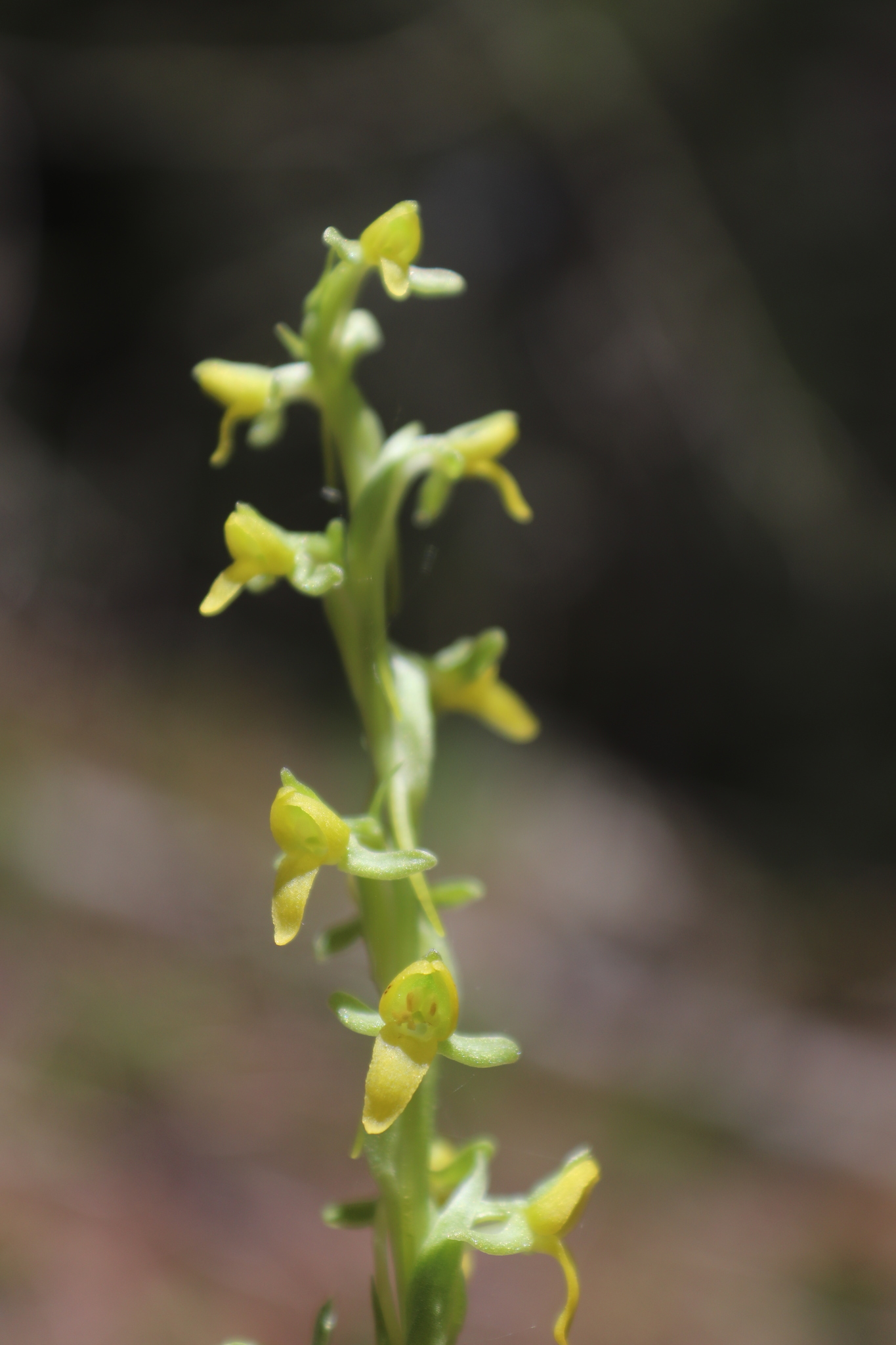
- Coenoemersa limosa

Scientific classification
- Kingdom: Plantae
- Clade: Tracheophytes
- Clade: Angiosperms
- Clade: Monocots
- Order: Asparagales
- Family: Orchidaceae
- Subfamily: Orchidoideae
- Genus: Coenoemersa
- Species: C. limosa

Binomial name
- Coenoemersa limosa R. González & Lizb. Hern.

= Coenoemersa limosa =

Thurber's bog orchid

Species of orchid

Coenoemersa limosa, commonly known as Thurber's bog orchid, is a terrestrial orchid of Guatemala, Mexico and the United States.

== Description ==
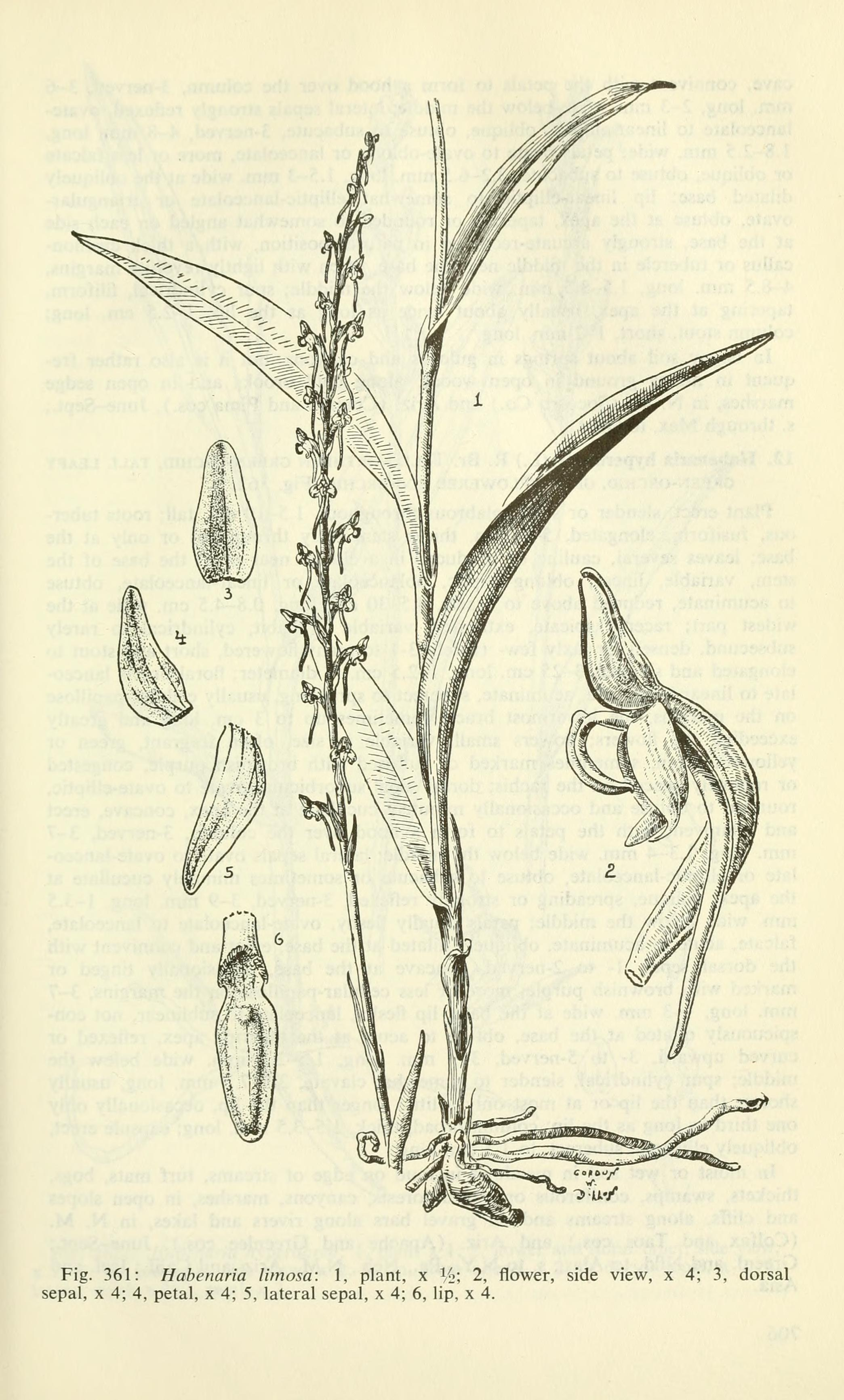
Botanical drawing of Coenoemersa limosa (then known as Habenaria limosa)

Coenoemersa limosa plants are 30–165 centimetres (12–65 in) tall. They have several leaves, up to 28 cm long at the base but gradually getting shorter with the upper leaves having a bract-like appearance. Flowering time is from June to August, with some plants getting up to 200 green to yellowish green flowers in a dense to lax spike. All petals including the lip have an entire margin. There is a thin and long (8–25 mm) nectar spur.

== Distribution and habitat ==
Coenoemersa limosa grows in Arizona and New Mexico in the US, as well as in Mexico and Guatemala.

Its habitat is open, marshy forests at higher elevation (1800–2500 m, up to 4000 m in Central America). It can often be found in seeps or growing at stream banks.

== Taxonomy ==
Coenoemersa limosa was first described by John Lindley in 1840 as Platanthera limosa and as Habenaria thurberi (hence the common name) by Asa Gray in 1868. It was moved to the new genus Coenoemersa in 2010.
