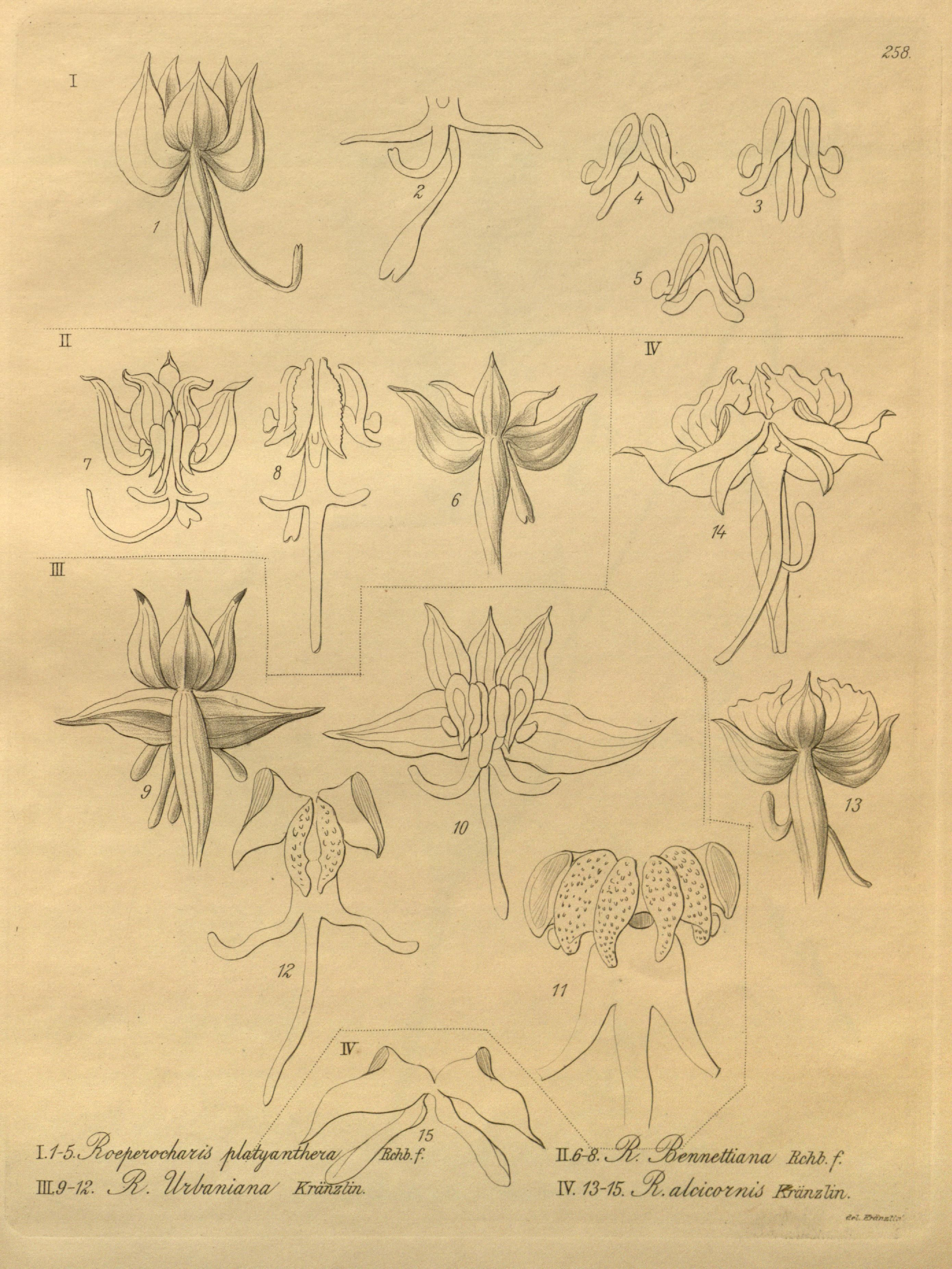
- Habenaria platyanthera (as Roeperocharis p.) - Roeperocharis bennettiana - Roeperocharis urbaniana - Roeperocharis alcicornis - Xenia 3 pl 258

Scientific classification
- Kingdom: Plantae
- Clade: Tracheophytes
- Clade: Angiosperms
- Clade: Monocots
- Order: Asparagales
- Family: Orchidaceae
- Subfamily: Orchidoideae
- Tribe: Orchideae
- Subtribe: Orchidinae
- Genus: Roeperocharis; Rchb.f.

= Roeperocharis =

Genus of flowering plants

Roeperocharis is a genus of flowering plants from the orchid family, Orchidaceae, native to eastern Africa. As of June 2014, the following species are recognized:

- Roeperocharis alcicornis Kraenzl. in H.G.Reichenbach - Ethiopia
- Roeperocharis bennettiana Rchb.f. - Ethiopia, Kenya, Tanzania, Malawi, Mozambique, Zambia
- Roeperocharis maleveziana Geerinck - Zaïre
- Roeperocharis urbaniana Kraenzl. in H.G.Reichenbach - Ethiopia
- Roeperocharis wentzeliana Kraenzl. - Zaïre, Tanzania, Malawi, Zambia

== See also ==
- List of Orchidaceae genera
