= Roeperocharis bennettiana =

Scientific classification
- Kingdom: Plantae
- Clade: Tracheophytes
- Clade: Angiosperms
- Clade: Monocots
- Order: Asparagales
- Family: Orchidaceae
- Subfamily: Orchidoideae
- Genus: Roeperocharis
- Species: R. bennettiana

Binomial name
- Roeperocharis bennettiana Rchb.f.

Species of plant

Roeperocharis bennettiana is a terrestrial orchid native of East Africa. It is one of the 4 known species of the genus Roeperocharis as of 2014. This species of orchid has been reported to grow on woodland, Mbuga and grassland vegetations.

== Structure ==
The plant grows from an ellipsoid underground tuber to reach heights of up to 95 cm. Its leaves are up to 25 cm long and 2.5 cm broad. The plant bears distinct narrow cylindrical inflorescences with yellow-green or green flowers. The inflorescences may be 11-24 cm long and are densely flowered.

Roeperocharis bennettiana flowers in February in the Southern Highlands of Tanzania. The plant has been reported to grow on Mount Namuli in Mozambique.
