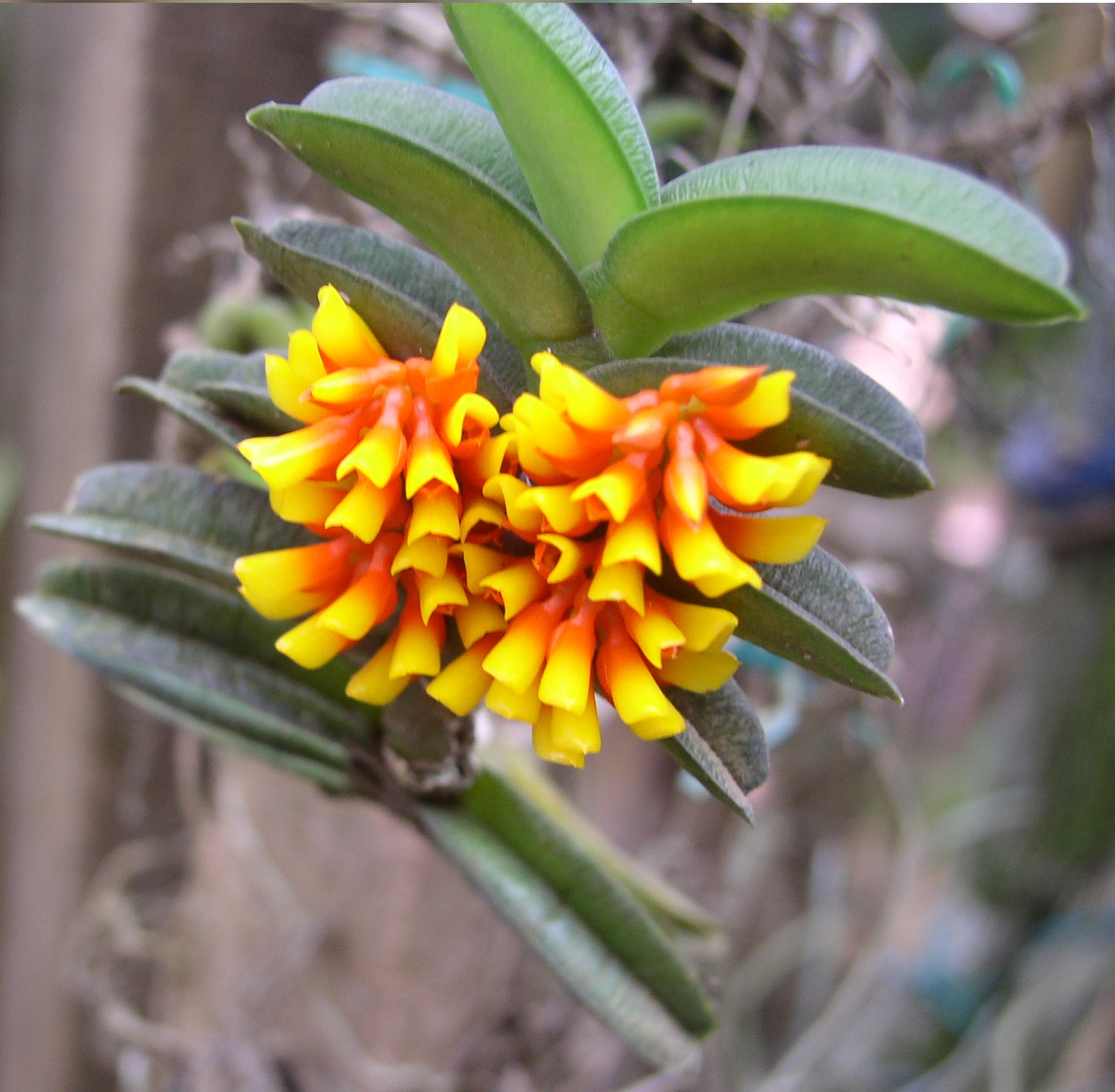

Conservation status
- Critically Endangered (IUCN 3.1)

Scientific classification
- Kingdom: Plantae
- Clade: Tracheophytes
- Clade: Angiosperms
- Clade: Monocots
- Order: Asparagales
- Family: Orchidaceae
- Subfamily: Epidendroideae
- Genus: Calyptrochilum
- Species: C. aurantiacum

Binomial name
- Calyptrochilum aurantiacum (P.J.Cribb & Laan) Stévart

= Calyptrochilum aurantiacum =

Species of orchid

Calyptrochilum aurantiacum is a plant species in the family Orchidaceae. It is endemic to Cameroon. Its natural habitat is subtropical or tropical moist lowland forests. It is threatened by habitat loss.
