= List of Maxillaria species =

There are about 650 species of Maxillaria. Many species that were formerly classified in this genus have been reclassified under Lycaste and Xylobium. The following species are accepted by the Plants of the World Online as of August 2023:

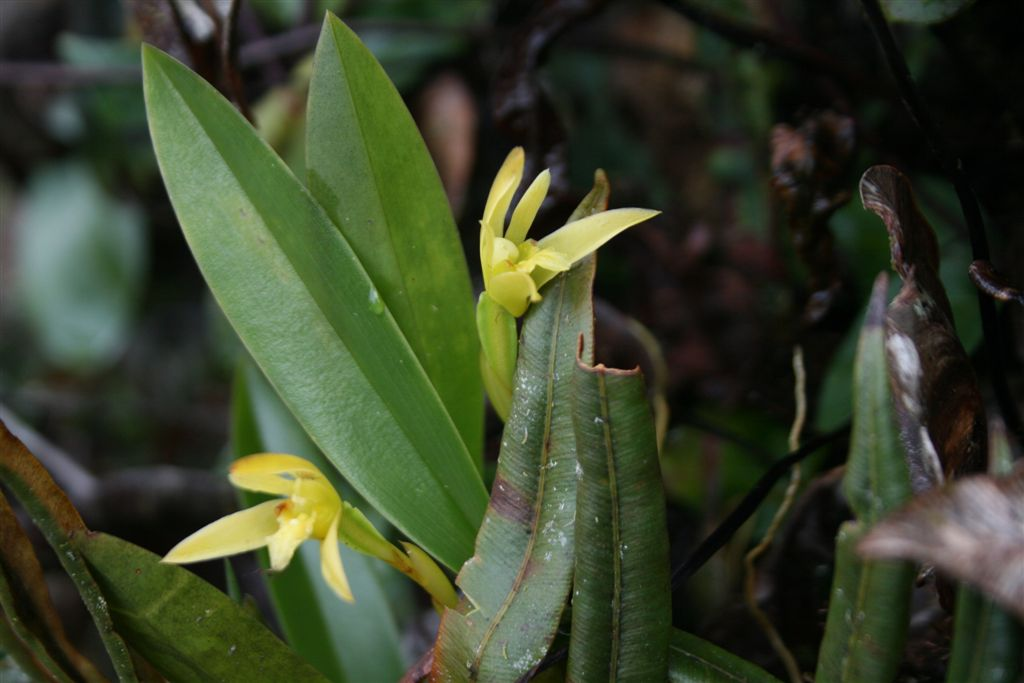
Maxillaria brunnea

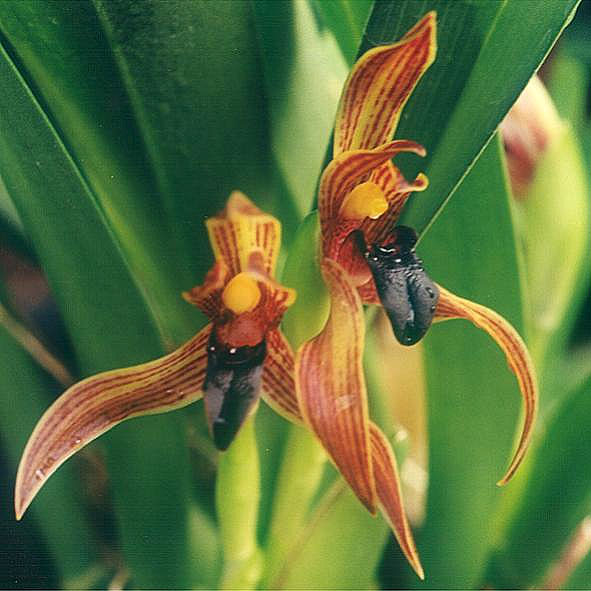
Cowl-carrying Maxillaria (Maxillaria cucullata)

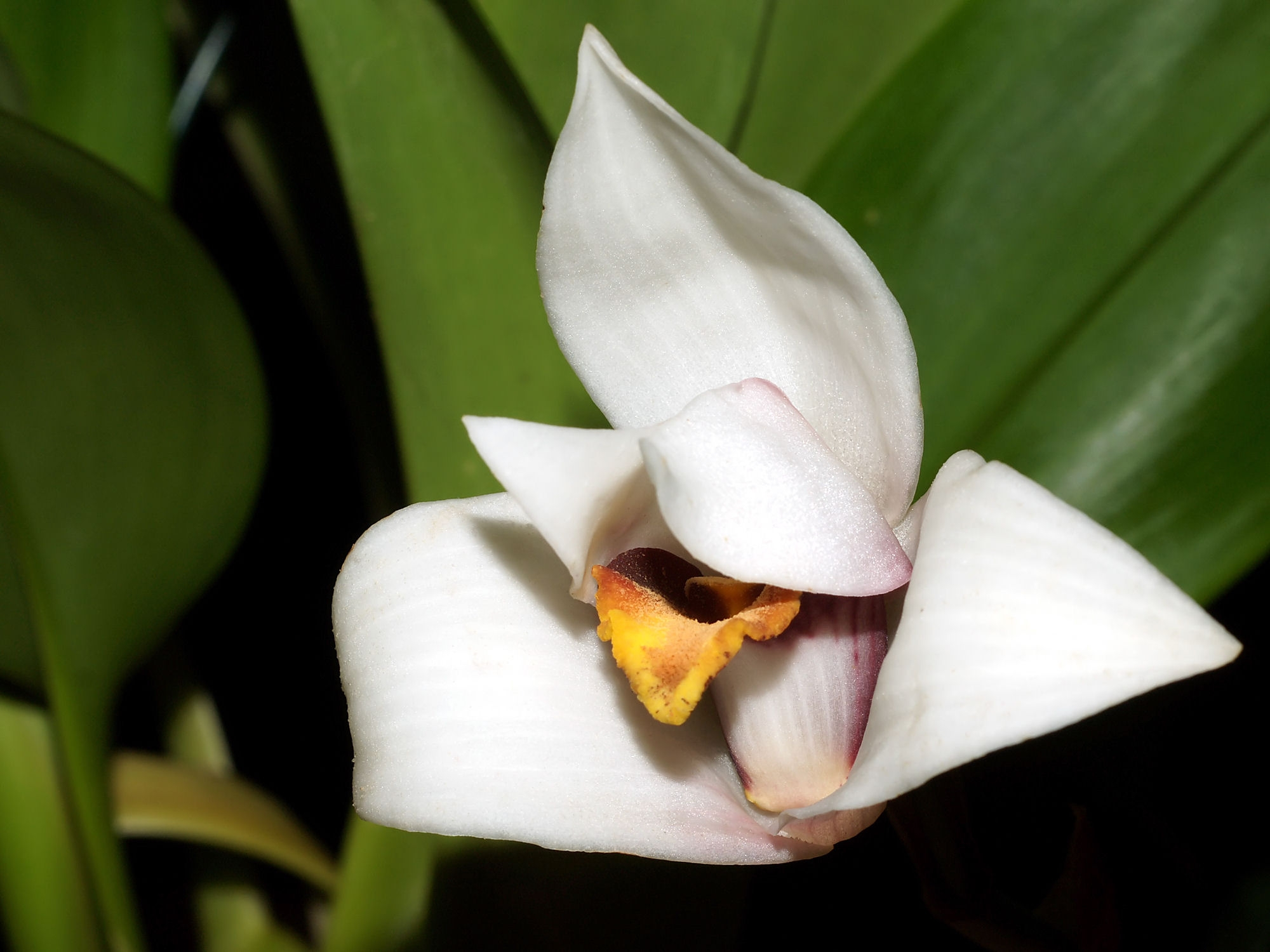
Maxillaria grandiflora

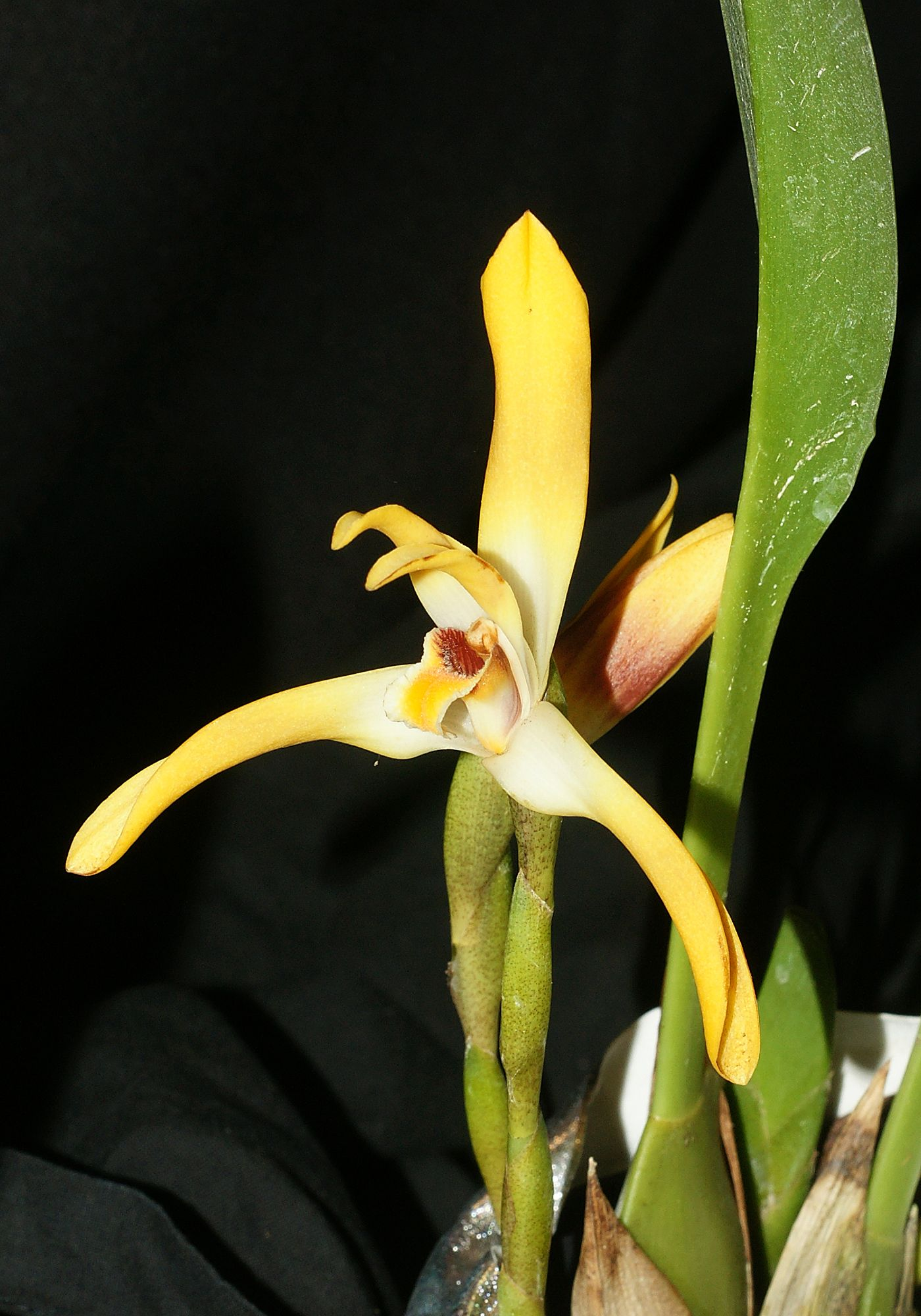
Maxillaria luteoalba

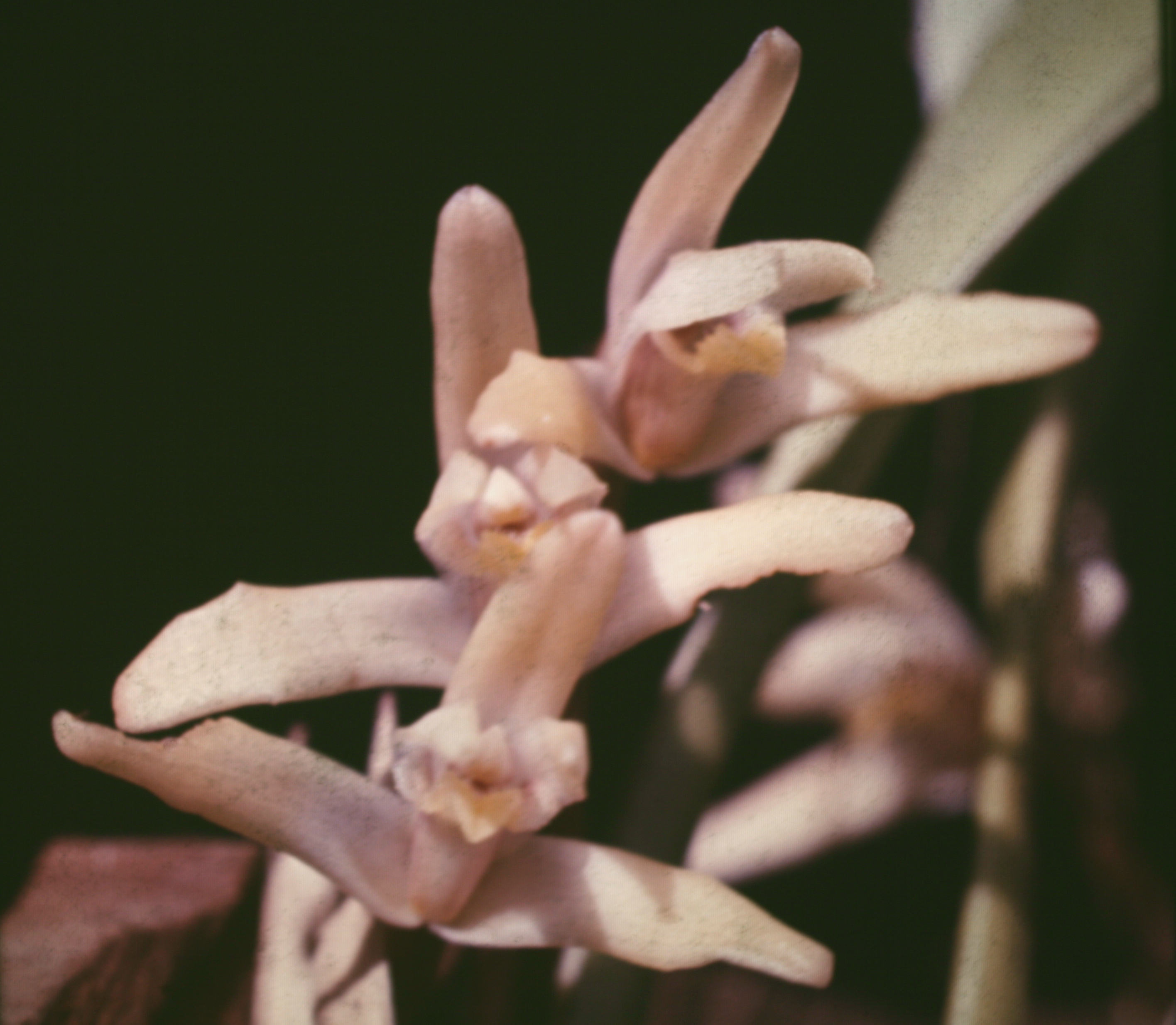
Maxillaria parkeri

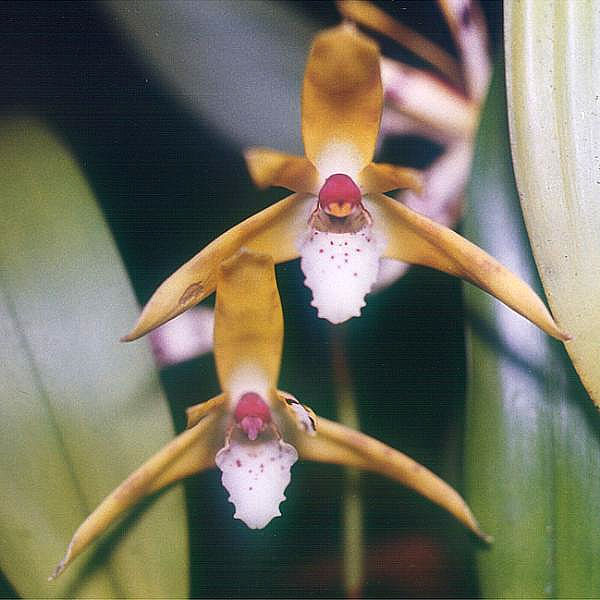
Painted Maxillaria (Maxillaria picta)

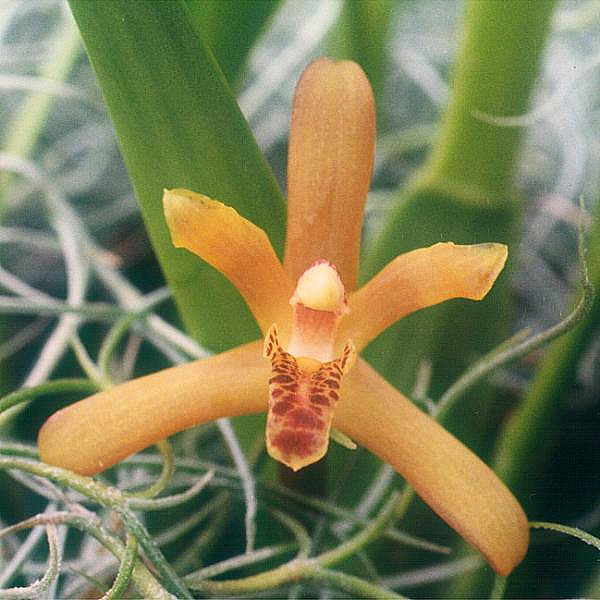
Light Fox-red Maxillaria (Maxillaria rufescens)

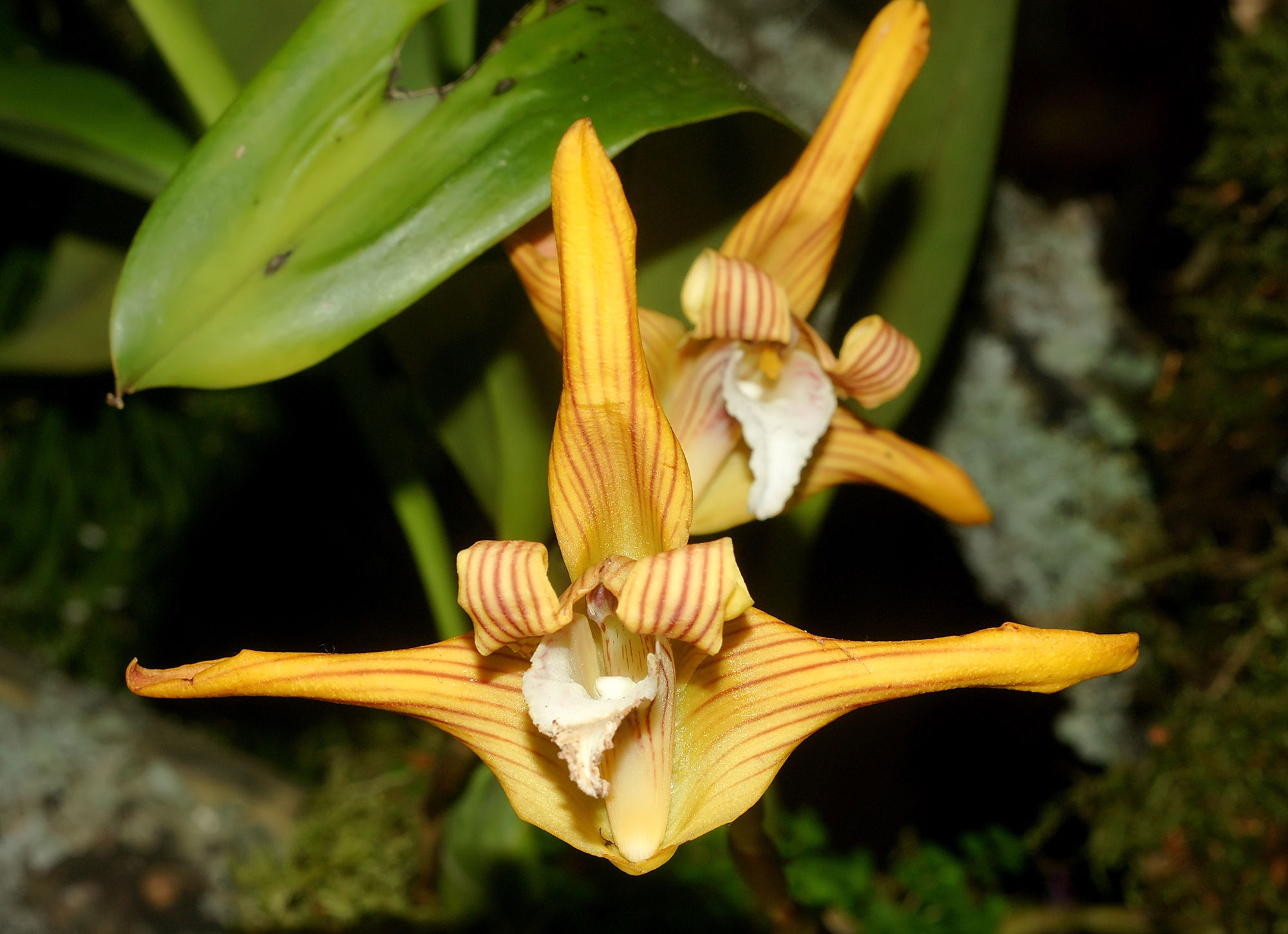
Maxillaria striata

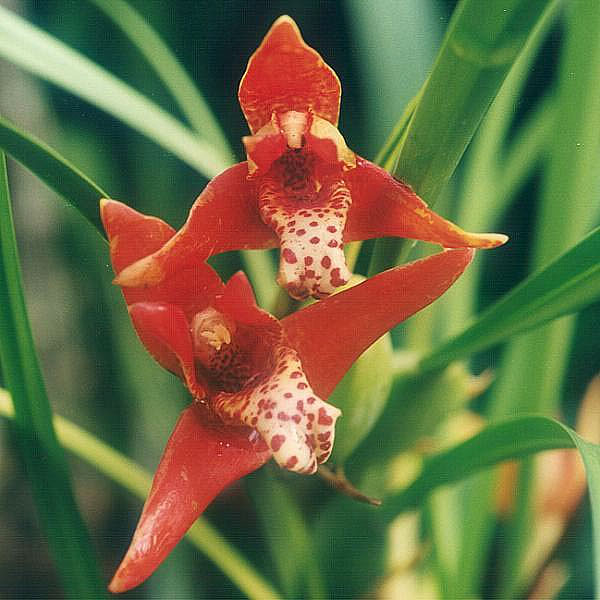
Coconut Pie Orchid (Maxillaria tenuifolia)

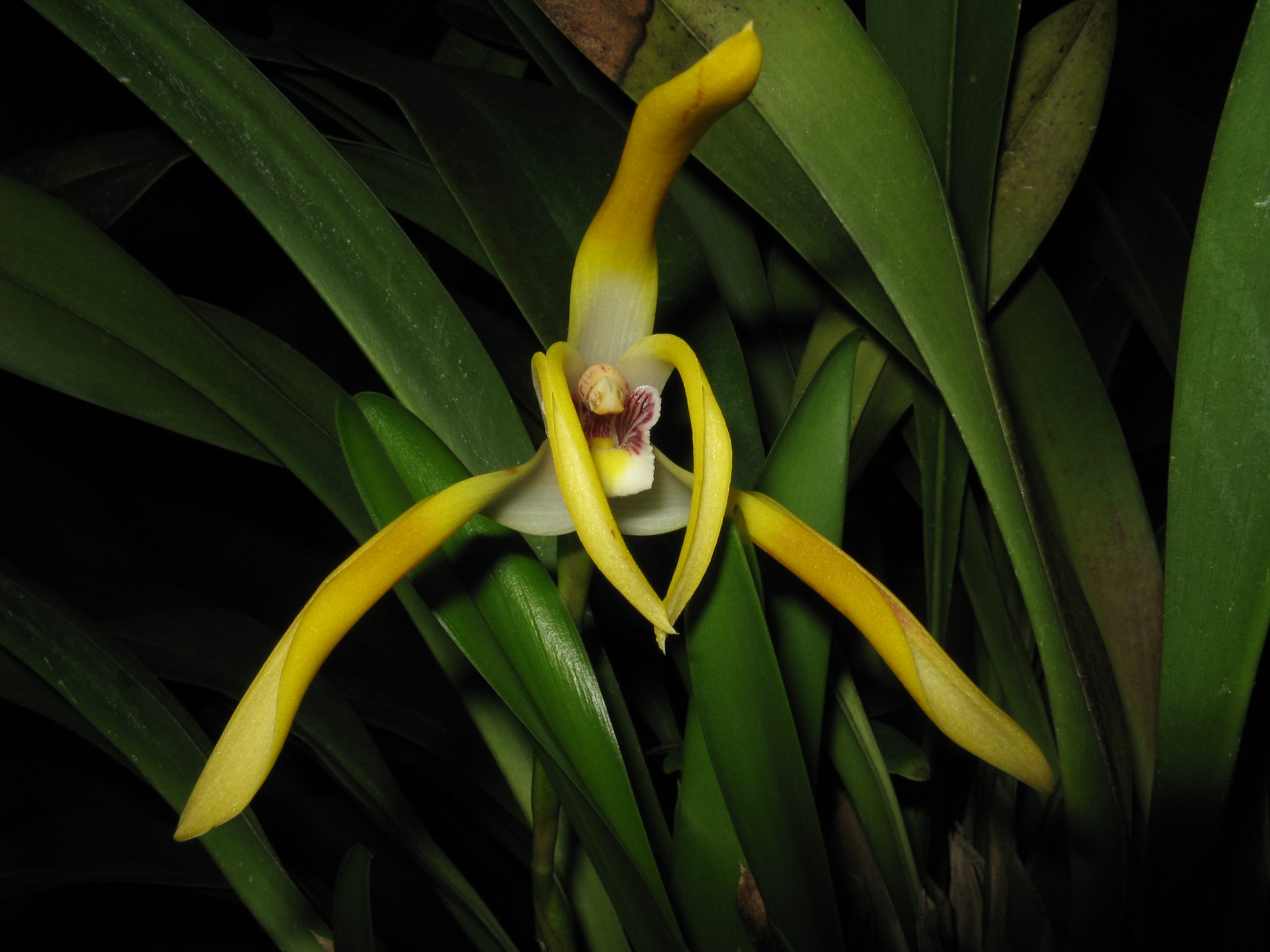
Maxillaria longipetala

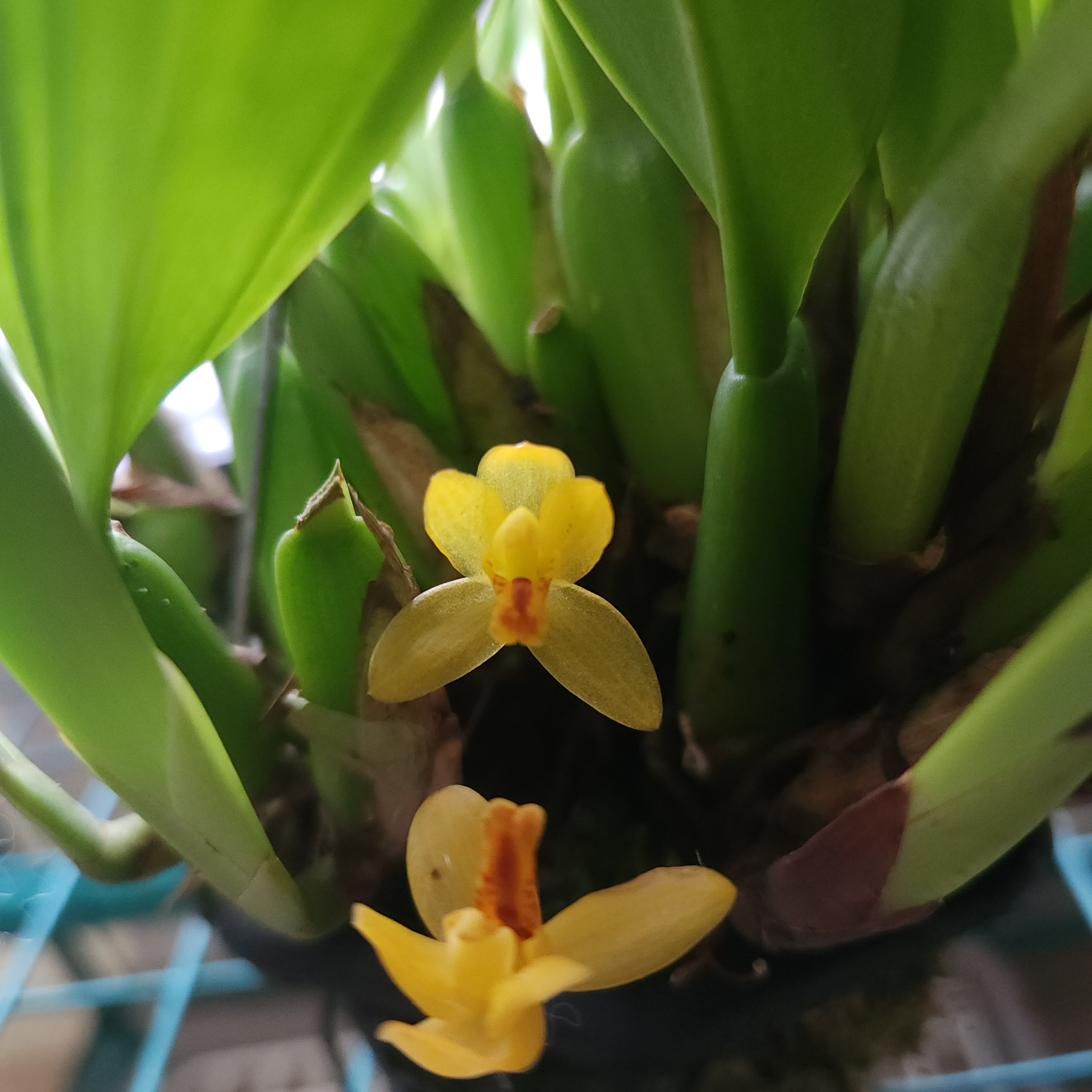
Maxillaria aureoglobula

- Maxillaria acervata Rchb.f.
- Maxillaria aciantha Rchb.f.
- Maxillaria acostae Schltr.
- Maxillaria acuminata Lindl.
- Maxillaria acutifolia Lindl.
- Maxillaria adendrobium (Rchb.f.) Dressler
- Maxillaria adolphi (Schltr.) Ames & Correll
- Maxillaria adscendens Schltr.
- Maxillaria aequiloba Schltr.
- Maxillaria affinis (Poepp. & Endl.) Garay
- Maxillaria aggregata (Kunth) Lindl.
- Maxillaria alata Ruiz & Pav.
- Maxillaria alba (Hook.) Lindl.
- Maxillaria albata Lindl.
- Maxillaria albiflora Ames & C.Schweinf.
- Maxillaria alfaroi Ames & C.Schweinf.
- Maxillaria allenii L.O.Williams
- Maxillaria alpestris Lindl.
- Maxillaria alticola C.Schweinf.
- Maxillaria amabilis J.T.Atwood
- Maxillaria amblyantha Kraenzl.
- Maxillaria amesiana Mast.
- Maxillaria amplifoliata Molinari
- Maxillaria anacatalinaportillae Szlach. & Lipińska
- Maxillaria anatomorum Rchb.f.
- Maxillaria anceps Ames & C.Schweinf.
- Maxillaria anceschiana Molinari
- Maxillaria angelae Christenson
- Maxillaria angustibulbosa C.Schweinf.
- Maxillaria angustisegmenta Ames & C.Schweinf.
- Maxillaria angustissima Ames, F.T.Hubb. & C.Schweinf.
- Maxillaria antioquiana Kraenzl.
- Maxillaria antioquiensis (Schltr.) Molinari
- Maxillaria appendiculoides C.Schweinf.
- Maxillaria arachnites Rchb.f.
- Maxillaria arachnitiflora Ames & C.Schweinf.
- Maxillaria arbuscula Rchb.f.
- Maxillaria archilarum (Chiron) Molinari
- Maxillaria argyrophylla Poepp. & Endl.
- Maxillaria atrovinacea Christenson
- Maxillaria atwoodiana Pupulin
- Maxillaria augustae-victoriae F.Lehm. & Kraenzl.
- Maxillaria aurea (Poepp. & Endl.) L.O.Williams
- Maxillaria aureoglobula Christenson
- Maxillaria auyantepuiensis Foldats
- Maxillaria avis Molinari
- Maxillaria azulensis D.E.Benn. & Christenson
- Maxillaria barbosae Loefgr.
- Maxillaria batemanii Poepp. & Endl.
- Maxillaria baudoensis Christenson
- Maxillaria beckendorfii (Carnevali) Molinari
- Maxillaria bennettii Christenson
- Maxillaria betancurii Christenson
- Maxillaria bettymooreana Christenson
- Maxillaria bicallosa (Rchb.f.) Garay
- Maxillaria bicentenaria Collantes & C.Martel
- Maxillaria binotii De Wild.
- Maxillaria biolleyi (Schltr.) L.O.Williams
- Maxillaria bocazensis D.E.Benn. & Christenson
- Maxillaria bolivarensis C.Schweinf.
- Maxillaria boliviensis Schltr.
- Maxillaria bolleoides Schltr.
- Maxillaria bomboizensis Dodson
- Maxillaria brachybulbon Schltr.
- Maxillaria brachypetala Schltr.
- Maxillaria brachypoda Schltr.
- Maxillaria bracteata (Schltr.) Ames & Correll
- Maxillaria bradei Schltr. ex Hoehne
- Maxillaria bradeorum (Schltr.) L.O.Williams
- Maxillaria brasiliensis Brieger & Illg
- Maxillaria brendae Molinari
- Maxillaria brevifolia (Lindl.) Rchb.f.
- Maxillaria brevilabia Ames & Correll
- Maxillaria brevis (Hoehne & Schltr.) Hoehne
- Maxillaria breviscapa Poepp. & Endl.
- Maxillaria briggittheae Molinari
- Maxillaria broadwayi (Cogn.) R.E.Schult.
- Maxillaria buchtienii Schltr.
- Maxillaria burgeri J.T.Atwood
- Maxillaria burtonii D.E.Benn. & Christenson
- Maxillaria cacaoensis J.T.Atwood
- Maxillaria cachacoensis J.T.Atwood
- Maxillaria caespitifica Rchb.f.
- Maxillaria calantha Schltr.
- Maxillaria calcarata (Schltr.) Molinari
- Maxillaria calimaniana V.P.Castro
- Maxillaria callichroma Rchb.f.
- Maxillaria caloglossa Rchb.f.
- Maxillaria camaridioides Schltr.
- Maxillaria campanulata C.Schweinf.
- Maxillaria canarensis J.T.Atwood
- Maxillaria canarina D.E.Benn. & Christenson
- Maxillaria candida Lodd. ex Lindl.
- Maxillaria caparaoensis Brade
- Maxillaria caquetana Schltr.
- Maxillaria carinulata Rchb.f.
- Maxillaria carolii Christenson
- Maxillaria carrilloi Christenson
- Maxillaria cassapensis Rchb.f.
- Maxillaria casta Kraenzl.
- Maxillaria caucae Garay
- Maxillaria caucana Schltr.
- Maxillaria caveroi D.E.Benn. & Christenson
- Maxillaria cedralensis J.T.Atwood & Mora-Ret.
- Maxillaria cesarfernandezii Christenson
- Maxillaria chacoensis Dodson
- Maxillaria chartacifolia Ames & C.Schweinf.
- Maxillaria chicana Dodson
- Maxillaria chimalapana Soto Arenas & Salazar
- Maxillaria chionantha J.T.Atwood
- Maxillaria chlorantha Lindl.
- Maxillaria christensonii D.E.Benn.
- Maxillaria christobalensis Rchb.f.
- Maxillaria chrysantha Barb.Rodr.
- Maxillaria chrysocycnoides (Schltr.) Senghas
- Maxillaria cleistogama Brieger & Illg
- Maxillaria cobanensis Schltr.
- Maxillaria coccinea (Jacq.) L.O.Williams
- Maxillaria colemanii Carnevali & Fritz
- Maxillaria colombiana Christenson
- Maxillaria colorata Rchb.f.
- Maxillaria compacta (Schltr.) P.Ortiz
- Maxillaria concavilabia Ames & Correll
- Maxillaria condorensis J.T.Atwood
- Maxillaria conduplicata (Ames & C.Schweinf.) L.O.Williams
- Maxillaria confusa Ames & C.Schweinf.
- Maxillaria connellii Rolfe
- Maxillaria convencionis Kraenzl.
- Maxillaria cordyline (Rchb.f.) Dodson
- Maxillaria cornuta C.Schweinf.
- Maxillaria costaricensis Schltr.
- Maxillaria cozieriana H.G.Jones
- Maxillaria crassifolia (Lindl.) Rchb.f.
- Maxillaria crispiloba Sauvêtre & McIllm.
- Maxillaria crocea Lindl.
- Maxillaria croceorubens (Rchb.f.) L.O.Williams
- Maxillaria cruentata (Arévalo & Bergq.) Molinari & Mayta
- Maxillaria cryptobulbon Carnevali & J.T.Atwood
- Maxillaria cryptocentroides Molinari
- Maxillaria ctenostachys Rchb.f.
- Maxillaria cucullata Lindl.
- Maxillaria culebrica (Bogarín & Pupulin) Christenson
- Maxillaria cuneiformis Ruiz & Pav.
- Maxillaria curtipes Hook.
- Maxillaria curvicolumna M.A.Blanco & Neubig
- Maxillaria cuzcoensis C.Schweinf.
- Maxillaria cymbidioides Dodson, J.T.Atwood & Carnevali
- Maxillaria dalessandroi Dodson
- Maxillaria darienensis J.T.Atwood
- Maxillaria deherae Molinari
- Maxillaria dendrobioides (Schltr.) L.O.Williams
- Maxillaria deniseae Collantes & Christenson
- Maxillaria densa Lindl.
- Maxillaria densifolia (Poepp. & Endl.) Rchb.f.
- Maxillaria desvauxiana Rchb.f.
- Maxillaria deuterocaquetana P.Ortiz
- Maxillaria deuteropastensis P.Ortiz
- Maxillaria diamantensis Kraenzl.
- Maxillaria dichaeoides D.E.Benn. & Christenson
- Maxillaria dichotoma (Schltr.) L.O.Williams
- Maxillaria dichroma Rolfe
- Maxillaria dillonii D.E.Benn. & Christenson
- Maxillaria disciflora (Sambin & Chiron) Molinari
- Maxillaria discolor (Lodd. ex Lindl.) Rchb.
- Maxillaria disticha (Lindl.) C.Schweinf.
- Maxillaria diuturna Ames & C.Schweinf.
- Maxillaria divaricata (Barb.Rodr.) Cogn.
- Maxillaria divitiflora Rchb.f.
- Maxillaria dodsonii (Carnevali) Molinari
- Maxillaria dolichophylla Schltr.
- Maxillaria donaldeedodii (Ackerman & Whitten) Christenson
- Maxillaria × doucetteana Christenson
- Maxillaria dressleriana Carnevali & J.T.Atwood
- Maxillaria × dunstervillei Carnevali & I.Ramírez
- Maxillaria dunstervilleorum (Carnevali & G.A.Romero) Molinari
- Maxillaria eburnea Lindl.
- Maxillaria echinophyta Barb.Rodr.
- Maxillaria ecuadorensis Schltr.
- Maxillaria egertoniana (Bateman ex Lindl.) Molinari
- Maxillaria elata Schltr.
- Maxillaria elatior (Rchb.f.) Rchb.f.
- Maxillaria elegans Schltr.
- Maxillaria elegantula Rolfe
- Maxillaria elianae (Carnevali & M.A.Blanco) Christenson
- Maxillaria elluziae Molinari
- Maxillaria embreei Dodson
- Maxillaria encyclioides J.T.Atwood & Dodson
- Maxillaria endresii Rchb.f.
- Maxillaria equitans (Schltr.) Garay
- Maxillaria erecta Christenson
- Maxillaria erikae Molinari
- Maxillaria errata Christenson
- Maxillaria erubescens Kraenzl.
- Maxillaria escobarii (Carnevali) Molinari
- Maxillaria estradae Dodson
- Maxillaria exaltata (Kraenzl.) C.Schweinf.
- Maxillaria faecalis (Archila & Chiron) Molinari
- Maxillaria falcata Ames & Correll
- Maxillaria farinifera Schltr.
- Maxillaria farinosa Arévalo & Christenson
- Maxillaria ferdinandiana Barb.Rodr.
- Maxillaria ferruginea Christenson
- Maxillaria fimbriatiloba Carnevali & G.A.Romero
- Maxillaria flabellata D.E.Benn. & Christenson
- Maxillaria flava Ames, F.T.Hubb. & C.Schweinf.
- Maxillaria fletcheriana J.G.Fowler
- Maxillaria floribunda Lindl.
- Maxillaria foetida D.E.Benn. & Christenson
- Maxillaria foldatsiana Carnevali & I.Ramírez
- Maxillaria foliosa Ames & C.Schweinf.
- Maxillaria fractiflexa Rchb.f.
- Maxillaria fragrans J.T.Atwood
- Maxillaria fraudulenta Christenson
- Maxillaria frechettei D.E.Benn. & Christenson
- Maxillaria friderici-caroli P.Ortiz
- Maxillaria friedrichsthalii Rchb.f.
- Maxillaria frigens Sambin & Chiron
- Maxillaria fritzii (Ojeda & Carnevali) Christenson
- Maxillaria frontinoensis (Garay) Molinari
- Maxillaria fucata Rchb.f.
- Maxillaria fuerstenbergiana Schltr.
- Maxillaria fulgens (Rchb.f.) L.O.Williams
- Maxillaria funicaulis C.Schweinf.
- Maxillaria furfuracea Scheidw.
- Maxillaria fusae Molinari, A.G.Molinari & A.F.Molinari
- Maxillaria fuscopurpurea Drapiez
- Maxillaria galantha J.T.Atwood & Carnevali
- Maxillaria garayi D.E.Benn. & Christenson
- Maxillaria geckophora D.E.Benn. & Christenson
- Maxillaria gentryi Dodson
- Maxillaria gerardi (P.Ortiz) Molinari
- Maxillaria gladiata Schuit.
- Maxillaria gomeziana J.T.Atwood
- Maxillaria gorbatschowii R.Vásquez, Dodson & Ibisch
- Maxillaria gracilipes Schltr.
- Maxillaria gracillima (Ames & C.Schweinf.) Molinari
- Maxillaria graminifolia (Kunth) Rchb.f.
- Maxillaria grandiflora (Kunth) Lindl.
- Maxillaria grandimentum C.Schweinf.
- Maxillaria grandis Rchb.f.
- Maxillaria granditenuis D.E.Benn. & Christenson
- Maxillaria grayi Dodson
- Maxillaria grisebachiana Nir & Dod
- Maxillaria grobyoides Garay & Dunst.
- Maxillaria gualaquizensis Dodson
- Maxillaria guareimensis Rchb.f.
- Maxillaria guentheriana Kraenzl.
- Maxillaria guiardiana Chiron
- Maxillaria guillermoi Schuit. & M.W.Chase
- Maxillaria gymnochila Kraenzl.
- Maxillaria haberi J.T.Atwood
- Maxillaria haemathodes (Ruiz & Pav.) Garay
- Maxillaria hagsateriana Soto Arenas
- Maxillaria hajekii D.E.Benn. & Christenson
- Maxillaria hastulata Lindl.
- Maxillaria hedwigiae Hamer & Dodson
- Maxillaria heismanniana Barb.Rodr.
- Maxillaria hematoglossa A.Rich. & Galeotti
- Maxillaria henchmanii Hook.
- Maxillaria hennisiana Schltr.
- Maxillaria herbacea Molinari
- Maxillaria heterobulba (Kraenzl.) Christenson
- Maxillaria hillsii Dodson
- Maxillaria hirsutilabia D.E.Benn. & Christenson
- Maxillaria histrionica (Rchb.f.) L.O.Williams
- Maxillaria hoppii Schltr.
- Maxillaria horichii Senghas
- Maxillaria houtteana Rchb.f.
- Maxillaria huancabambae (Kraenzl.) C.Schweinf.
- Maxillaria huanucoensis D.E.Benn. & Christenson
- Maxillaria huebschii Rchb.f.
- Maxillaria humilis (Link & Otto) Schuit. & M.W.Chase
- Maxillaria huntii Christenson
- Maxillaria imbricata Barb.Rodr.
- Maxillaria inaequisepala (C.Schweinf.) Molinari
- Maxillaria inaudita Rchb.f.
- Maxillaria infausta Rchb.f.
- Maxillaria inflexa (Lindl.) Griseb.
- Maxillaria insolita Dressler
- Maxillaria irrorata Rchb.f.
- Maxillaria jacquelineana Molinari
- Maxillaria jamesonii (Rchb.f.) Garay & C.Schweinf.
- Maxillaria janiceae Christenson
- Maxillaria jenischiana (Rchb.f.) C.Schweinf.
- Maxillaria johannis Pabst
- Maxillaria johannyae Molinari
- Maxillaria johniana Kraenzl.
- Maxillaria jose-schunkei (Lipinska & Szlach.) J.M.H.Shaw
- Maxillaria jostii Dodson
- Maxillaria jucunda F.Lehm. & Kraenzl.
- Maxillaria kautskyi Pabst
- Maxillaria kefersteinioides (Szlach. & Lipinska) Molinari
- Maxillaria kegelii Rchb.f.
- Maxillaria kelloffiana Christenson
- Maxillaria kolanowskana Molinari
- Maxillaria lamprochlamys (Schltr.) P.Ortiz
- Maxillaria lankesteri Ames
- Maxillaria laricina Kraenzl.
- Maxillaria lasallei Foldats
- Maxillaria lawrenceana (Rolfe) Garay & Dunst.
- Maxillaria leforii D.E.Benn. & Christenson
- Maxillaria lehmannii Rchb.f.
- Maxillaria lepidota Lindl.
- Maxillaria leptopus Schuit. & M.W.Chase
- Maxillaria leptosepala Hook.
- Maxillaria leucaimata Barb.Rodr.
- Maxillaria leucopurpurea D.E.Benn. & Christenson
- Maxillaria lexarzana Soto Arenas & F.Chiang
- Maxillaria lilacea Barb.Rodr.
- Maxillaria lilliputana D.E.Benn. & Christenson
- Maxillaria lindeniae Cogn.
- Maxillaria linearifolia Ames & C.Schweinf.
- Maxillaria linearis C.Schweinf.
- Maxillaria lineolata (Fenzl) Molinari
- Maxillaria lipinskae J.M.H.Shaw
- Maxillaria litensis Dodson
- Maxillaria longibracteata (Lindl.) Rchb.f.
- Maxillaria longicolumna J.T.Atwood
- Maxillaria longiloba (Ames & C.Schweinf.) J.T.Atwood
- Maxillaria longipes Lindl.
- Maxillaria longipetala Ruiz & Pav.
- Maxillaria longipetiolata Ames & C.Schweinf.
- Maxillaria longissima Lindl.
- Maxillaria lueri Dodson
- Maxillaria luisae Molinari
- Maxillaria luteoalba Lindl.
- Maxillaria luteobrunnea (Kraenzl.) P.Ortiz
- Maxillaria luteograndiflora Dombrain
- Maxillaria lutescens Scheidw.
- Maxillaria lutheri J.T.Atwood
- Maxillaria machinazensis D.E.Benn. & Christenson
- Maxillaria machupicchuensis Christenson & N.Salinas
- Maxillaria macleei Bateman ex Lindl.
- Maxillaria macrantha (Barb.Rodr.) Molinari
- Maxillaria macropoda Schltr.
- Maxillaria macrura Rchb.f.
- Maxillaria maderoi Schltr.
- Maxillaria magliana Molinari
- Maxillaria maleolens Schltr.
- Maxillaria mapiriensis (Kraenzl.) L.O.Williams
- Maxillaria marginata (Lindl.) Fenzl
- Maxillaria margretiae R.Vásquez
- Maxillaria maria-luisae J.S.Moreno, P.A.Harding & L.Pina
- Maxillaria mariaisabeliae J.T.Atwood
- Maxillaria mathewsii Lindl.
- Maxillaria mejiae Carnevali & G.A.Romero
- Maxillaria meleagris Lindl.
- Maxillaria melina Lindl.
- Maxillaria merana Dodson
- Maxillaria meridensis Lindl.
- Maxillaria microblephara Schltr.
- Maxillaria microdendron Schltr.
- Maxillaria microiridifolia D.E.Benn. & Christenson
- Maxillaria microphyton Schltr.
- Maxillaria microtricha Schltr.
- Maxillaria milenae V.P.Castro & Chiron
- Maxillaria miniata (Lindl.) L.O.Williams
- Maxillaria minus (Schltr.) L.O.Williams
- Maxillaria minutiflora D.E.Benn. & Christenson
- Maxillaria mirabilis Cogn.
- Maxillaria misasii Christenson
- Maxillaria modesta Schltr.
- Maxillaria molitor Rchb.f.
- Maxillaria mombachoensis A.H.Heller ex J.T.Atwood
- Maxillaria monacensis Kraenzl.
- Maxillaria monantha Barb.Rodr.
- Maxillaria monteverdensis J.T.Atwood & Barboza
- Maxillaria montezumae (Arévalo & Christenson) Molinari
- Maxillaria moralesii Carnevali & J.T.Atwood
- Maxillaria mosenii Kraenzl.
- Maxillaria moutinhoi Pabst
- Maxillaria muelleri Regel
- Maxillaria multicaulis (Poepp. & Endl.) C.Schweinf.
- Maxillaria multifoliata Molinari
- Maxillaria mungoschraderi R.Vásquez & Ibisch
- Maxillaria muscicola Rchb.f.
- Maxillaria muscoides J.T.Atwood
- Maxillaria mystkowskana Molinari
- Maxillaria nagelii L.O.Williams ex Correll
- Maxillaria nanegalensis Rchb.f.
- Maxillaria napoensis Dodson
- Maxillaria nardoides Kraenzl.
- Maxillaria nasuta Rchb.f.
- Maxillaria neglecta (Schltr.) L.O.Williams
- Maxillaria neillii Dodson
- Maxillaria nellyae Molinari
- Maxillaria neophylla Rchb.f.
- Maxillaria neowiedii Rchb.f.
- Maxillaria nicaraguensis (Hamer & Garay) J.T.Atwood
- Maxillaria niesseniae Christenson
- Maxillaria nigrescens Lindl.
- Maxillaria nigrolabia Christenson
- Maxillaria nitidula Rchb.f.
- Maxillaria nivea (Lindl.) L.O.Williams
- Maxillaria notylioglossa Rchb.f.
- Maxillaria novoae Molinari
- Maxillaria nubigena (Rchb.f.) C.Schweinf.
- Maxillaria nuriensis Carnevali & I.Ramírez
- Maxillaria nutans Lindl.
- Maxillaria nutantiflora Schltr.
- Maxillaria nymphopolitana Kraenzl.
- Maxillaria oakes-amesiana Schuit. & M.W.Chase
- Maxillaria obscura Linden & Rchb.f.
- Maxillaria obtusa (Lindl.) Molinari
- Maxillaria ochroglossa Schltr.
- Maxillaria ochroleuca Lodd. ex Lindl.
- Maxillaria oestlundiana L.O.Williams
- Maxillaria olivacea (Kraenzl.) P.Ortiz
- Maxillaria ophiodens J.T.Atwood
- Maxillaria oreocharis Schltr.
- Maxillaria ortizii Christenson
- Maxillaria osmantha H.Barbosa
- Maxillaria oxapampensis J.T.Atwood
- Maxillaria pacholskii Christenson
- Maxillaria pachyacron Schltr.
- Maxillaria pachyneura F.Lehm. & Kraenzl.
- Maxillaria pachyphylla Schltr. ex Hoehne
- Maxillaria paleata (Rchb.f.) Ames & Correll
- Maxillaria palmensis Dodson
- Maxillaria pamplonensis Linden & Rchb.f.
- Maxillaria pannieri Foldats
- Maxillaria paranaensis Barb.Rodr.
- Maxillaria pardalina Garay
- Maxillaria paredesiorum (Archila & Chiron) Molinari
- Maxillaria parkeri Hook.
- Maxillaria parvibulbosa C.Schweinf.
- Maxillaria parviflora (Poepp. & Endl.) Garay
- Maxillaria parvilabia Ames & C.Schweinf.
- Maxillaria parviloba Rolfe
- Maxillaria pastensis Rchb.f.
- Maxillaria pastorellii D.E.Benn. & Christenson
- Maxillaria patens Schltr.
- Maxillaria patula C.Schweinf.
- Maxillaria pauciflora Barb.Rodr.
- Maxillaria pendens Pabst
- Maxillaria pendula (Poepp. & Endl.) C.Schweinf.
- Maxillaria pentura Lindl.
- Maxillaria pereziana (Rodr.-Mart. & M.A.Blanco) Schuit. & M.W.Chase
- Maxillaria pergracilis (Schltr.) Schuit. & M.W.Chase
- Maxillaria perryae Dodson
- Maxillaria perulera Molinari
- Maxillaria peruviana (C.Schweinf.) D.E.Benn. & Christenson
- Maxillaria petiolaris Schltr.
- Maxillaria pfisteri Sauvêtre
- Maxillaria pfitzeri Senghas
- Maxillaria phaeoglossa Schltr.
- Maxillaria phoenicanthera Barb.Rodr.
- Maxillaria picta Hook.
- Maxillaria pinasensis Zambrano & Solano
- Maxillaria pinoides (H.R.Sweet) Molinari
- Maxillaria piresiana Hoehne
- Maxillaria pittieri (Ames) L.O.Williams
- Maxillaria planicola C.Schweinf.
- Maxillaria platyloba Schltr.
- Maxillaria platypetala Ruiz & Pav.
- Maxillaria pleiantha Schltr.
- Maxillaria pleuranthoides (Schltr.) Garay
- Maxillaria plicata Schltr.
- Maxillaria podochila Kraenzl.
- Maxillaria poeppigiana Steud.
- Maxillaria poicilothece Schltr.
- Maxillaria poifolia Schltr.
- Maxillaria polyantha Barb.Rodr.
- Maxillaria polybulbon Kraenzl.
- Maxillaria ponerantha Rchb.f.
- Maxillaria porphyrostele Rchb.f.
- Maxillaria porrecta Lindl.
- Maxillaria postarinoi Molinari
- Maxillaria powellii Schltr.
- Maxillaria praestans Rchb.f.
- Maxillaria praetexta Rchb.f.
- Maxillaria proboscidea Rchb.f.
- Maxillaria procurrens Lindl.
- Maxillaria prolifera Ruiz & Pav.
- Maxillaria prunina (Arévalo) Molinari & Mayta
- Maxillaria pseudobulbosa (C.Schweinf.) Molinari
- Maxillaria pseudoneglecta J.T.Atwood
- Maxillaria pseudonubigena J.T.Atwood
- Maxillaria pseudopicta Rysy & Baumbach
- Maxillaria pseudoreichenheimiana Dodson
- Maxillaria pterocarpa Barb.Rodr.
- Maxillaria pubicolumna Szlach., Kolan., Lipinska & Medina Tr.
- Maxillaria pudica Carnevali & J.L.Tapia
- Maxillaria pulchra (Schltr.) L.O.Williams ex Correll
- Maxillaria pulla Linden & Rchb.f.
- Maxillaria pumila Hook.
- Maxillaria purpurata (Lindl.) Rchb.f.
- Maxillaria purpureolabia D.E.Benn. & Christenson
- Maxillaria purpureonigra Zambrano, Carnevali & Solano
- Maxillaria pustulosa J.T.Atwood
- Maxillaria pyhalae D.E.Benn. & Christenson
- Maxillaria quadrata Ames & Correll
- Maxillaria quelchii Rolfe
- Maxillaria quercicola (Schltr.) P.Ortiz
- Maxillaria quitensis (Rchb.f.) C.Schweinf.
- Maxillaria raimondiana Molinari
- Maxillaria ramiro-medinae Szlach., Kolan. & Lipinska
- Maxillaria ramonensis Schltr.
- Maxillaria ramosissima Kraenzl.
- Maxillaria rauhii D.E.Benn. & Christenson
- Maxillaria regeliana Cogn.
- Maxillaria reichenheimiana Endrés & Rchb.f.
- Maxillaria repens L.O.Williams
- Maxillaria rhodoleuca (Schltr.) P.Ortiz
- Maxillaria rhombea Lindl.
- Maxillaria rhomboglossa (F.Lehm. & Kraenzl.) Molinari
- Maxillaria richii Dodson
- Maxillaria rigida Barb.Rodr.
- Maxillaria ringens Rchb.f.
- Maxillaria riopalenquensis Dodson
- Maxillaria rodriguesii Cogn.
- Maxillaria rodrigueziana J.T.Atwood & Mora-Ret.
- Maxillaria roseans (Schltr.) Molinari
- Maxillaria roseola Christenson
- Maxillaria rotundilabia C.Schweinf.
- Maxillaria ruberrima (Lindl.) Garay
- Maxillaria rubioi Dodson
- Maxillaria rubroglossa Szlach., Kolan., Lipinska & Medina Tr.
- Maxillaria rufescens Lindl.
- Maxillaria sanaensis D.E.Benn. & Christenson
- Maxillaria sanantonioensis Christenson
- Maxillaria sanderiana Rchb.f. ex Sander
- Maxillaria sanguinea Rolfe
- Maxillaria sanguineomaculata Schltr.
- Maxillaria sanguinolenta (Lindl.) C.Schweinf.
- Maxillaria santanae Carnevali & I.Ramírez
- Maxillaria saragurensis Dodson
- Maxillaria saueri Christenson
- Maxillaria saxicola Schltr.
- Maxillaria scalariformis J.T.Atwood
- Maxillaria scandens D.E.Benn. & Christenson
- Maxillaria schistostele Schltr.
- Maxillaria schlechteri Foldats
- Maxillaria schlechteriana J.T.Atwood
- Maxillaria schlimii (Linden & Rchb.f.) Molinari
- Maxillaria schnitteri Schltr.
- Maxillaria schultesii (Ojeda & G.A.Romero) Christenson
- Maxillaria schultzei Schltr.
- Maxillaria schunkeana Campacci & Kautsky
- Maxillaria schweinfurthiana (Garay & M.Wirth) Molinari
- Maxillaria sciabolata Molinari
- Maxillaria scorpioidea Kraenzl.
- Maxillaria sculliana J.T.Atwood
- Maxillaria seidelii Pabst
- Maxillaria semiscabra (Lindl.) P.Ortiz
- Maxillaria serrulata Ames & Correll
- Maxillaria sessilis Lindl.
- Maxillaria setigera Lindl.
- Maxillaria sibundoyensis Szlach., Kolan., Lipinska & Medina Tr.
- Maxillaria sigmoidea (C.Schweinf.) Ames & Correll
- Maxillaria sillarensis Dodson & R.Vásquez
- Maxillaria silvana Campacci
- Maxillaria silverstonei (Carnevali) Molinari
- Maxillaria simacoana Schltr.
- Maxillaria simplicilabia C.Schweinf.
- Maxillaria soconuscana Breedlove & Mally
- Maxillaria sodiroi (Schltr.) Senghas
- Maxillaria sophronitis (Rchb.f.) Garay
- Maxillaria sotoana Carnevali & Gómez-Juárez
- Maxillaria soulangeana Molinari
- Maxillaria speciosa Rchb.f.
- Maxillaria spilotantha Rchb.f.
- Maxillaria spiritu-sanctensis Pabst
- Maxillaria splendens Poepp. & Endl.
- Maxillaria squarrosa (Schltr.) Dodson
- Maxillaria standleyi (Ames) Molinari
- Maxillaria sterrocaulos (Schltr.) P.Ortiz
- Maxillaria stictantha Schltr.
- Maxillaria striata Rolfe
- Maxillaria stricta Schltr.
- Maxillaria strictifolia P.Ortiz
- Maxillaria strictissima (Kraenzl.) P.Ortiz
- Maxillaria striolata D.E.Benn. & Christenson
- Maxillaria strumata (Endrés & Rchb.f.) Ames & Correll
- Maxillaria stumpflei (Garay) Molinari
- Maxillaria suareziorum Dodson
- Maxillaria suaveolens Barringer
- Maxillaria subpandurata Schltr.
- Maxillaria subrepens (Rolfe) Schuit. & M.W.Chase
- Maxillaria subulata Lindl.
- Maxillaria subulifolia Schltr.
- Maxillaria sulfurea Schltr.
- Maxillaria superflua Rchb.f.
- Maxillaria swartziana C.D.Adams
- Maxillaria synsepala J.T.Atwood
- Maxillaria szlachetkoi Molinari
- Maxillaria tagianarae Molinari
- Maxillaria tectasepala Christenson
- Maxillaria tenebrifolia Arévalo & Christenson
- Maxillaria tenebrosa Zambrano & Solano
- Maxillaria tenuibulba Christenson
- Maxillaria tenuifolia Lindl.
- Maxillaria tenuis C.Schweinf.
- Maxillaria thurstoniorum Dodson
- Maxillaria tiaraensis Carnevali & G.A.Romero
- Maxillaria tigrina C.Schweinf.
- Maxillaria tocotana Schltr.
- Maxillaria tonduzii (Schltr.) Ames & Correll
- Maxillaria tonsbergii Christenson
- Maxillaria tonsoniae Soto Arenas
- Maxillaria torifera (Schltr.) P.Ortiz
- Maxillaria tricarinata J.T.Atwood
- Maxillaria tricolor Ruiz & Pav.
- Maxillaria trigona C.Schweinf.
- Maxillaria trilobata Ames & Correll
- Maxillaria trilobulata D.E.Benn. & Christenson
- Maxillaria tristis Schltr.
- Maxillaria truncatilabia Schltr.
- Maxillaria tubercularis J.T.Atwood
- Maxillaria tuerosii D.E.Benn. & Christenson
- Maxillaria turbinata (Rchb.f.) Molinari
- Maxillaria turkeliae Christenson
- Maxillaria tutae J.T.Atwood
- Maxillaria ubatubana Hoehne
- Maxillaria umbratilis L.O.Williams
- Maxillaria uncata Lindl.
- Maxillaria unguiculata Schltr.
- Maxillaria unguilabia Schltr.
- Maxillaria unicarinata C.Schweinf.
- Maxillaria uniflora (Ruiz & Pav.) Molinari
- Maxillaria urbaniana F.Lehm. & Kraenzl.
- Maxillaria vaginalis Rchb.f.
- Maxillaria valenzuelana (A.Rich.) Nash
- Maxillaria valerioi Ames & C.Schweinf.
- Maxillaria vallecaucana (Kolan., Lipinska & Szlach.) J.M.H.Shaw
- Maxillaria valleculata D.E.Benn. & Christenson
- Maxillaria vallisnerioides Christenson
- Maxillaria vanderwerffii (Szlach. & Lipinska) Molinari
- Maxillaria vanillosma Christenson
- Maxillaria variabilis Bateman ex Lindl.
- Maxillaria vasquezii Christenson
- Maxillaria ventricosa (Sambin & Chiron) Molinari
- Maxillaria venusta Linden & Rchb.f.
- Maxillaria verecunda Schltr.
- Maxillaria vestita Schltr.
- Maxillaria villonacensis Dodson
- Maxillaria villosa (Barb.Rodr.) Cogn.
- Maxillaria violaceopunctata Rchb.f.
- Maxillaria virguncula Rchb.f.
- Maxillaria visseri D.E.Benn. & Christenson
- Maxillaria vittariifolia L.O.Williams
- Maxillaria vulcanica F.Lehm. & Kraenzl.
- Maxillaria weberbaueri Schltr.
- Maxillaria wercklei (Schltr.) L.O.Williams
- Maxillaria whittenii Dodson
- Maxillaria winaywaynaensis D.E.Benn. & Christenson
- Maxillaria witsenioides Schltr.
- Maxillaria wojii Christenson
- Maxillaria woytkowskii C.Schweinf.
- Maxillaria xantholeuca Schltr.
- Maxillaria xanthorhoda Schltr.
- Maxillaria xylobiiflora Schltr.
- Maxillaria yanganensis Dodson
- Maxillaria yauaperyensis Barb.Rodr.
- Maxillaria × yucatanensis Carnevali & R.Jiménez
