= M. crocea =

M. crocea may refer to:

- Malephora crocea, a flowering plant
- Mantella crocea, a frog endemic to Madagascar
- Maxillaria crocea, a South American orchid
- Mentzelia crocea, an annual wildflower
- Mitra crocea, a sea snail
- Murdannia crocea, a flowering plant
- Mylothris crocea, an African butterfly
