= H. petiolaris =

H. petiolaris may refer to:

- Hakea petiolaris, the sea-urchin hakea, a shrub or small tree species endemic to the south-west of Western Australia
- Helianthus petiolaris, the prairie sunflower, a plant species in the genus Helianthus
- Hydrangea petiolaris, a species native to the woodlands of Japan, Korea and Sakhalin in easternmost Siberia
- Hylaeorchis petiolaris, a synonym of Maxillaria petiolaris

== See also ==
- Petiolaris (disambiguation)
