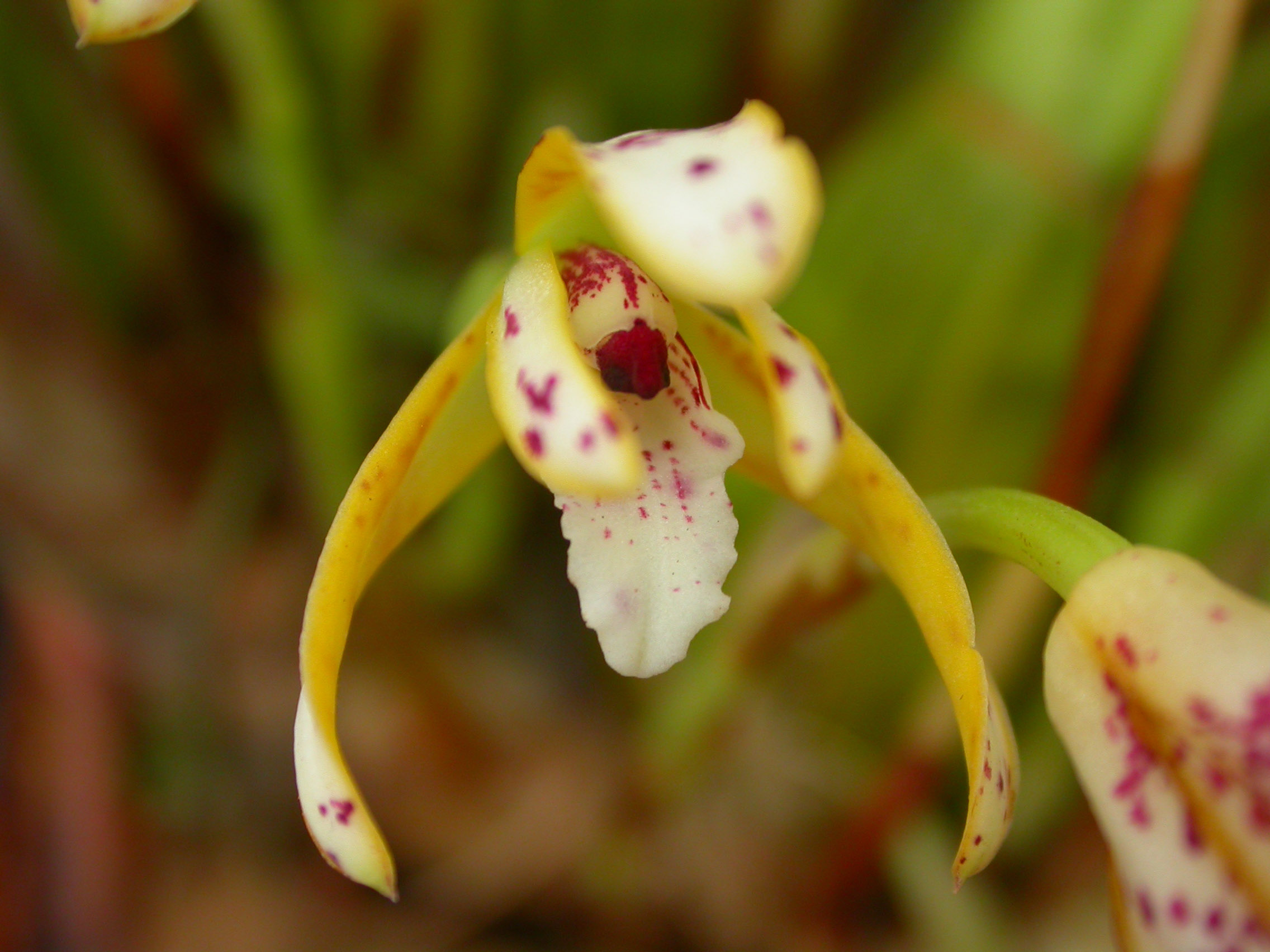

Scientific classification
- Kingdom: Plantae
- Clade: Tracheophytes
- Clade: Angiosperms
- Clade: Monocots
- Order: Asparagales
- Family: Orchidaceae
- Subfamily: Epidendroideae
- Genus: Maxillaria
- Species: M. picta

Binomial name
- Maxillaria picta Hook.

Synonyms
- Bolbidium pictum (Hook.) J.M.H.Shaw; Brasiliorchis picta (Hook.) R.B.Singer, S.Koehler & Carnevali; Brasiliorchis rupestris (Barb.Rodr.) Szlach. & Sitko; Epidendrum uniflorum Vell.; Maxillaria acutipetala Hook.; Maxillaria hoehnei Schltr.; Maxillaria kreysigii Rchb.f. ex Beer; Maxillaria kreysigii Hoffmanns. ex Regel, nom. illeg.; Maxillaria leucocheile Hoffmanns; Maxillaria picta var. rupestris (Barb.Rodr.) Cogn.; Maxillaria picta-major Hook. ex F.Buyss.; Maxillaria rupestris Barb.Rodr.; Maxillaria rupestris var. minor Hoehne

= Maxillaria picta =

Species of orchid

Maxillaria picta is a species of plant in the orchid family native to Brazil, Paraguay and Argentina.
