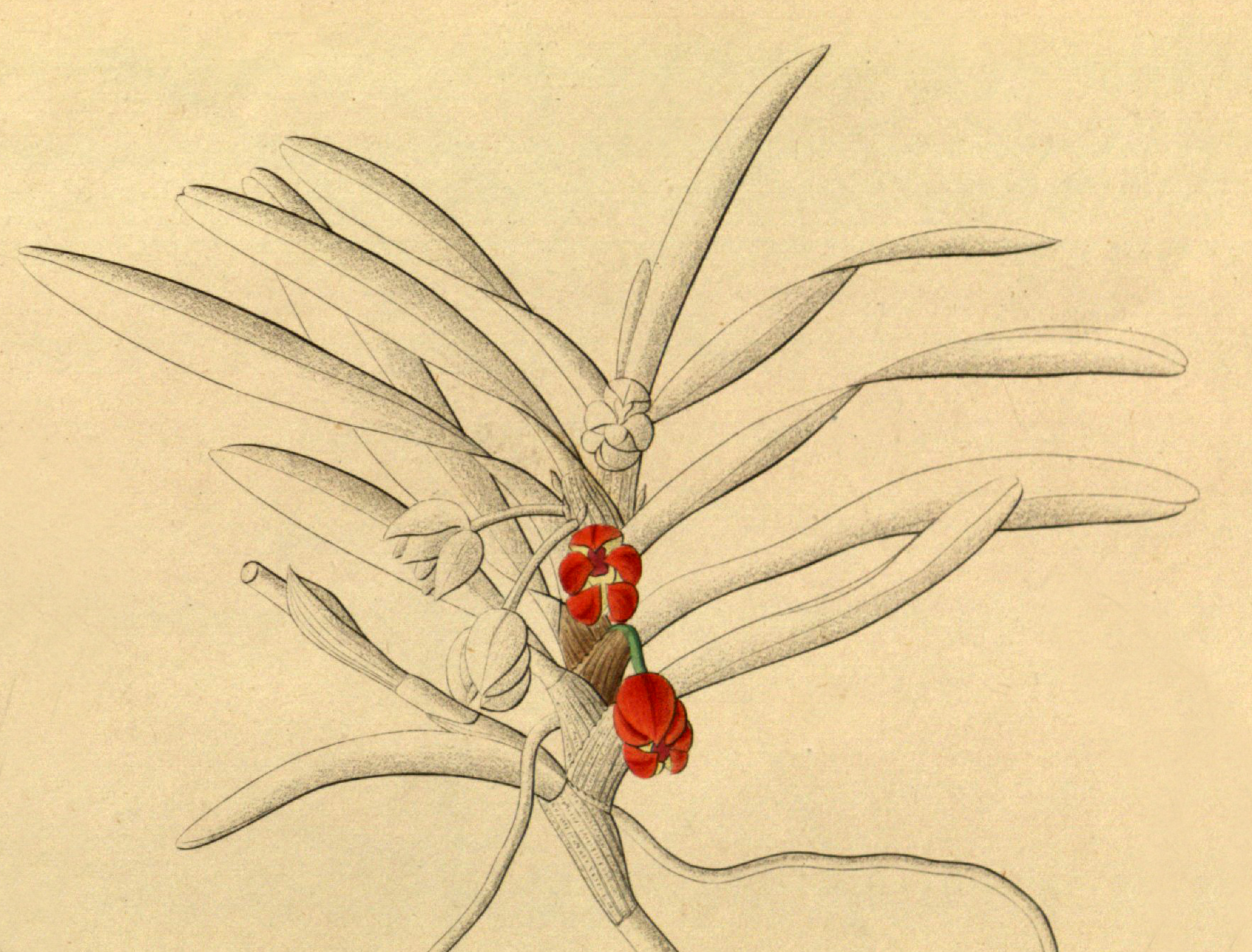
- 1858 illustration

Scientific classification
- Kingdom: Plantae
- Clade: Embryophytes
- Clade: Tracheophytes
- Clade: Spermatophytes
- Clade: Angiosperms
- Clade: Monocots
- Order: Asparagales
- Family: Orchidaceae
- Subfamily: Epidendroideae
- Genus: Maxillaria
- Species: M. jenischiana

Binomial name
- Maxillaria jenischiana (Rchb.f.) Lindl.

Synonyms
- Ornithidium jenischianum Rchb.f. (basionym)

= Maxillaria jenischiana =

Species of orchid

Maxillaria jenischiana is a species of orchid endemic to Venezuela and northwestern Colombia. The orchid is an epiphyte.
