= Maxillaria sanantonioensis =

Scientific classification
- Kingdom: Plantae
- Clade: Tracheophytes
- Clade: Angiosperms
- Clade: Monocots
- Order: Asparagales
- Family: Orchidaceae
- Subfamily: Epidendroideae
- Genus: Maxillaria
- Species: M. sanantonioensis

Binomial name
- Maxillaria sanantonioensis Christenson

Species of orchid native to Colombia

Maxillaria sanantonioensis is a species of epiphytic orchid native to Colombia.

== Etymology ==
This species was named for the San Antonio region of Cali, Colombia.
