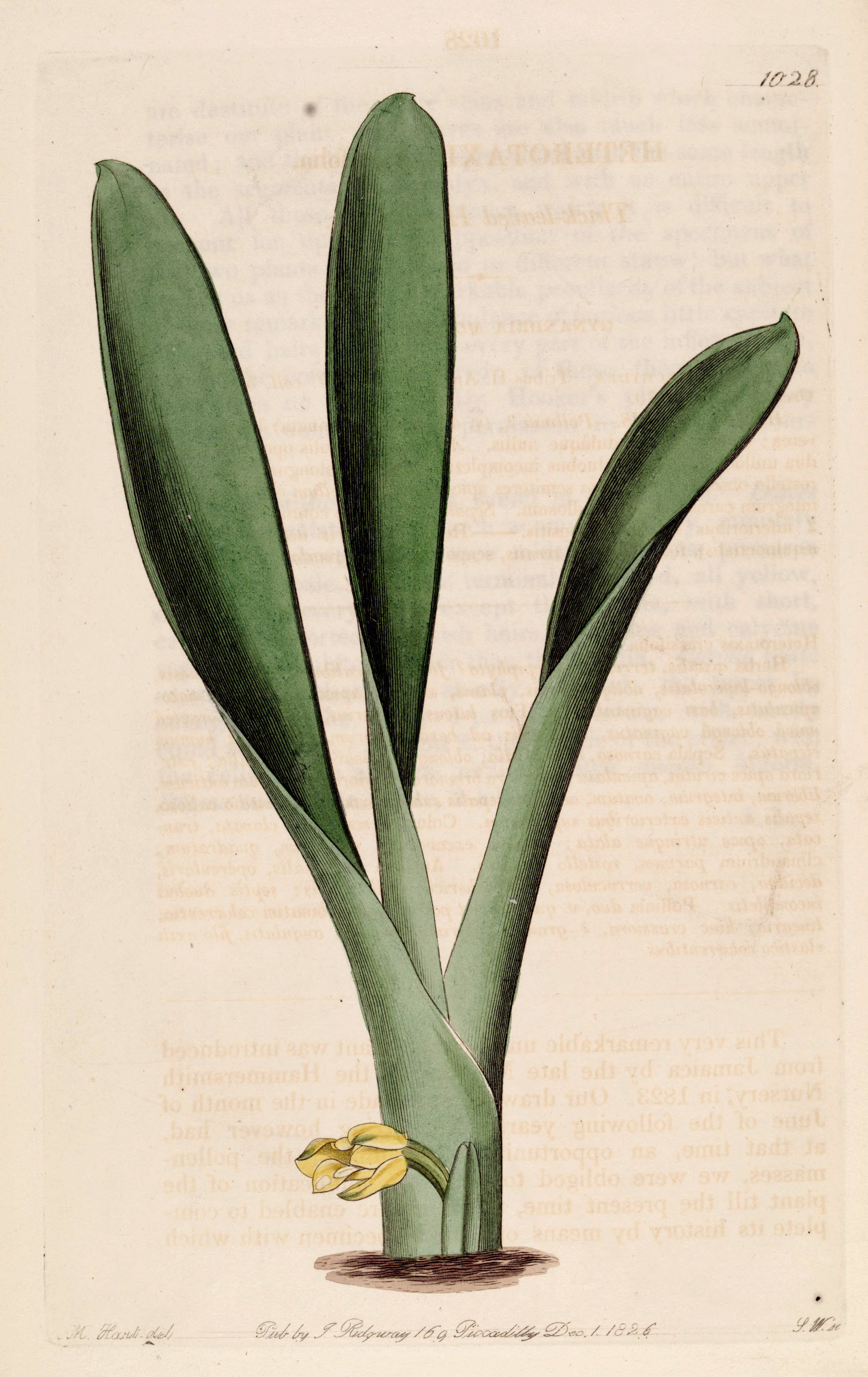
- 1826 illustration

Scientific classification
- Kingdom: Plantae
- Clade: Tracheophytes
- Clade: Angiosperms
- Clade: Monocots
- Order: Asparagales
- Family: Orchidaceae
- Subfamily: Epidendroideae
- Genus: Maxillaria
- Species: M. crassifolia

Binomial name
- Maxillaria crassifolia (Lindl.) Rchb.f.

Synonyms
- Dicrypta baueri Lindl.; Dicrypta crassifolia (Lindl.) Loudon; Epidendrum sessile Sw.; Heterotaxis crassifolia Lindl.; Heterotaxis gatunensis (Schltr.) Szlach. & Sitko; Heterotaxis sessilis (Sw.) F.Barros; Maxillaria gatunensis Schltr.; Maxillaria sessilis (Sw.) Fawc. & Rendle, nom. illeg.

= Maxillaria crassifolia =

Hidden orchid

Species of orchid

Maxillaria crassifolia, synonyms including Heterotaxis sessilis, is an epiphytic orchid widespread across the West Indies (Cuba, Hispaniola, Jamaica, Trinidad), Central America (all 7 countries), southern Mexico (Chiapas, Veracruz, Oaxaca, Quintana Roo), Florida and northern South America (Colombia, Ecuador, Peru, northern Brazil, Venezuela, the Guianas). Hidden orchid is a common name.

Some molecular studies have suggested that Maxillaria should be split into several genera, with this species moved to Heterotaxis, but as of August 2023, Plants of the World Online treats Heterotaxis as a synonym of Maxillaria.
