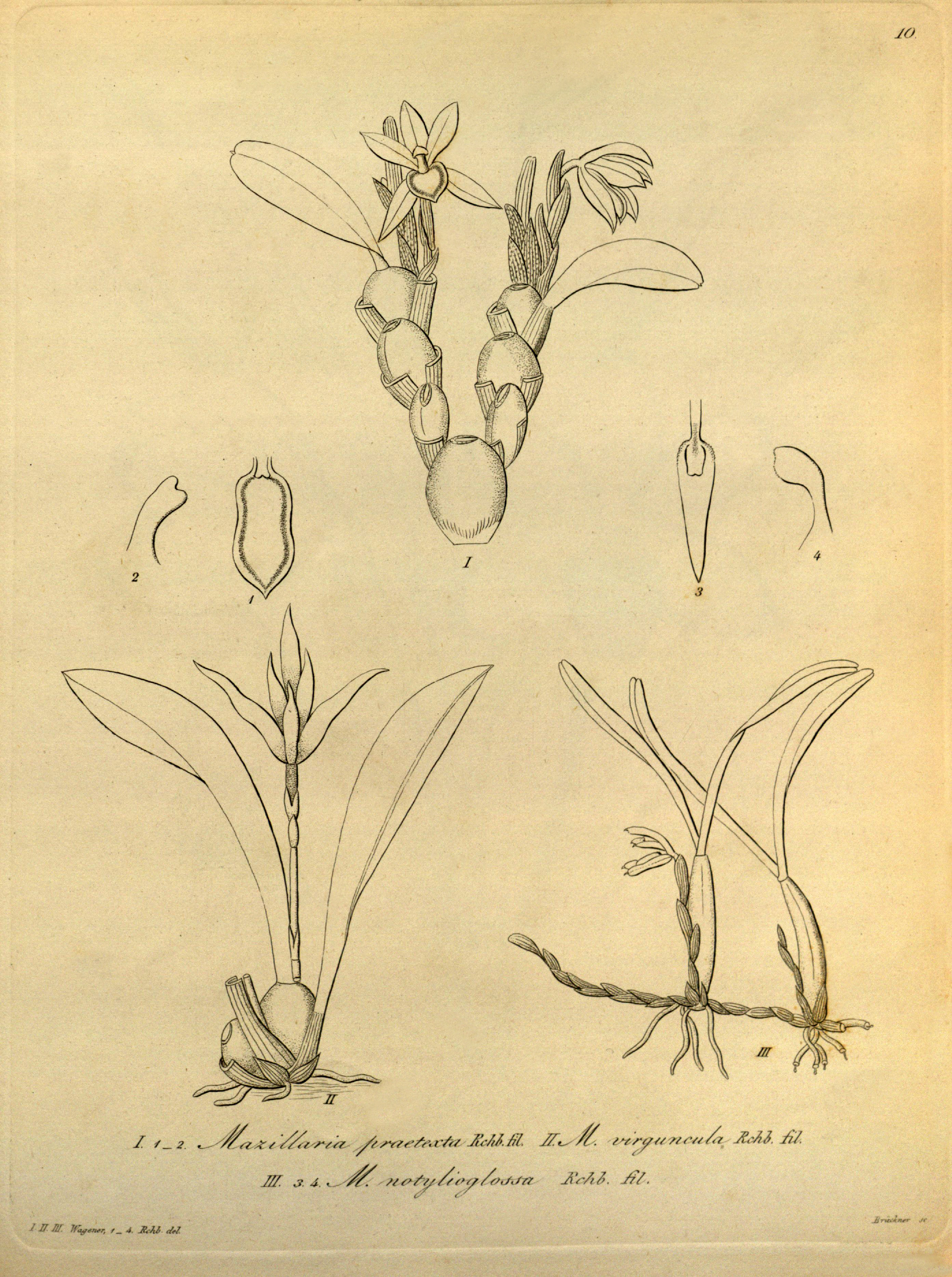
- Maxillaria praetexta (I)

Scientific classification
- Kingdom: Plantae
- Clade: Tracheophytes
- Clade: Angiosperms
- Clade: Monocots
- Order: Asparagales
- Family: Orchidaceae
- Subfamily: Epidendroideae
- Genus: Maxillaria
- Species: M. praetexta

Binomial name
- Maxillaria praetexta Rchb.f.

= Maxillaria praetexta =

Species of orchid

Maxillaria praetexta is a species of orchid endemic to Venezuela (Carabobo).
