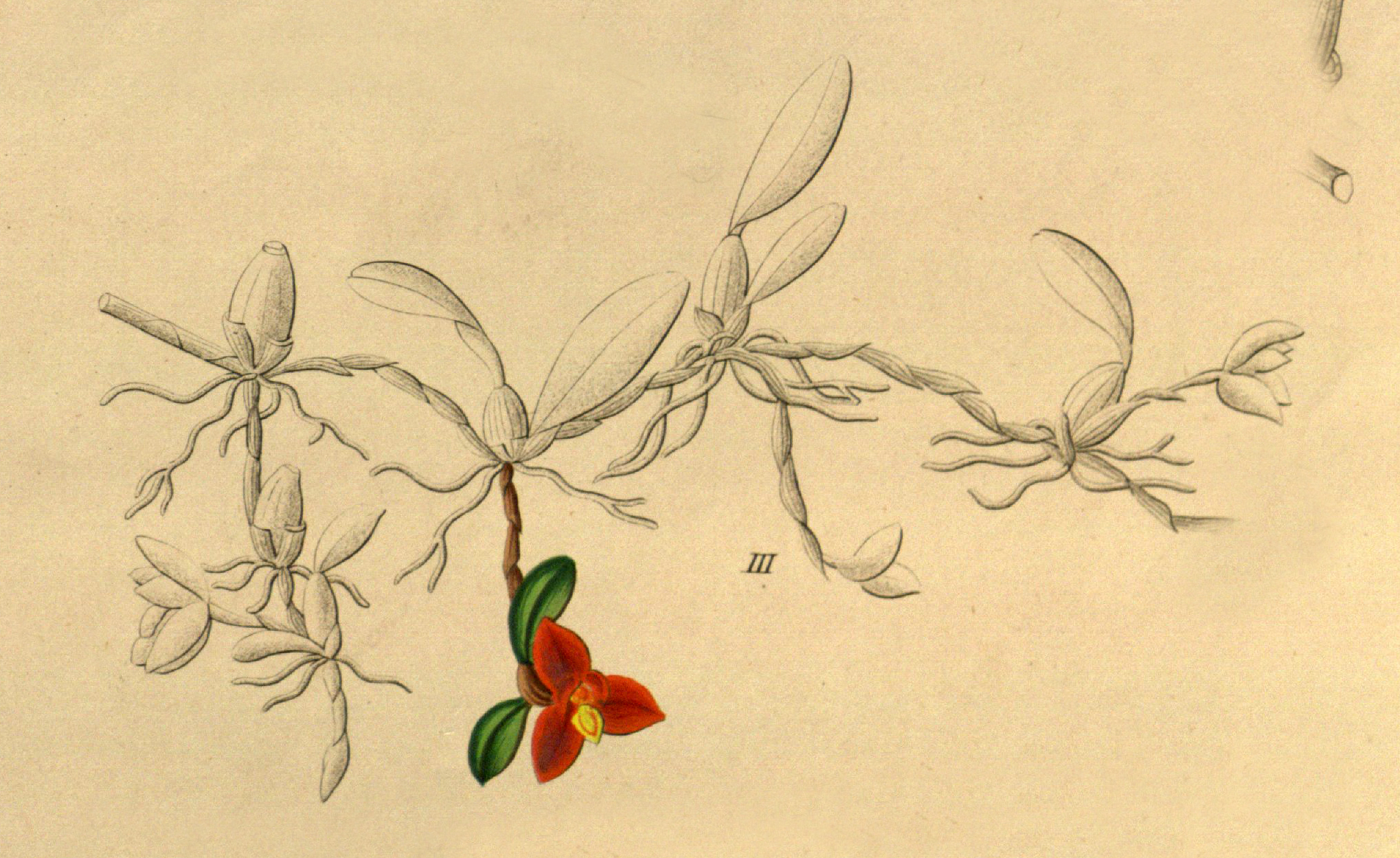

Scientific classification
- Kingdom: Plantae
- Clade: Tracheophytes
- Clade: Angiosperms
- Clade: Monocots
- Order: Asparagales
- Family: Orchidaceae
- Subfamily: Epidendroideae
- Genus: Maxillaria
- Species: M. sophronitis

Binomial name
- Maxillaria sophronitis (Rchb.f.) Garay

Synonyms
- Ornithidium sophronitis Rchb.f. (basionym); Maxillaria ruberrima var. sophronitis (Rchb.f.) M.Wolff & O.Gruss

= Maxillaria sophronitis =

Species of orchid

Maxillaria sophronitis, the sophronitis-like maxillaria, is a species of orchid found in Venezuela and northeastern Colombia.
