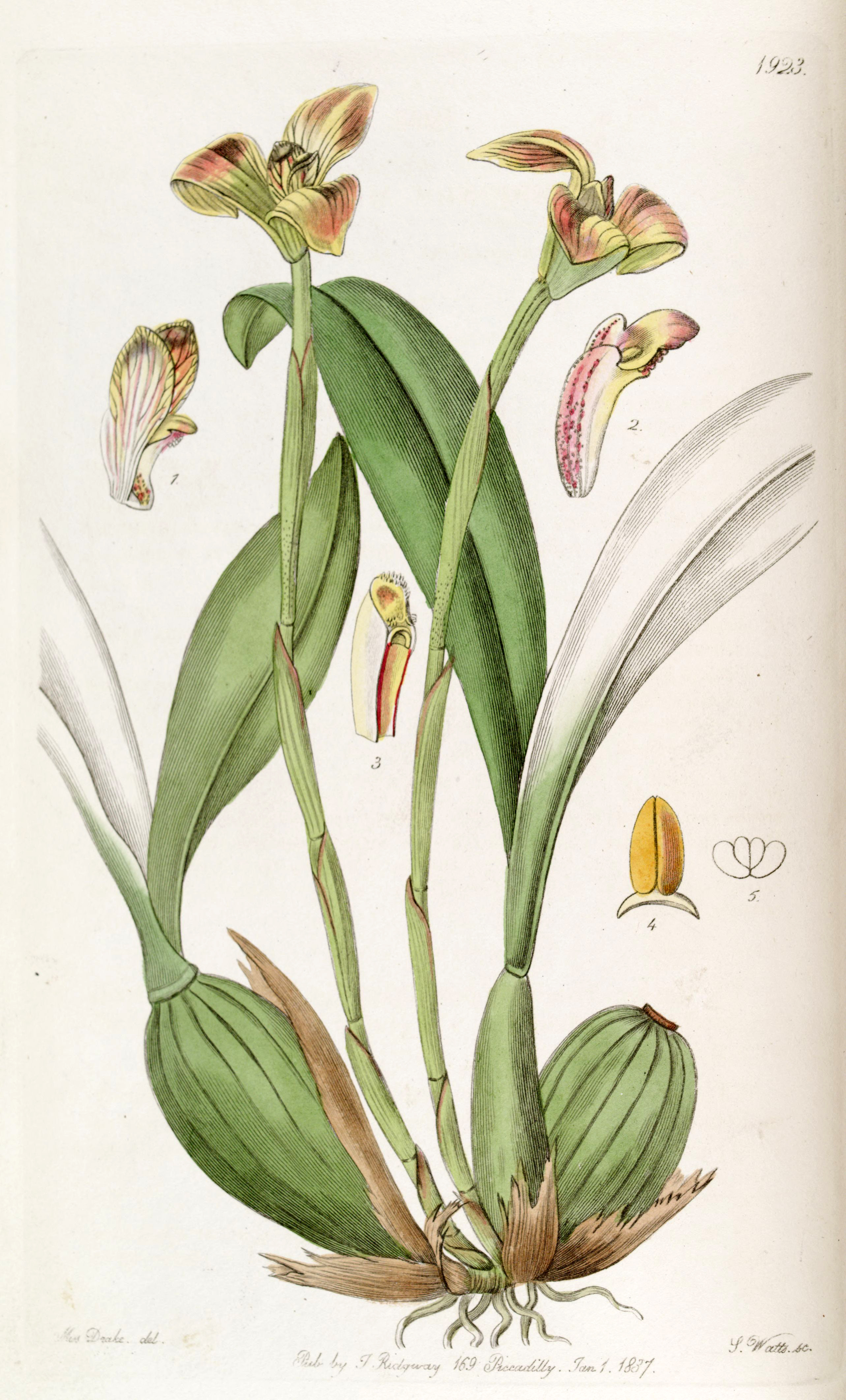

Scientific classification
- Kingdom: Plantae
- Clade: Tracheophytes
- Clade: Angiosperms
- Clade: Monocots
- Order: Asparagales
- Family: Orchidaceae
- Subfamily: Epidendroideae
- Genus: Maxillaria
- Species: M. obtusa

Binomial name
- Maxillaria obtusa (Lindl.) Molinari

Synonyms
- Trigonidium obtusum Lindl.

= Maxillaria obtusa =

Species of orchid

Maxillaria obtusa, synonym Trigonidium obtusum, is an orchid native to tropical South America.

== Description ==
Maxillaria obtusa is about 15 cm (5.9 in) tall with short flower stems. The pseudobulbs of the plant are compressed and oblong, with two lanceolate leaves. The scapes spring from the rhizome, and each scape ends with a single flower. The flower is yellowish to pinkish with purple veins and blue eyespots. The flower is approximately 1 cm (0.39 in) wide with sepals that are broader and taper less than other species. Flower development takes ten days, and flowers wither four to ten days after opening. During the hottest hours of the day, the flowers release a sweet fragrance similar to lemon. Pentadecane is the main component of the fragrance.

== Ecology ==
Male Plebeia droryana bees pollinate the flowers by performing pseudocopulation. Bees become trapped in the tubular orchid after being attracted by the sepals or petals of the flower. Two types Maxillaria obtusa flowers exist, one with attractive sepals and one with attractive petals. The flowers are morphologically identical besides the sepals and flowers, and most likely discourage self-pollination by hindering the process of bee learning. Pollination of M. obtusa is unique in the fact that pollination does not only require pseudocopulation but also trapping the male bee. Bees carrying pollinia occasionally revisit the same flower, but self-pollination does not occur. Though pentadecane produces the fragrance of the flower, pentadecane itself does not attract P. droryana bees.
