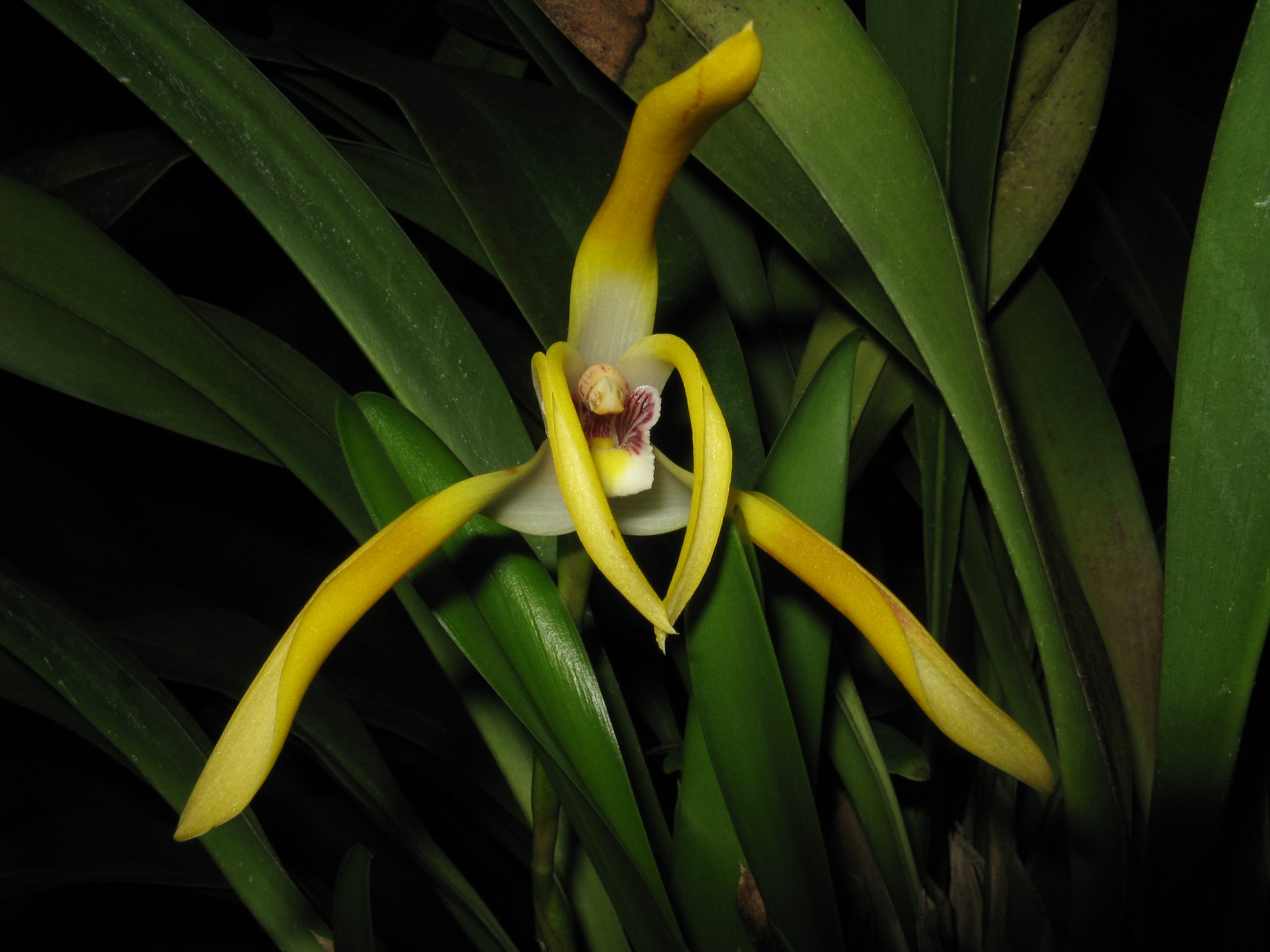

Scientific classification
- Kingdom: Plantae
- Clade: Tracheophytes
- Clade: Angiosperms
- Clade: Monocots
- Order: Asparagales
- Family: Orchidaceae
- Subfamily: Epidendroideae
- Genus: Maxillaria
- Species: M. longipetala

Binomial name
- Maxillaria longipetala Ruiz & Pav.

Synonyms
- Dendrobium longipetalum (Ruiz & Pav.) Pers.; Lycaste longipetala (Ruiz & Pav.) Garay); Sudamerlycaste longipetala (Ruiz & Pav.) Archila; Maxillaria triloris E.Morren

= Maxillaria longipetala =

Species of orchid

Maxillaria longipetala is a species of orchid native to Peru.
