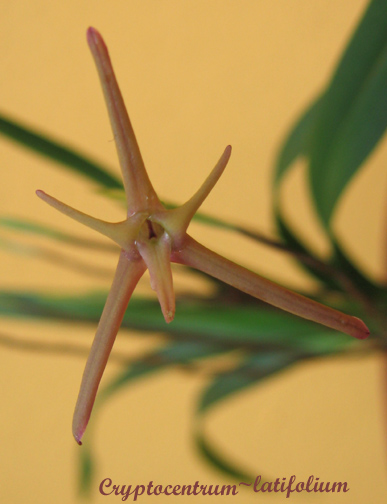

Scientific classification
- Kingdom: Plantae
- Clade: Tracheophytes
- Clade: Angiosperms
- Clade: Monocots
- Order: Asparagales
- Family: Orchidaceae
- Subfamily: Epidendroideae
- Genus: Maxillaria
- Species: M. amplifoliata

Binomial name
- Maxillaria amplifoliata Molinari

Synonyms
- Cryptocentrum latifolium Schltr.; Cryptocentrum latifolium var. brachypetalum Garay

= Maxillaria amplifoliata =

Species of orchid

Maxillaria amplifoliata is a member of the family Orchidaceae. It was previously in the genus Cryptocentrum, in which it was the largest species. Cryptocentrum is now synonymous with Maxillaria.
