= Maxillaria elluziae =

Scientific classification
- Kingdom: Plantae
- Clade: Tracheophytes
- Clade: Angiosperms
- Clade: Monocots
- Order: Asparagales
- Family: Orchidaceae
- Subfamily: Epidendroideae
- Genus: Maxillaria
- Species: M. elluziae

Binomial name
- Maxillaria elluziae Molinari

Synonyms
- Trigonidium latifolium Lindl.

Species of flowering plant

Maxillaria elluziae is an orchid of the genus Maxillaria.
