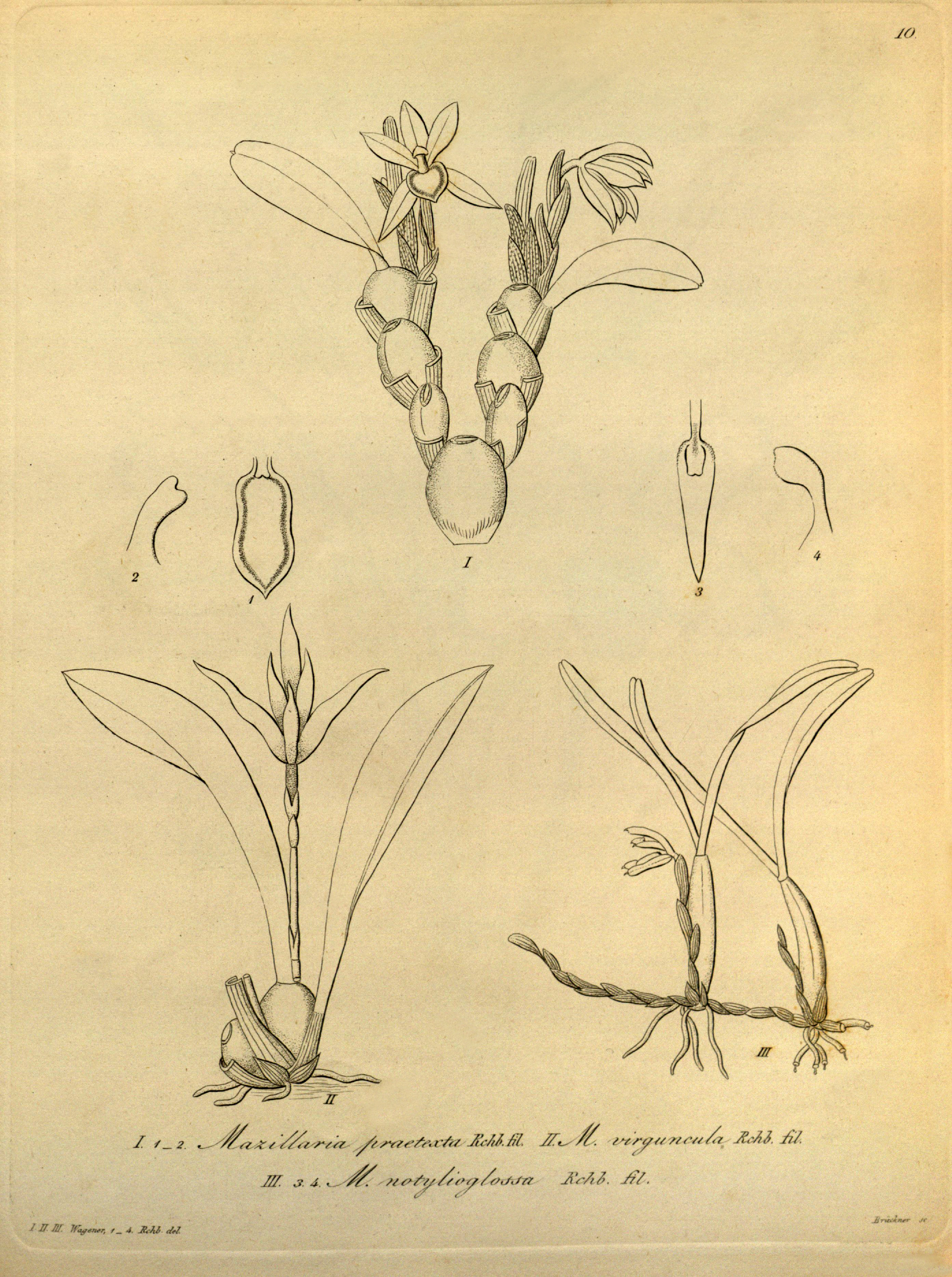
- Maxillaria virguncula (II)

Scientific classification
- Kingdom: Plantae
- Clade: Tracheophytes
- Clade: Angiosperms
- Clade: Monocots
- Order: Asparagales
- Family: Orchidaceae
- Subfamily: Epidendroideae
- Genus: Maxillaria
- Species: M. virguncula

Binomial name
- Maxillaria virguncula Rchb.f.

Synonyms
- Maxillaria attenuata Ames & C.Schweinf.; Maxillaria guadalupensis Cogn.

= Maxillaria virguncula =

Species of orchid

Maxillaria virguncula is a species of orchid found throughout Tropical America.
