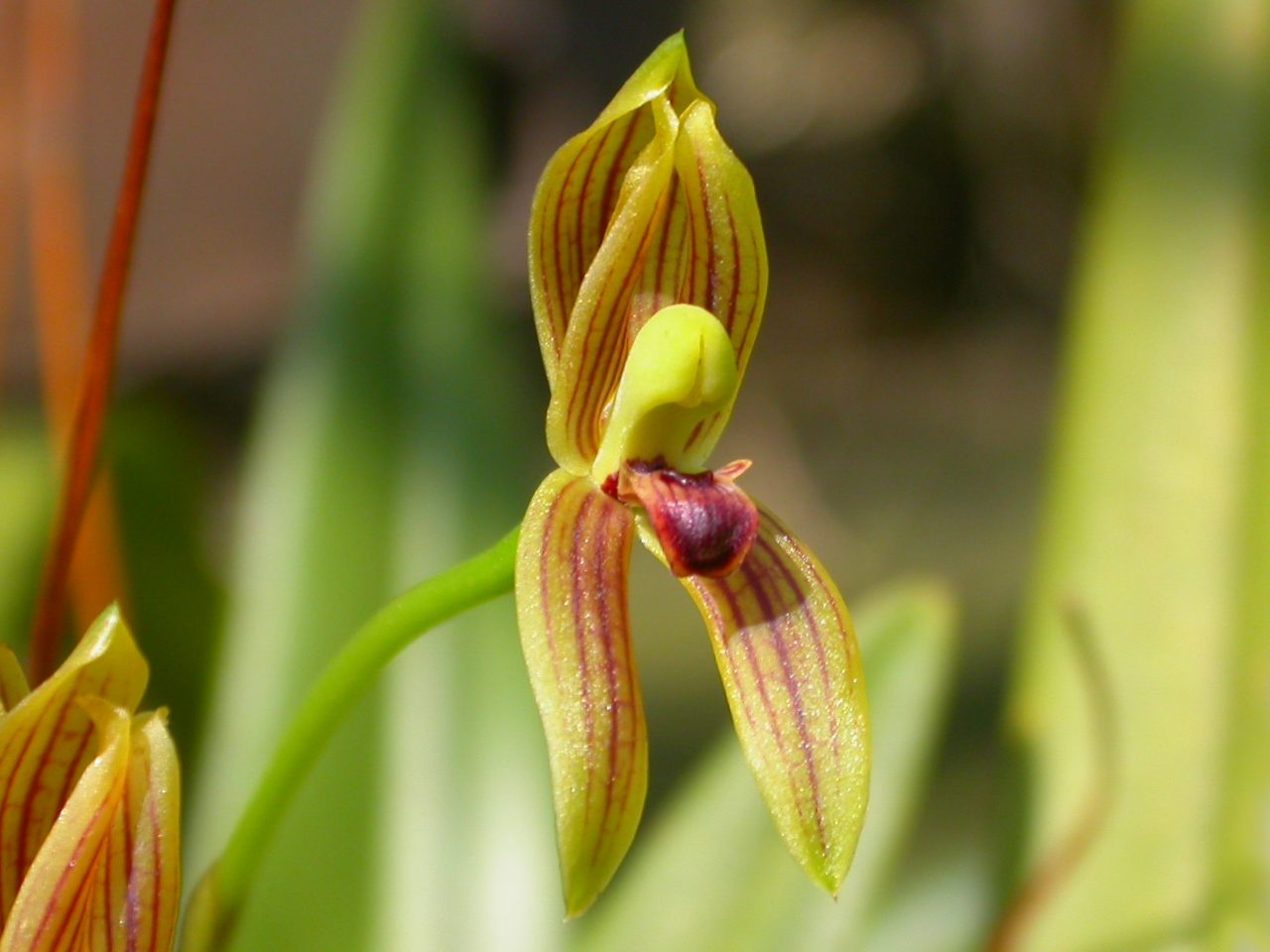

Scientific classification
- Kingdom: Plantae
- Clade: Tracheophytes
- Clade: Angiosperms
- Clade: Monocots
- Order: Asparagales
- Family: Orchidaceae
- Subfamily: Epidendroideae
- Genus: Maxillaria
- Species: M. lineolata

Binomial name
- Maxillaria lineolata (Fenzl) Molinari

Synonyms
- Mormolyca lineolata Fenzl; Maxillaria kellyana Mayta & Molinari; Mormolyca ringens (Lindl.) Gentil; Trigonidium ringens Lindl.

= Maxillaria lineolata =

Species of orchid

Maxillaria lineolata is a species of orchid native to Mexico and Central America.
