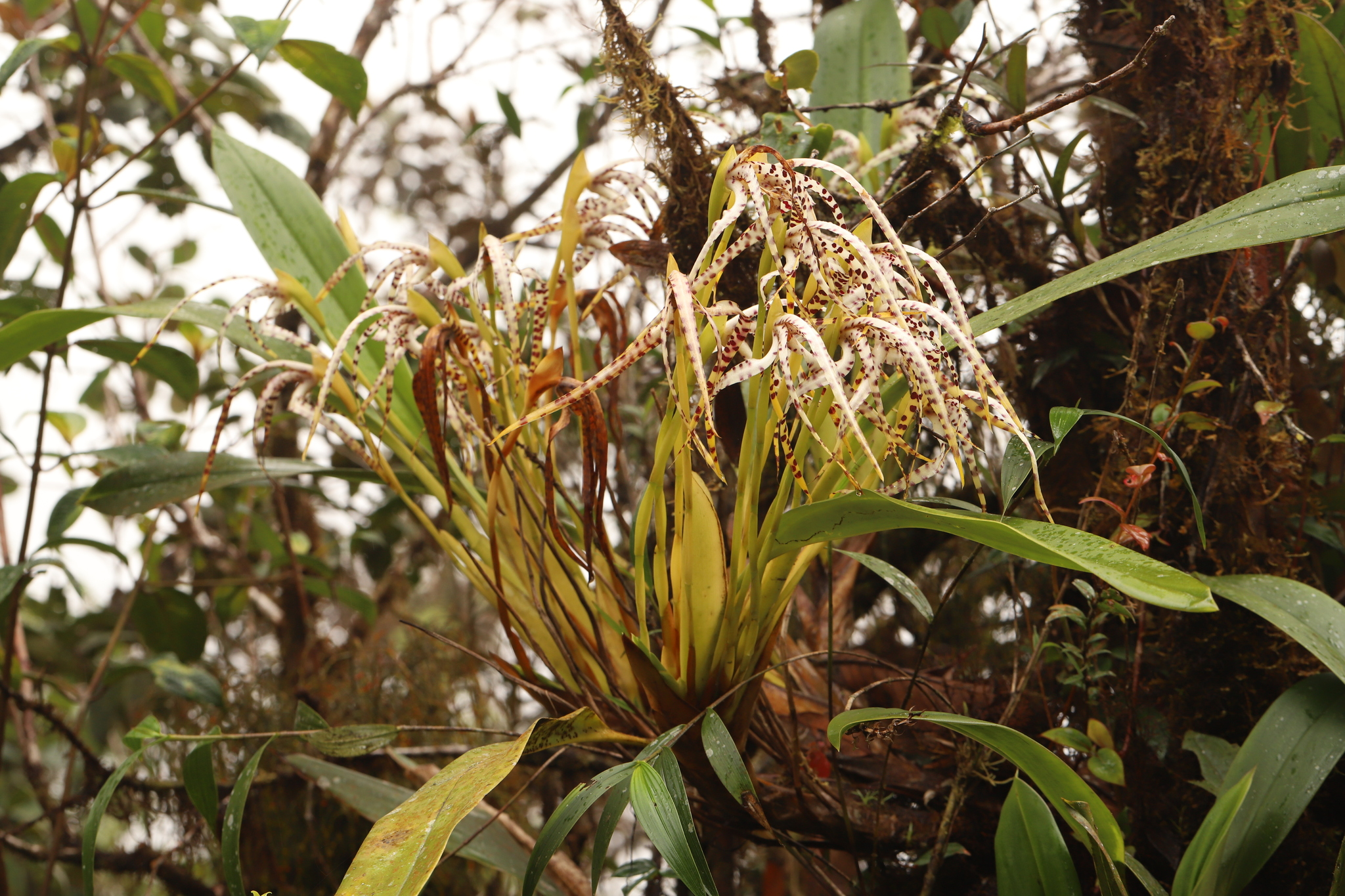

Scientific classification
- Kingdom: Plantae
- Clade: Tracheophytes
- Clade: Angiosperms
- Clade: Monocots
- Order: Asparagales
- Family: Orchidaceae
- Subfamily: Epidendroideae
- Genus: Maxillaria
- Species: M. speciosa

Binomial name
- Maxillaria speciosa Rchb.f.

Synonyms
- Maxillaria scurrilis Rolfe

= Maxillaria speciosa =

South American species of orchid

Maxillaria speciosa is a species of flowering plant in the orchid family, Orchidaceae.

== Habitat and distribution ==
Maxillaria speciosa is endemic to the Chocó–Darién moist forests of Colombia and Ecuador, a region with wet, tropical, montane rainforests noted for its orchid biodiversity. One study site in Ecuador at an elevation of 640 m experiences at least 190 wet days per year, with a mean annual precipitation of 1393 mm.

== Description ==
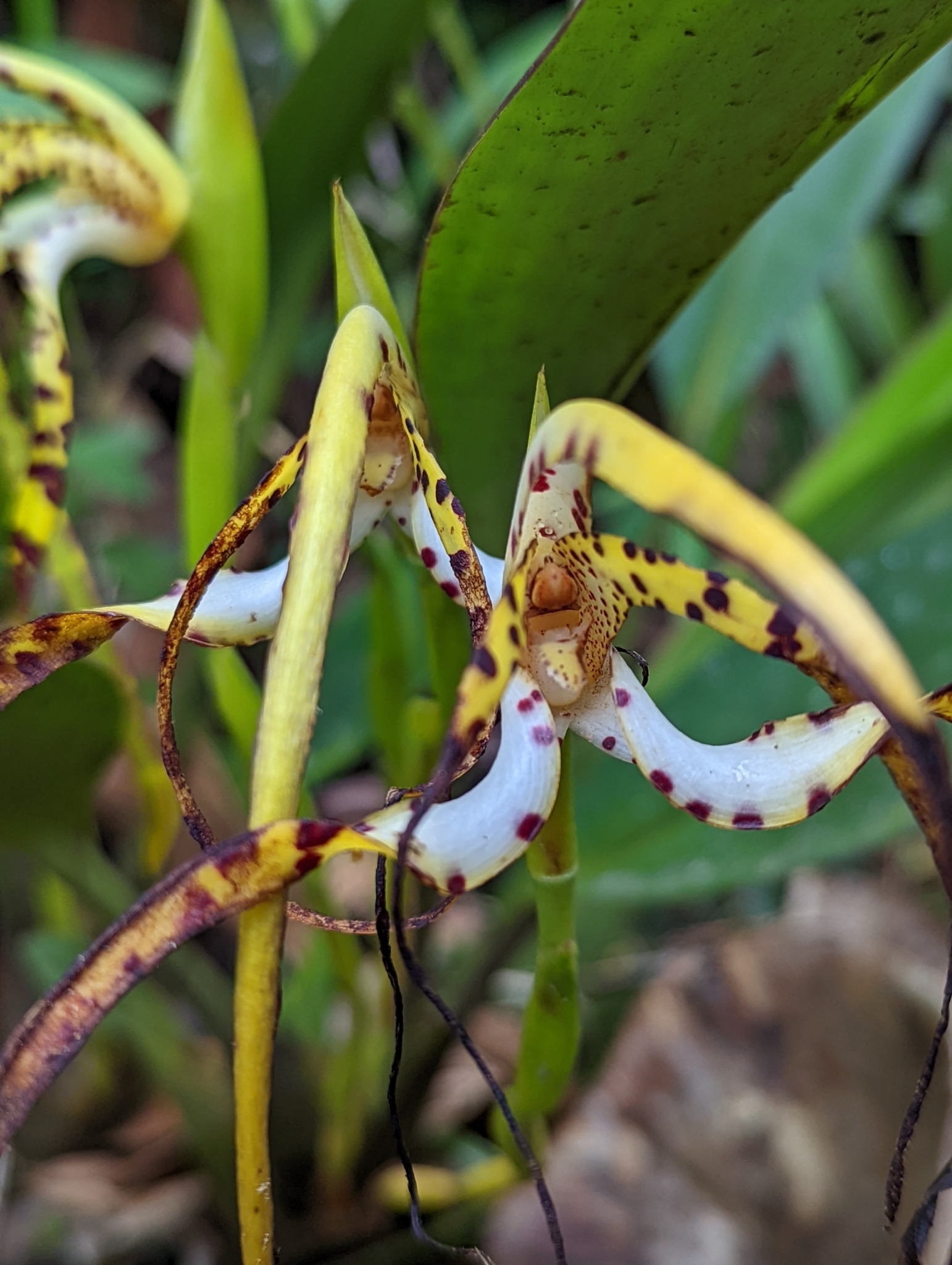
Maxillaria speciosa speciosa flowers in bloom, growing in Colombia

Maxillaria speciosa is epiphytic or lithophytic, meaning that it grows from a pseudobulb anchored on rocks or other plants. The flowers are large, fragrant, and spider-like, with narrow, spreading sepals 12–15 cm long. The labellum is 3-lobed with an obtuse, elliptical midlobe. The flowers are yellow, white, and brown: sepals and petals are white near the base and yellow near the apices, with dark purple spots, and the lip is similarly-colored, with a white to yellow midlobe.

== Taxonomy ==
The type specimen of Maxillaria speciosa was collected by brothers Eduard and František Klaboch while traveling in Colombia and sent to Heinrich Reichenbach, who formally described the species in 1876. Writing about the new species, Reichenbach mused that the plant's abundance of fragrant flowers was "enough to forgive a Maxillaria its birth as a Maxillaria," noting that M. speciosa was more appealing than most members of its genus. In 1900, Robert Allen Rolfe formally described M. scurrilis, but he remarked that the taxon might represent the same species as M. speciosa. Indeed, Leslie Garay confirmed in 1967 that M. scurrilis is a synonym of M. speciosa.

== Similar species ==
Maxillaria speciosa is morphologically similar to M. patens and M. rodrigueziana, although phylogenetic studies have shown that neither species is sister to M. speciosa.
