= Maxillaria donaldeedodii =

Scientific classification
- Kingdom: Plantae
- Clade: Tracheophytes
- Clade: Angiosperms
- Clade: Monocots
- Order: Asparagales
- Family: Orchidaceae
- Subfamily: Epidendroideae
- Genus: Maxillaria
- Species: M. donaldeedodii

Binomial name
- Maxillaria donaldeedodii (Ackerman & Whitten) Christenson

Synonyms
- Ornithidium donaldeedodii Ackerman & Whitten

Species of orchid

Maxillaria donaldeedodii, synonym Ornithidium donaldeedodii, is a species of orchid native to Haiti. It was "discovered" in April 2010 when DNA analysis showed that a wrongly labeled orchid at the University of California Botanical Garden in Berkeley, California, was actually a distinct new species. The "new" orchid, which had been mislabeled as Maxillaria croceorubens since the 1990s, was named after orchidologist Donald D. Dod (1912–2008), who collected the specimen in the 1980s in Haiti. The new orchid was officially described in Lankesteriana, an international journal on orchidology, by authors James Ackerman of the University of Puerto Rico and W. Mark Whitten of the Florida Museum of Natural History, as Ornithidium donaldeedodii. It was transferred to Maxillaria in 2011.

Maxillaria donaldeedodii is closely related to Maxillaria coccinea, based on morphology and molecular sequencing. The flowers of M. donaldeedodii flowers are campanulate, bright red to red-orange, from 35 to 37 mm (1.4 to 1.5 in) long, similar to its close relative in color and form. It is distinguished from M. coccineum by its shorter apical leaves, globose pseudobulbs, and longer sepals. M. donaldeedodii was collected in Pic Macaya National Park in the Massif de la Hotte range in south-western Haiti.

The plant was part of Dod's personal collection until he donated it to the UC Botanical Garden. Ackerman had suspected for many years that it was a unique species, but it had never flowered, and he was "unwilling to describe it as new without the flowers." Suddenly, in May 2009, the orchid burst into bloom for the first time.

Dod was a Protestant missionary in the Caribbean who discovered many new species, including several inconspicuous pleurothallid orchids, during his seventeen years there. Numerous orchids have been named for Dod over the years.
