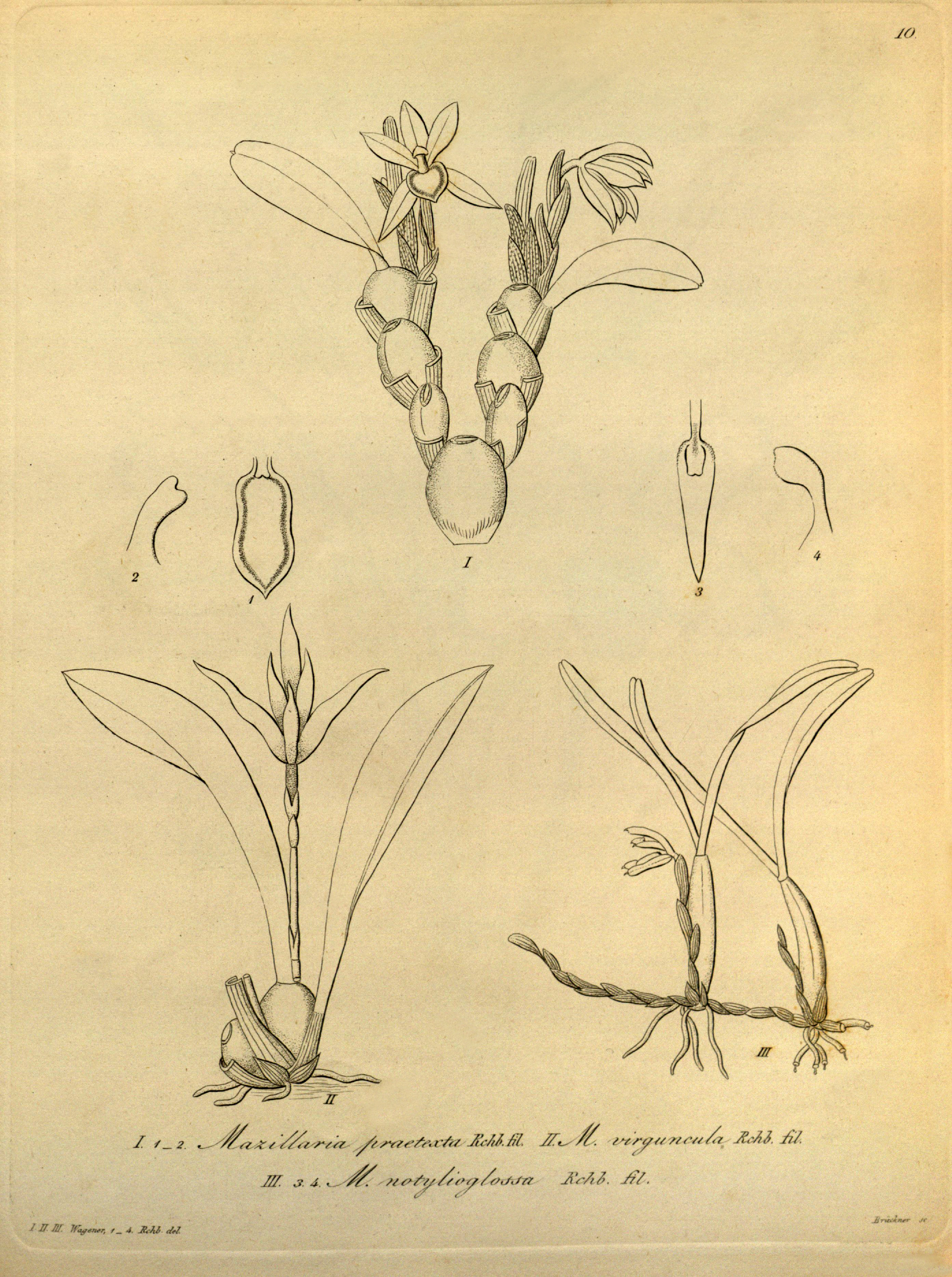
- Maxillaria notylioglossa (III)

Scientific classification
- Kingdom: Plantae
- Clade: Tracheophytes
- Clade: Angiosperms
- Clade: Monocots
- Order: Asparagales
- Family: Orchidaceae
- Subfamily: Epidendroideae
- Genus: Maxillaria
- Species: M. notylioglossa

Binomial name
- Maxillaria notylioglossa Rchb.f.

= Maxillaria notylioglossa =

Notylia-like lip maxillaria

Species of orchid

Maxillaria notylioglossa, the Notylia-like Lip Maxillaria, is a species of orchid native to tropical South America.

== Synonyms ==
- Maxillaria cerifera Barb.Rodr.
- Maxillaria flavoviridis Barb.Rodr.
- Maxillaria meirax Rchb.f. & Warm.
- Ornithidium ceriferum (Barb.Rodr.) Barb.Rodr.
- Ornithidium divaricatum Barb.Rodr.
- Ornithidium flavoviridium (Barb.Rodr.) Barb.Rodr.
- Maxillaria nervosa Rolfe ex Britton
- Maxillaria divaricata (Barb.Rodr.) Cogn.
- Maxillaria divaricata var. parvifolia Cogn.
- Maxillaria fallax Schltr.
- Rhetinantha cerifera (Barb.Rodr.) M.A.Blanco
- Rhetinantha divaricata (Barb.Rodr.) M.A.Blanco
- Rhetinantha notylioglossa (Rchb.f.) M.A.Blanco
