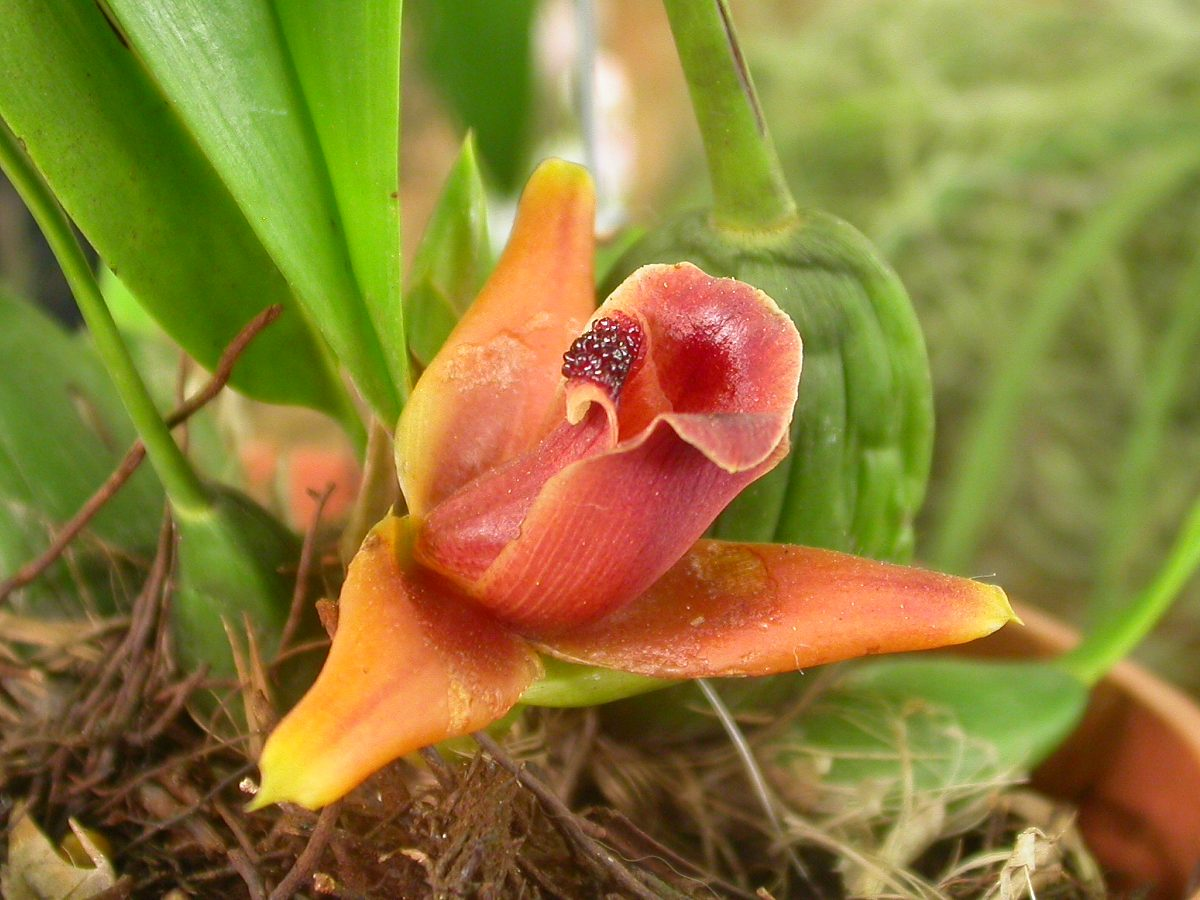

Scientific classification
- Kingdom: Plantae
- Clade: Tracheophytes
- Clade: Angiosperms
- Clade: Monocots
- Order: Asparagales
- Family: Orchidaceae
- Subfamily: Epidendroideae
- Genus: Maxillaria
- Species: M. desvauxiana

Binomial name
- Maxillaria desvauxiana Rchb.f.

Synonyms
- Mapinguari desvauxianus (Rchb.f.) Carnevali & R.B.Singer; Mapinguari verrucifer (C.Schweinf.) Szlach. & Sitko; Maxillaria coriacea Barb.Rodr.; Maxillaria huebneri Schltr.; Maxillaria petiolaris A.Rich.; Maxillaria verrucifera C.Schweinf.

= Maxillaria desvauxiana =

Species of orchid

Maxillaria desvauxiana is a species of orchid native to tropical South America. It is known from Bolivia, Brazil, Colombia, Ecuador, French Guiana, Guyana, Peru, Suriname and Venezuela.
