= Maxillaria carolii =

Scientific classification
- Kingdom: Plantae
- Clade: Tracheophytes
- Clade: Angiosperms
- Clade: Monocots
- Order: Asparagales
- Family: Orchidaceae
- Subfamily: Epidendroideae
- Genus: Maxillaria
- Species: M. carolii

Binomial name
- Maxillaria carolii Christenson

Species of plant

Maxillaria carolii is a species of epiphytic orchid native to Colombia.

== Characteristics ==
This species has egg shaped ridged pseudobulbs topped with a single leaf that is about 16 in (406.4mm) long. The 3.4 in flowers are white with long petals and sepals. The labellum is yellow with purple stripes.
