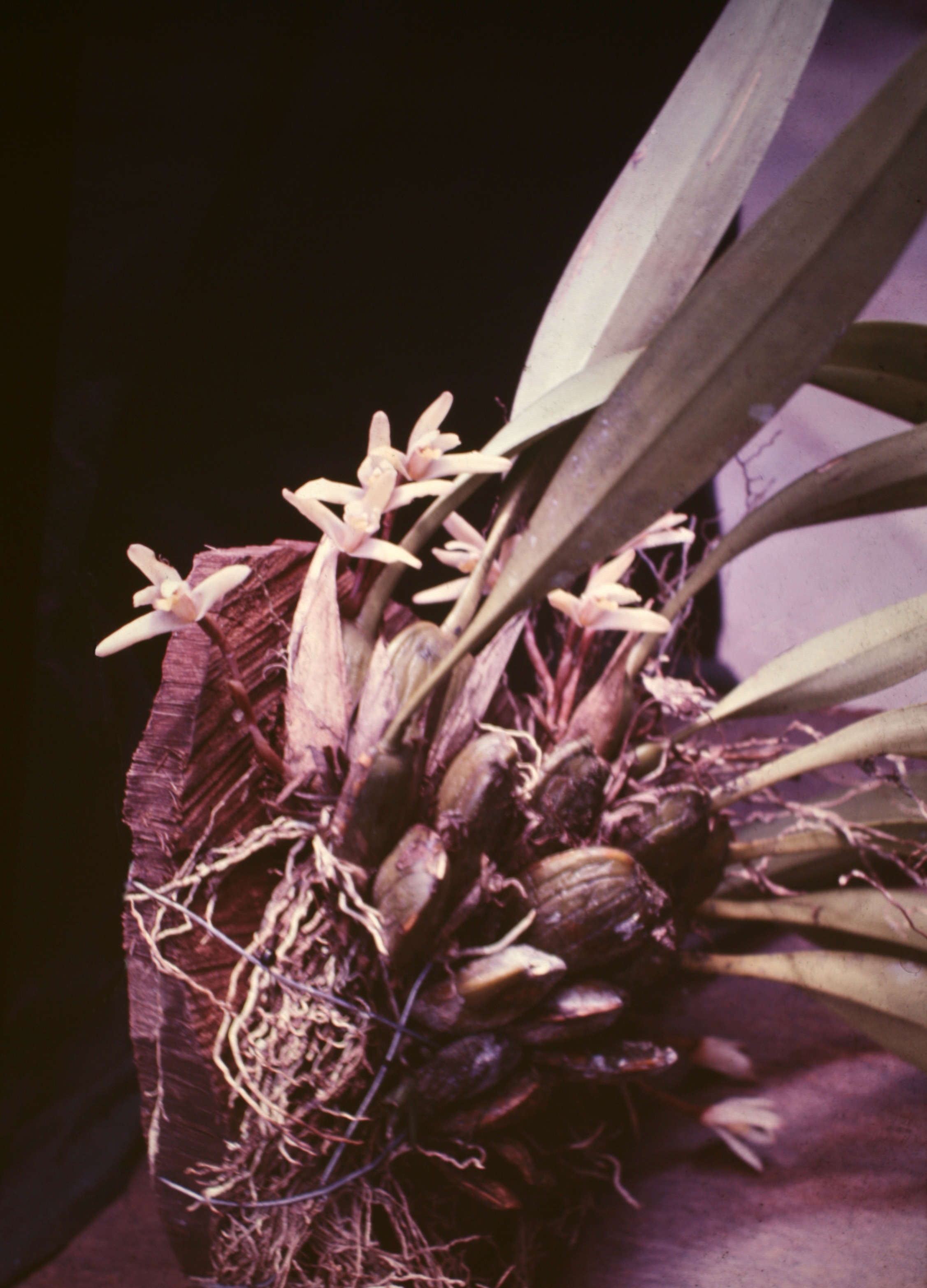

Scientific classification
- Kingdom: Plantae
- Clade: Tracheophytes
- Clade: Angiosperms
- Clade: Monocots
- Order: Asparagales
- Family: Orchidaceae
- Subfamily: Epidendroideae
- Genus: Maxillaria
- Species: M. parkeri

Binomial name
- Maxillaria parkeri Hook.

Synonyms
- Colax parkeri (Hook.) A.Spreng.; Menadena parkeri (Hook.) Raf.; Maxillaria lorifolia Rchb.f.

= Maxillaria parkeri =

Species of orchid

Maxillaria parkeri is a species of orchid native to tropical South America.
