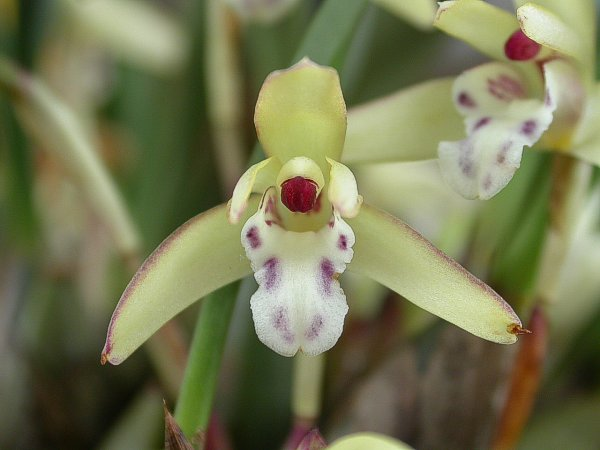

Scientific classification
- Kingdom: Plantae
- Clade: Tracheophytes
- Clade: Angiosperms
- Clade: Monocots
- Order: Asparagales
- Family: Orchidaceae
- Subfamily: Epidendroideae
- Genus: Maxillaria
- Species: M. humilis

Binomial name
- Maxillaria humilis (Link & Otto) Schuit. & M.W.Chase

Synonyms
- Bletia humilis Link & Otto; Bolbidium gracile (Lodd., G.Lodd. & W.Lodd.) J.M.H.Shaw; Brasiliorchis gracilis (G.Lodd. ex Paxton & J.Harrison) R.B.Singer, S.Koehler & Carnevali; Maxillaria gracilis Lodd., G.Lodd. & W.Lodd.; Maxillaria gracilis var. angustifolia Hoehne; Maxillaria gracilis var. intermedia Hoehne; Maxillaria gracilis var. macrantha Hoehne; Maxillaria gracilis var. minor Hoehne; Maxillaria gracilis var. punctata (G.Lodd.) Cogn.; Maxillaria gracilis var. queirogana (Barb.Rodr.) Hoehne; Maxillaria guayanensis Klinge; Maxillaria punctata Lodd.; Maxillaria penduliflora Fenzl; Maxillaria queirogana Barb.Rodr.

= Maxillaria humilis =

Species of orchid

Maxillaria humilis is a species of orchid (family Orchidaceae) native to eastern and southern Brazil.
