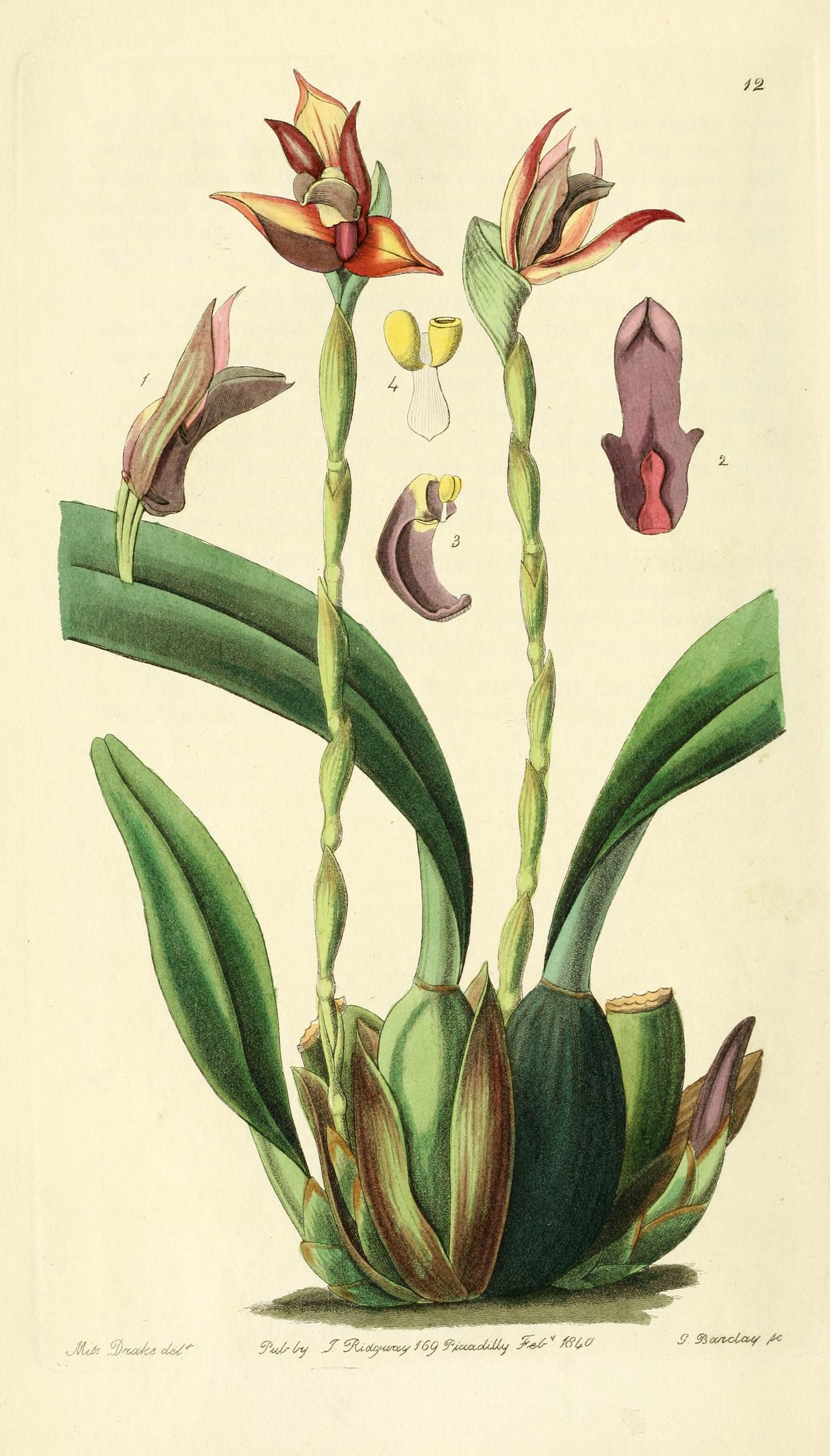
- 1840 illustration

Scientific classification
- Kingdom: Plantae
- Clade: Tracheophytes
- Clade: Angiosperms
- Clade: Monocots
- Order: Asparagales
- Family: Orchidaceae
- Subfamily: Epidendroideae
- Genus: Maxillaria
- Species: M. cucullata

Binomial name
- Maxillaria cucullata Lindl.

Synonyms
- Camaridium cucullatum (Lindl.) M.A.Blanco; Maxillaria hematoglossa A.Rich. & Galeotti; Maxillaria atrata Rchb.f.; Maxillaria punctostriata Rchb.f.; Maxillaria rubrilabia Schltr.

= Maxillaria cucullata =

Species of orchid

Maxillaria cucullata, the cowl-carrying maxillaria, is a species of orchid ranging from Mexico, Belize southward into Panama.
