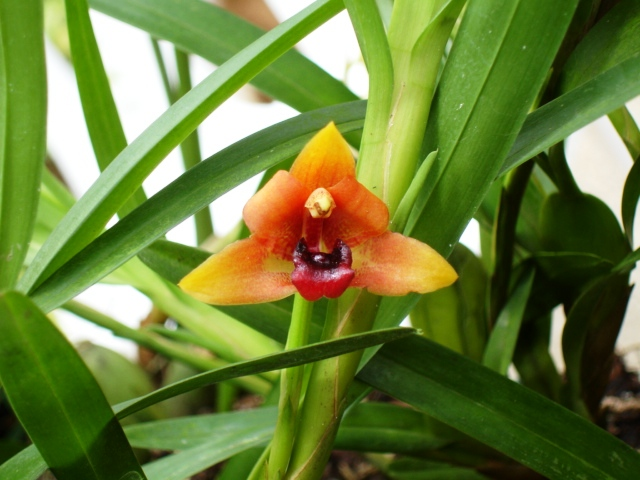

Scientific classification
- Kingdom: Plantae
- Clade: Tracheophytes
- Clade: Angiosperms
- Clade: Monocots
- Order: Asparagales
- Family: Orchidaceae
- Subfamily: Epidendroideae
- Genus: Maxillaria
- Species: M. variabilis

Binomial name
- Maxillaria variabilis Bateman ex Lindl.

Synonyms
- Maxillaria henchmannii Hook.; Maxillaria variabilis var. unipunctata Lindl.; Maxillaria angustifolia Hook.; Maxillaria curtipes Hook.; Maxillaria lyonii Lindl.; Maxillaria revoluta Klotzsch; Maxillaria chiriquiensis Schltr.; Maxillaria panamensis Schltr.

= Maxillaria variabilis =

Species of orchid

Maxillaria variabilis, the variable maxillaria, is a species of orchid ranging from Mexico to Panama, and probably Guyana.
