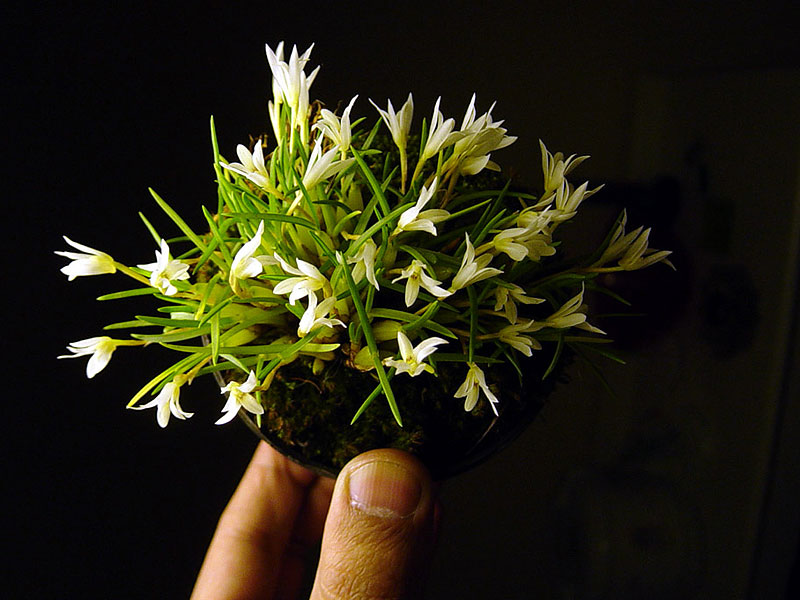

Scientific classification
- Kingdom: Plantae
- Clade: Tracheophytes
- Clade: Angiosperms
- Clade: Monocots
- Order: Asparagales
- Family: Orchidaceae
- Subfamily: Epidendroideae
- Genus: Maxillaria
- Species: M. echinophyta

Binomial name
- Maxillaria echinophyta (Barb.Rodr.) Szlach., Mytnik, Górniak & Smiszek

Synonyms
- Christensonella echinophyta Barb.Rodr.

= Maxillaria echinophyta =

Species of orchid

Maxillaria echinophyta is a species of orchid endemic to Brazil.
