= Maxillaria petiolaris =

Scientific classification
- Kingdom: Plantae
- Clade: Tracheophytes
- Clade: Angiosperms
- Clade: Monocots
- Order: Asparagales
- Family: Orchidaceae
- Subfamily: Epidendroideae
- Genus: Maxillaria
- Species: M. petiolaris

Binomial name
- Maxillaria petiolaris Schltr.

Synonyms
- Bifrenaria minuta Garay; Bifrenaria petiolaris (Schltr.) G.A.Romero & Carnevali; Bifrenaria rudolfii Carnevali & G.A.Romero, nom. illeg.; Hylaeorchis petiolaris (Schltr.) Carnevali & G.A.Romero; Maxillaria perparva Garay & Dunst.; Maxillaria rudolfii Hoehne, nom. illeg.

Species of orchids

Maxillaria petiolaris, synonym Hylaeorchis petiolaris, is a species of epiphytic orchids native to northwestern South America (Colombia, Venezuela, Ecuador, Peru, northern Brazil). When placed in the genus Hylaeorchis, it was the only species.
