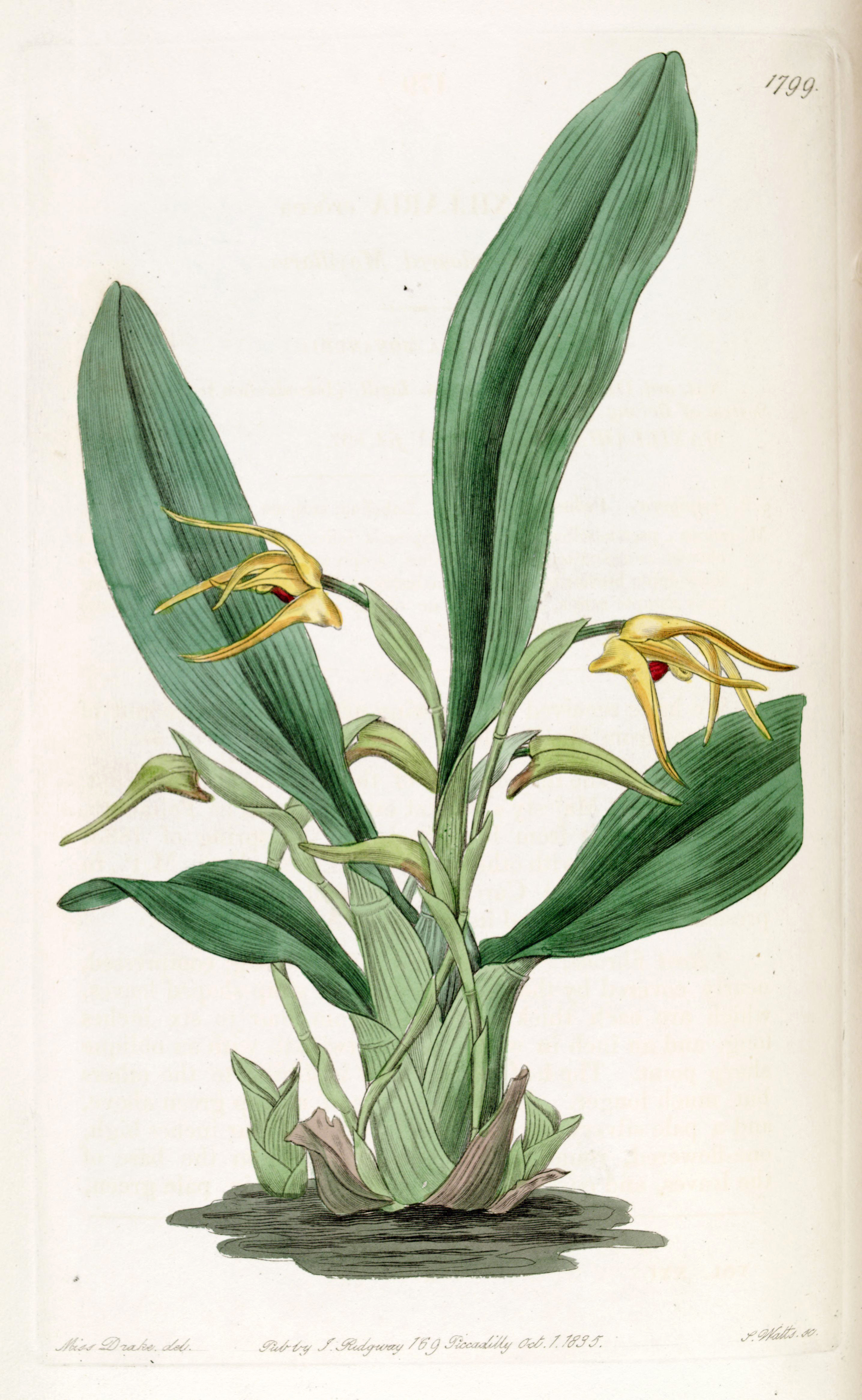

Scientific classification
- Kingdom: Plantae
- Clade: Embryophytes
- Clade: Tracheophytes
- Clade: Angiosperms
- Clade: Monocots
- Order: Asparagales
- Family: Orchidaceae
- Subfamily: Epidendroideae
- Genus: Maxillaria
- Species: M. lindleyana

Binomial name
- Maxillaria lindleyana Schltr.

Synonyms
- Maxillaria crocea Lindl. (basionym); Maxillaria crocea var. lietzei Regel; Maxillaria lindleyana var. lietzei (Regel) Hoehne

= Maxillaria lindleyana =

Species of orchid

Maxillaria lindleyana, or Lindley's maxillaria, is a species of orchid occurring from Brazil to Peru.
