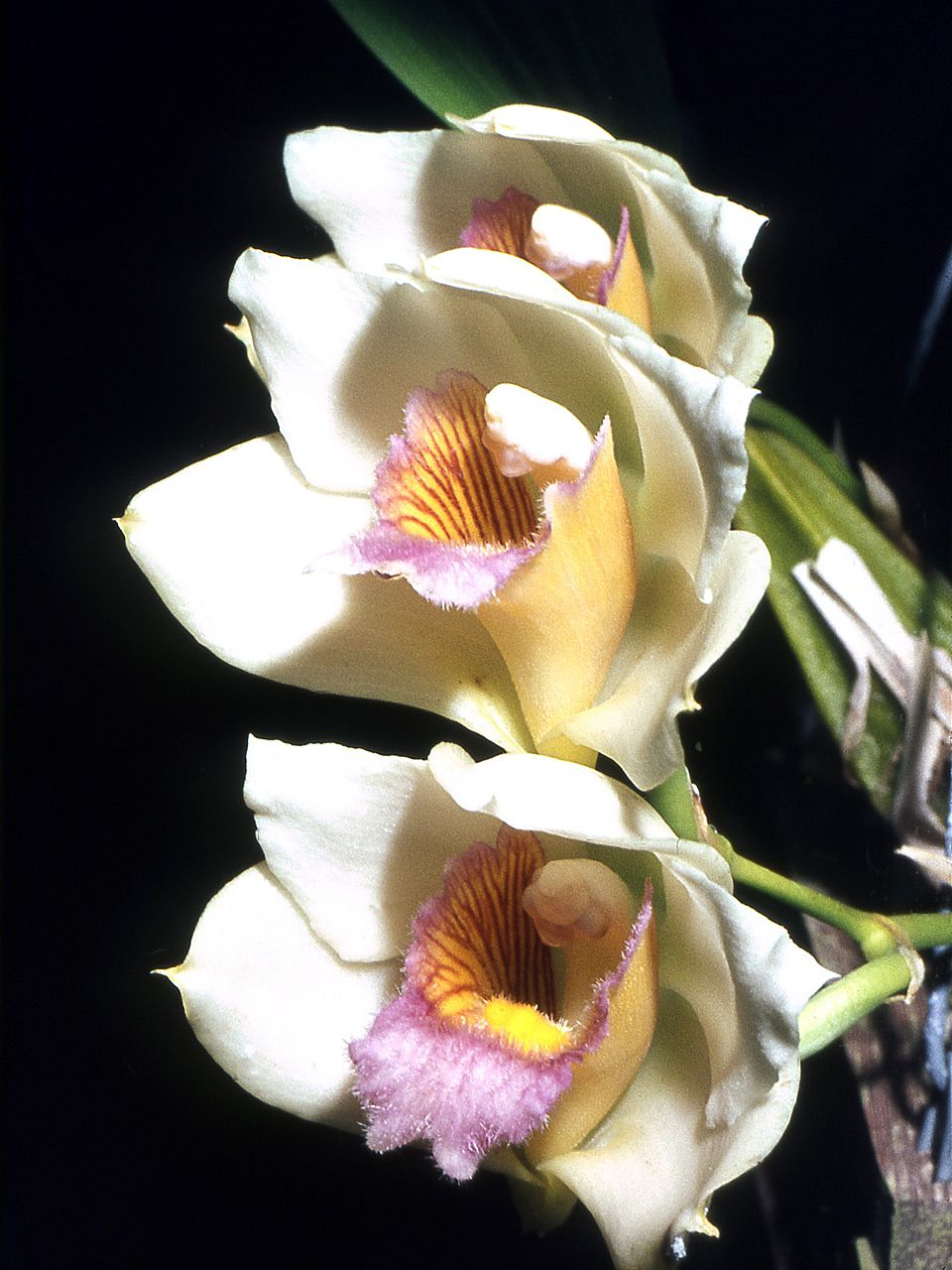
- Bifrenaria tyrianthina

Scientific classification
- Kingdom: Plantae
- Clade: Tracheophytes
- Clade: Angiosperms
- Clade: Monocots
- Order: Asparagales
- Family: Orchidaceae
- Subfamily: Epidendroideae
- Tribe: Cymbidieae
- Subtribe: Maxillariinae
- Genus: Bifrenaria; Lindl..

Type species
- Bifrenaria atropurpurea Lindl.

Species
- see text
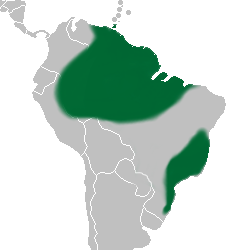
- Distribution of Bifrenaria

Synonyms
- Colax Lindl. ex Spreng.; Adipe Raf.; Stenocoryne Lindl.; Cydoniorchis Senghas

= Bifrenaria =

Genus of orchids

Bifrenaria, abbreviated Bif. in horticultural trade, is a genus of plants in family Orchidaceae. It contains 20 species found in Panama, Trinidad and South America. There are no known uses for them, but their abundant, and at first glance artificial, flowers, make them favorites of orchid growers.

The genus can be split in two clearly distinct groups: one of highly robust plants with large flowers, that encompass the first species to be classified under the genus Bifrenaria; other of more delicate plants with smaller flowers occasionally classified as Stenocoryne or Adipe. There are two additional species that are normally classified as Bifrenaria, but which molecular analysis indicate to belong to different orchid groups entirely. One is Bifrenaria grandis which is endemic to Bolívia and which is now placed in Lacaena, and Bifrenaria steyermarkii, an inhabitant of the northern Amazon Forest, which does not have an alternative classification.

== Description ==
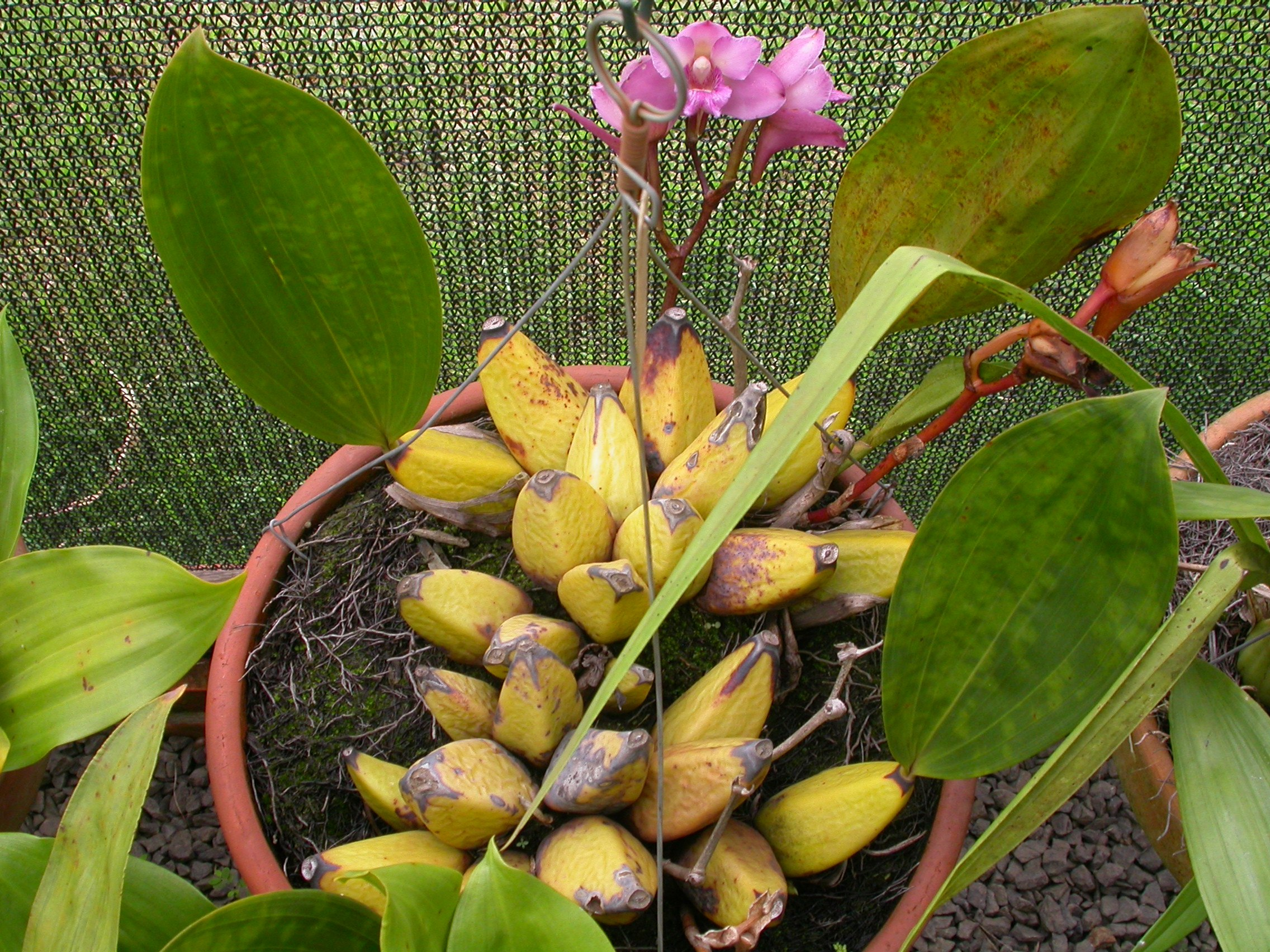
Bifrenaria tyrianthina showing the prominent banana-like pseudobulbs of larger species.

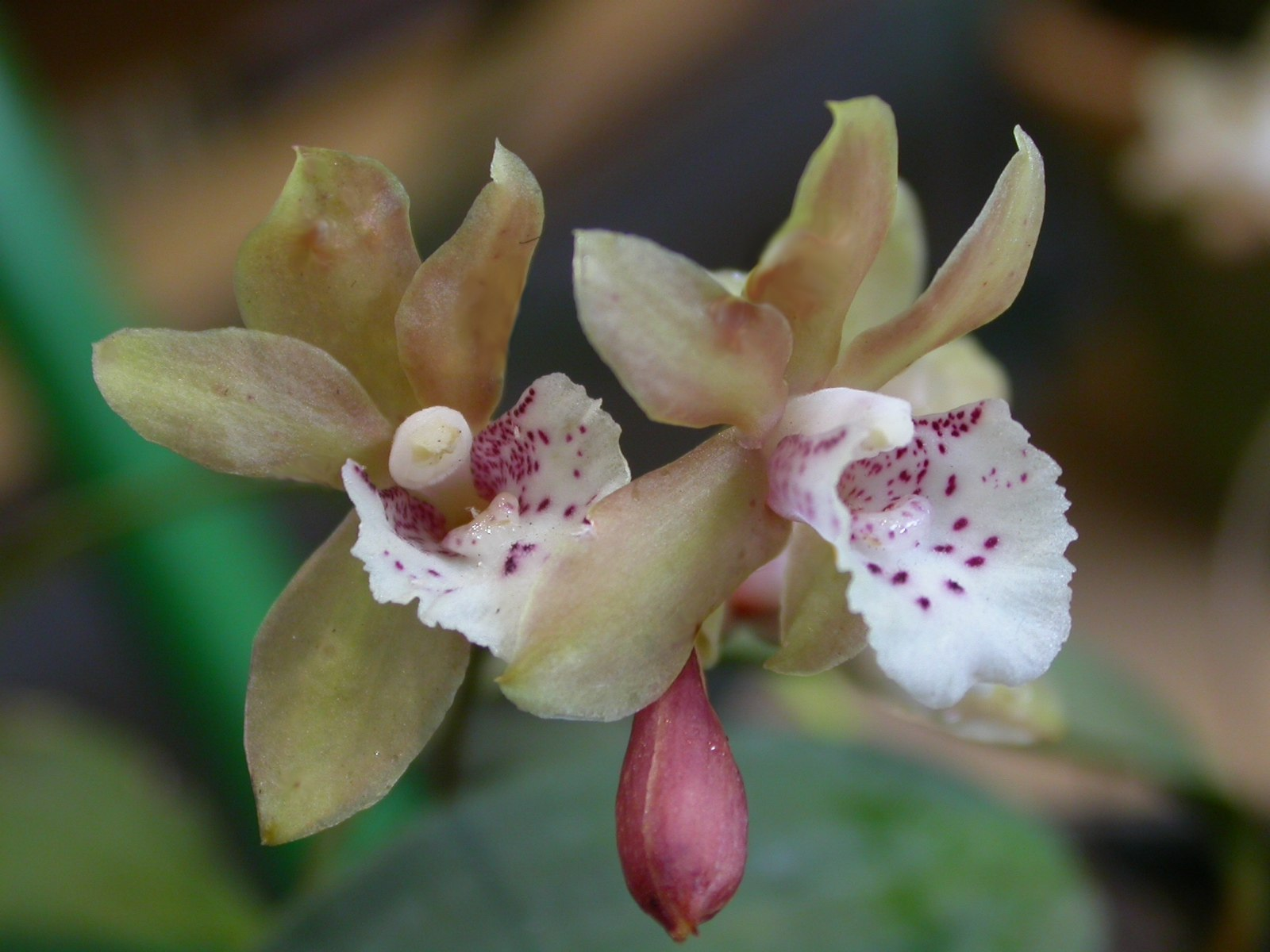
By contrast, the pseudobulbs of smaller species, such as this Bifrenaria racemosa, a much less noticeable.

Bifrenaria are generally robust plants, of sympodial growth, between ten and sixty centimeters tall. They are characterized by round-section root with thick velamen, four-angled fleshy pseudobulbs of one internode, often basally protected by dried sheaths and with only one apical leaf (except for Bifrenaria steyermarkii, which occasionally has two), plicate (fan-folded) enervated leathery leaves, yet malleable and not exceedingly thick, with a pseudo-petiole of basal round section, and a basal inflorescences bearing up to ten flowers, which seldom surpass the leaves' length.

Bifrenaria flowers are strongly scented, they have sepals slightly larger than the petals, with the lateral ones basally united to the column foot forming a calcar with truncated extremity. The column is slightly arching, generally without wings or any other appendages, bearing a foot which the labellum is hinged to, whose shape varies, articulated to the column, with a longitudinal channeled callus often with a basal claw. Flowers show two elongated stipes, hardy ever one, at least twice longer than wide, with salient viscidium, visible caudicles and retinacle in inverted positions. The superposed pollinia number four, and are protected by a deciduous incumbent anther. Fruits are green, erect or pendulous; they take about eight months to ripe and hold hundreds of thousand yellowish or brownish elongated seeds up to 0.35 mm long. Among all the mentioned, the main characteristic distinguishing Bifrenaria from its closest relatives is the presence of the calcar. Other important characters are the four-sided single-leaved pseudobulbs besides the raceme inflorescence with two to ten flowers.

Little is known about pollination in Bifrenaria. Apparently the only existing records report the presence of some large species' pollinia observed on the back of male Eufriesea violacea bees (Euglossinae), and of Bombus brasiliensis (Bombini). Although there are no reports of flower pollination being directly observed, a paper published in 2006 studied the micromorphology of the labellum in Bifrenaria species, looking for substances useful to insects as food. The absence of such substances on the densely pubescent surface of most Bifrenaria labelli seems to indicate possible pollination by large bees as the major mean. Another indicator of this possibility is the strong smell emanated by species like B. tetragona which are similar to those of plants in other families which are also pollinated by these bees. The smaller pubescent species may be pollinated by smaller bees, while the smooth ones, which have strong colored flowers, as B. aureofulva, might be pollinated by hummingbirds.

== Taxonomy and phylogeny ==
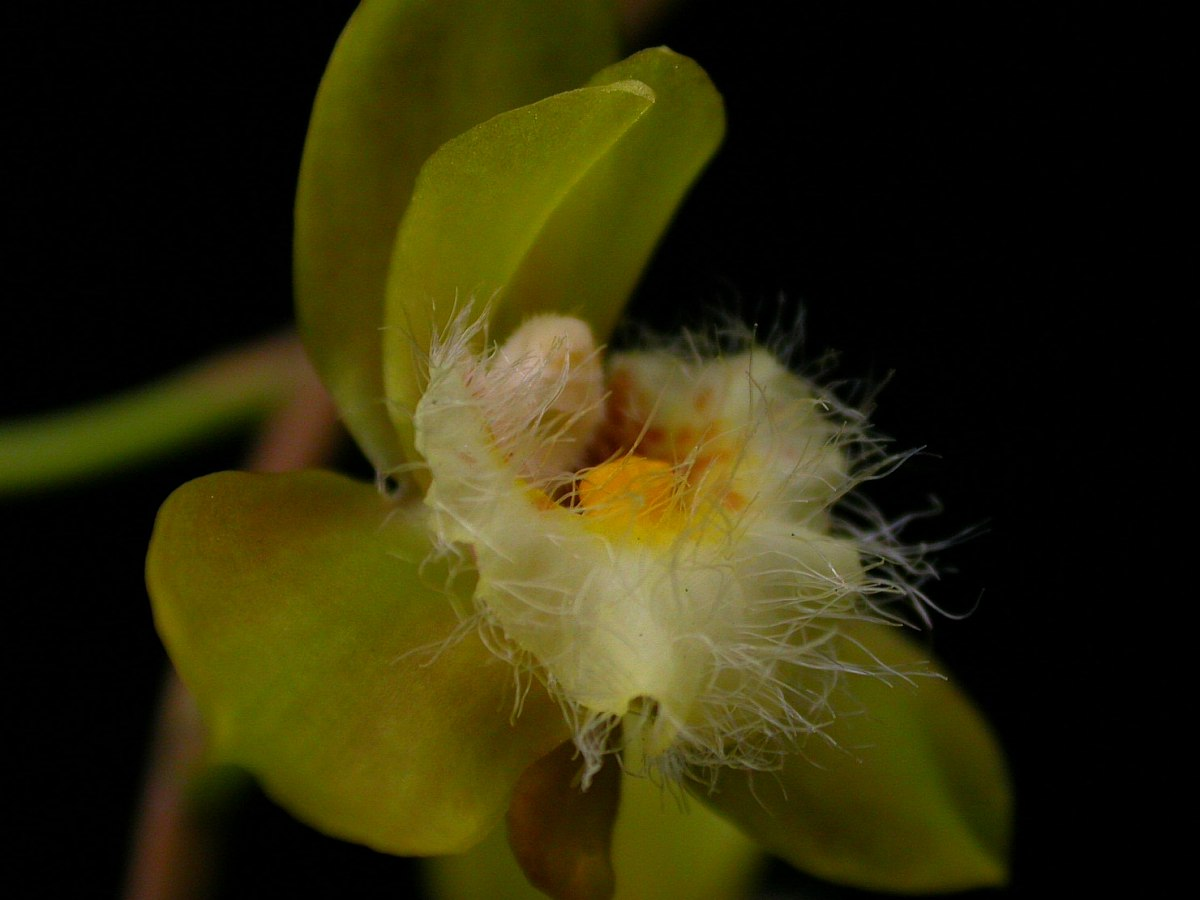
Bifrenaria charlesworthii is a small, pubescent species very similar to B. racemosa.

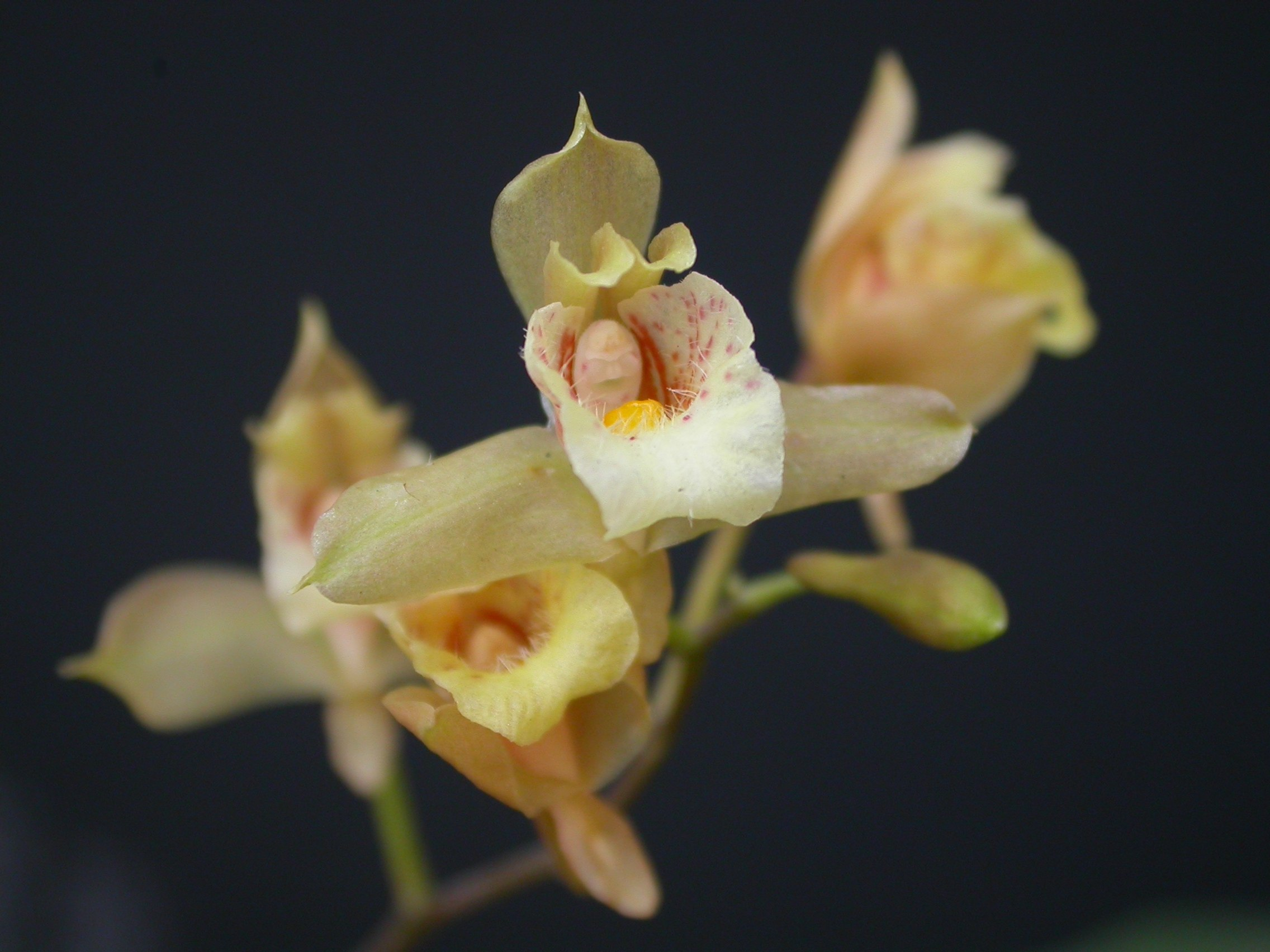
Although B. racemosa can sometimes be separated from B charlesworthii, the large numbers of intermediate forms make some taxonomists think that they might be better treated as a single species.

The first Bifrenaria species to be described was in 1824 by English Botanist William Jackson Hooker, under the name Dendrobium harrisoniae. Three years later, he also described the first small-flowered species, B. racemosa, but placed it in Maxillaria. With these two publications began a long series of species descriptions and confusing genera creation which generated much doubt for the next two centuries. The Royal Botanic Gardens, Kew registers the submission of 69 species or subspecific taxa under Bifrenaria since the description of the first species. Among these, twenty are generally accepted but only seventeen are truly well established, with no doubts about their limits and classification. Thirteen other species are still accepted but now placed in other genera, and four or five, due to deficiencies in their descriptions, might never be definitely identified.

In 1832, John Lindley proposed the genus Bifrenaria and described its type species, Bifrenaria atropurpurea, previously named by Conrad Loddiges as Maxillaria atropurpurea. The name Bifrenaria comes from bi, two, and freno, brake, a reference to the shape of the two pairs of pollinia hold by separated caudicles presented by its flowers.

In 1837, Constantine Samuel Rafinesque, considering the noticeable vegetative difference between the few Bifrenaria known at the time, proposed the genus Adipe, based on B. racemosa morphology, described by Hooker few years before, to which he added the description of a supposed new species, Adipe fulva (today treated as a synonym of B. racemosa). The next year Lindley received a specimen from Amazonia, which was morphologically even more distant from the known species, but nonetheless described it as Bifrenaria longicornis'. Five years later, apparently not aware of Rafinesque's previous genus Adipe, Lindley changed his mind and suggested that this species should be classified under a new genus, Stenocoryne. Six species were subsequently attributed to Stenocoryne by various taxonomists, but the genus Rafinesque proposed remained unused until 1990.

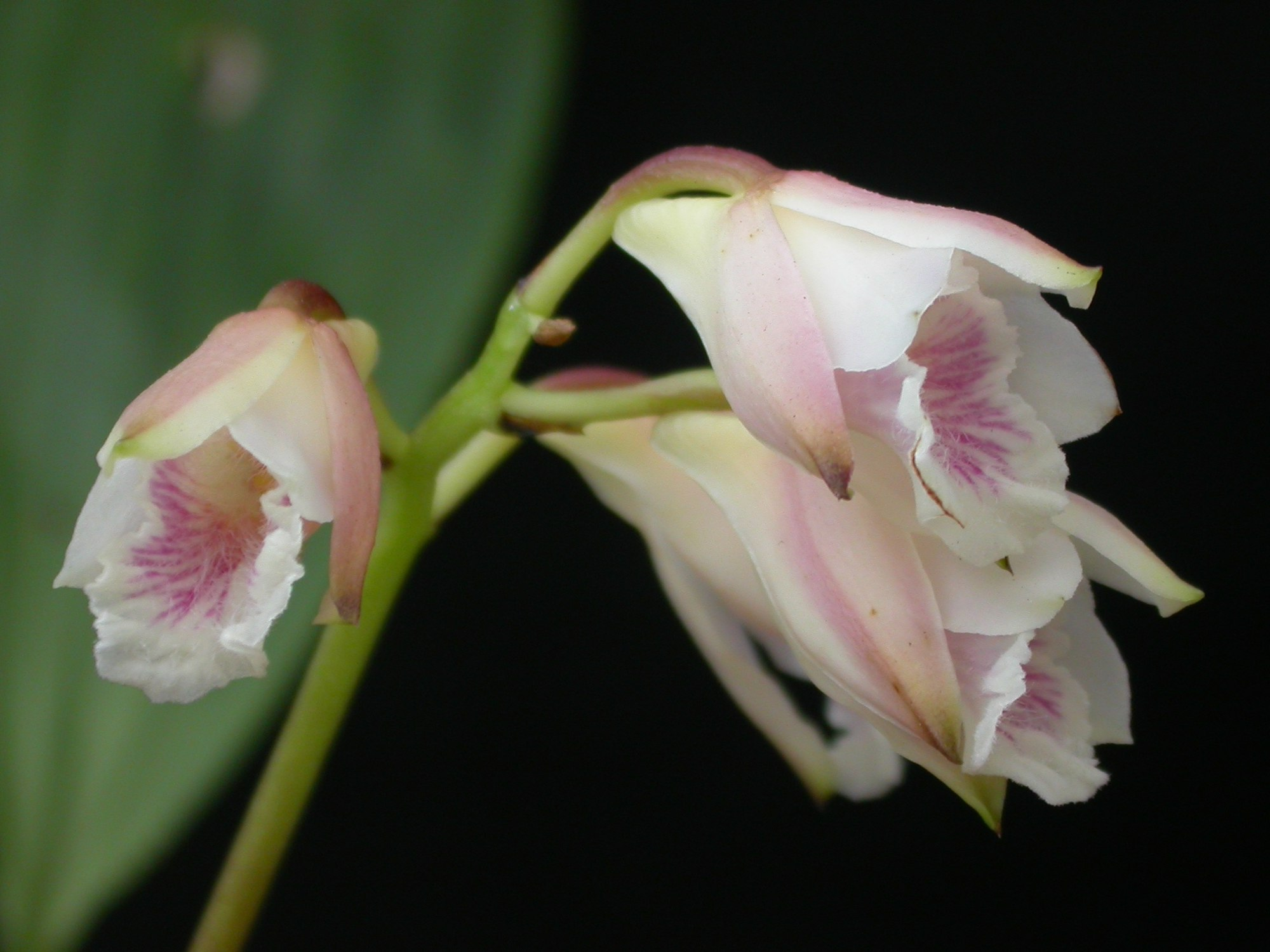
Bifrenaria leucorhoda is one of the easier to identify small species because of its delicate pale pink flowers and darker purple veins on the labellum.

Two species similar to Bifrenaria, but that showed a highly salient claw at the base of the labellum and lateral lobes abruptly divided were then classified under this genus. In 1914, Rudolf Schlechter suggested they should be classified under the genus Lindleyella, with Lindley's Bifrenaria aurantiaca (which presented the mentioned differences) as the type. However this genus name was already occupied (It is a synonym of Lindleya, in the Rosaceae). Just thirty years later, in 1944, Frederico Carlos Hoehne, working on the first revision of genus Bifrenaria, corrected the suggestion of Schlechter. Hoehne initially proposed the genus Schlechterella for these species but, coincidentally, this name was also taken, this time by African Asclepiadaceae. Finally a genus with an available name in homage to Schlechter was erected in the very next issue of the journal, Rudolfiella, by which time the number of species had increased to seven. On this revision, besides Rudolfiella, Hoehne divided Bifrenaria into two genera, accepting Lindley's Stenocoryne but calling attention to the existence of Rafinesque's Adipe, which should have nomenclatural priority, while also raising doubts about the identity of several described species. In 1990, Manfred Wolff formally resurrected the genus Adipe and transferred to it ten Bifrenaria species, besides the two already described by Rafinesque; his change was purely nomenclatural and he did not revisit the species.

Making the picture even more complex, in 1994, Karheinz Senghas, based on several characteristics shared only by B. tetragona and B. wittigii, described the genus Cydoniorchis to accommodate them. In 1996, Gustavo Romero and Germán Carnevali transferred to Bifrenaria a species originally described by Schlechter as Maxillaria petiolaris and now classified as Hylaeorchis petiolaris. On the same year, Vitorino Castro Neto published a revision of Bifrenaria, with five sections, which is the classification generally used today.

Bifrenaria has traditionally been classified in subtribe Bifrenariinae of tribe Maxillarieae (Epidendroideae), however, the relationships among the several genera within this tribe are not well defined and changes are expected in the upcoming years. The genus closest to Bifrenaria is Rudolfiella. Other related genera are Teuscheria, Guanchezia, Hylaeorchis and Horvatia, in addition to the more distant Scuticaria and Xylobium. The unification of subtribes Lycastinae, Maxillariinae and Bifrenariinae has recently been suggested. However, there is no consensus on the path to be followed. Contrary to what was previously thought, the relationship among Bifrenaria and all these genera from Central America seems to indicate a primitive origin of Bifrenaria in Central America and its posterior dissemination towards the Southeast of Brazil, where it found fertile grounds to its more recent evolution.

In 2000, the first relatively complete molecular analysis on Bifrenaria species were made. Sixteen species from it and six of close genera were studied searching for confirmation of their phylogenetic relations, besides the delimitation of each species and each of Bifrenaria's groups. The results did not allow for the acceptance of Adipe as a separate genus and, although they confirmed the monophyly of Cydoniorchis (B. tetragona and B. wittigii), they dissuade its recognition because six other genera would then be required to accommodate the remaining species. The study also expounded on convenience of splitting two species that are similar to each other and variable among themselves, but with many hard intermediate forms hard to delineate as B. charlesworthii and B. racemosa. It also confirmed the position of B. steyermarkii outside of Bifrenaria, but without suggesting a new name.

Since a reevaluation by Meneguzzo and Chase in 2024, the genus Bifrenaria has been expanded to include the genres Guanchezia, Horvatia, Hylaeorchis, Rudolfiella, Scuticaria, and Teuscheria. This proposed change has been accepted as reflected by the current genus profile in Plants of the World Online.

=== Species ===
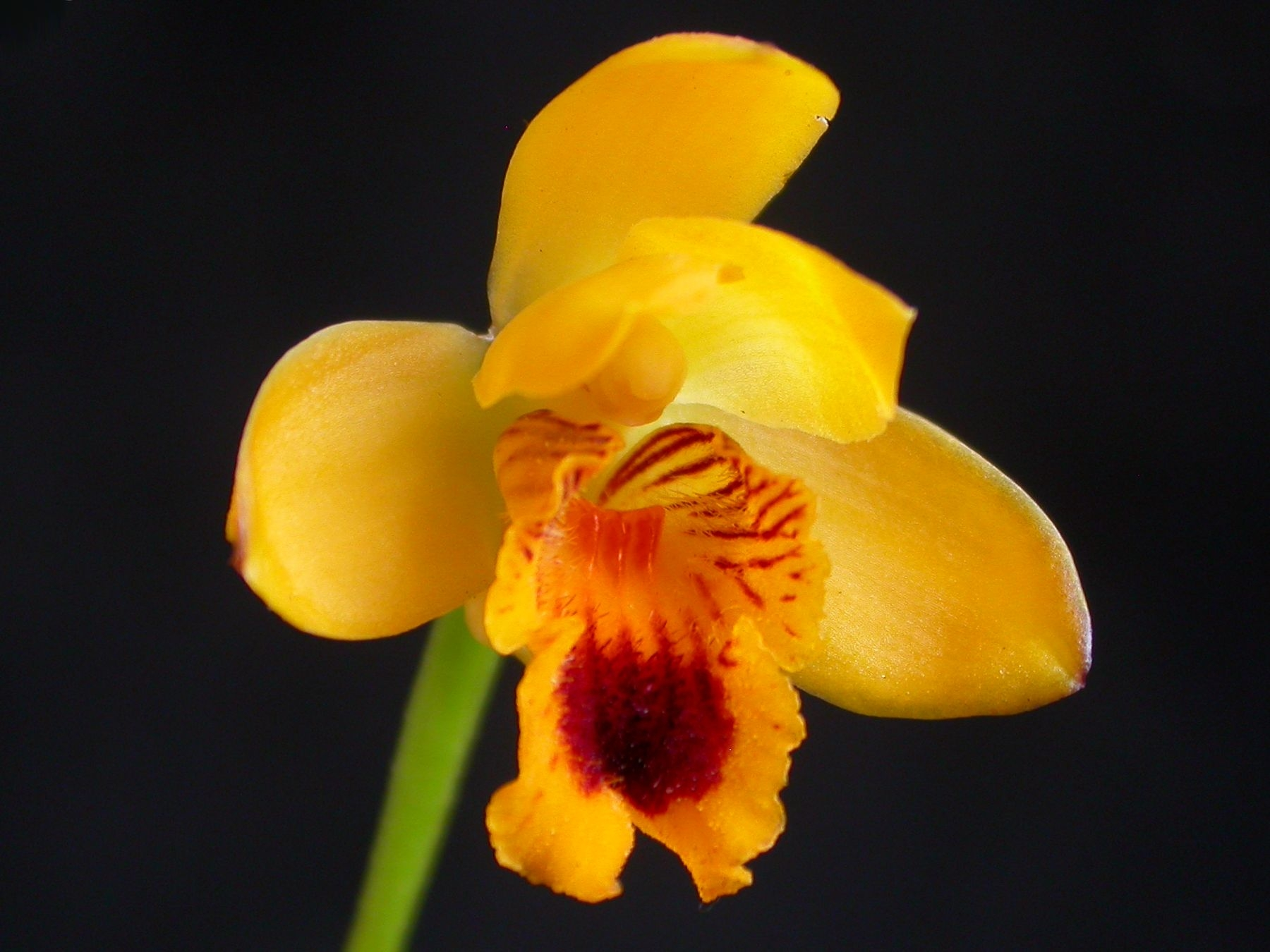
Bifrenaria vitellina This small species is similar to B. stefanae, but its flowers are more open and the colors more vivid.

Bifrenaria is formed by about twenty species divided in two main groups of plants, large and small, with some visible morphological subdivisions highly confirmed by phylogeny.

Large species: is the group originally classified as Bifrenaria. They present four sided pseudobulbs, with relatively short and erect inflorescence bearing up to ten fleshy large flowers but generally less. Usually the flowers are grouped and are fragrant or exhale strong scent. The labellum has three or four lobes and an elongated low callus. They are epiphytes, or often lithophytes. All originated in the southeast of Brazil. This group can be split in three subgroups:

- The first subgroup is formed by plants that show a pollinarium with entire stipe and a salient callus just on its anterior region. These species are similar and preferably epiphytes.The species are two:

Image	Scientific name	Description	Distribution	Elevation (m)
	B. calcarata Barb.Rodr. (1882)	Has the intermediate lobe of the labellum approximately triangular and the lateral ones square	Brazil (Bahia, Espirito Santo, Rio de Janeiro and São Paulo)	300–900 metres (980–2,950 ft)
	B. mellicolor Barb.Rodr. (1882)	has more rounded lobes.	Brazil (Bahia, Espirito Santo and Rio de Janeiro)	500–1,000 metres (1,600–3,300 ft)

- The second subgroup also is formed by plants that show a pollinarium with entire stipe but the callus is entirely salient and fleshy. It is formed by the two species Senghas moved to genus Cydoniorchis,

Image	Scientific name	Description	Distribution	Elevation (m)
	B. tetragona (Lindl.) Schltr. 1908	Presents a totally smooth labellum with rounded apex	Brazil (Espiritu Santo to Rio Grande do Sul and Minas Gerais)	300–1,200 metres (980–3,940 ft)
	B. wittigii (Rchb.f.) Hoehne 1953	Has a partially pubescent labellum of acute apex.	Brazil (Espirito Santo and Rio de Janeiro )	1,000–2,000 metres (3,300–6,600 ft)

- The third subgroup is formed by the six species with a bifurcated stipe. The species of this group are often or exclusively lithophytes.:

Image	Scientific name	Description	Distribution	Elevation (m)
	B. atropurpurea (Lodd.)Lindley 1832	only species with a cuneated viscidium	Brazil (Minas Gerais, Rio de Janeiro)	200–2,000 metres (660–6,560 ft)
	B. tyrianthina (Loudon) Rchb. f. 1858	only species to have rounded viscidium	Brazil (Bahia, Espirito Santo and Minas Gerais)	1,000–2,000 metres (3,300–6,600 ft)
	B. inodora Lindl. 1843	greenish flowers and two lobed callus	Brazil (Espirito Santo, Rio Grande do Sul, Parana, Santa Catarina, São Paulo)	50–1,000 metres (160–3,280 ft)
	B. harrisoniae (Hooker)Rchb.f 1855	highly variable species of several colors, that always has three lobed callus on the labellum	Brazil (Espirito Santo, Minas Gerais, Parana, Rio Grande do Sul, Santa Catarina, Rio de Janeiro)	200–700 metres (660–2,300 ft)
	B. diamantinensis Capacci & Rosim 2020	densely hairy column, a longer lip and a longer column foot and spur than B. harrisoniae.	Brazil (Bahia)	920 metres (3,020 ft)
	B. verboonenii G.A.Romero & V.P.Castro 2000		Brazil (Minas Gerais)	1,000–1,400 metres (3,300–4,600 ft)

Small species: is formed by the plants that once belonged to Stenocoryne, or more accurately, Adipe, which normally are epiphytes. They present smaller and not as noticeably four sided pseudobulbs, and long and delicate inflorescence bearing a higher medium number of flowers than the large species, although also never surpassing ten. The flowers are smaller and not fleshy, with an entire labellum, or sometimes slightly lobed on the apex. These species take less luminosity and more humidity than those and are not particularly fragrant. According to their morphology they can be split in four distinct subgroups:

- The first subgroup is formed by the two Amazonian species, with elongated rhizome:

Image	Scientific name	Description	Distribution	Elevation (m)
	B. venezuelana C.Schweinf. (1965)	short inflorescence and highly reduced calcar	Venezuela (Rio Negro, Bolivar)	1,000–1,400 metres (3,300–4,600 ft)
	B. longicornis Lindl. (1838)	long inflorescence and noticeable calcar.	Trinidad & Tobago, French Guiana, Surinam, Guyana, Venezuela, Colombia, Peru and Brazil	50–600 metres (160–1,970 ft)

- Within the second subgroup sepals and petals lanceolate, flowers orange to dark yellow, there is only one species:

Image	Scientific name	Description	Distribution	Elevation (m)
	B. aureofulva Lindl. (1843)	bright orange flowers with acute sepals, petals and labellum, which do not open well.	Brazil (Bahia, Minas Gerais, Parana, Rio de Janeiro and São Paulo)	200–1,500 metres (660–4,920 ft)

- The third subgroup is formed by the two species which present petals que apresentam petals parallel to the column; These two species are hard to separate due to the high number of intermediate varieties:

Image	Scientific name	Description	Distribution	Elevation (m)
	B. charlesworthii Barb.Rodr. (1882)	More open and hairy flowers	Brazil ( Bahia, Espirito Santo and Rio De Janeiro)	300–1,000 metres (980–3,280 ft)
	B. racemosa (Hook.) Lindl. (1843)	Lateral sepals parallel to each other, labellum scantly pubescent	Brazil (Rio de Janeiro, São Paulo, Espirito Santo and Minas Gerais )	300–1,000 metres (980–3,280 ft)

- The last subgroup is formed by species that present petals oblique to the column. Two have petals and sepals marked with other colors:

Image	Scientific name	Description	Distribution	Elevation (m)
	B. clavigera Rchb.f. (1865)	Has a calcar formed by the fusion of the lateral sepals bases	Brazil ( Rio de Janeiro and Espirito Santo )	800–1,000 metres (2,600–3,300 ft)
	B. silvana V.P. Castro (1991)	the calcar is a result of their superposition	Brazil (Bahia)	500–1,000 metres (1,600–3,300 ft)
	B. leucorhoda Rchb.f. (1859)	has white flowers with labellum veined of pink color	Brazil (Espirito Santo, Rio de Janeiro, and São Paulo)	500–1,500 metres (1,600–4,900 ft)
	B. stefanae V.P. Castro (1991)	the smaller and often paler yellow flowers	Brazil (Minas Gerais, Parana, Rio de Janeiro and São Paulo)	900–1,350 metres (2,950–4,430 ft)
	B. vitellina (Lindl.) Lindl. (1843)	larger and of brighter color yellow flowers	Brazil (Espirito Santo, Minas Gerais, Rio de Janeiro and São Paulo )	600–1,200 metres (2,000–3,900 ft)

Other species: the remaining species are plants about which classification consensus has not been achieved: Bifrenaria maguirei, also classified under the genus Guanchezia, and Bifrenaria grandis, under Lacaena. Bifrenaria steyermarkii is a species highly different from all other Bifrenaria because its inflorescence is very long ant its flowers highly narrow, therefore it does not fit in any group, nevertheless the only other option of classification that has been published so far is under Xylobium what possibly is not a choice either.

== Distribution and habitat ==
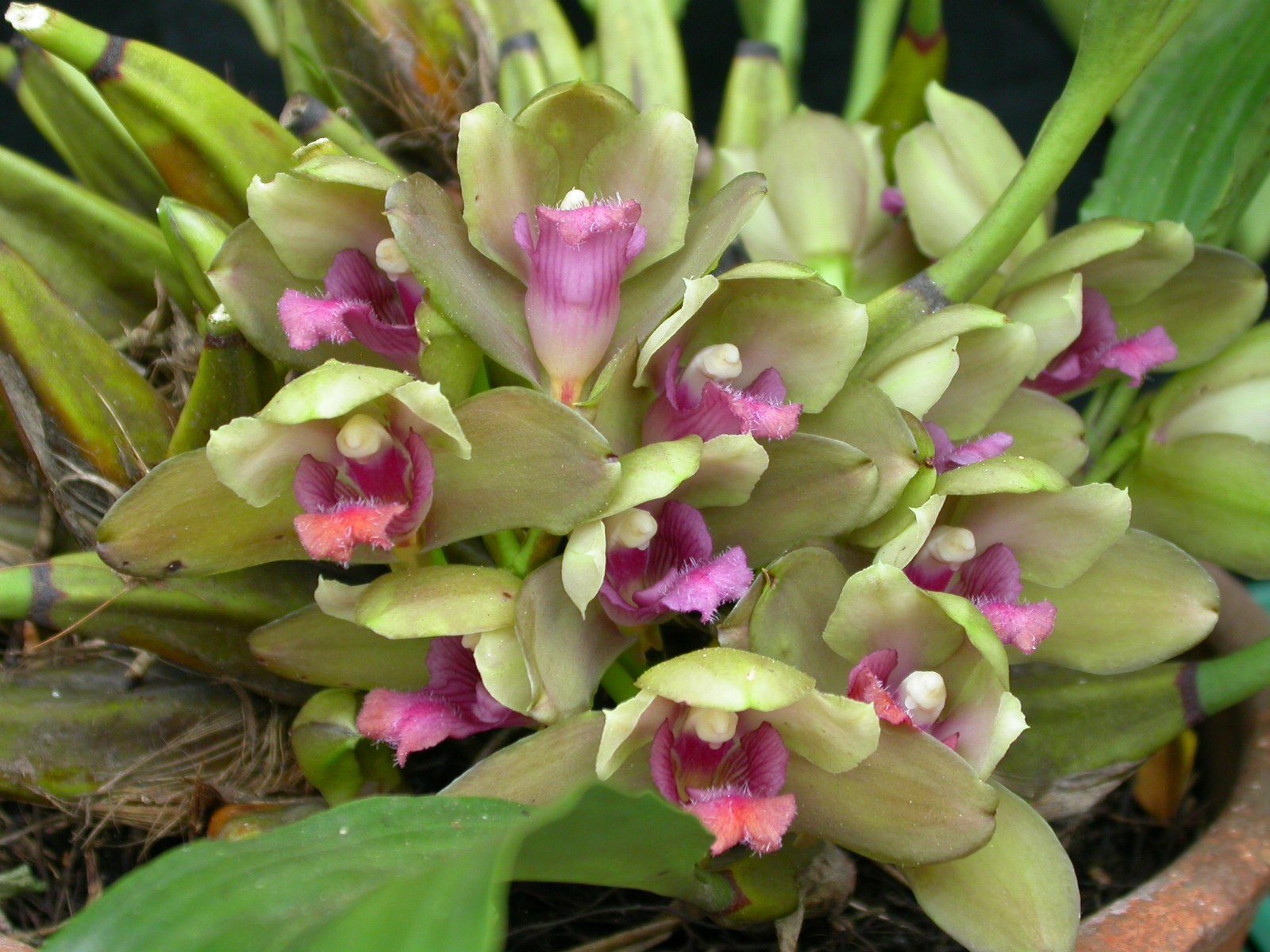
Bifrenaria inodora Despite described with the name of B. inodora, this large species is one of the most fragrant Bifrenaria. It has two main varieties, the one on the photo was also described as B. fuerstenbergiana and has this varietal name, the other one is greener and has a yellow labellum.

Bifrenaria exist from the north of South America, one species reaching Trinidad, until Rio Grande do Sul, the farther south State in Brazil, however they are split in two isolated areas: Amazon Forest and Atlantic Forest of Brazil. The later, where seventeen species are present, may be considered their recente center of distribution. The montane area of Rio de Janeiro State and Espírito Santo is particularly rich with fifteen species registered. Serra dos Órgãos mountains area, in Rio, is reported as habitat of fourteen Bifrenaria species, however, some of these species are considered synonyms today, being eleven a more realistic number of species existing in the said area.

The species with large flowers are more common on Region Southeast of Brazil, however, they inhabit from the sunnier areas of the seashore to rocky mountain areas of Minas Gerais e Bahia States, from almost sea level up to 2,000 meters of altitude, some species reaching Rio Grande do Sul state. No species of large flowers exist in Amazon Forest. Some species grow directly attached to the famous Sugarloaf Mountain in Rio de Janeiro which can be observed by the commuters in the cable car. The recent centers of irradiation of this group are the seashore close to Serra do Mar chain of mountains, and the high chains of mountains of Minas Gerais. The most common species in this group, spread from Rio Grande do Sul to Bahia, is B. harrisoniae.

The smaller species of Bifrenaria, which some taxonomists classify under the genus Adipe, are more common on less sunny areas and can be found between 300 and about 1,600 meters of altitude. Six species are native in Serra do Mar Chain of mountains and its arms, place considered the center of distribution of the small species. Only three small species inhabit Amazon, B. longicornis, which is more common at low artitudes; Bifrenaria venezuelana, up to 1,450 meter of altitude, and B. steyermarkii from even higher altitudes, in Roraima State, in Brasil, and nearby areas in Venezuela and Suriname.

The most common species is B. aureofulva, however, because the geographic characteristic of its territory, without obstacles, B. longicornis is the species spread throughout the largest area, reaching Colombia, Venezuela, Peru, Suriname, Guyanas, Trinidad and all Amazonic area in Brazil. Two species seem to be endemic in highly restricted areas: B. silvana. discovered in 1987 at Serra da Ouricana mountains, nearby Itororó, in Bahia which belongs to Adipe group; and B. verboonenii, discovered in September 1995 on Serra do Cipó mountains, close to Diamantina, Minas Gerais, of the large Bifrenara group.

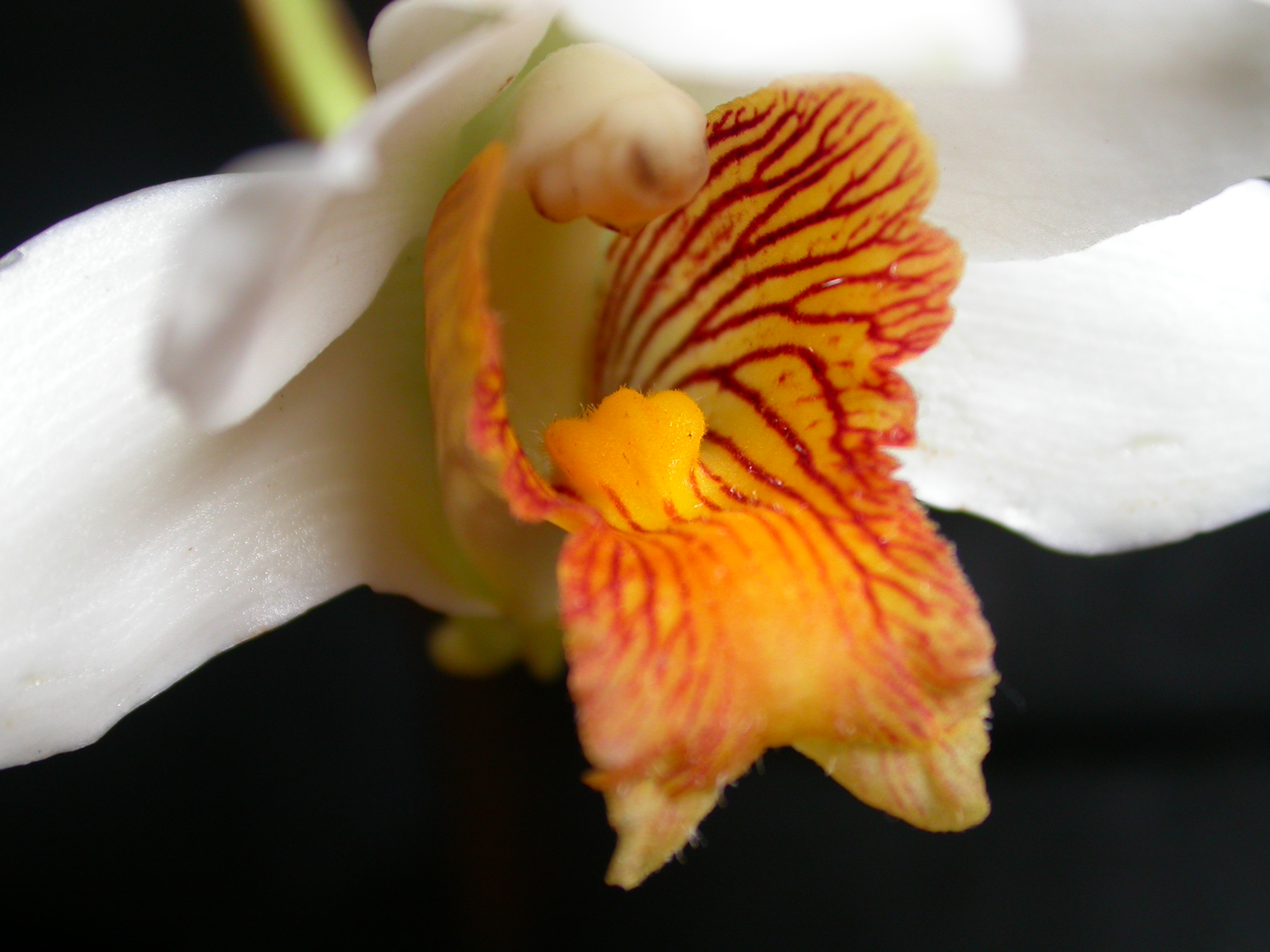
Bifrenaria harrisoniae This is the most variable species of all Bifrenaria: there are numberless colors varieties. It can be distinguished from B. tyrianthyna only through its three keeled callus and shorter calcar.

Bifrenaria species inhabit three different environments. The large species generally live in well illuminated areas, occasionally epiphyte on trees of sparse foliage, more often as lithophytes, in campos rupestres, montane rocky areas that exist mostly in Rio and Minas Gerais States of Brazil, or over rocks in jungle's clearances. B. tyrianthina is exclusively lithophyte, B. tetragona and B. wittigii hardly ever do. B. atropurpurea is the only species found living terrestrially, but in rare occasions. The large species always show .

The small species from Southeast Brazil live in cloud montane forests, where the appear in much darker places than the large species. Within this sort of forests the temperature presents noticeable difference between day and night and also through the seasons. These also are plants of caespitous growth, almost all epiphytes, despite there is at least one record of Bifrenaria aureofulva living lithophylically in Chapada Diamantina, Bahia.

The species from Amazon inhabit tropical lowland forests and equatorial forests. Bifrenaria longicornis is mostly found in flood areas along the igapós and igarapés (seasonal flood streams and small rivers of Amazon), and occasionally in open fields where the humidity is high and temperature constant through the year, normally in well illuminated places, although not under direct sunlight. B. venezuelana inhabits forests in higher elevations, closer to the Andes. Amazon species are epiphyte and the only Bifrenaria species with elongated rhizome and ascendant growth.

== Cultivation ==
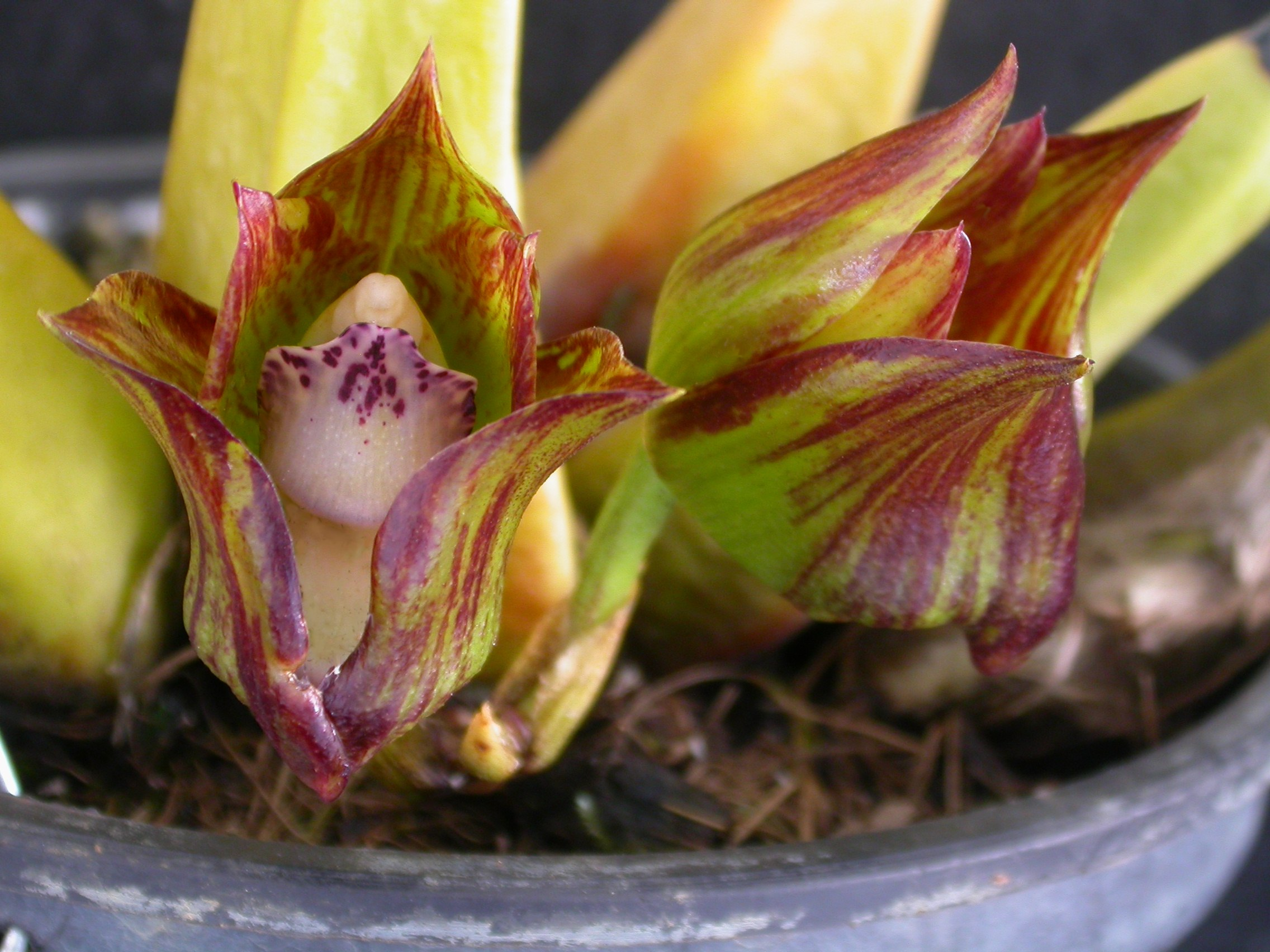
Bifrenaria tetragona has a strong scent of rotten meat and is not suitable for house decoration.

Bifrenaria are comparatively easy to grow orchids. They should be preferably potted on well drained vegetable fiber because their roots and pseudobulbs rot easily when kept humid for long periods. One of three different environments is needed depending on the species' origin to successfully grow these plants. The larger species need more light than the others. The smaller species from Southeast Brazil may be cultivated at the same medium temperature but under less than 10-20% luminosity. Bifrenaria from the Amazon Forest require higher and more constant temperature and humidity than other species. All species need most water and fertilizer during their active growth season.
