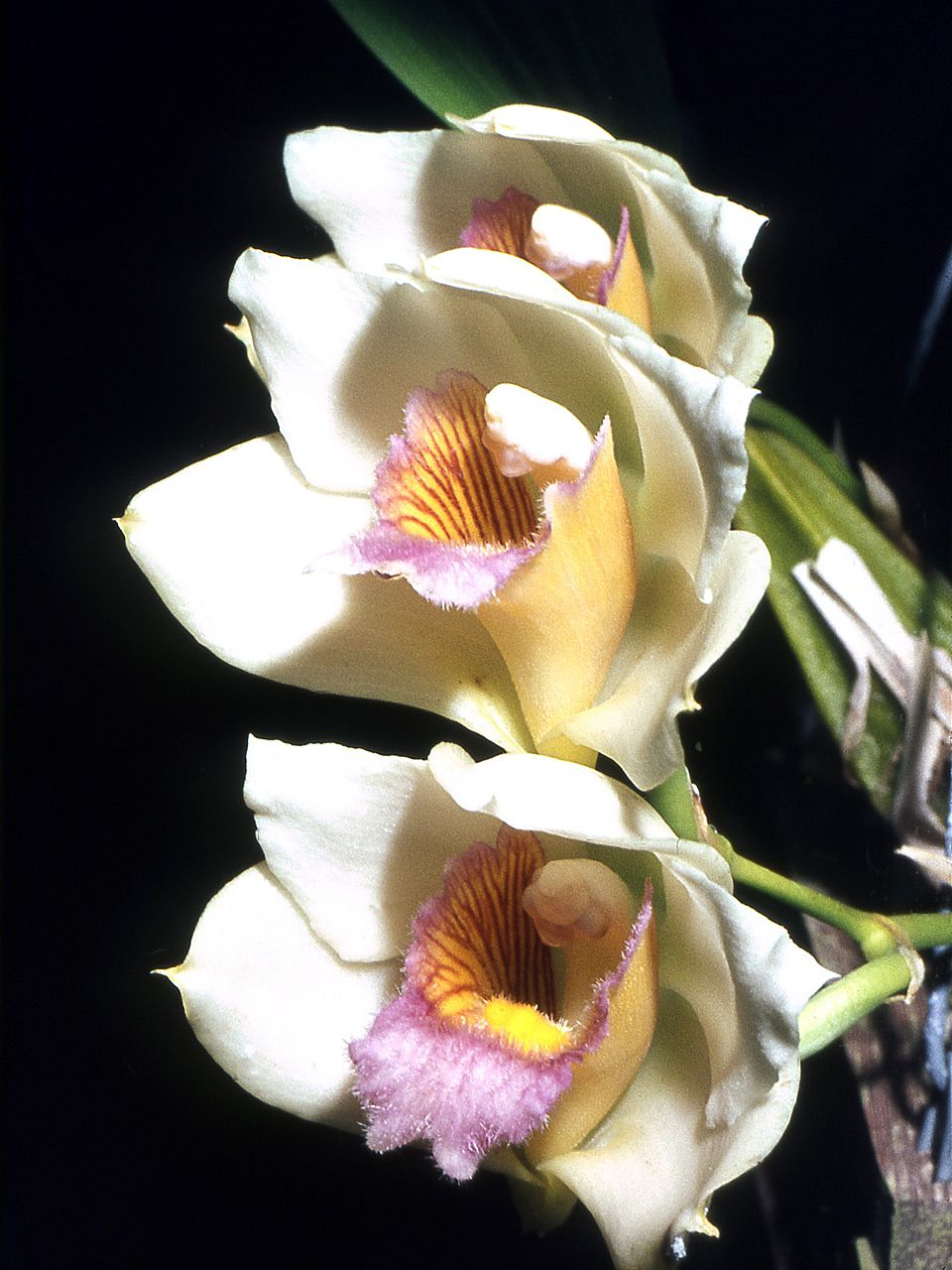

Scientific classification
- Kingdom: Plantae
- Clade: Tracheophytes
- Clade: Angiosperms
- Clade: Monocots
- Order: Asparagales
- Family: Orchidaceae
- Subfamily: Epidendroideae
- Genus: Bifrenaria
- Species: B. tyrianthina

Binomial name
- Bifrenaria tyrianthina (Lodd. ex Loudon) Rchb.f. (1854)

Synonyms
- Lycaste tyrianthina Lodd. ex Loudon (1850) (Basionym); Maxillaria tyrianthina (Lodd. ex Loudon) W. Baxter (1850); Bifrenaria tyrianthina var. magnicalcarata Hoehne (1950); Bifrenaria magnicalcarata (Hoehne) Pabst (1976)

= Bifrenaria tyrianthina =

Species of orchid

Bifrenaria tyrianthina is a species of orchid found in Brazil.

== Description ==
It is an herbaceous species that prefers cool to warm weather, it is epiphytic or lithophytic with a broadly ovoid-pyriform, angled, deeply sulcate pseudobulb with a single, apical, oblong-elliptic, suberect, obtuse or subacute, fine-textured leaf. It flowers in a basal, raceme-shaped inflorescence 7.5 cm long, erect, rigid with 1 to 4 long-lasting, fragrant, fleshy flowers produced from a mature pseudobulb. This species, although similar to Bifrenaria harrisoniae, differs by its long spur that is twice as long as the column and its narrow stipe. Flowering occurs in spring and early summer.

== Distribution ==
It is found in the states of Bahia, Espírito Santo, and Minas Gerais in Brazil at elevations of 1000 to 2000 meters, in an area with a winter dry season, they live in well-lit areas, often on rocks fully exposed to the sun or partially sheltered.

== Taxonomy ==
Bifrenaria tyrianthina was described by (Lodd. ex Loudon) Rchb.f. and published in Xenia Orchidacea 1: 61. 1858.
