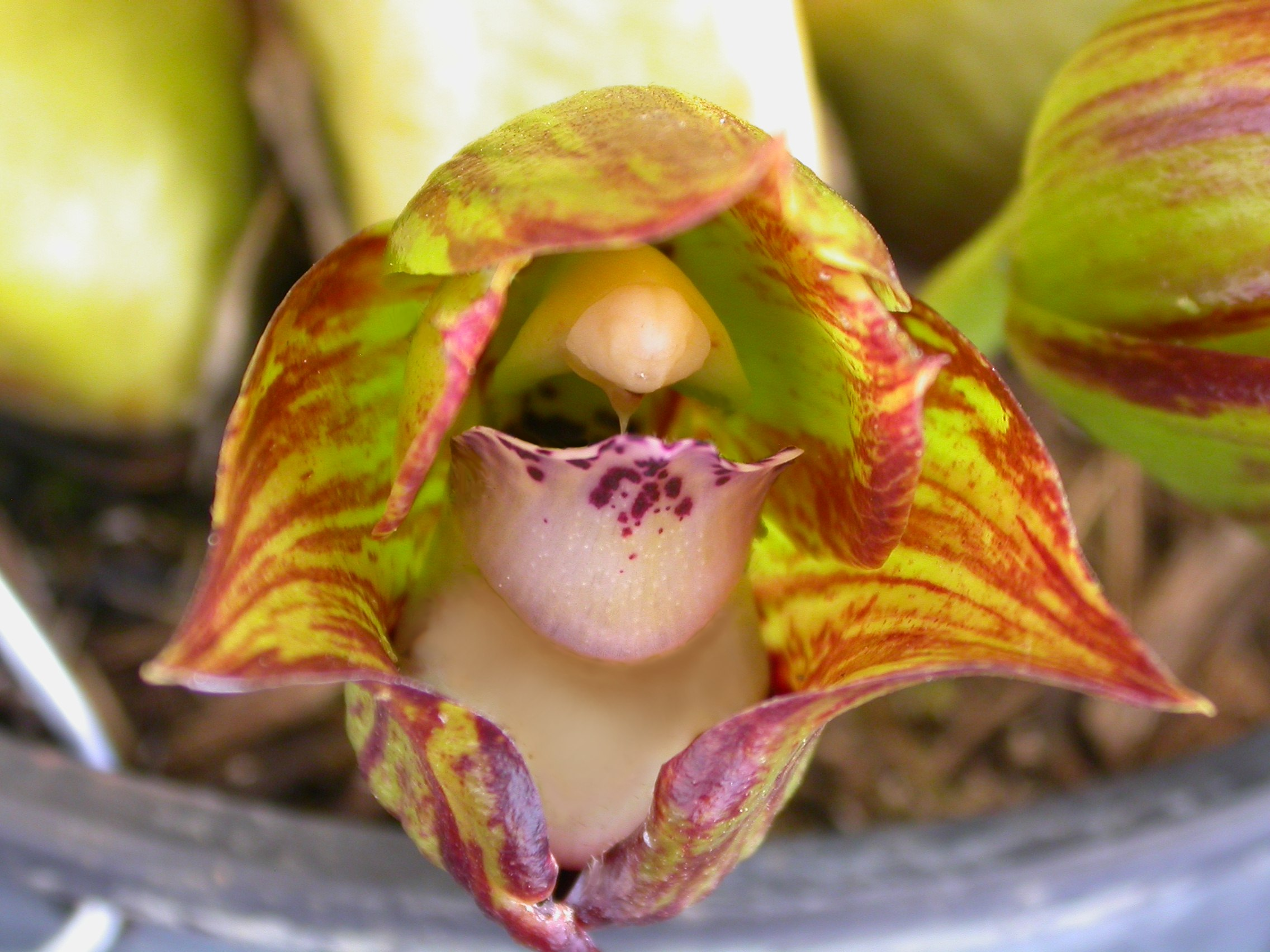

Scientific classification
- Kingdom: Plantae
- Clade: Tracheophytes
- Clade: Angiosperms
- Clade: Monocots
- Order: Asparagales
- Family: Orchidaceae
- Subfamily: Epidendroideae
- Genus: Bifrenaria
- Species: B. tetragona

Binomial name
- Bifrenaria tetragona (Lindl.) Schltr. (1914)

Synonyms
- Maxillaria tetragona Lindl. (1831) (Basionym); Lycaste tetragona (Lindl.) Lindl. (1843); Bifrenaria tetragona var. rupicola Hoehne (1950); Bifrenaria tetragona var. umbrophila Hoehne (1950); Cydoniorchis tetragona (Lindl.) Senghas (1994); Bifrenaria calcarata (Vell.) V.P. Castro (1996)

= Bifrenaria tetragona =

Species of orchid

Bifrenaria tetragona is a species of orchid.

== Description ==
It is a medium-sized herbaceous species that prefers a warm to cool climate, it is epiphytic and occasionally lithophytic, it is found in open spaces, generally among rocks with four angled ovoid pseudobulbs and a single, apical, fleshy, elliptical and narrow leaf. short, raceme-shaped inflorescence with long-lasting, waxy flowers produced in spring and summer in Brazil. This species emanates a very strong scent of rotten meat.

With Bifrenaria wittigii, it is found in the section of Bifrenaria, which, by presenting fleshy lips, form a species very different from all the others, sometimes classified in the genus Cydoniorchis. Although very similar to B. wittigii, with hair on the central lobe of the lip, giving it a velvety appearance, the lip of B. tetragona is flat.

== Distribution ==
It is found in the coastal Atlantic forest, in southeastern Brazil in the area of montane tropical forests at elevations of 300 to 1,200 meters. It grows in the states of Espiritu Santo to Rio Grande do Sul and Minas Gerais, in Brazil, and lives in humid or dry forests, but with plenty of sun.

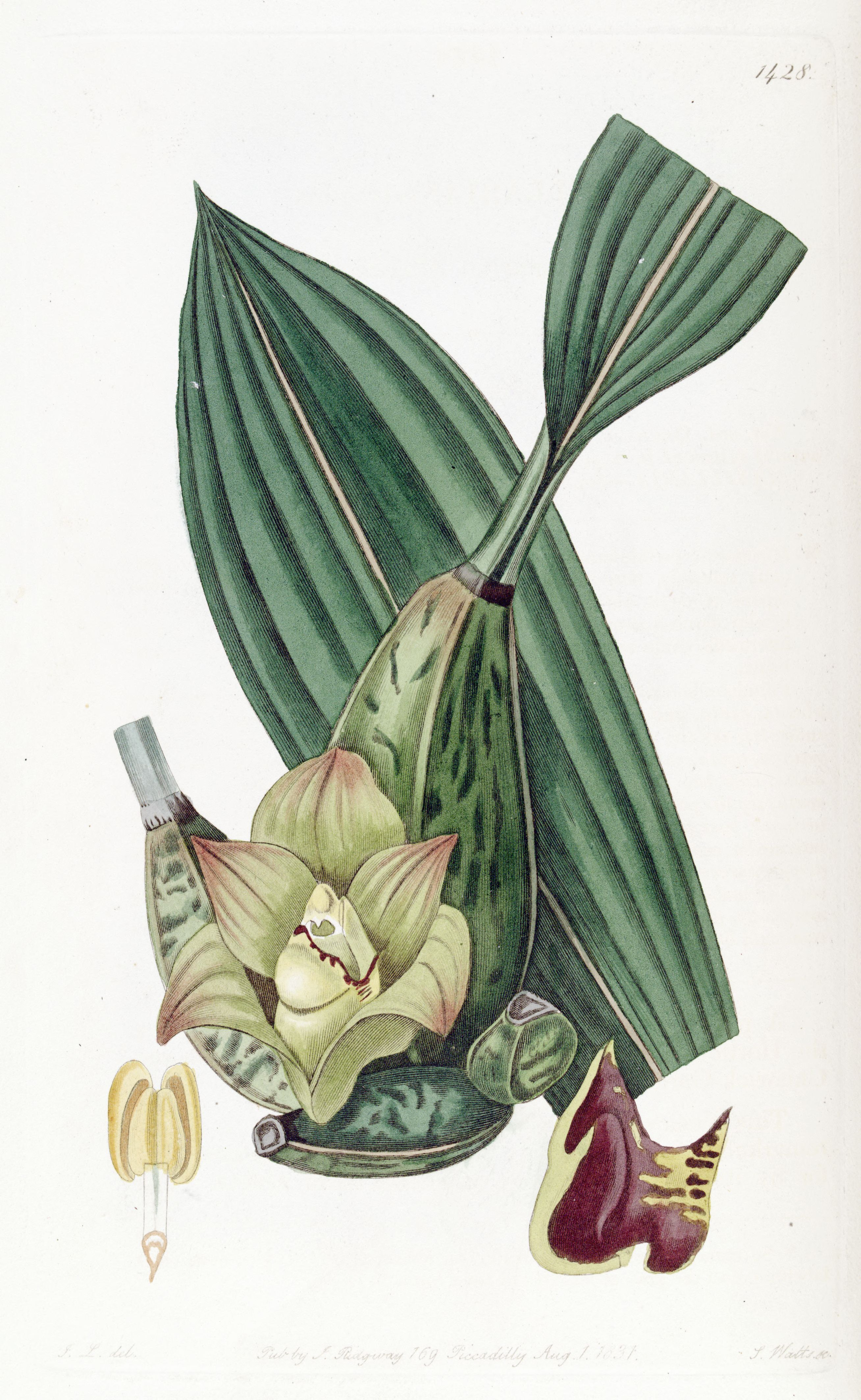
Bifrenaria tetragona (as syn. Maxillaria tetragona) in Edwards's Botanical Register, Volume 17, Plate 1428
