= R. floribunda =

R. floribunda may refer to:

- Rhodanthe floribunda, a plant endemic to Australia
- Rudolfiella floribunda, an orchid native to western South America
