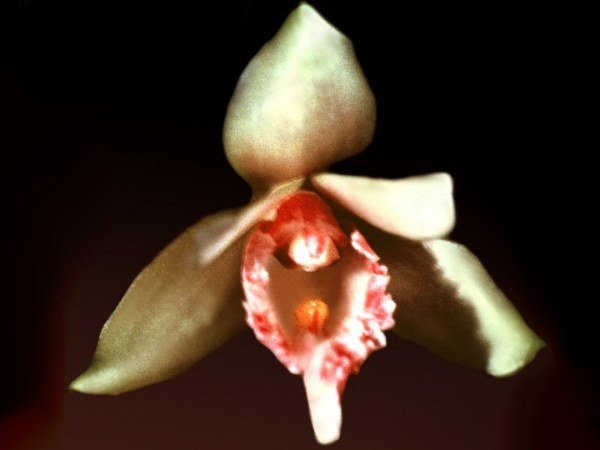

Scientific classification
- Kingdom: Plantae
- Clade: Tracheophytes
- Clade: Angiosperms
- Clade: Monocots
- Order: Asparagales
- Family: Orchidaceae
- Subfamily: Epidendroideae
- Genus: Bifrenaria
- Species: B. clavigera

Binomial name
- Bifrenaria clavigera Rchb.f. (1865)

Synonyms
- Stenocoryne wendlandiana Kraenzl. (1896); Bifrenaria wendlandiana (Kraenzl.) Cogn. (1902); Adipe clavigera (Rchb.f.) M. Wolff (1990); Adipe wendlandiana (Kraenzl.) M. Wolff (1990)

= Bifrenaria clavigera =

Species of orchid

Bifrenaria clavigera is a species of orchid.
