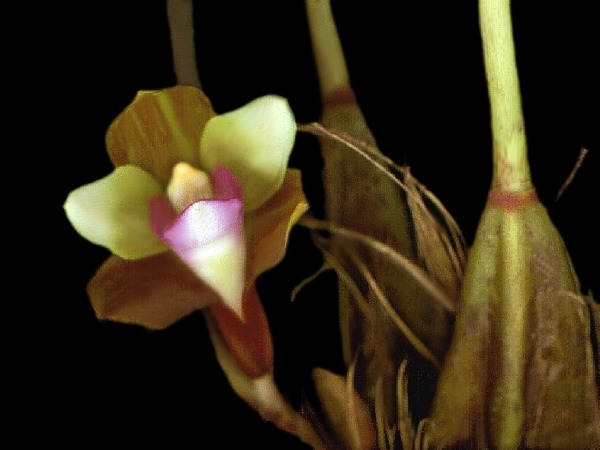

Scientific classification
- Kingdom: Plantae
- Clade: Tracheophytes
- Clade: Angiosperms
- Clade: Monocots
- Order: Asparagales
- Family: Orchidaceae
- Subfamily: Epidendroideae
- Genus: Bifrenaria
- Species: B. calcarata

Binomial name
- Bifrenaria calcarata Barb.Rodr. (1882)

Synonyms
- Bifrenaria barbosae V.P. Castro (1998)

= Bifrenaria calcarata =

Species of orchid

Bifrenaria calcarata is a species of orchid.

== Description ==
It is a small and medium-sized herbaceous species that prefers hot to cold weather. It is epiphytic with tetragonal-conical pseudobulbs with a single, erect, ellipitic-elongated, acuminate leaf that blooms in a basal inflorescence with few fragrant flowers. Flowering occurs in late spring and early summer.
