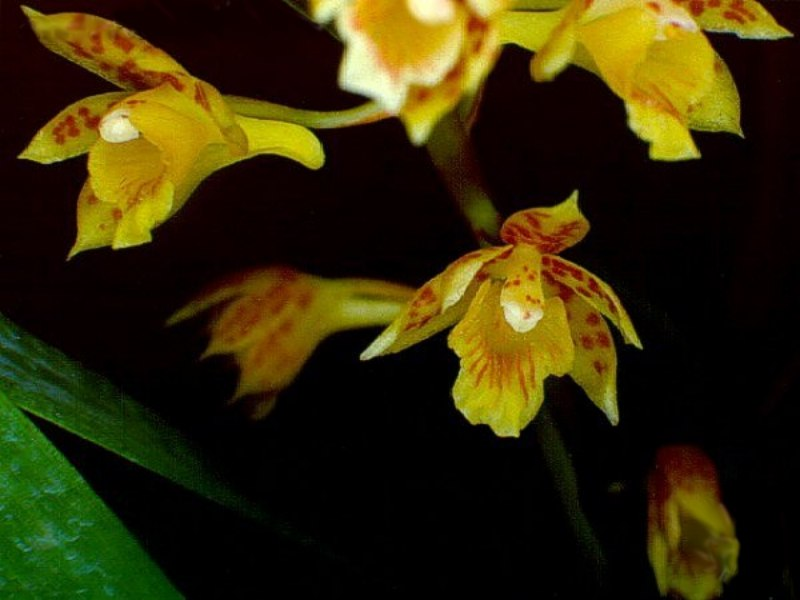

Scientific classification
- Kingdom: Plantae
- Clade: Tracheophytes
- Clade: Angiosperms
- Clade: Monocots
- Order: Asparagales
- Family: Orchidaceae
- Subfamily: Epidendroideae
- Genus: Bifrenaria
- Species: B. longicornis

Binomial name
- Bifrenaria longicornis Lindl. (1838)

Synonyms
- Stenocoryne longicornis (Lindl.) Lindl. (1843); Bifrenaria sabulosa Barb.Rodr. (1877); Schlechterella sabulosa (Barb.Rodr.) Hoehne (1944); Rudolfiella sabulosa (Barb.Rodr.) Hoehne (1953); Adipe longicornis (Lindl.) M. Wolff (1990)

= Bifrenaria longicornis =

Species of orchid

Bifrenaria longicornis is a species of orchid.
