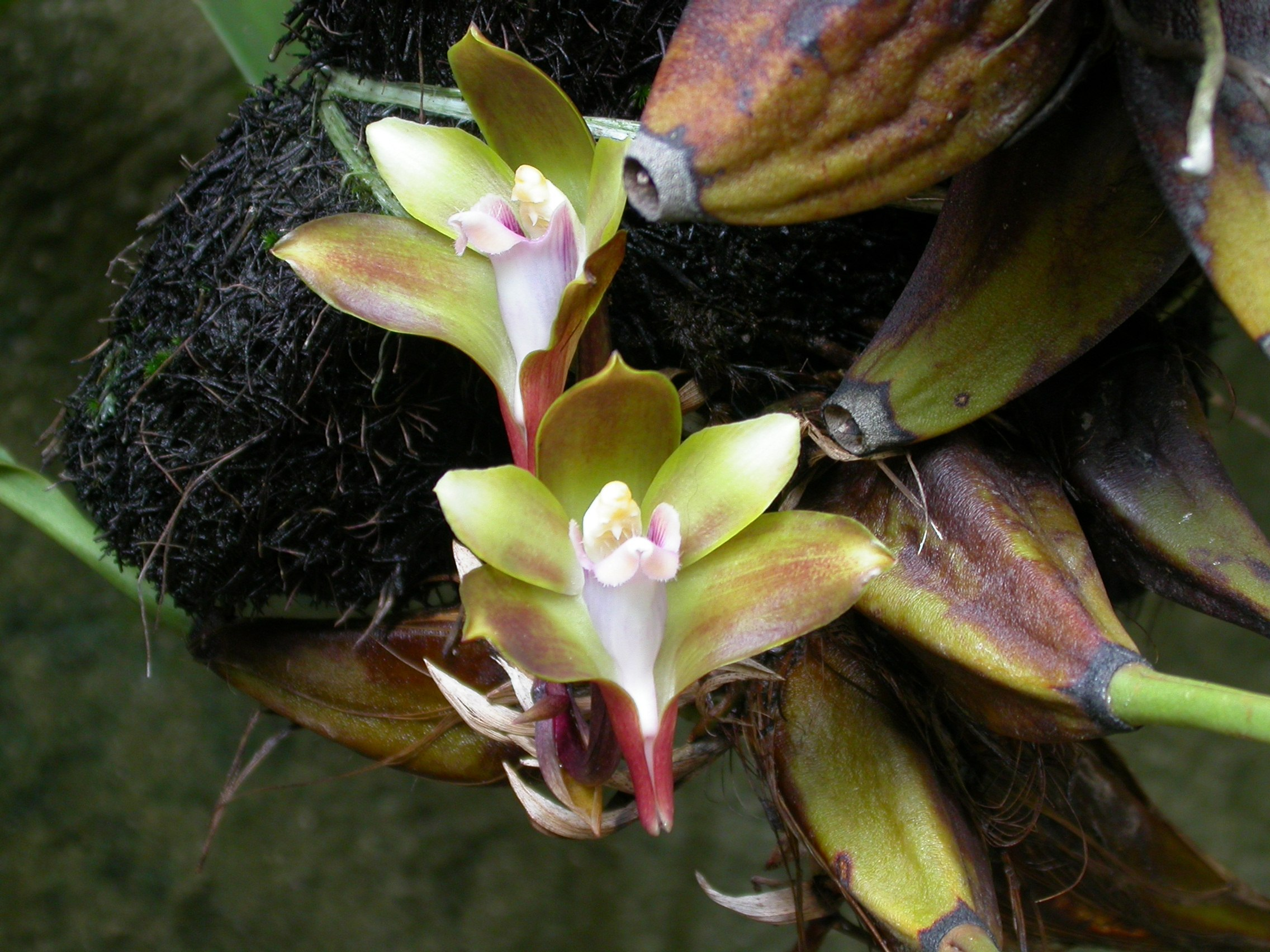

Scientific classification
- Kingdom: Plantae
- Clade: Tracheophytes
- Clade: Angiosperms
- Clade: Monocots
- Order: Asparagales
- Family: Orchidaceae
- Subfamily: Epidendroideae
- Genus: Bifrenaria
- Species: B. mellicolor

Binomial name
- Bifrenaria mellicolor Rchb.f. (1878)

= Bifrenaria mellicolor =

Species of orchid

Bifrenaria mellicolor is a species of orchid.
