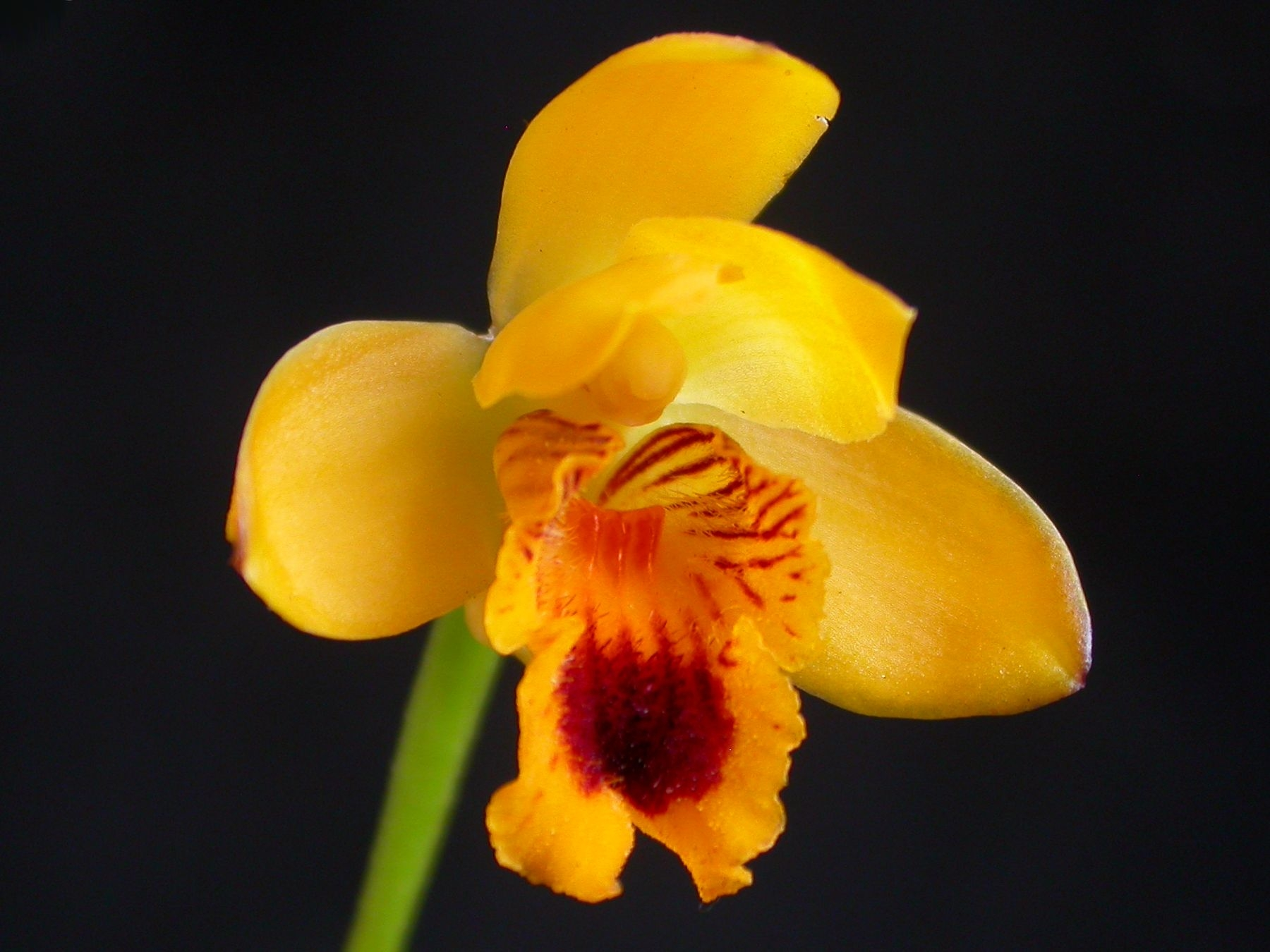

Scientific classification
- Kingdom: Plantae
- Clade: Tracheophytes
- Clade: Angiosperms
- Clade: Monocots
- Order: Asparagales
- Family: Orchidaceae
- Subfamily: Epidendroideae
- Genus: Bifrenaria
- Species: B. vitellina

Binomial name
- Bifrenaria vitellina (Lindl.) Lindl. (1843)

Synonyms
- Maxillaria vitellina Lindl. (1838)(Basionym); Maxillaria barbata Knowles & Westc. ex Rchb.f. (1863); Adipe vitellina (Lindl.) M. Wolff (1990)

= Bifrenaria vitellina =

Species of orchid

Bifrenaria vitellina is a species of orchid found in Brazil.
