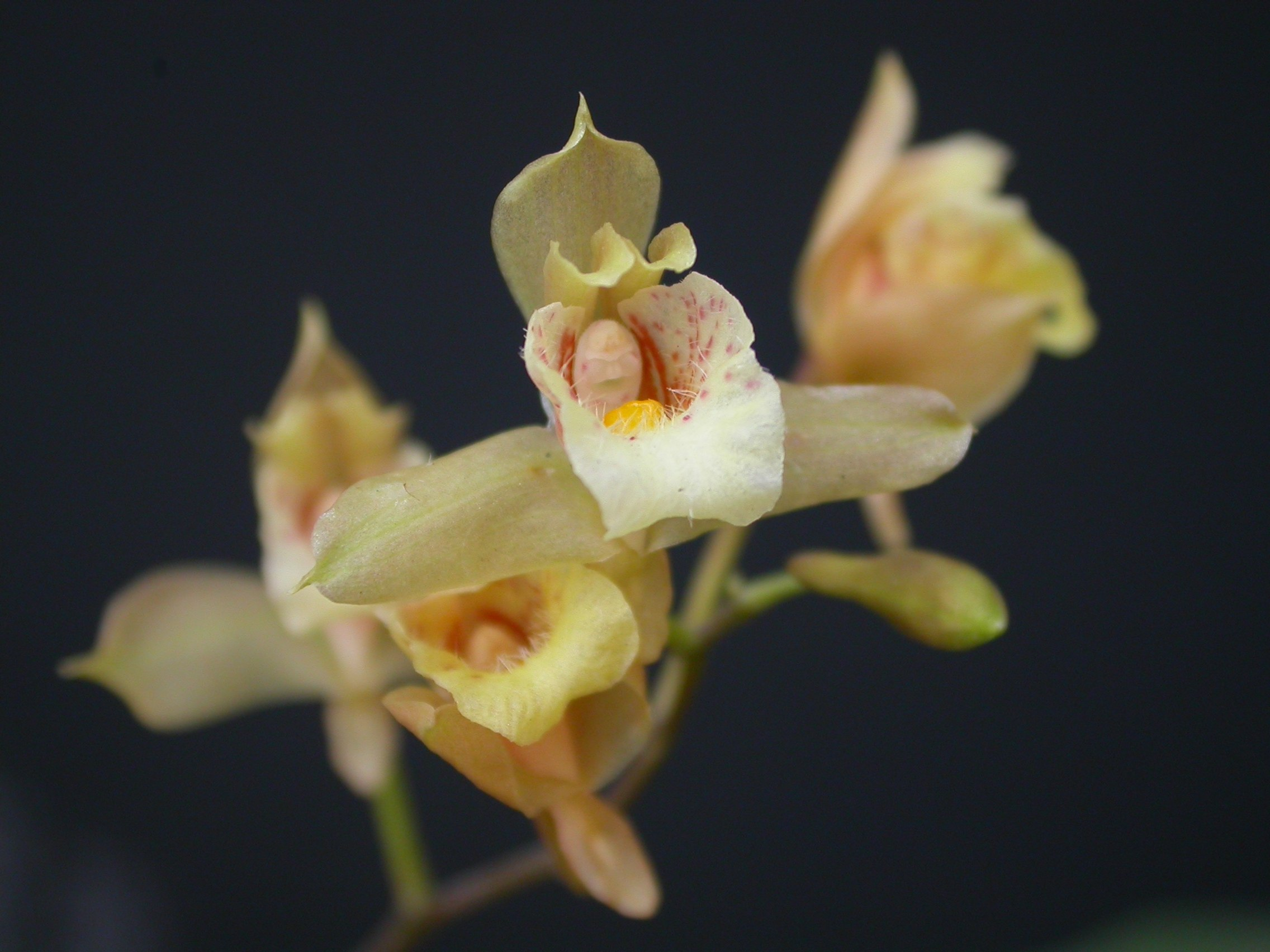

Scientific classification
- Kingdom: Plantae
- Clade: Tracheophytes
- Clade: Angiosperms
- Clade: Monocots
- Order: Asparagales
- Family: Orchidaceae
- Subfamily: Epidendroideae
- Genus: Bifrenaria
- Species: B. racemosa

Binomial name
- Bifrenaria racemosa (Hook.) Lindl. (1843)

Synonyms
- Maxillaria racemosa Hook. (1827) (Basionym); Colax racemosus (Hook.) A. Spreng. (1828); Xylobium racemosum (Hook.) Sweet (1830); Adipe racemosa (Hook.) Raf. (1837); Adipe fulva Raf. (1837); Bifrenaria melanopoda Klotzsch (1855); Stenocoryne melanopoda (Klotzsch) Hoehne (1944); Adipe melanopoda (Klotzsch) M. Wolff (1990)

= Bifrenaria racemosa =

Species of orchid

Bifrenaria racemosa is a species of orchid.
