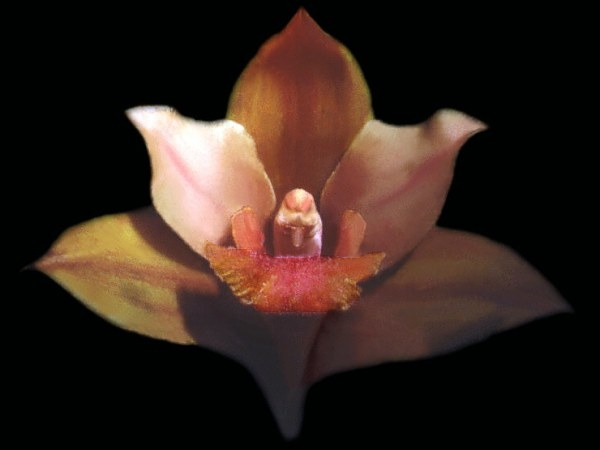

Scientific classification
- Kingdom: Plantae
- Clade: Tracheophytes
- Clade: Angiosperms
- Clade: Monocots
- Order: Asparagales
- Family: Orchidaceae
- Subfamily: Epidendroideae
- Genus: Bifrenaria
- Species: B. verboonenii

Binomial name
- Bifrenaria verboonenii G.A.Romero & V.P.Castro (2000)

= Bifrenaria verboonenii =

Species of orchid

Bifrenaria verboonenii is a species of orchid.
