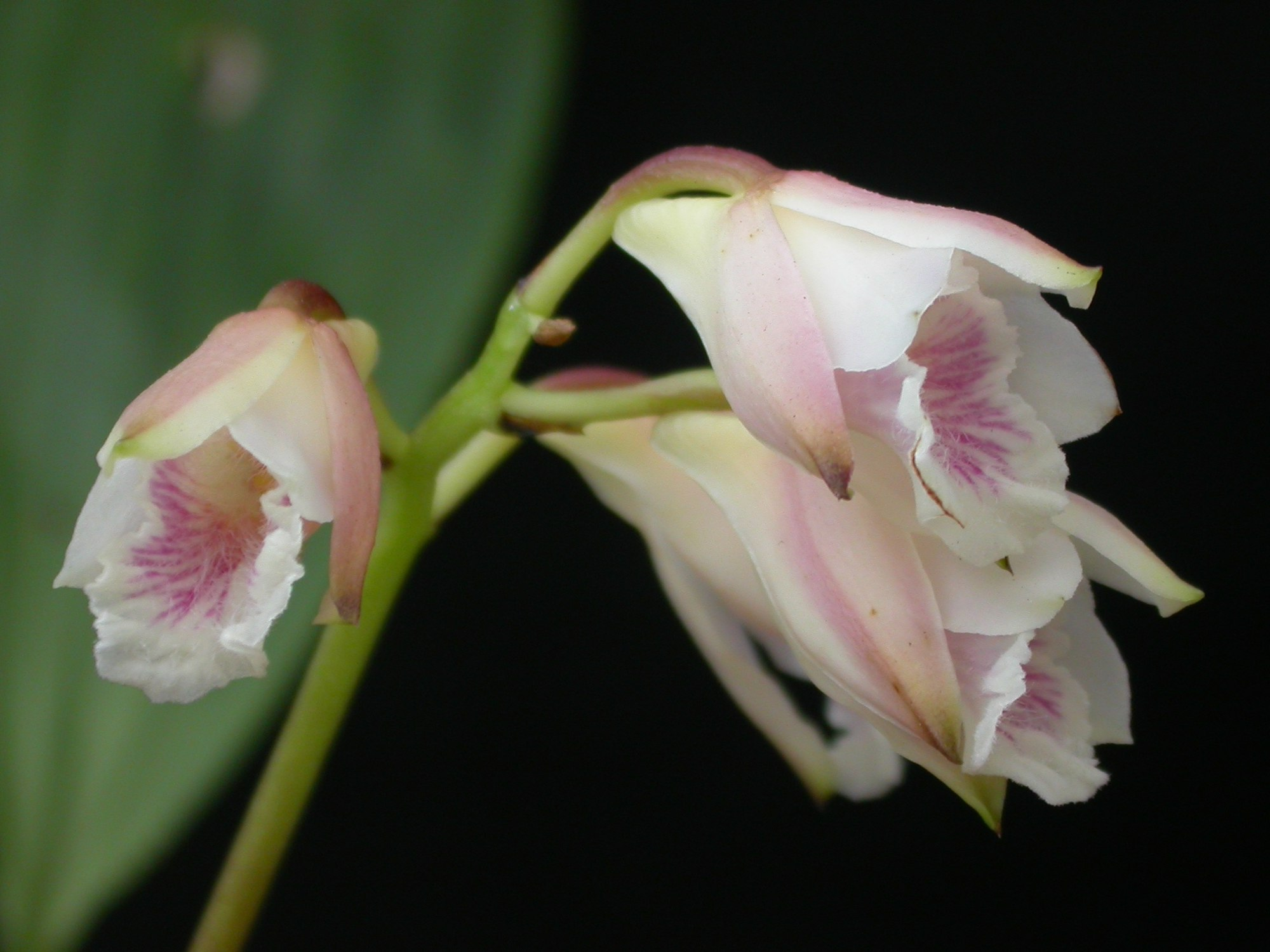

Scientific classification
- Kingdom: Plantae
- Clade: Tracheophytes
- Clade: Angiosperms
- Clade: Monocots
- Order: Asparagales
- Family: Orchidaceae
- Subfamily: Epidendroideae
- Genus: Bifrenaria
- Species: B. leucorhoda

Binomial name
- Bifrenaria leucorhoda Rchb.f. (1859)

Synonyms
- Bifrenaria leucorhoda var. macaheensis Brade (1944); Adipe leucorhoda (Rchb.f.) M. Wolff (1990); Adipe leucorhoda var. macaheensis (Brade) M. Wolff (1990)

= Bifrenaria leucorhoda =

Species of orchid

Bifrenaria leucorhoda is a species of orchid native to southeastern Brazil.
