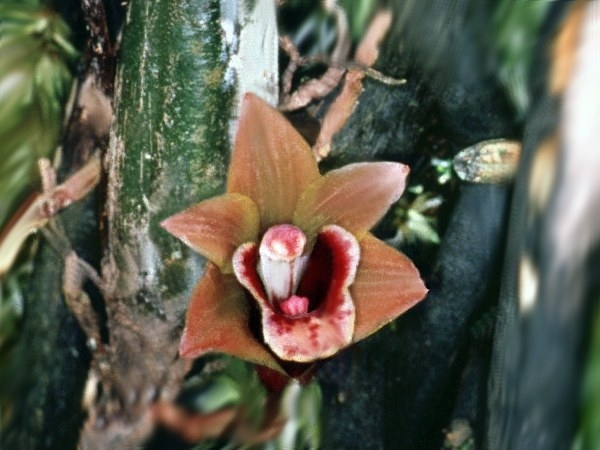

Scientific classification
- Kingdom: Plantae
- Clade: Tracheophytes
- Clade: Angiosperms
- Clade: Monocots
- Order: Asparagales
- Family: Orchidaceae
- Subfamily: Epidendroideae
- Genus: Bifrenaria
- Species: B. venezuelana

Binomial name
- Bifrenaria venezuelana C.Schweinf. (1965)

= Bifrenaria venezuelana =

Species of orchid

Bifrenaria venezuelana is a species of orchid.
