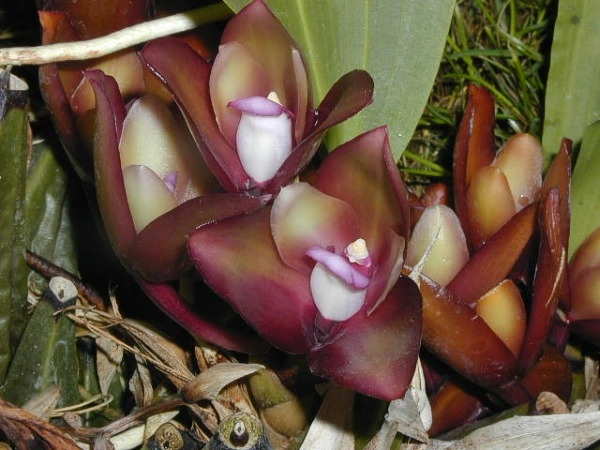

Scientific classification
- Kingdom: Plantae
- Clade: Tracheophytes
- Clade: Angiosperms
- Clade: Monocots
- Order: Asparagales
- Family: Orchidaceae
- Subfamily: Epidendroideae
- Genus: Bifrenaria
- Species: B. atropurpurea

Binomial name
- Bifrenaria atropurpurea Lindl. (1832)

Synonyms
- Maxillaria atropurpurea Lodd. (1832) (Basionym); Bifrenaria caparaoensis Brade (1943); Bifrenaria atropurpurea var. caparaoensis (Brade) Hoehne (1950)

= Bifrenaria atropurpurea =

Species of orchid

Bifrenaria atropurpurea is a species of orchid and the type species of the genus Bifrenaria.
