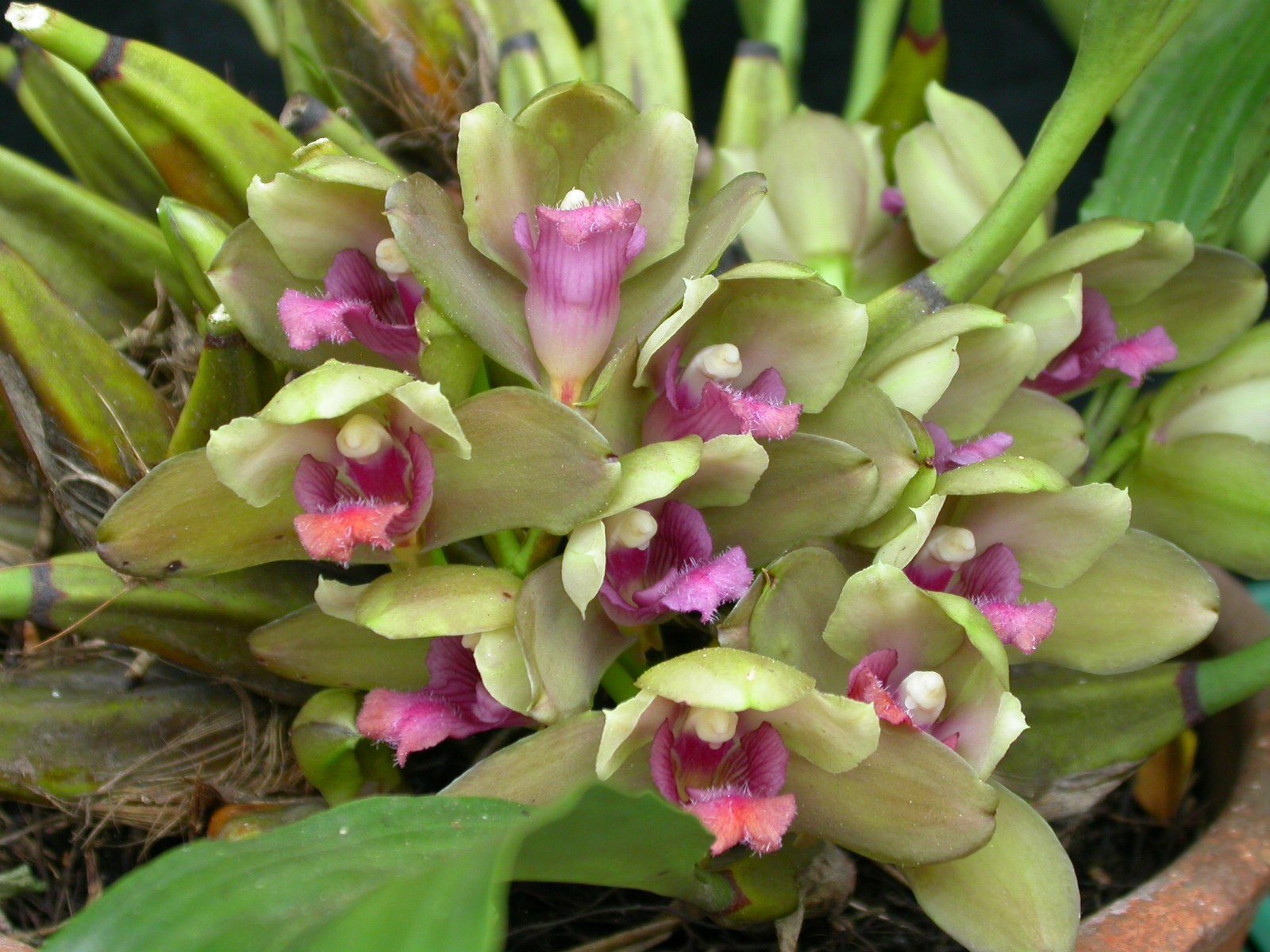

Scientific classification
- Kingdom: Plantae
- Clade: Tracheophytes
- Clade: Angiosperms
- Clade: Monocots
- Order: Asparagales
- Family: Orchidaceae
- Subfamily: Epidendroideae
- Genus: Bifrenaria
- Species: B. inodora

Binomial name
- Bifrenaria inodora Lindl. (1843)

Synonyms
- Bifrenaria fragrans Barb.Rodr. (1882); Bifrenaria fuerstenbergiana Schltr. (1906)

= Bifrenaria inodora =

Species of orchid

Bifrenaria inodora is a species of orchid.
