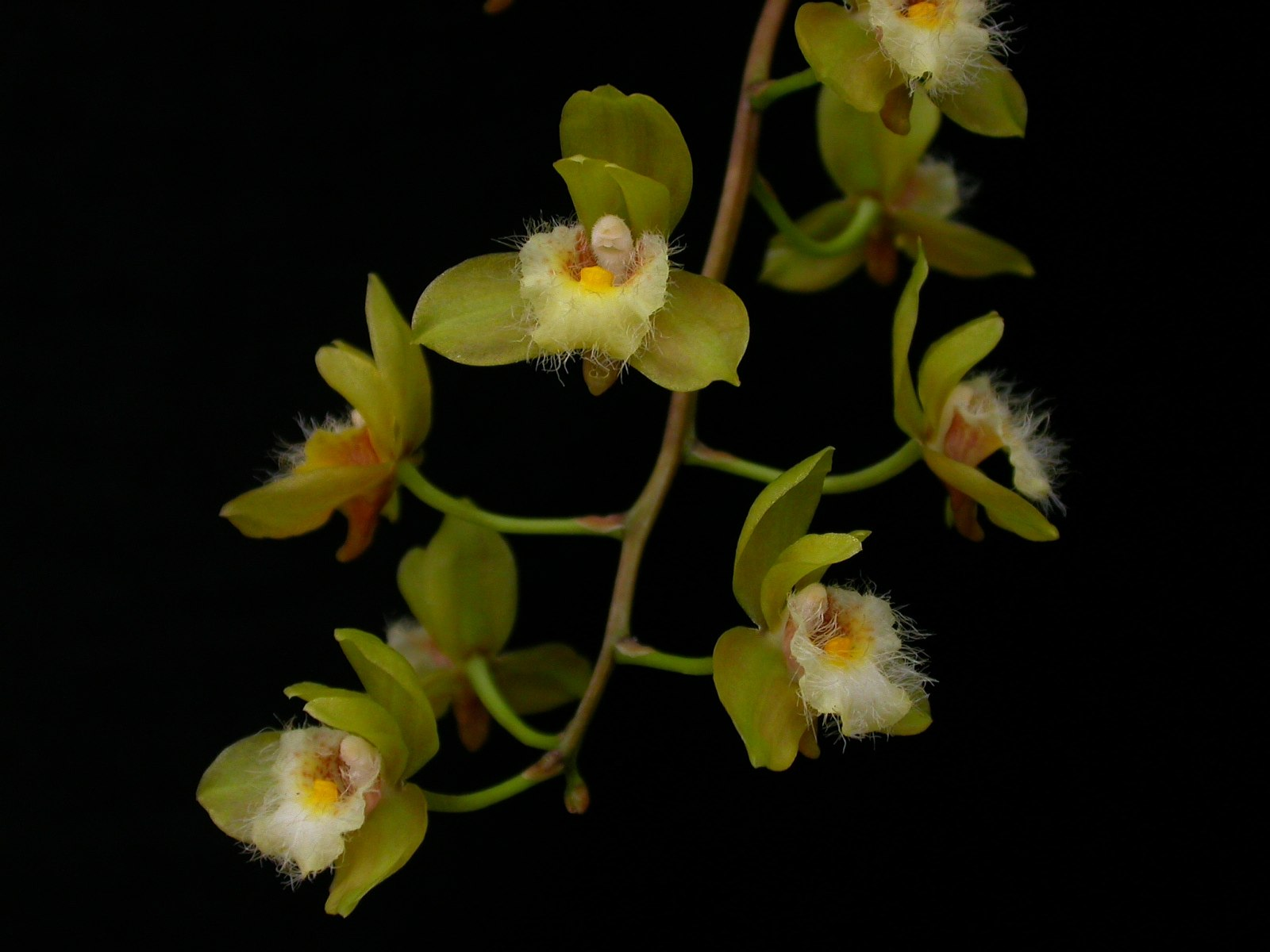

Scientific classification
- Kingdom: Plantae
- Clade: Tracheophytes
- Clade: Angiosperms
- Clade: Monocots
- Order: Asparagales
- Family: Orchidaceae
- Subfamily: Epidendroideae
- Genus: Bifrenaria
- Species: B. charlesworthii

Binomial name
- Bifrenaria charlesworthii Barb.Rodr. (1882)

Synonyms
- Stenocoryne charlesworthii (Rolfe) Hoehne (1944); Bifrenaria villosula Brade (1949); Stenocoryne villosula (Brade) Brade (1950); Adipe charlesworthii (Rolfe) M. Wolff (1990); Adipe villosula (Brade) M. Wolff (1990)

= Bifrenaria charlesworthii =

Species of orchid

Bifrenaria charlesworthii is a species of orchid.
