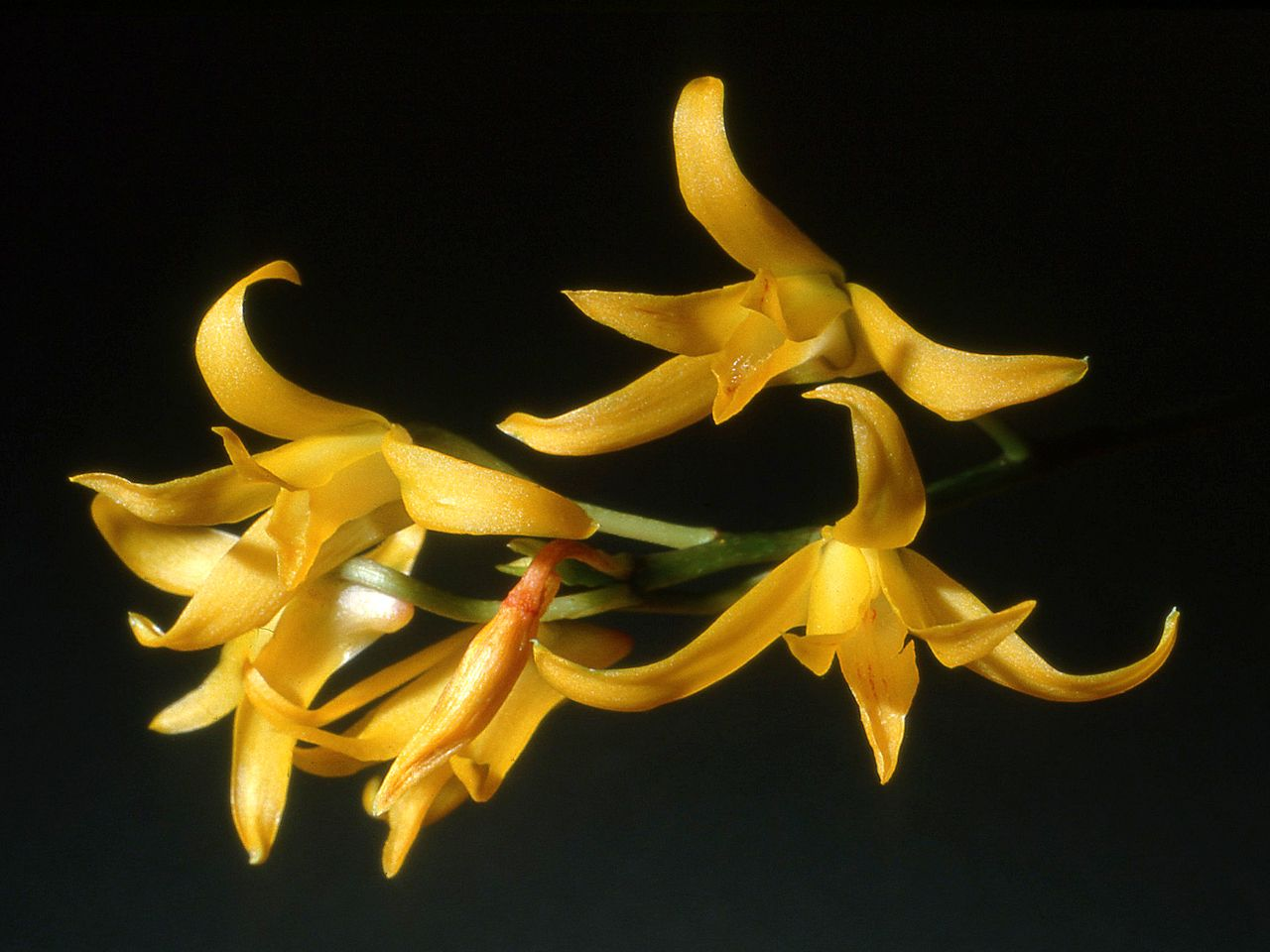

Scientific classification
- Kingdom: Plantae
- Clade: Tracheophytes
- Clade: Angiosperms
- Clade: Monocots
- Order: Asparagales
- Family: Orchidaceae
- Subfamily: Epidendroideae
- Genus: Bifrenaria
- Species: B. aureofulva

Binomial name
- Bifrenaria aureofulva Lindl. (1843)

Synonyms
- Maxillaria aureofulva (Lindl.) Hook. (1838); Maxillaria stenopetala Knowles & Westc. (1838); Stenocoryne secunda Hoehne (1944); Bifrenaria secunda (Hoehne) Pabst (1967); Adipe aureofulva (Lindl.) M. Wolff (1990)

= Bifrenaria aureofulva =

Species of orchid

Bifrenaria aureofulva is a species of orchid.
