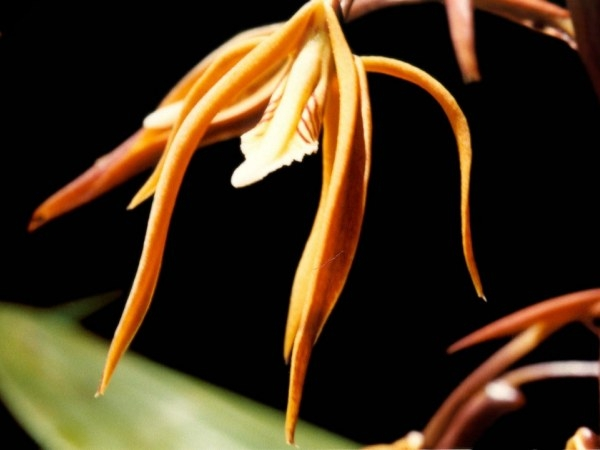

Scientific classification
- Kingdom: Plantae
- Clade: Tracheophytes
- Clade: Angiosperms
- Clade: Monocots
- Order: Asparagales
- Family: Orchidaceae
- Subfamily: Epidendroideae
- Genus: Bifrenaria
- Species: B. steyermarkii

Binomial name
- Bifrenaria steyermarkii V.P. Castro (1991)

Synonyms
- Xylobium steyermarkii (1970) (basionym)

= Bifrenaria steyermarkii =

Species of orchid

Bifrenaria steyermarkii is a species of orchid. A 2004 taxonomic study suggested it could be in a monotypic genus, or part of Xylobium.
