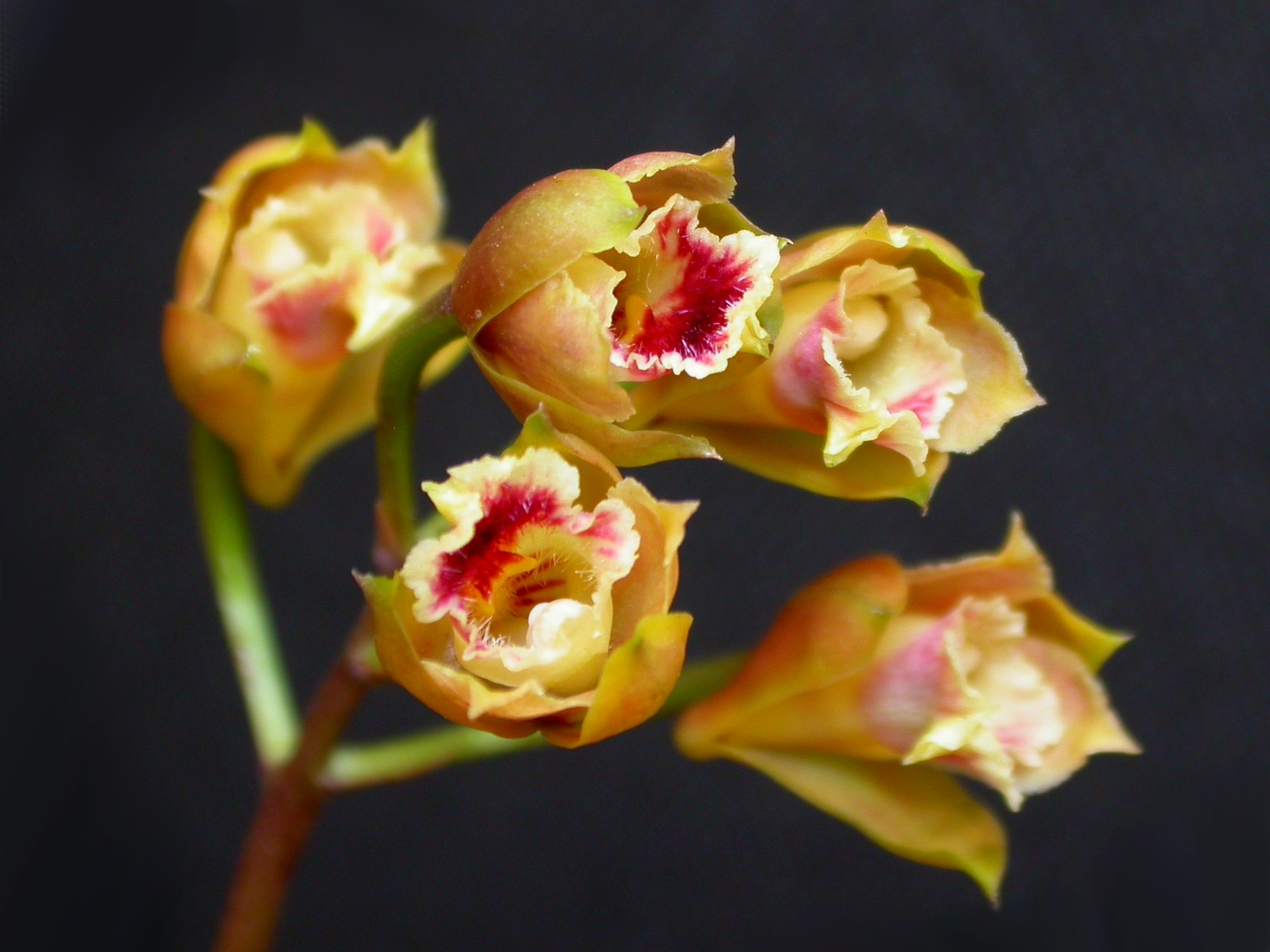

Scientific classification
- Kingdom: Plantae
- Clade: Tracheophytes
- Clade: Angiosperms
- Clade: Monocots
- Order: Asparagales
- Family: Orchidaceae
- Subfamily: Epidendroideae
- Genus: Bifrenaria
- Species: B. stefanae

Binomial name
- Bifrenaria stefanae V.P. Castro (1991)

Synonyms
- Adipe stefanae (V.P. Castro) Senghas (1994)

= Bifrenaria stefanae =

Species of orchid

Bifrenaria stefanae is a species of orchid.
