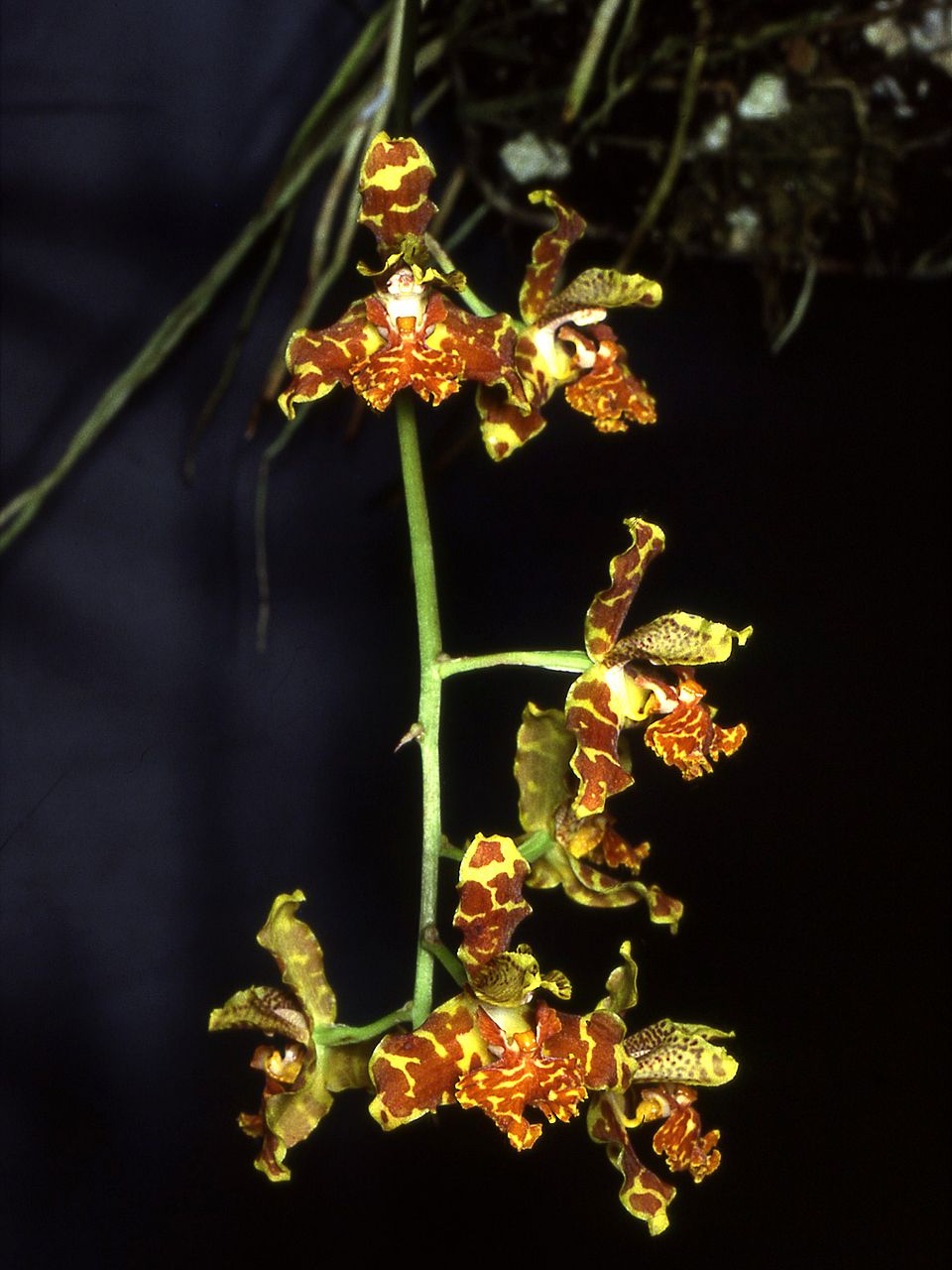
- Flower of Rudolfiella floribunda

Scientific classification
- Kingdom: Plantae
- Clade: Embryophytes
- Clade: Tracheophytes
- Clade: Spermatophytes
- Clade: Angiosperms
- Clade: Monocots
- Order: Asparagales
- Family: Orchidaceae
- Subfamily: Epidendroideae
- Genus: Rudolfiella
- Species: R. floribunda

Binomial name
- Rudolfiella floribunda (Schltr.) Hoehne

Synonyms
- Lindleyella floribunda Schltr. (basionym); Lindleyella saxicola Schltr.; Bifrenaria saxicola (Schltr.) C.Schweinf.; Schlechterella saxicola (Schltr.) Hoehne; Bifrenaria floribunda (Schltr.) C.Schweinf.; Schlechterella floribunda (Schltr.) Hoehne; Rudolfiella saxicola (Schltr.) Hoehne

= Rudolfiella floribunda =

Species of orchid

Rudolfiella floribunda is a species of orchid native to western South America.
