= Guanchezia =

Scientific classification
- Kingdom: Plantae
- Clade: Tracheophytes
- Clade: Angiosperms
- Clade: Monocots
- Order: Asparagales
- Family: Orchidaceae
- Subfamily: Epidendroideae
- Tribe: Cymbidieae
- Subtribe: Maxillariinae
- Genus: Guanchezia; G.A.Romero & Carnevali
- Species: G. maguirei

Binomial name
- Guanchezia maguirei (C.Schweinf.) G.A.Romero & Carnevali

Synonyms
- Bifrenaria maguirei C.Schweinf.

Genus of orchids

Guanchezia is a genus of terrestrial orchids. There is only one known species, Guanchezia maguirei, endemic to Venezuela.
