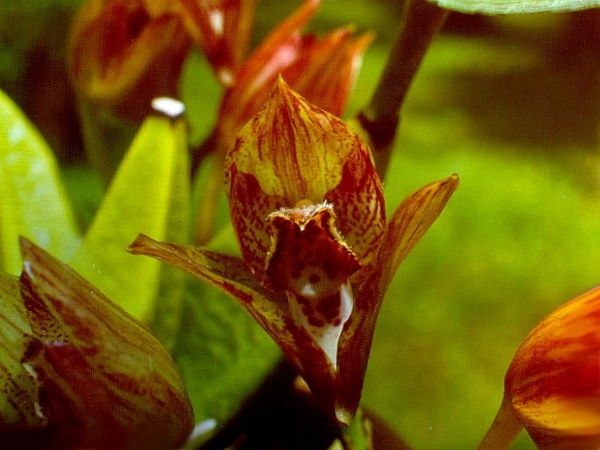

Scientific classification
- Kingdom: Plantae
- Clade: Embryophytes
- Clade: Tracheophytes
- Clade: Angiosperms
- Clade: Monocots
- Order: Asparagales
- Family: Orchidaceae
- Subfamily: Epidendroideae
- Genus: Bifrenaria
- Species: B. wittigii

Binomial name
- Bifrenaria wittigii (Lindl.) Lindl. (1843)

Synonyms
- Lycaste wittigii Rchb.f. (1878) (Basionym); Cydoniorchis wittigii (Rchb.f.) Senghas (1994)

= Bifrenaria wittigii =

Species of orchid

Bifrenaria wittigii is a species of orchid.

== Description ==
Bifrenaria wittigii is a small herbaceous plant that prefers warm to cool climates and grows as an epiphyte. It has a conical, four-angled pseudobulb bearing a single apical, erect, elongated-elliptic, acuminate leaf. It produces an approximately 8 cm long basal inflorescence bearing fragrant flowers. Flowering occurs in spring and summer.
