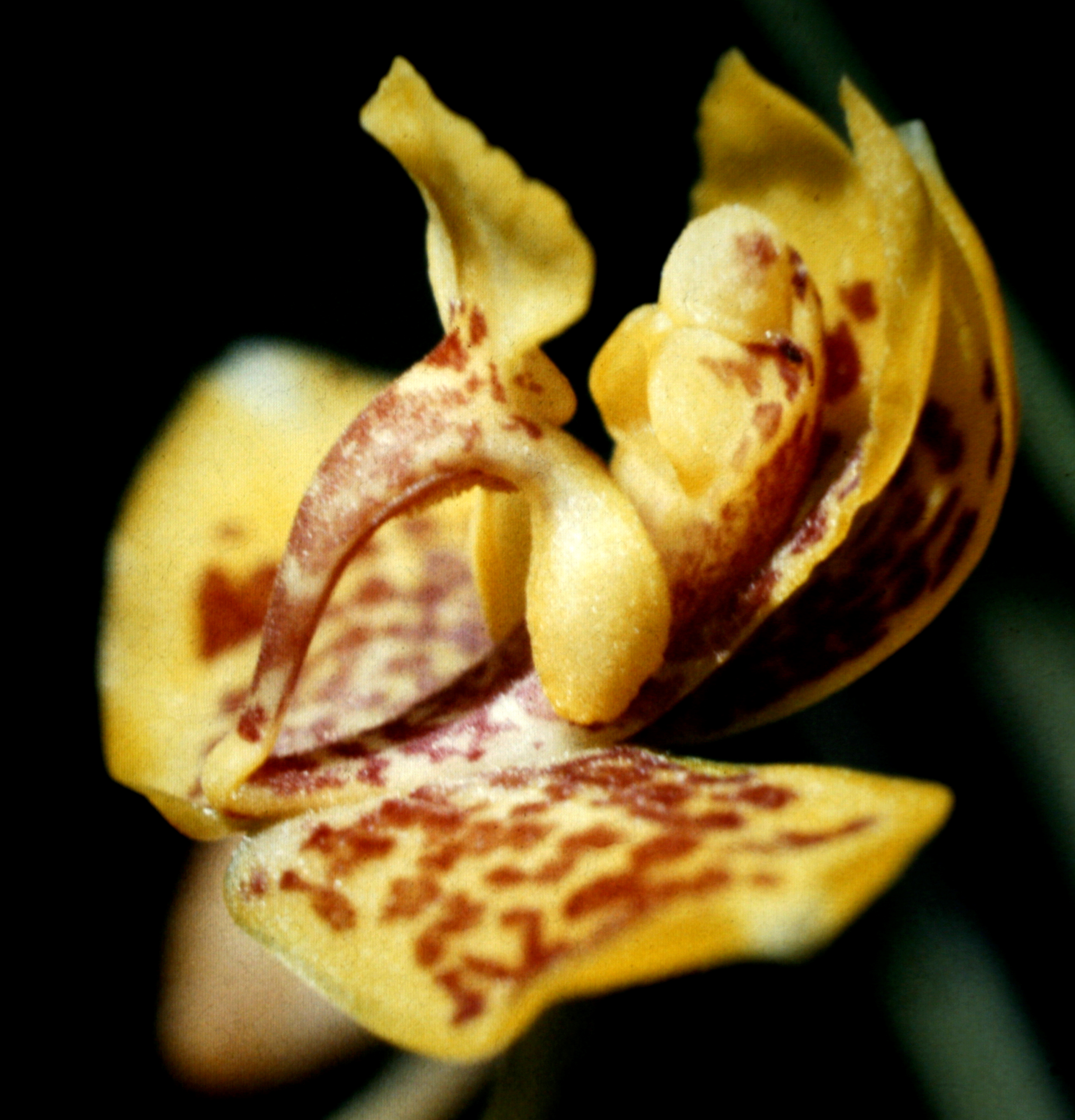
- Rudolfiella aurantiaca

Scientific classification
- Kingdom: Plantae
- Clade: Embryophytes
- Clade: Tracheophytes
- Clade: Spermatophytes
- Clade: Angiosperms
- Clade: Monocots
- Order: Asparagales
- Family: Orchidaceae
- Subfamily: Epidendroideae
- Subtribe: Maxillariinae
- Genus: Rudolfiella; Hoehne

Type species
- Rudolfiella aurantiaca Hoehne

Synonyms
- Lindleyella [Schltr.], illegitimate; Schlechterella Hoehne, illegitimate

= Rudolfiella =

Genus of orchids

Rudolfiella, abbreviated as Rud. in the horticultural trade, is a genus of orchids comprising eight species native to tropical South America, Trinidad and Panama.

They are found in northern Brazil, Colombia, Ecuador, French Guiana, Guyana, Panamá, Peru, Suriname, Trinidad-Tobago and Venezuela.

The genus name of Rudolfiella is in honour of Friedrich Richard Rudolf Schlechter (1872–1925), who was a German taxonomist, botanist, and author of several works on orchids.

== Species ==
- Rudolfiella aurantiaca (Lindl.) Hoehne
- Rudolfiella bicornaria (Rchb.f.) Hoehne
- Rudolfiella caquetaense Uribe Vélez & Sauleda
- Rudolfiella floribunda (Schltr.) Hoehne
- Rudolfiella lindmaniana (Kraenzl.) Hoehne
- Rudolfiella peruviana D.E.Benn. & Christenson
- Rudolfiella picta (Schltr.) Hoehne
