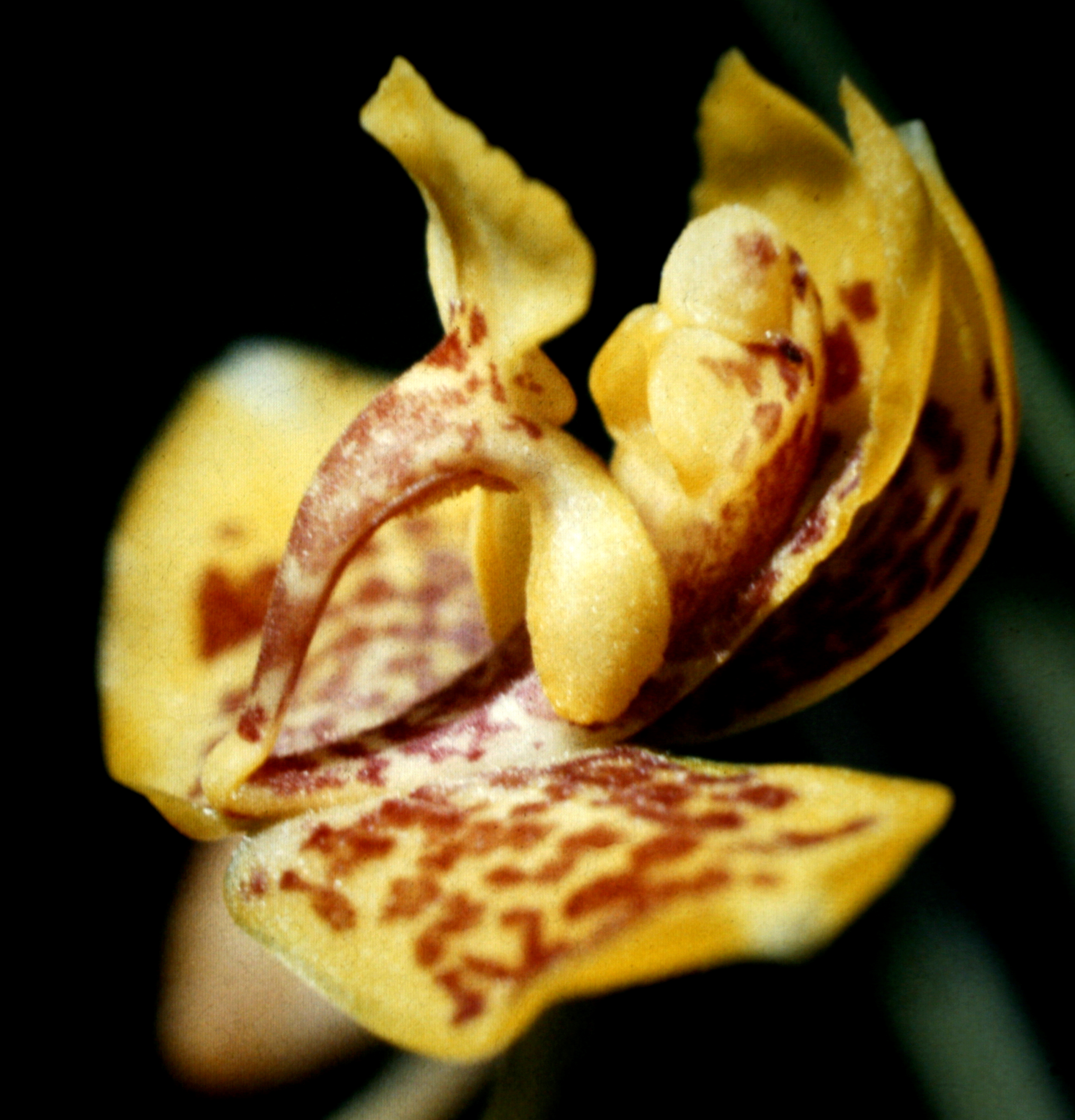
- Flower of Rudolfiella aurantiaca

Scientific classification
- Kingdom: Plantae
- Clade: Embryophytes
- Clade: Tracheophytes
- Clade: Spermatophytes
- Clade: Angiosperms
- Clade: Monocots
- Order: Asparagales
- Family: Orchidaceae
- Subfamily: Epidendroideae
- Genus: Rudolfiella
- Species: R. aurantiaca

Binomial name
- Rudolfiella aurantiaca (Lindl.) Hoehne

Synonyms
- Bifrenaria aurantiaca Lindl. (basionym); Maxillaria aurantiaca (Lindl.) A.Rich. & Galeotti; Lindleyella aurantiaca (Lindl.) Schltr.; Schlechterella aurantiaca (Lindl.) Hoehne

= Rudolfiella aurantiaca =

Species of orchid

Rudolfiella aurantiaca is a species of orchid occurring from Trinidad to tropical South America. It is the type species of the genus Rudolfiella.
