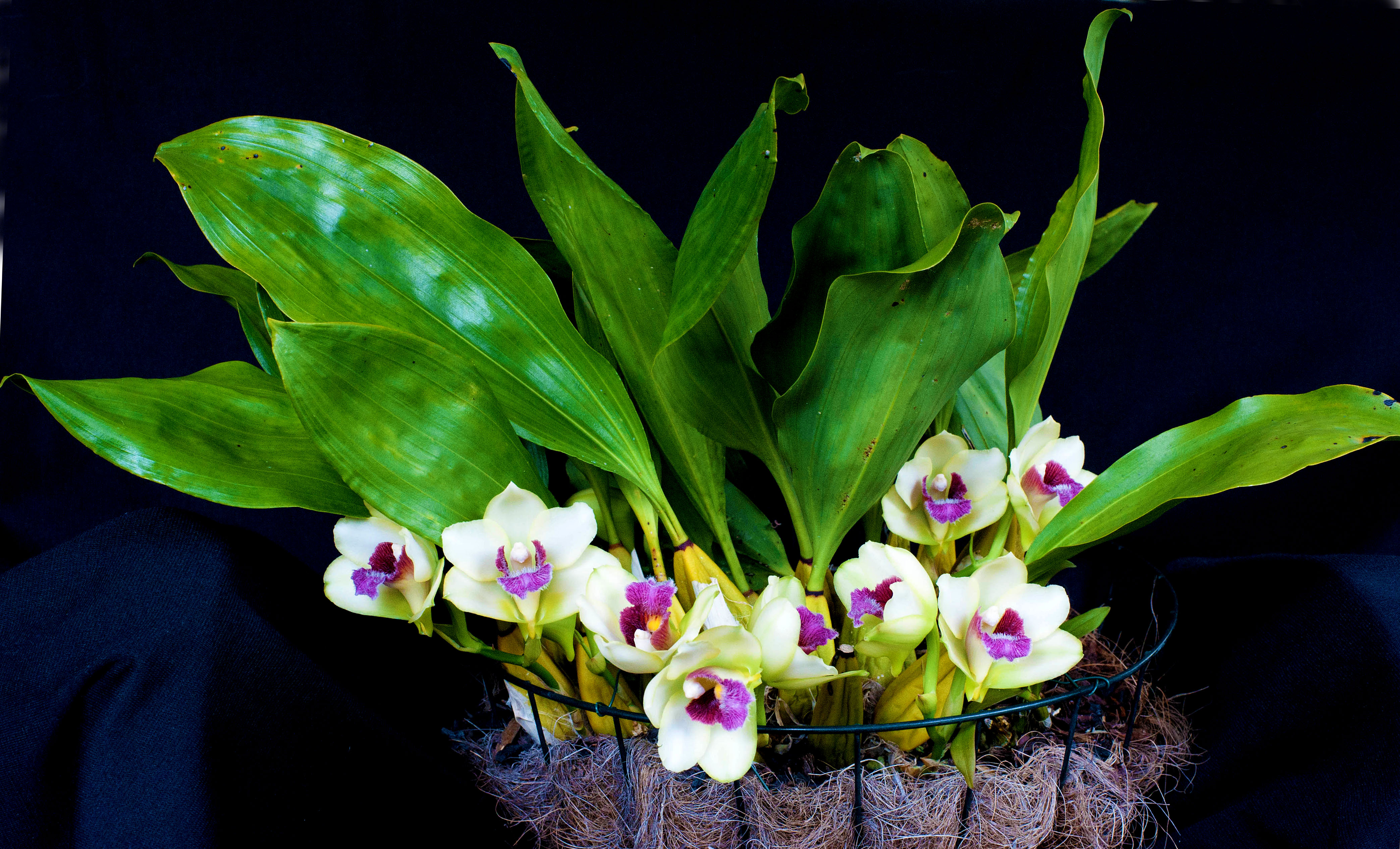

Scientific classification
- Kingdom: Plantae
- Clade: Tracheophytes
- Clade: Angiosperms
- Clade: Monocots
- Order: Asparagales
- Family: Orchidaceae
- Subfamily: Epidendroideae
- Genus: Bifrenaria
- Species: B. harrisoniae

Binomial name
- Bifrenaria harrisoniae (Hook.) Rchb.f. (1855)

Synonyms
- See text

= Bifrenaria harrisoniae =

Species of orchid

Bifrenaria harrisoniae is a species of orchid native to Brazil.

== Synonyms ==
chronological

- Dendrobium harrisoniae Hook. (1824) (Basionym)
- Maxillaria harrisoniae (Hook.) Lindl. (1825)
- Colax harrisoniae (Hook.) Lindl. ex Spreng. (1826)
- Maxillaria spathacea Lindl. (1832)
- Colax grandiflorus Raf. (1837)
- Maxillaria harrisoniae var. alba Lindl. (1841)
- Stanhopea harrisoniae (Hook.) P.N. Don (1845)
- Maxillaria harrisoniae var. grandiflora Paxton (1850)
- Maxillaria harrisoniae var. angustior Lindl. (1853)
- Lycaste harrisoniae (Hook.) G. Don ex Loudon (1855)
- Maxillaria pubigera Klotzsch (1855)
- Maxillaria barringtoniae Rchb.f. (1858)
- Bifrenaria harrisoniae var. pubigera (Klotzsch) Rchb.f. (1879)
- Bifrenaria aurea Barb.Rodr. (1882)
- Lycaste harrisoniae var. eburnea S. Moore (1884)
- Maxillaria harrisoniae var. eburnea S. Moore (1884)
- Lycaste citrina B.S. Williams (1885)
- Bifrenaria harrisoniae var. alba (Lindl.) Kraenzl. (1889)
- Bifrenaria harrisoniae var. citrina (B.S. Williams) Stein (1892)
- Bifrenaria harrisoniae var. eburnea (S. Moore) Beer mug (1892)
- Bifrenaria harrisoniae var. purpurascens H.J. Veitch (1893)
- Bifrenaria harrisoniae var. buchananiana Rchb.f. (1897)
- Bifrenaria harrisoniae var. angustior (Lindl.) Cogn. (1902)
- Bifrenaria harrisoniae var. grandiflora (Paxton) Cogn. (1902)
- Bifrenaria harrisoniae var. glabra W. Zimm. (1934)
- Bifrenaria harrisoniae var. flavopurpurea Hoehne (1950)
- Bifrenaria harrisoniae var. insularis Hoehne (1950)
- Bifrenaria harrisoniae var. minor Hoehne (1950)
- Bifrenaria harrisoniae var. typica Hoehne (1950)
- Bifrenaria tyrianthina var. albescens Hoehne (1950)
- Bifrenaria harrisoniae var. alba-plena Pabst (1978)

alphabetical

- Bifrenaria aurea Barb.Rodr. (1882)
- Bifrenaria harrisoniae var. alba-plena Pabst (1978)
- Bifrenaria harrisoniae var. alba (Lindl.) Kraenzl. (1889)
- Bifrenaria harrisoniae var. angustior (Lindl.) Cogn. (1902)
- Bifrenaria harrisoniae var. buchananiana Rchb.f. (1897)
- Bifrenaria harrisoniae var. citrina (B.S. Williams) Stein (1892)
- Bifrenaria harrisoniae var. eburnea (S. Moore) Beer mug (1892)
- Bifrenaria harrisoniae var. flavopurpurea Hoehne (1950)
- Bifrenaria harrisoniae var. glabra W. Zimm. (1934)
- Bifrenaria harrisoniae var. grandiflora (Paxton) Cogn. (1902)
- Bifrenaria harrisoniae var. insularis Hoehne (1950)
- Bifrenaria harrisoniae var. insignificant Hoehne (1950)
- Bifrenaria harrisoniae var. pubigera (Klotzsch) Rchb.f. (1879)
- Bifrenaria harrisoniae var. purpurascens H.J. Veitch (1893)
- Bifrenaria harrisoniae var. typica Hoehne (1950)
- Bifrenaria tyrianthina var. albescens Hoehne (1950)
- Colax grandiflorus Raf. (1837)
- Colax harrisoniae (Hook.) Lindl. ex Spreng. (1826)
- Dendrobium harrisoniae Hook. (1824) (Basionym)
- Lycaste citrina B.S. Williams (1885)
- Lycaste harrisoniae (Hook.) G. Don ex Loudon (1855)
- Lycaste harrisoniae var. eburnea S. Moore (1884)
- Maxillaria barringtoniae Rchb.f. (1858)
- Maxillaria harrisoniae (Hook.) Lindl. (1825)
- Maxillaria harrisoniae var. alba Lindl. (1841)
- Maxillaria harrisoniae var. angustior Lindl. (1853)
- Maxillaria harrisoniae var. eburnea S. Moore (1884)
- Maxillaria harrisoniae var. grandiflora Paxton (1850)
- Maxillaria pubigera Klotzsch (1855)
- Maxillaria spathacea Lindl. (1832)
- Stanhopea (Hook.) P.N. Don (1845)
