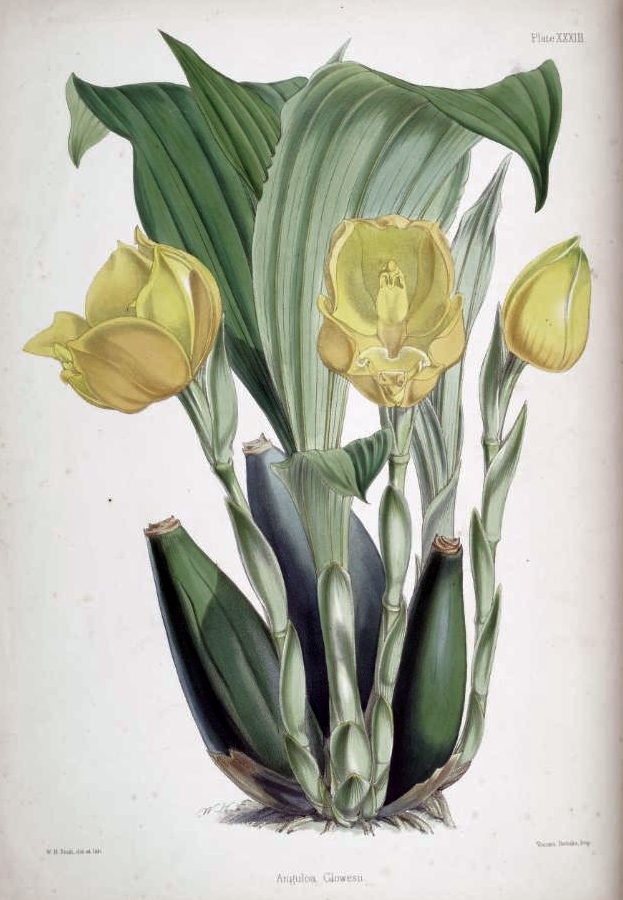
- Anguloa clowesii

Scientific classification
- Kingdom: Plantae
- Clade: Tracheophytes
- Clade: Angiosperms
- Clade: Monocots
- Order: Asparagales
- Family: Orchidaceae
- Subfamily: Epidendroideae
- Tribe: Cymbidieae
- Subtribe: Maxillariinae
- Genus: Anguloa; Ruíz & Pav.

Type species
- Anguloa uniflora Ruíz & Pav.

Species
- See text

= Anguloa =

Species of plant

Anguloa, commonly known as tulip orchids, is a small orchid genus closely related to Lycaste. Its abbreviation in horticulture is Ang. This genus was described by José Antonio Pavón and Hipólito Ruiz López in 1798. They named it in honor of Francisco de Angulo, Director-General of Mines of Spain.

This genus is found on the forest floor at high elevations from Venezuela, Colombia, Ecuador, Bolivia and Peru. Anguloa is closely related to Lycaste and Ida, and can hybridize with Lycaste.

== Description ==
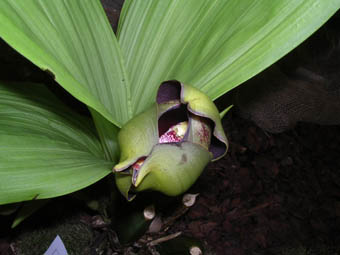
A horticultural hybrid Anguloa with green flowers

Tulip orchids are rather large terrestrial and sometimes epiphytic plants with fleshy pseudobulbs longer than 20 cm. The long, lanceolate and plicate leaves of a full-grown Anguloa can be more than 1 m long. Two to four leaves grow from the base of each pseudobulb. The leaves are deciduous, and are shed at the start of each new growth.

The flowers of these orchids have a strong scent of cinnamon. They are of waxy appearance and are (in wild species) either of two colors, depending on the species – greenish white, or yellow to red. A single flower per inflorescence arises from the base of each new pseudobulb. The white tulip orchids have six inflorescences per pseudobulb, the other can produce up to twelve inflorescences. The sepals have a bulbous shape, resembling a tulip; hence the common name. The lip is three-lobed. The column has four pollinia.

=== Pollination ===
When touched, the lip of the flower rocks back and forth inside the cup-shaped flower as if the lip was a child in a cradle. As a result, it is sometimes known as a cradle orchid. Similarly, it has been known in Columbia as cuna de Venus (cradle of Venus). When an orchid bee pollinator lands on the opening of the flower, its weight tips the flower forwards, and the lip moves down to allow the bee inside the flower. Having moved into the flower, the change in the centre of gravity tips the flower back, flipping the lip upwards, pressing the bee against the rostellum and sticky pollinia. On a return visit, the same maneuver presses the pollinia into the flower's stigma.

== Species ==
The genus is split into two sections. Section Guoloanga includes the yellow and red anguloas such as A. clowesii, A. hohenlohii, A. brevilabris, A. dubia, while section Euanguloa includes the white anguloas such as A. uniflora, A. eburnea, A. virginalis, and A. tognettiae.

There are 13 species of tulip orchids, including 4 apparently of hybrid origin though established in the wild. Other hybrid tulip orchids are bred by horticulturalists, but do not occur in the wild. The following are currently accepted as of May 2014:

Image	Name	Described by	Distribution
	Anguloa × acostae (A. eburnea × A. hohenlohii)	Oakeley	Colombia
	Anguloa brevilabris	Rolfe	Colombia, Peru
	Anguloa cliftonii	J.G.Fowler	Colombia
	Anguloa cliftonii var. alba	Oakeley	Colombia
	Anguloa cliftonii var. concolor	Oakeley	Colombia
	Anguloa clowesii	Lindl.	Venezuela and Colombia
	Anguloa clowesii var. flava	A.DC	Venezuela and Colombia
	Anguloa dubia	Rchb.f.	Colombia and possibly Venezuela
	Anguloa eburnea	Linden ex B.S.Williams	Colombia, Peru, Ecuador
	Anguloa hohenlohii	C.Morren	Venezuela and Colombia
	Anguloa hohenlohii var. macroglossa	(Schltr.) Oakeley	Colombia
	Anguloa × rolfei (A. brevilabris × A. cliftonii)	Sander ex Rolfe	Colombia
	Anguloa × ruckeri (A. clowesii × A. hohenlohii)	Lindl.	Colombia, Venezuela, Peru
	Anguloa × speciosa (A. tognettiae × A. virginalis)	Linden	Venezuela, Colombia
	Anguloa tognettiae	Oakeley	Venezuela and Colombia
	Anguloa uniflora	Ruiz & Pav.	Peru
	Anguloa virginalis	Linden ex B.S.Williams	Venezuela, Colombia, Ecuador, Peru, Bolivia
	Anguloa virginalis var. turneri	(B.S.Williams) Oakeley	Colombia
