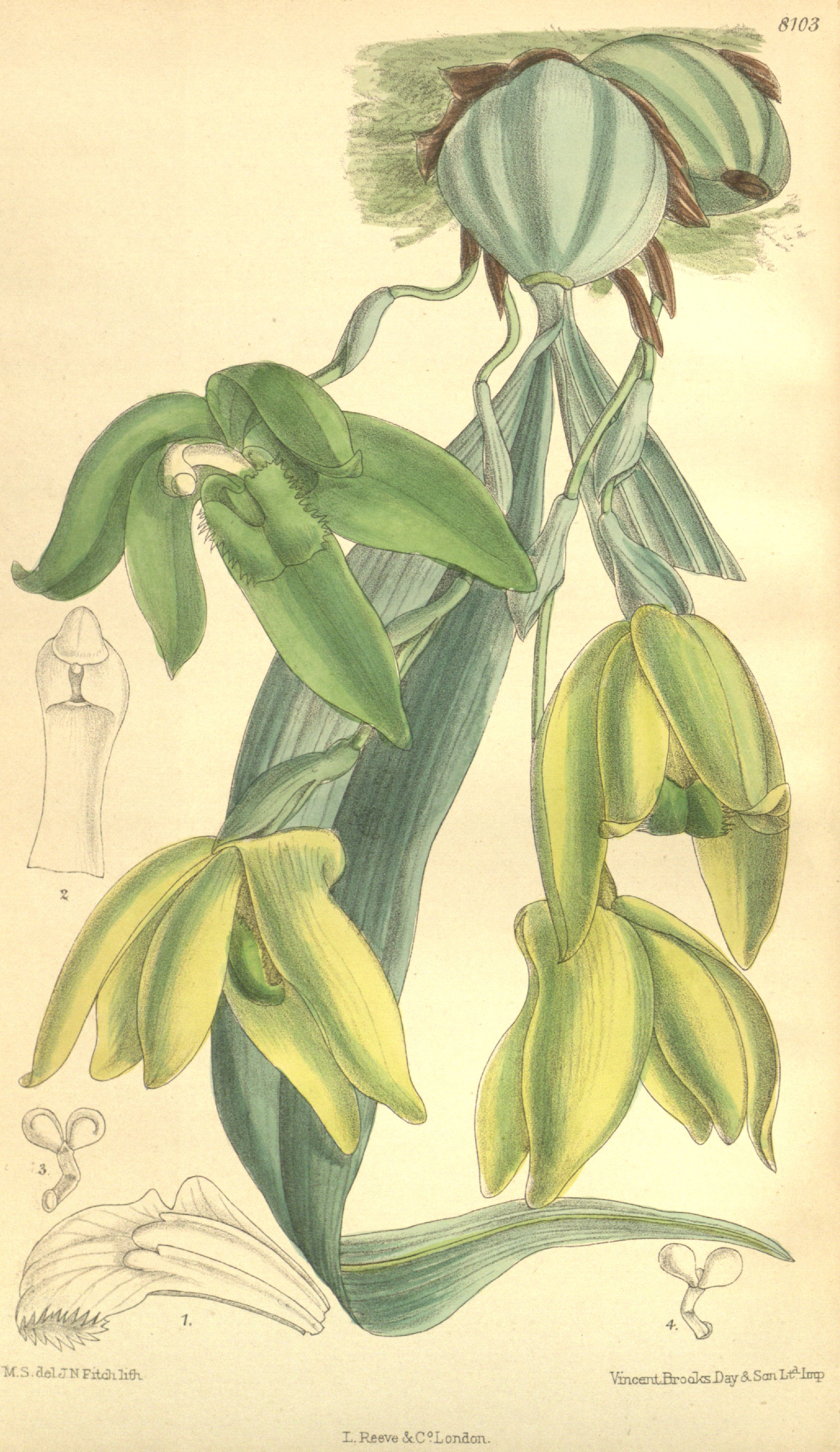

Scientific classification
- Kingdom: Plantae
- Clade: Tracheophytes
- Clade: Angiosperms
- Clade: Monocots
- Order: Asparagales
- Family: Orchidaceae
- Subfamily: Epidendroideae
- Genus: Ida
- Species: I. dyeriana

Binomial name
- Ida dyeriana (Sander ex Mast.) Oakeley

Synonyms
- Lycaste dyeriana Sander ex Mast.; Sudamerlycaste dyeriana (Sander ex Mast.) Archila

= Ida dyeriana =

Species of orchid

Ida dyeriana, synonym Sudamerlycaste dyeriana, is an orchid endemic to Peru and Ecuador. It is one of the very few insect-pollinated flowers (and the only orchid) which is entirely green in color. Other Ida species, such as Ida locusta, are mostly green, but have white markings.
