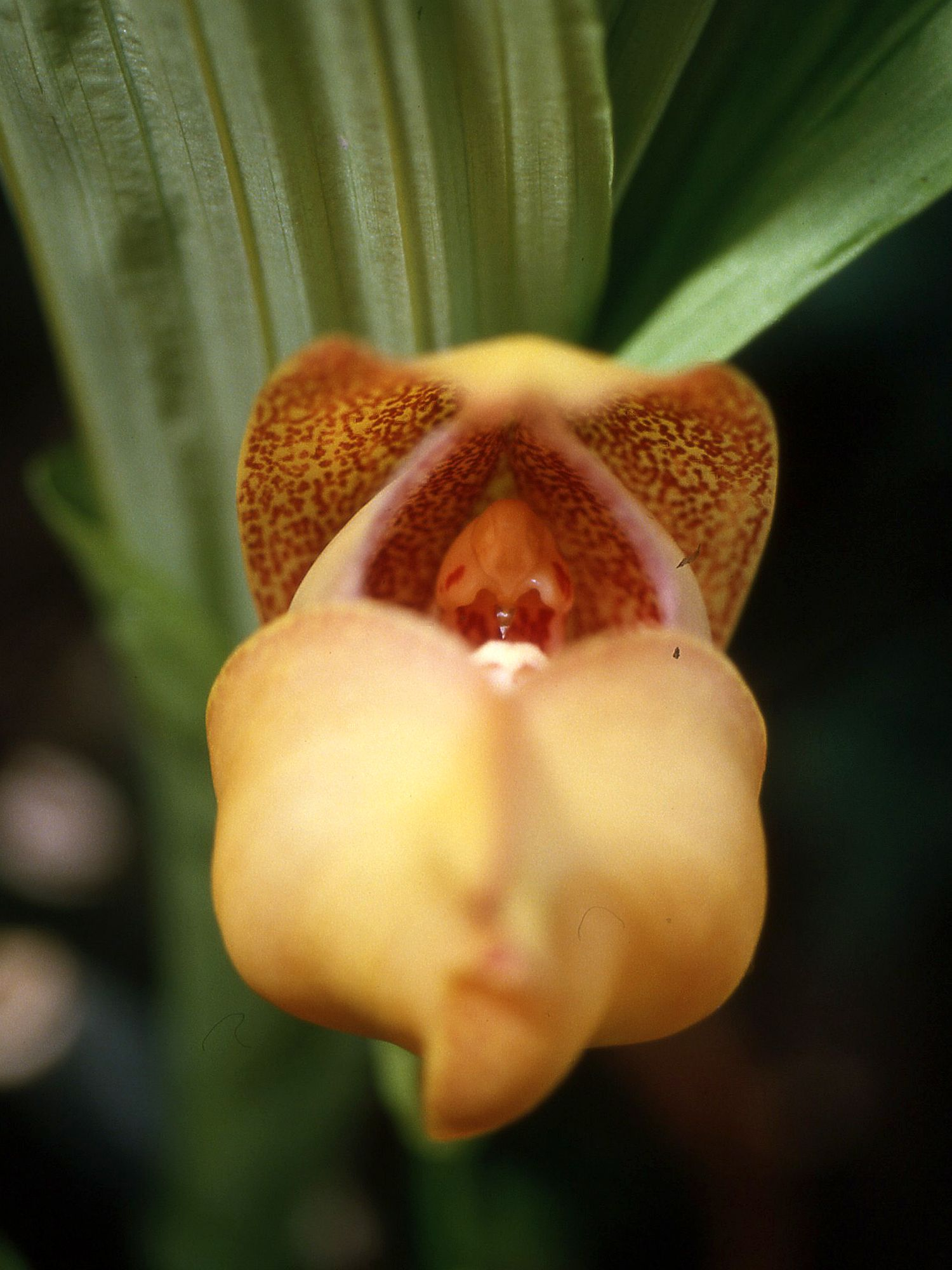

Scientific classification
- Kingdom: Plantae
- Clade: Tracheophytes
- Clade: Angiosperms
- Clade: Monocots
- Order: Asparagales
- Family: Orchidaceae
- Subfamily: Epidendroideae
- Genus: Anguloa
- Species: A. × ruckeri

Binomial name
- Anguloa × ruckeri Lindl.

Synonyms
- Anguloa clowesii var. ruckeri (Lindl.) Foldats; Anguloa clowesii var. macrantha F.Buyss.; Anguloa × macrantha Linden; Anguloa × media Rchb.f.; Anguloa × ruckeri var. media Rchb.f.; Anguloa × ruckeri var. wageneri Regel; Anguloa × sanguinea Kikkert

= Anguloa × ruckeri =

Hybrid species of plant

Anguloa × ruckeri is an orchid in the subfamily Epidendroideae that occurs from northeast Colombia to northwest Venezuela and northern Peru. It is considered to be a natural hybrid between Anguloa clowesii and Anguloa hohenlohii.

The species is considered to have the smallest seeds of any flowering plant, with a weight of ~0.4 μg.
