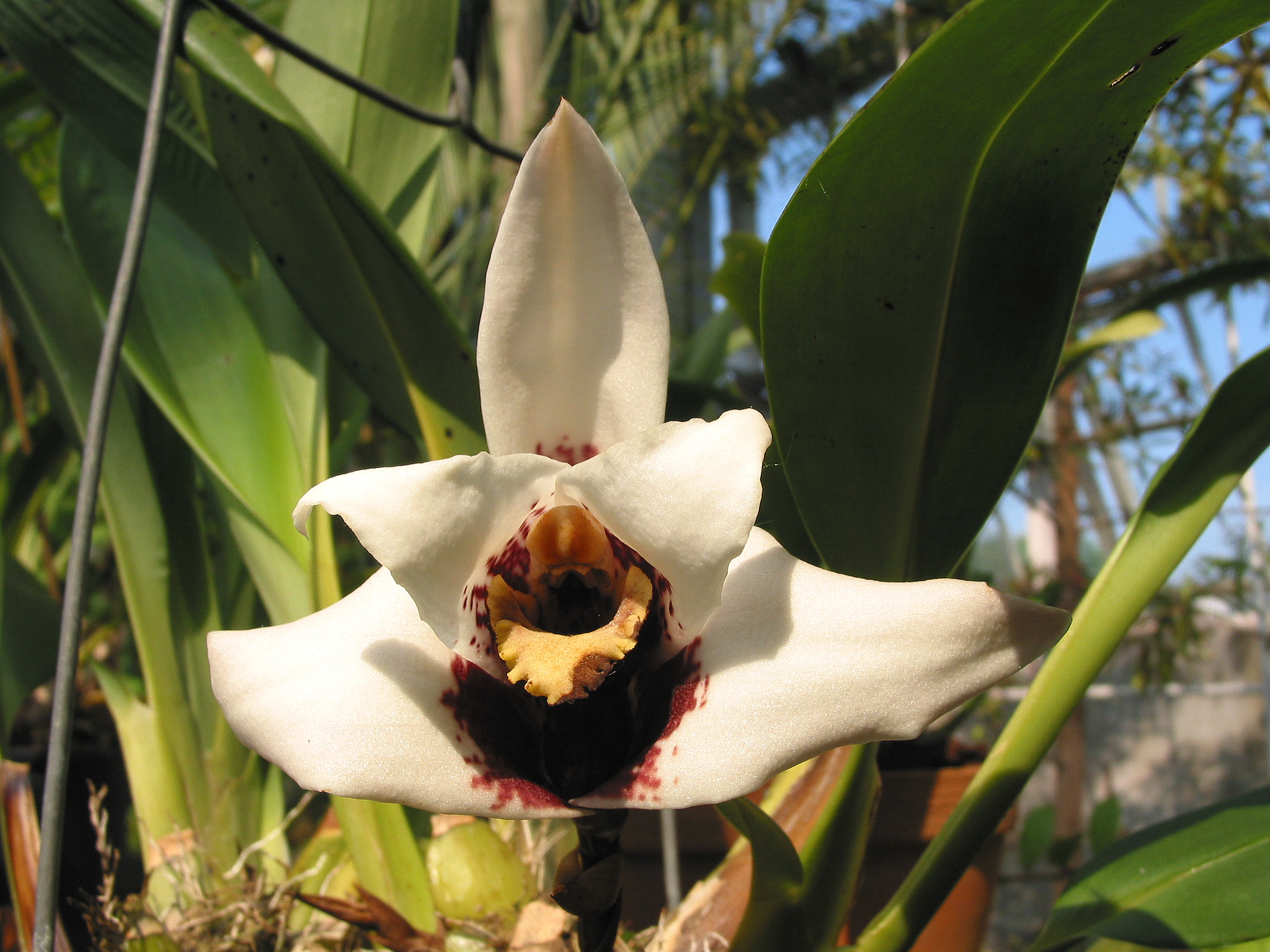
- Maxillaria sanderiana

Scientific classification
- Kingdom: Plantae
- Clade: Tracheophytes
- Clade: Angiosperms
- Clade: Monocots
- Order: Asparagales
- Family: Orchidaceae
- Subfamily: Epidendroideae
- Tribe: Cymbidieae
- Subtribe: Maxillariinae; Benth.

Type genus
- Maxillaria

Genera
- See text.

= Maxillariinae =

Subtribe of orchids

Maxillariinae is an orchid subtribe in the tribe Cymbidieae. It was formerly treated as the tribe Maxillarieae, and divided into a number of subtribes.

== Genera ==
Generic boundaries in the tribe have changed substantially with new molecular evidence. Whitten et al. in 2007 included the following genera, some previously placed in the tribe Lycastinae, others in the subtribe Bifrenariinae. Some of these genera have subsequently been merged.

- Anguloa Ruiz & Pav.
- Anthosiphon Schltr. – since included in Maxillaria
- Bifrenaria Lindl. (including Adipe Raf., Cydoniorchis Senghas, and Stenocoryne Lindl.)
- Brasiliorchis R.Singer, S.Koehler & Carnevali
- Chrysocycnis Linden & Rchb.f. – since included in Maxillaria
- Cryptocentrum Benth.
- Cyrtidiorchis Rauschert
- Guanchezia G.A.Romero & Carnevali
- Horvatia Garay
- Hylaeorchis Carnevali & G.A. Romero
- Ida A.Ryan & Oakeley – since included in Sudamerlycaste
- Lycaste Lindl.
- Maxillaria Ruiz & Pavón
- Mormolyca Fenzl
- Neomoorea Rolfe
- Pityphyllum Schltr.
- Rudolfiella Hoehne
- Scuticaria Lindl.
- Sudamerlycaste Archila
- Teuscheria Garay
- Trigonidium Lindl.
- Xylobium Lindl.

== See also ==
- Taxonomy of the Orchidaceae

== Bibliography ==
- Whitten, W. Mark; Williams, Norris H.; Dressler, Robert L.; Gerlach, Günter & Pupulin, Franco (2005). "Generic relationships of Zygopetalinae (Orchidaceae, Cymbidieae): Combined molecular evidence" (PDF). Lankesteriana International Journal on Orchidology. 5 (2): 87–107.
