= Trigonidium =

Trigonidium may refer to:

- Trigonidium (cricket), a genus of insects in the family Gryllidae
- Trigonidium (plant), a genus of plants in the family Orchidaceae
