= L. aromatica =

L. aromatica may refer to:

- Limnophila aromatica, a plant species
- Lycaste aromatica, a plant species

== See also ==
- Aromatica
