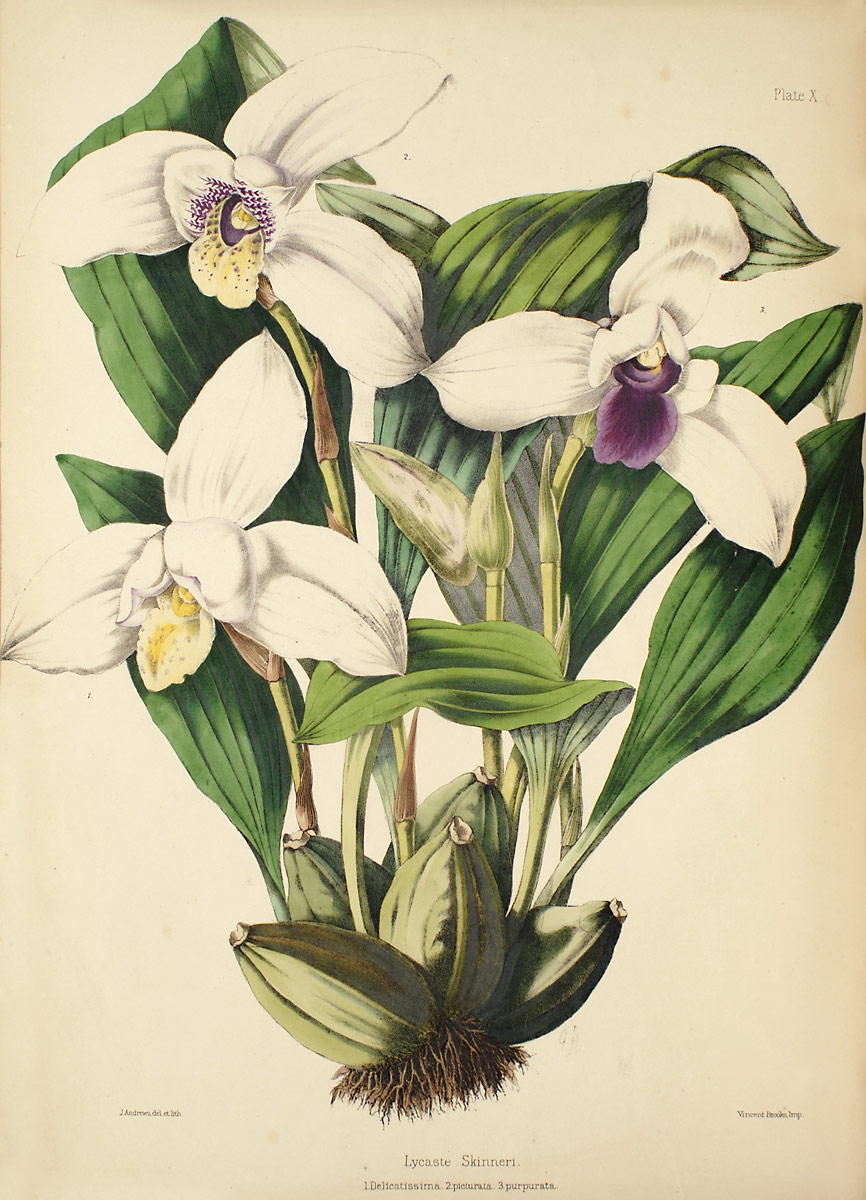
- Illustration of Lycaste skinneri by Walter Hood Fitch

Scientific classification
- Kingdom: Plantae
- Clade: Tracheophytes
- Clade: Angiosperms
- Clade: Monocots
- Order: Asparagales
- Family: Orchidaceae
- Subfamily: Epidendroideae
- Genus: Lycaste
- Species: L. skinneri

Binomial name
- Lycaste skinneri Lindl.

Synonyms
- Maxillaria skinneri Bateman ex Lindl. (basionym); Maxillaria skinneri Lindl.; Maxillaria virginalis Scheidw.; Lycaste skinneri var. alba Dombrain; Lycaste skinneri var. reginae B.S. Williams; Lycaste virginalis (Scheidw.) Linden; Lycaste jamesiana auct.; Lycaste schoenbrunnensis Umlauft; Lycaste alba (Dombrain) Cockerell; Lycaste skinneri f. virginalis (Scheidw.) Christenson

= Lycaste skinneri =

Species of orchid

Lycaste skinneri, also known as Lycaste virginalis, is a species of epiphyte orchid that resides in the south of Mexico, Guatemala, El Salvador and Honduras, at an average altitude of 1650 meters above sea level.

== Description ==
Long leaves grow from its thick pseudobulbs. The flowers of this species -generally individual- are triangular and grow from the base of the youngest pseudo-bulb and measure between 10 and 15 centimeters. They can vary from being completely white in the Alba variety, passing from different tones of pink to lavender. This purity in color makes them the best candidate as a starting point for Lycaste hybrid formation. The flower's blooming period is between November and April, with its peak being in the end of January and the beginning of February. A mature plant can produce between 4 and 12 flowers during its blooming lasting between 6 and 8 weeks.

It is a hermaphrodite plant capable of producing millions of seeds inside of fruit in the form of a capsule. Nevertheless, the necessary conditions for germination include the presence of a specific fungus, which results in the plant being very scarce whose commercialization is prohibited in Guatemala.

== Habitat ==
Lycaste skinneri is found in humid forests of Mexico, Guatemala, El Salvador, and Honduras, being the most abundant and indigenous in Guatemala. It resides at an average altitude of 1,650 meters above sea level, where it doesn't suffer from the high temperatures during the summer or the low temperatures during the winter. Abundant cloud cover at ground level, elevates the relative humidity during the day and the dry season. It inhabits the branches of woody trees at heights where the lighting conditions are appropriate. It is very sensitive to changes in temperature which range from 27 °C to 18 °C at night and the ideal humidity for its development is between 50 and 70 percent.

== Guatemala's patriotic symbol ==
This orchid, also known as the monja blanca (white nun), is the national flower of the Republic of Guatemala. This flower was revered and known by the Mayas and now is known as Sak Ijixby the q'eqchi'.

In 1933, Leticia M. de Southerland, president of the International Exhibition of Flowers, celebrated in Miami Beach, Florida, sent a suggestion to the government of Guatemala that the specimen known as the Lycaste skinneri alba be designated as the national flower. This suggestion was consulted by the president of the Republic, General Jorge Ubico, with various specialists, among them was Ulises Rojas and Mariano Pacheco H. and entities like the National Library and the Society of Geography and History. The Experts took into account the beauty and the rarity of the flower and agreed with the suggestion, so that on the February 11th, 1934, the presidency of the Republic issued a decree giving the monja blanca, the denomination of national flower.

On August 9, 1946, during the governance Juan Jose Arevalo, with the purpose of protecting the species from extinction in Guatemala, a government decree was issued that prohibited the collection and export of the species. The same agreement was modified on June 4, 1947 to extend the ban on pseudobulbs and flowers, as well as to include the rest of the species of this botanical family. In 1997, when they began to make 50 cent coins, the monja blanca was used as one of the faces on the new coin.

== Evolution, phylogeny and taxonomy ==
It was first introduced by George Ure Skinner in Guatemala, where the alba variety is commonly known as the monja blanca and is the national flower of said country.
