= Lycaste cruenta =

Scientific classification
- Kingdom: Plantae
- Clade: Tracheophytes
- Clade: Angiosperms
- Clade: Monocots
- Order: Asparagales
- Family: Orchidaceae
- Subfamily: Epidendroideae
- Genus: Lycaste
- Species: L. cruenta

Binomial name
- Lycaste cruenta (Lindl.) Lindl.

Synonyms
- Maxillaria cruenta Lindl. (basionym); Lycaste balsamea A.Rich.; Maxillaria balsamea (A.Rich.) Beer; Lycaste sulphurea Rchb. f.; Lycaste rossiana Rolfe

Species of orchid

Lycaste cruenta is a plant belonging to the orchid genus Lycaste and native to Central America.

Lycaste cruenta has greenish yellow flowers with bright orange petals and labellum about 8 cm (3 in) wide. They appear in spring in the flower stems up to 15 cm (6 in) high, and there can be more than 20 flowers in one plant. They have a sweet scent resembling cinnamon in the evening. The leaves grow to 38 cm (15 in) long and 15 cm (6 in) wide and are shed before flowering. Lycaste cruenta has pseudobulbs up to 10 cm (4 in) long and 5 cm (2 in) wide.

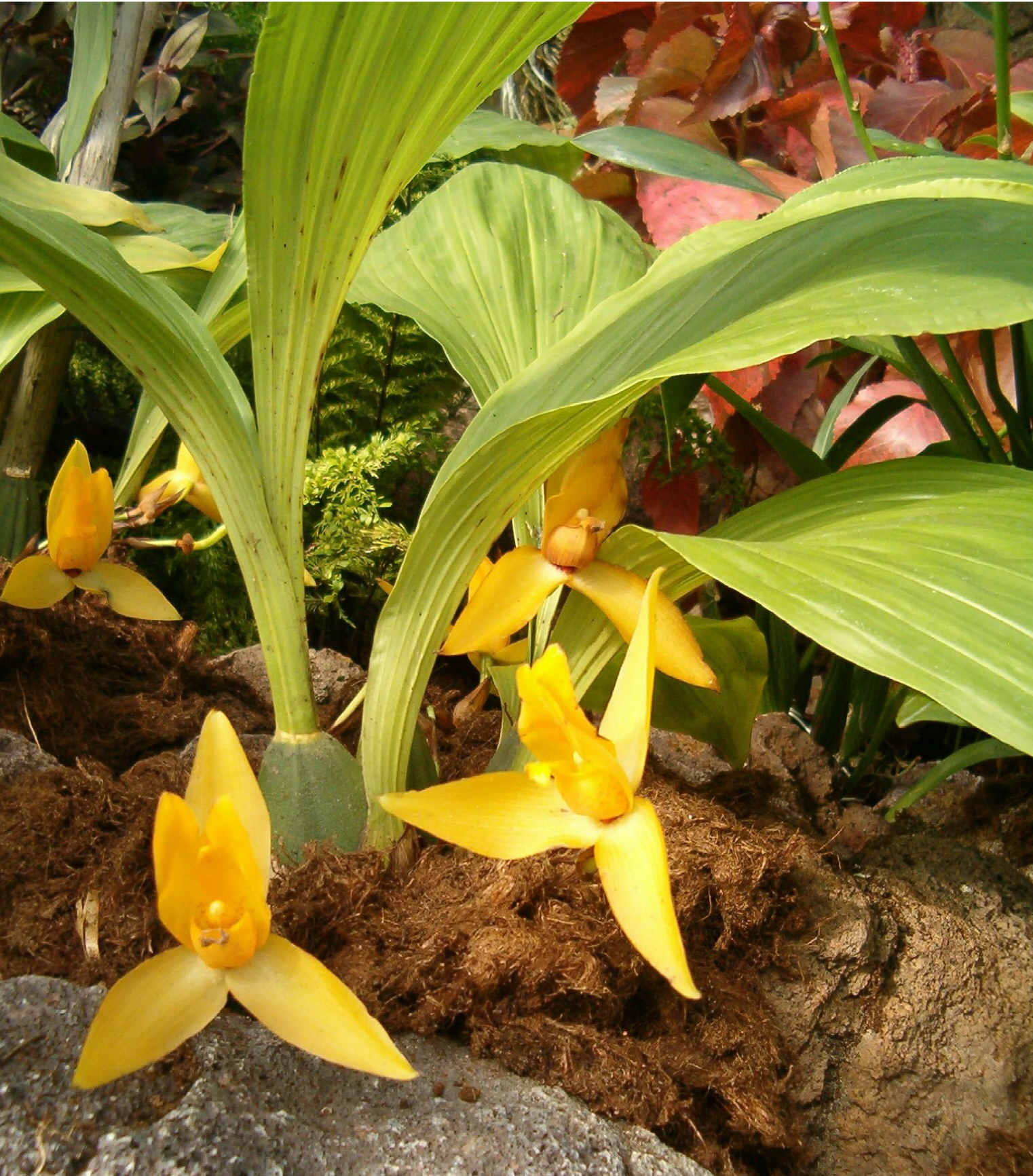
Lycaste cruenta
