= Trigonidium (plant) =

Genus of orchids

Trigonidium, abbreviated as Trgdm in horticultural trade, was a formerly accepted genus of orchids comprising roughly twenty species found from Mexico to Brazil. As of 2023, it was considered a synonym of Maxillaria.

== Etymology ==
Trigonidium derives from the Greek "trigonon", meaning "triangle", in reference to the triangular shape of the flowers.

== Description ==
The epiphytes and lithophytes formerly placed in the genus have long or short rhizomes. Its pseudobulbs are cylindrical or ovoid with overlapping sheathes at their base and one or two leaves at their apex. The inflorescences of the genus are basal, erect, and single flowered, with the flower usually as long or longer than the leaves. The flowers are tubular at the base with sepals spreading. The sepals are larger than the petals and the petals are larger than the lip. The lip is trilobed and not spurred.

The flowers have shiny pads and eyespots that lure male bees to perform pseudocopulation with the blossoms.

== Former species ==
Former species include:

- Trigonidium acuminatum = Maxillaria subrepens
- Trigonidium amparoanum = Maxillaria luisae
- Trigonidium callistele = Maxillaria egertoniana
- Trigonidium christensonii = Maxillaria deherae
- Trigonidium egertonianum = Maxillaria egertoniana
- Trigonidium equitans = Maxillaria chartacifolia
- Trigonidium grande = Maxillaria erikae
- Trigonidium lankesteri = Maxillaria luisae
- Trigonidium loretoense = Maxillaria briggittheae
- Trigonidium macranthum = Maxillaria macrantha
- Trigonidium monophyllum = Neocogniauxia monophylla
- Trigonidium obtusum = Maxillaria obtusa
- Trigonidium riopalenquense = Maxillaria soulangeana
- Trigonidium seemannii = Maxillaria egertoniana
- Trigonidium spatulatum = Maxillaria egertoniana
- Trigonidium subrepens = Maxillaria subrepens
- Trigonidium tenue = Maxillaria subrepens
- Trigonidium turbinatum = Maxillaria turbinata

== Cultivation ==
Plants formerly placed in the genus grow well in pots with standard epiphyte mix, in intermediate conditions with light shade and high humidity. Plants should be kept dry but not so dry that pseudobulbs shrivel.
