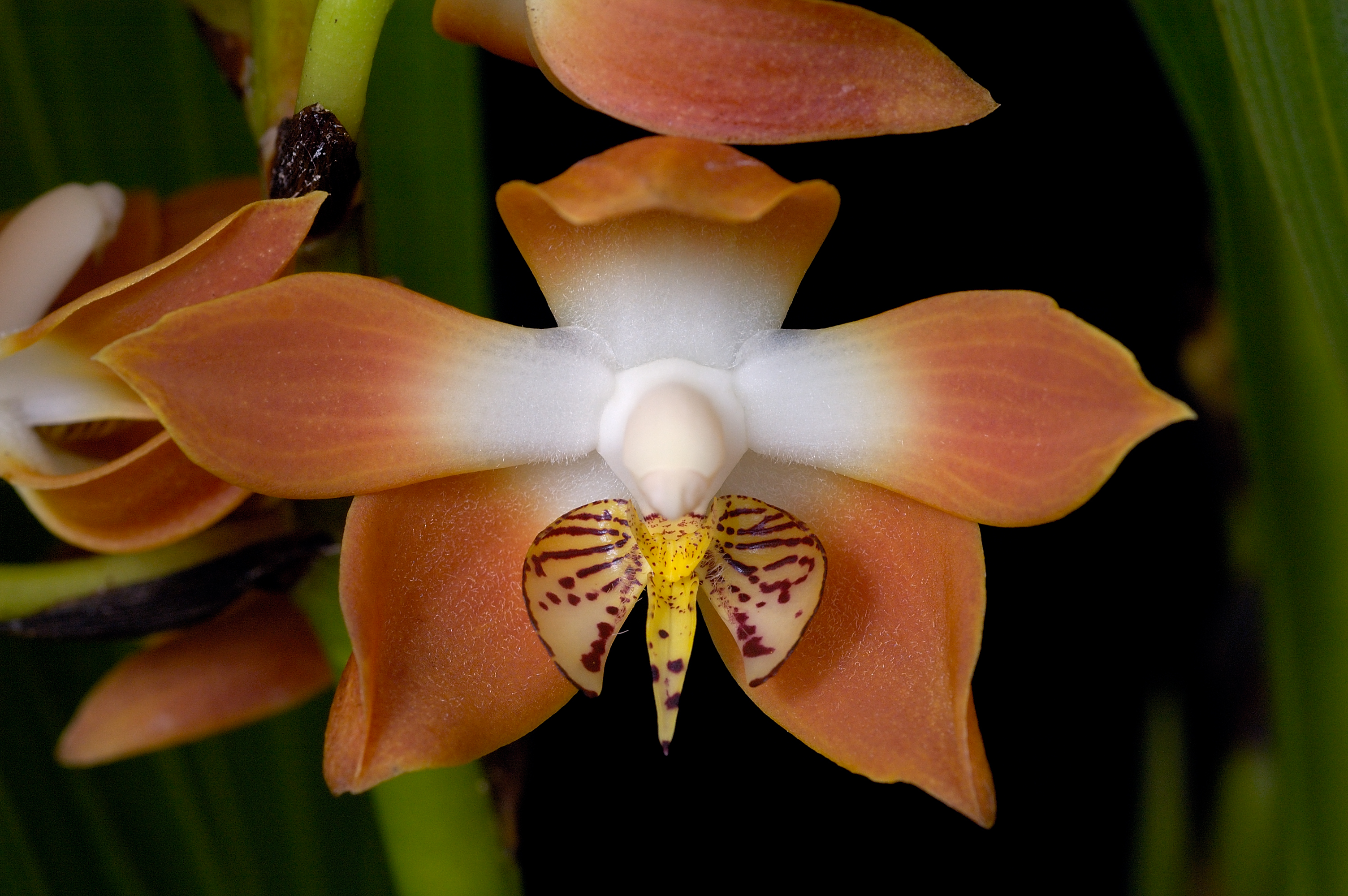
- Neomoorea wallisii

Scientific classification
- Kingdom: Plantae
- Clade: Tracheophytes
- Clade: Angiosperms
- Clade: Monocots
- Order: Asparagales
- Family: Orchidaceae
- Subfamily: Epidendroideae
- Tribe: Cymbidieae
- Subtribe: Maxillariinae
- Genus: Neomoorea; Rolfe
- Species: N. wallisii

Binomial name
- Neomoorea wallisii (Rchb.f.) Schltr.

Synonyms
- Moorea Rolfenom. illeg.; Lueddemannia wallisii Rchb.f.; Moorea irrorata Rolfe; Neomoorea irrorata (Rolfe) Rolfe

= Neomoorea =

Genus of orchids

Neomoorea is a genus of orchids native to Panama, Ecuador and Colombia. It contains only one known species, Neomoorea wallisii.
