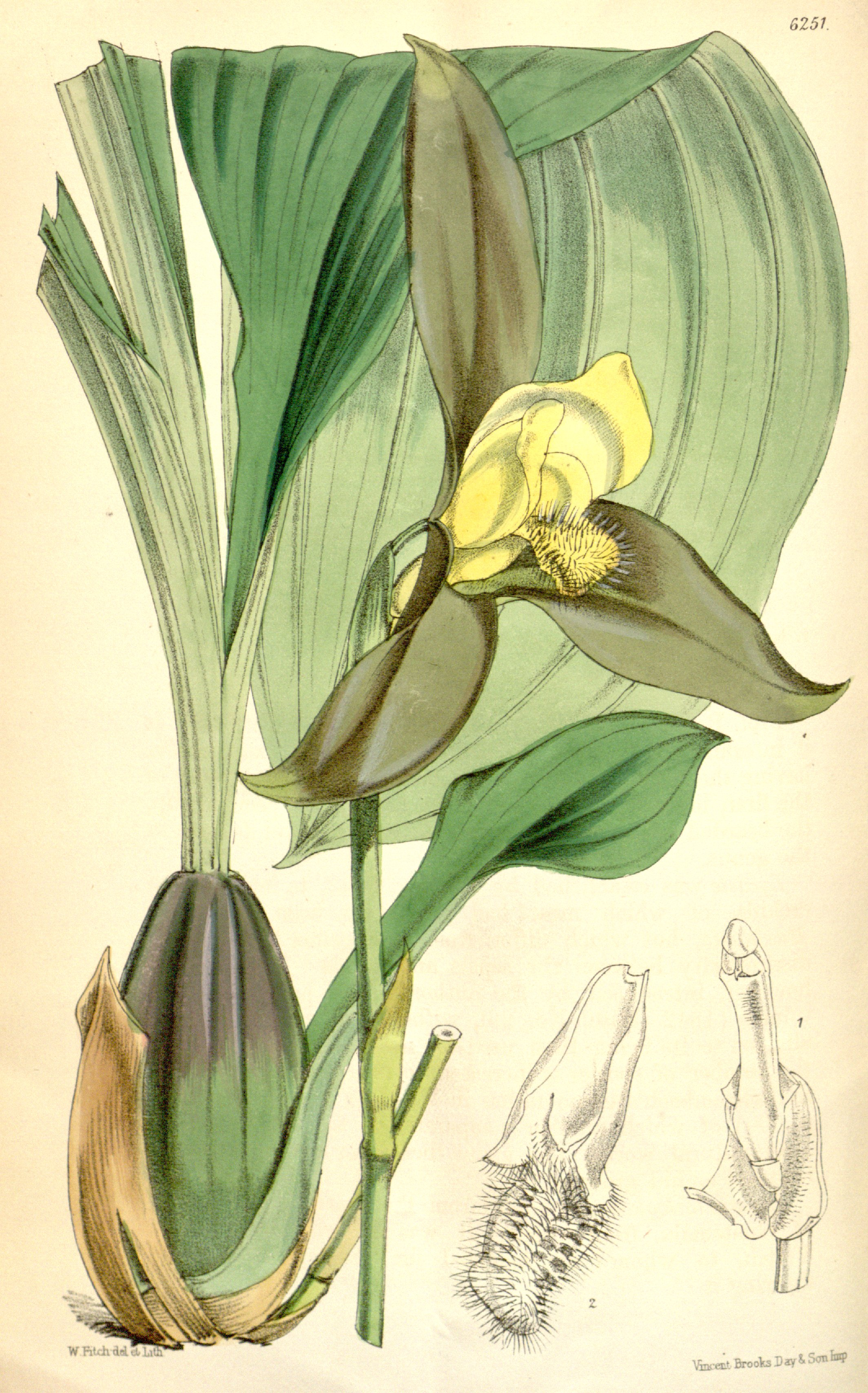

Scientific classification
- Kingdom: Plantae
- Clade: Tracheophytes
- Clade: Angiosperms
- Clade: Monocots
- Order: Asparagales
- Family: Orchidaceae
- Subfamily: Epidendroideae
- Genus: Lycaste
- Species: L. lasioglossa

Binomial name
- Lycaste lasioglossa Rchb.f.

Synonyms
- Lycaste macropogon Rchb.f.; Lycaste lasioglossa var. melanacra Cogn.

= Lycaste lasioglossa =

Species of orchid

Lycaste lasioglossa is a species of terrestrial orchid native to Mexico, Honduras, Guatemala and El Salvador.
