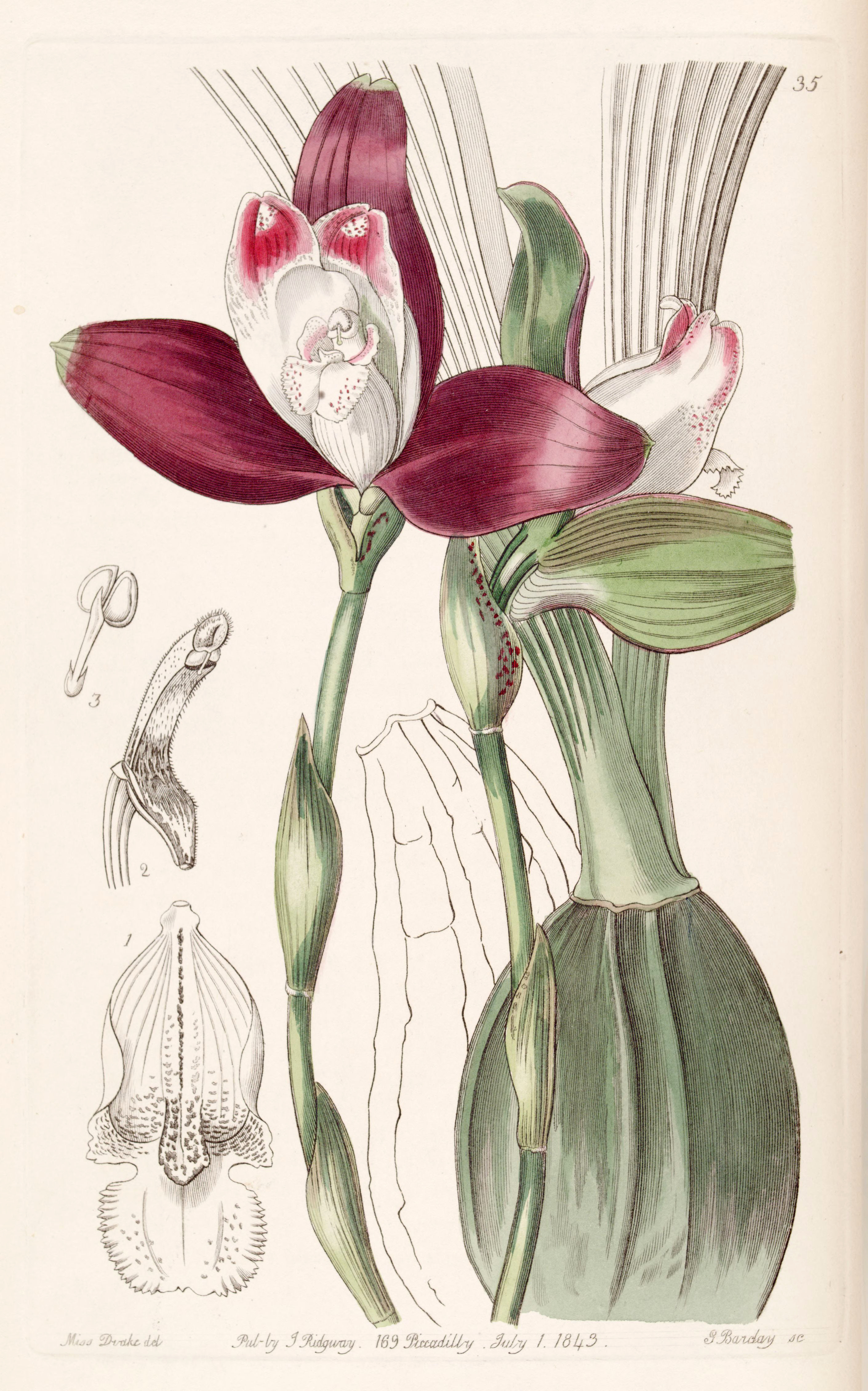

Scientific classification
- Kingdom: Plantae
- Clade: Tracheophytes
- Clade: Angiosperms
- Clade: Monocots
- Order: Asparagales
- Family: Orchidaceae
- Subfamily: Epidendroideae
- Genus: Lycaste
- Species: L. macrophylla

Binomial name
- Lycaste macrophylla (Poepp. & Endl.) Lindl.

Synonyms
- Maxillaria macrophylla Poepp. & Endl. (basionym); Maxillaria phyllomega Steud.; Lycaste plana Lindl.; Lycaste filomenoi Schltr.; Lycaste macrophylla subsp. filomenoi (Schltr.) Fowlie; Lycaste macrophylla subsp. plana (Lindl.) Fowlie; Lycaste macrophylla var. plana (Lindl.) Oakeley

= Lycaste macrophylla =

Species of plant

Lycaste macrophylla is a species of terrestrial orchid native to Costa Rica, Nicaragua, Panama, Colombia, Ecuador, Venezuela, Peru and Bolivia. It is the type species of the genus Lycaste.
