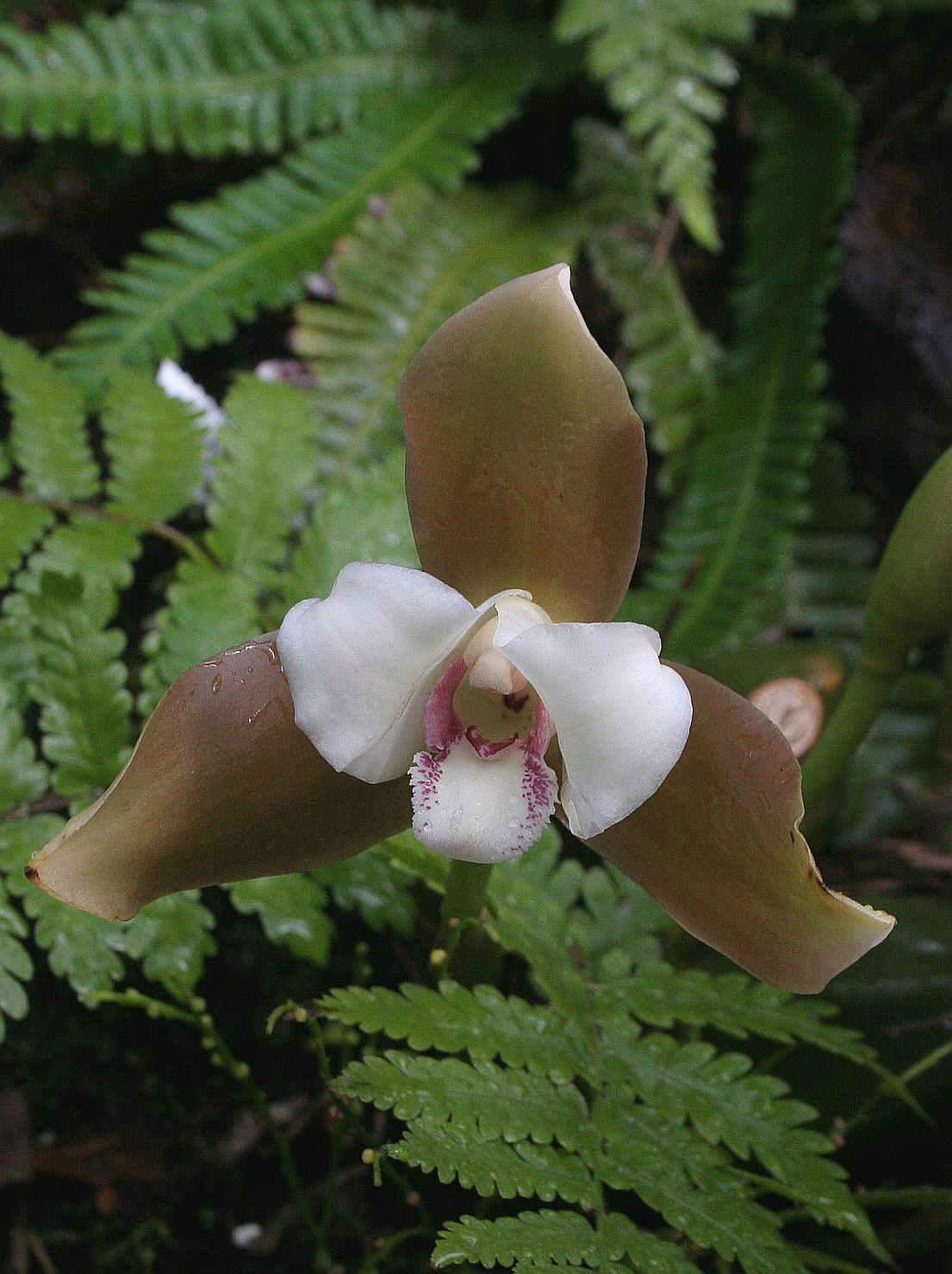

Scientific classification
- Kingdom: Plantae
- Clade: Tracheophytes
- Clade: Angiosperms
- Clade: Monocots
- Order: Asparagales
- Family: Orchidaceae
- Subfamily: Epidendroideae
- Genus: Lycaste
- Species: L. powellii

Binomial name
- Lycaste powellii Schltr.

= Lycaste powellii =

Species of orchid

Lycaste powellii is a species of terrestrial orchid endemic to Panama and Colombia.
