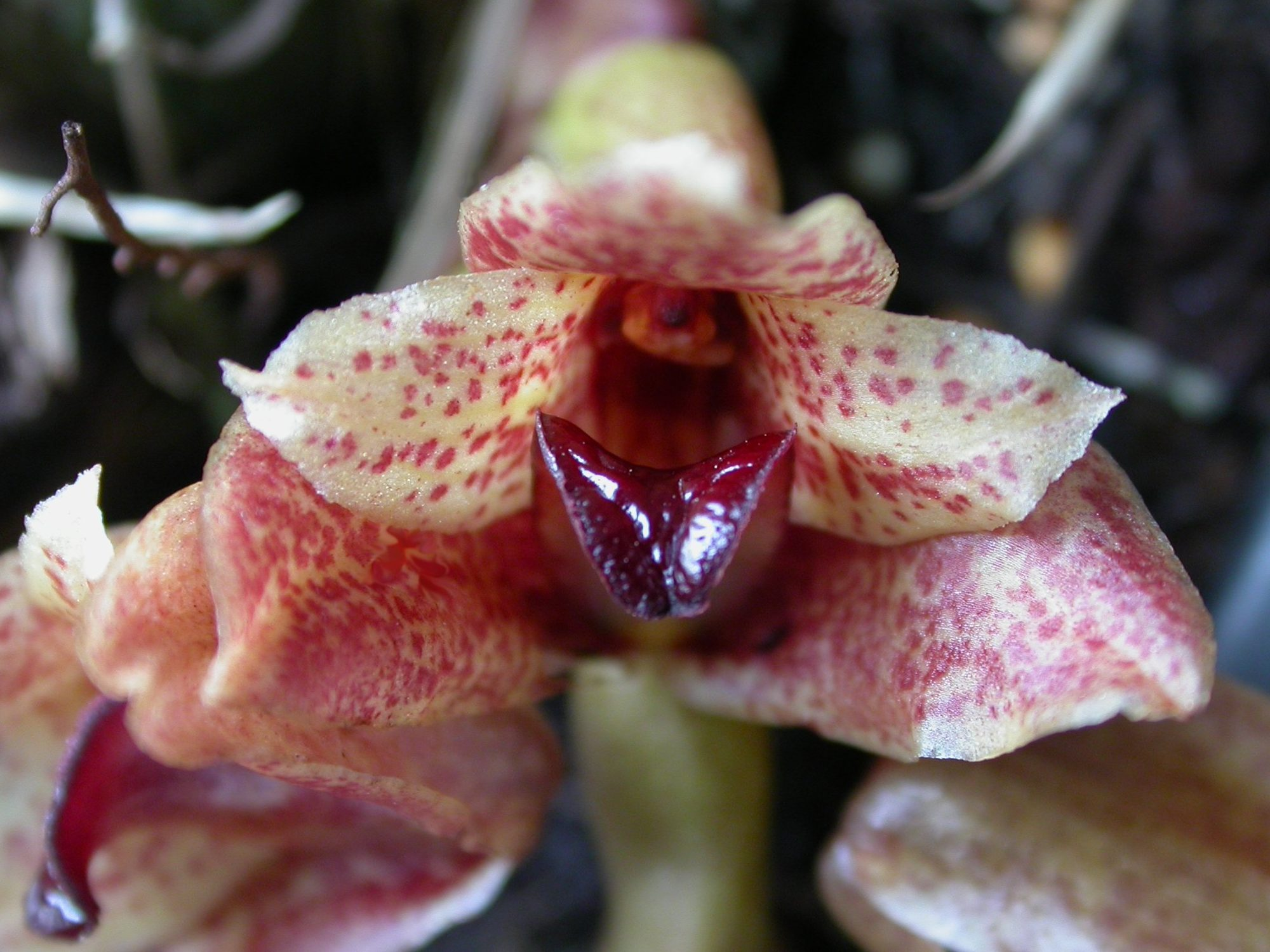
- Xylobium colleyi

Scientific classification
- Kingdom: Plantae
- Clade: Tracheophytes
- Clade: Angiosperms
- Clade: Monocots
- Order: Asparagales
- Family: Orchidaceae
- Subfamily: Epidendroideae
- Tribe: Cymbidieae
- Subtribe: Maxillariinae
- Genus: Xylobium; Lindl. (1825)

Type species
- Xylobium squalens (Lindl.) Lindl.

Selected species
- Xylobium bractescens; Xylobium citronum; Xylobium colleyi; Xylobium corrugatum; Xylobium elatum; Xylobium elongatum; Xylobium foveatum; Xylobium hyacinthinum; Xylobium latilabium; Xylobium leontoglossum; Xylobium pallidiflorum; Xylobium palmifolium; Xylobium peruvianum; Xylobium scandens; Xylobium squalens; Xylobium tuerckheimii; Xylobium variegatum

Synonyms
- Onkeripus Raf. (1838); Pentulops Raf. (1838)

= Xylobium =

Genus of orchids

Xylobium, abbreviated Xyl in horticultural trade, is a genus of plants in family Orchidaceae. It contains about 35 species native to tropical America.
