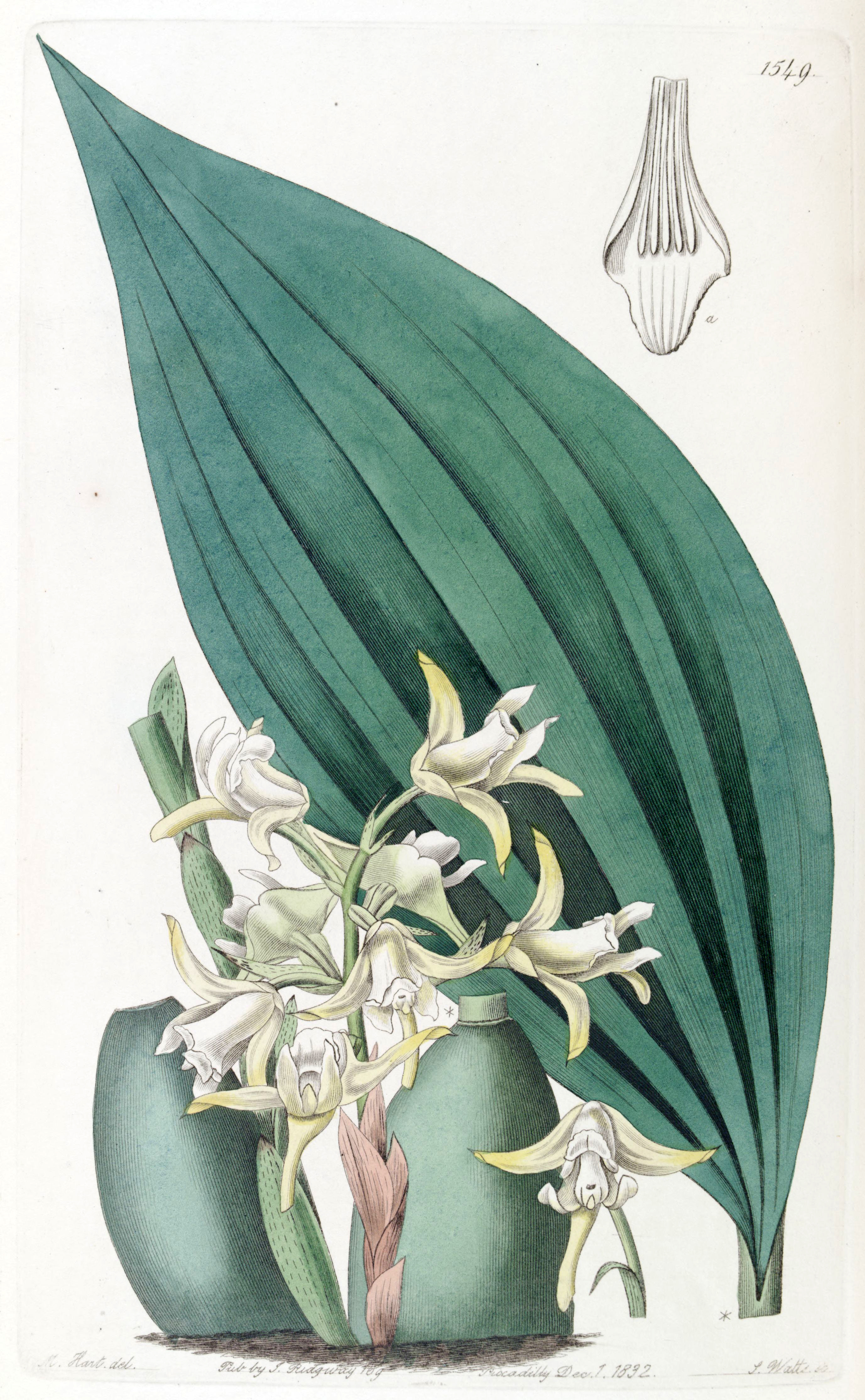

Scientific classification
- Kingdom: Plantae
- Clade: Tracheophytes
- Clade: Angiosperms
- Clade: Monocots
- Order: Asparagales
- Family: Orchidaceae
- Subfamily: Epidendroideae
- Genus: Xylobium
- Species: X. palmifolium

Binomial name
- Xylobium palmifolium (Sw.) Fawc.

Synonyms
- Epidendrum palmifolium Sw. (basionym); Dendrobium palmifolium (Sw.) Sw.; Colax palmifolius (Sw.) Lindl. ex Spreng.; Maxillaria decolor Lindl.; Maxillaria palmifolia (Sw.) Lindl.; Pentulops discolor Raf.; Xylobium decolor (Lindl.) G.Nicholson; Xylobium palmifolium (Sw.) Fawc.

= Xylobium palmifolium =

Species of orchid

Xylobium palmifolium is a species of orchid found in Cuba, Jamaica, Haiti and the Dominican Republic.
