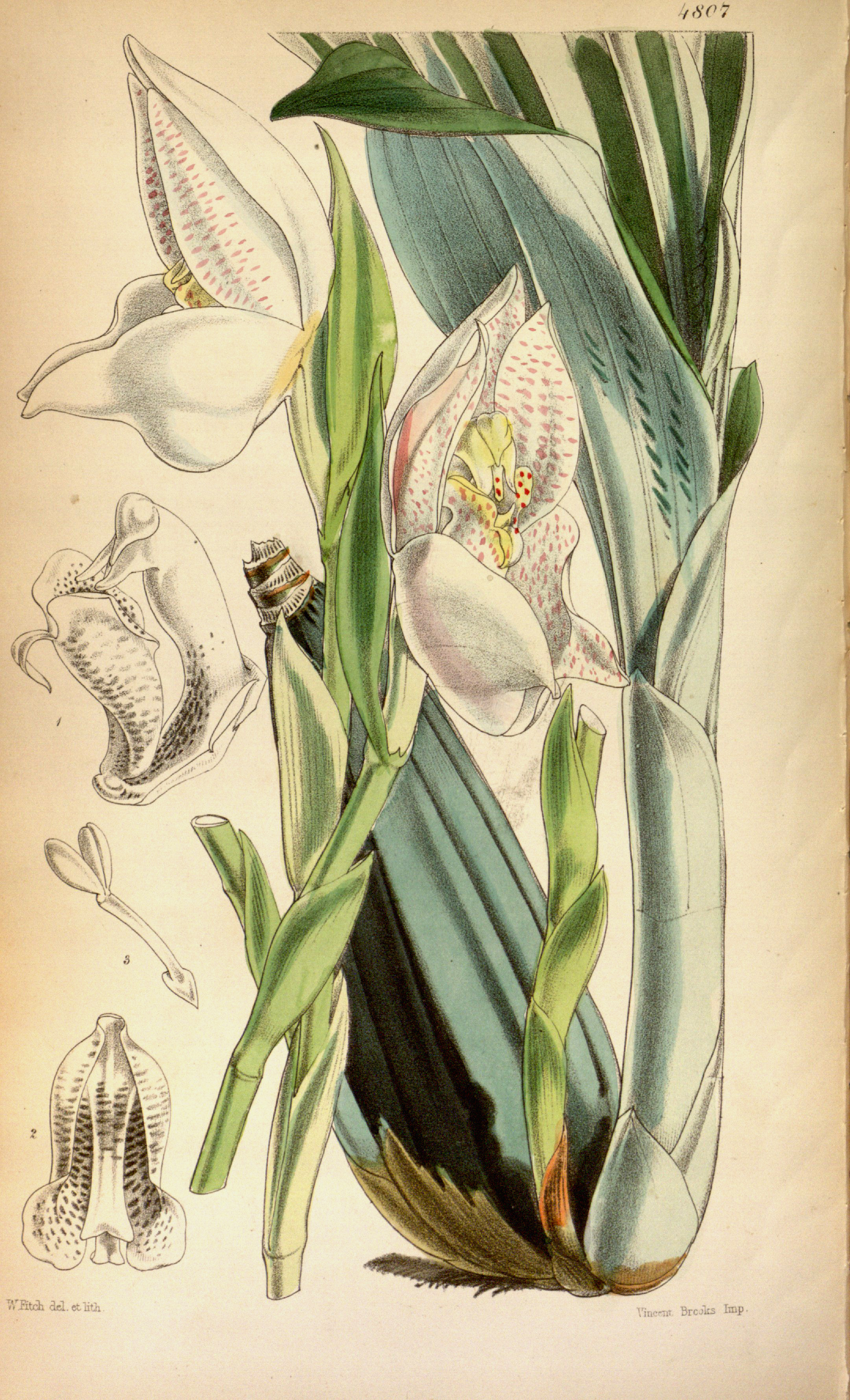

Scientific classification
- Kingdom: Plantae
- Clade: Tracheophytes
- Clade: Angiosperms
- Clade: Monocots
- Order: Asparagales
- Family: Orchidaceae
- Subfamily: Epidendroideae
- Genus: Anguloa
- Species: A. uniflora

Binomial name
- Anguloa uniflora Ruiz & Pav.

Synonyms
- Anguloa uniflora var. treyeranii Rolfe

= Anguloa uniflora =

Species of orchid

Anguloa uniflora, commonly known as the swaddled babies orchid, is a species of orchid in the family Orchidaceae. It is the type species of its genus.

== Taxonomy ==
It was described by Hipólito Ruiz López and José Antonio Pavón Jiménez in 1798.

=== Etymology ===
The specific epithet uniflora means one-flowered.
