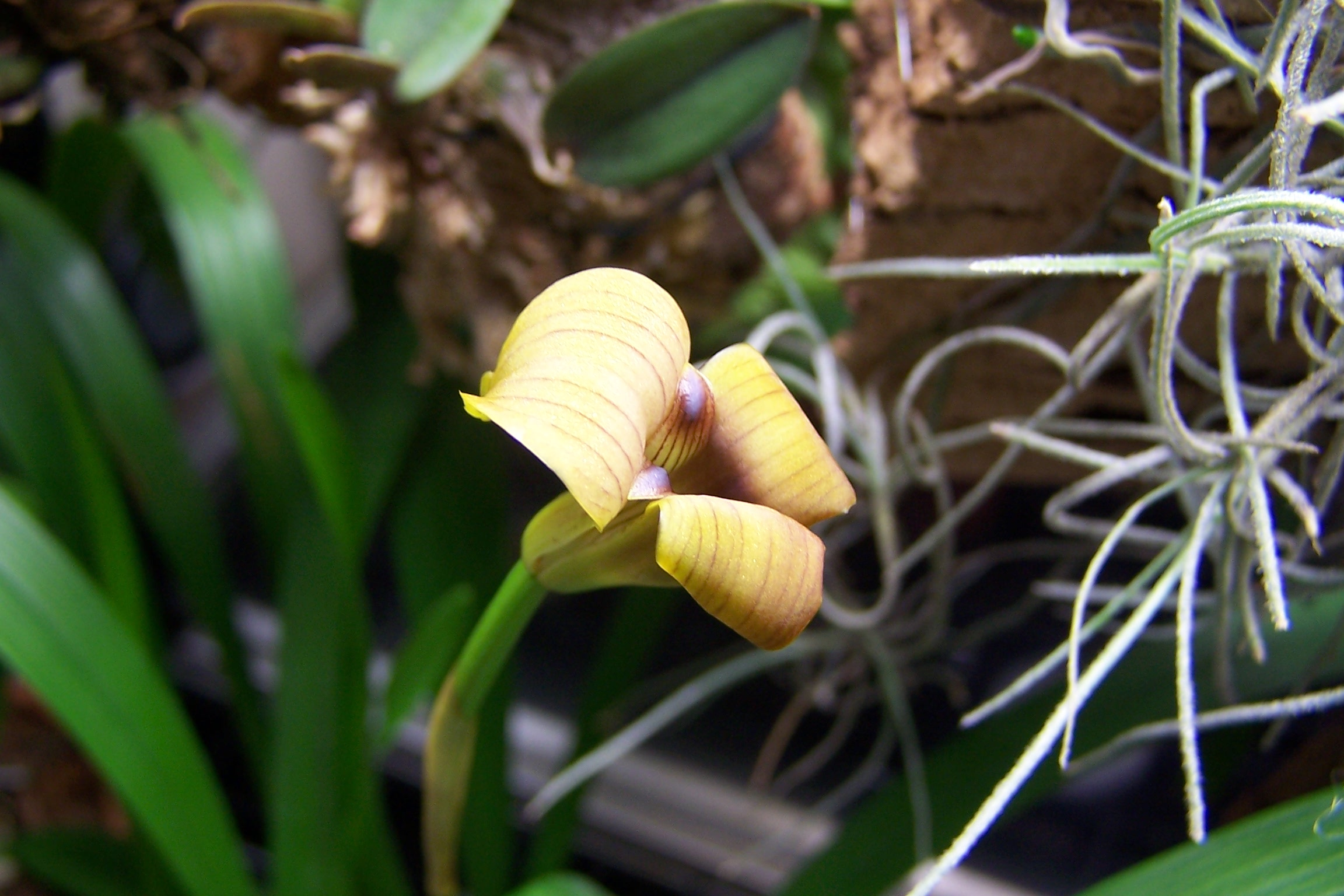

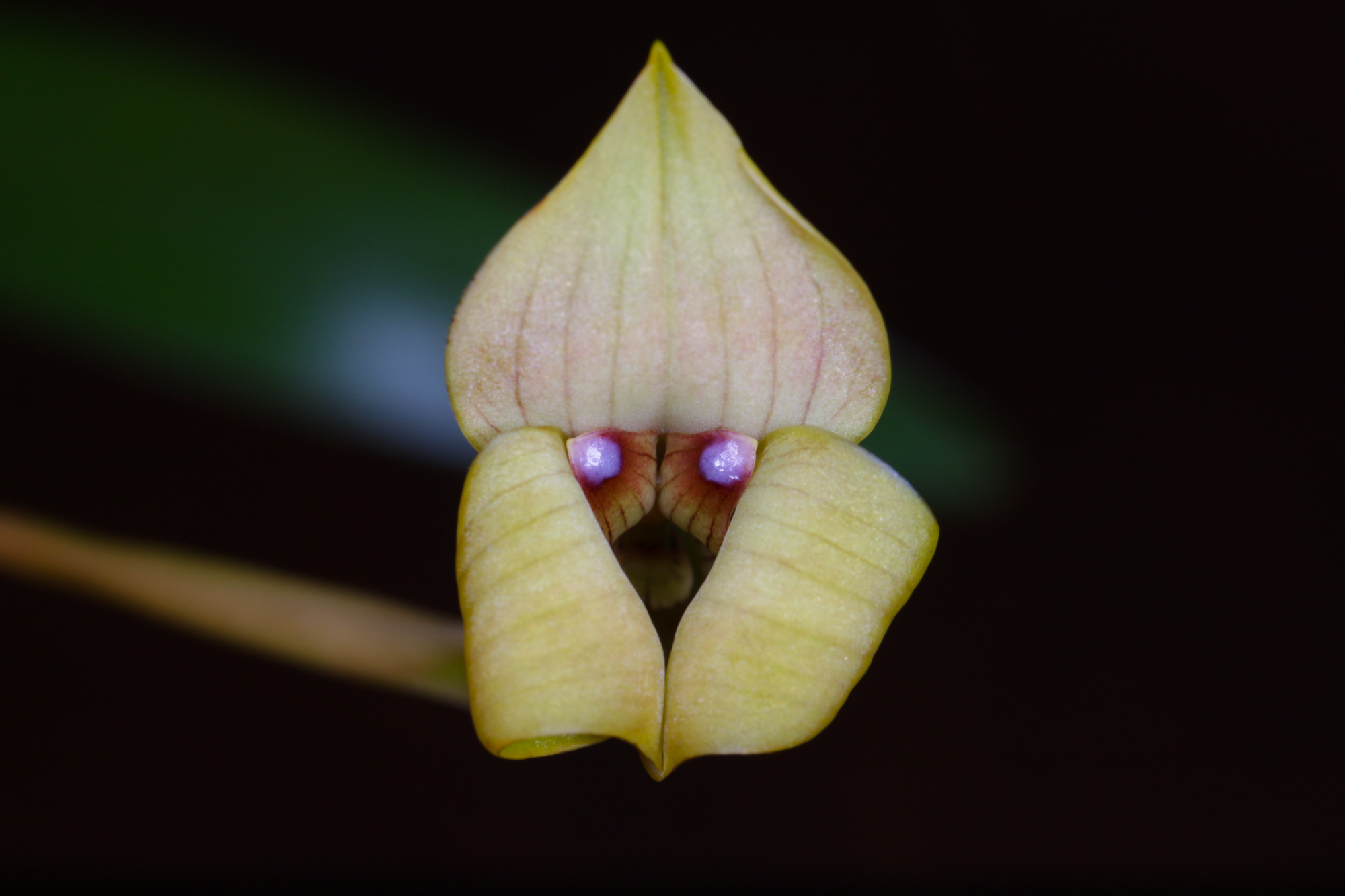

Scientific classification
- Kingdom: Plantae
- Clade: Tracheophytes
- Clade: Angiosperms
- Clade: Monocots
- Order: Asparagales
- Family: Orchidaceae
- Subfamily: Epidendroideae
- Genus: Trigonidium
- Species: T. egertonianum

Binomial name
- Trigonidium egertonianum Lindl.

= Maxillaria egertoniana =

Species of orchid

Trigonidium egertonianum is an orchid found in Central and South America.

== Taxonomy ==
The specific epithet "egertonianum" is named for Sir Philip Grey Egerton.

== Description ==
Trigonidium egertonianum has densely clustered pseudobulbs, ovoid in shape with two leaves. The orchid's inflorescence arises on mature growths, ranging from 25–45 cm (9.8–17.7 in) in length. Its flowers are 3–4 cm (1.2–1.6 in) long and bell shaped. The sepals, petals, and lip are yellow-green to pinkish brown, with brown veins and markings. The species is epiphytic and grows on large, wet branches up to 900 m (3,000 ft) in altitude.

The species produces extrafloral nectar.
