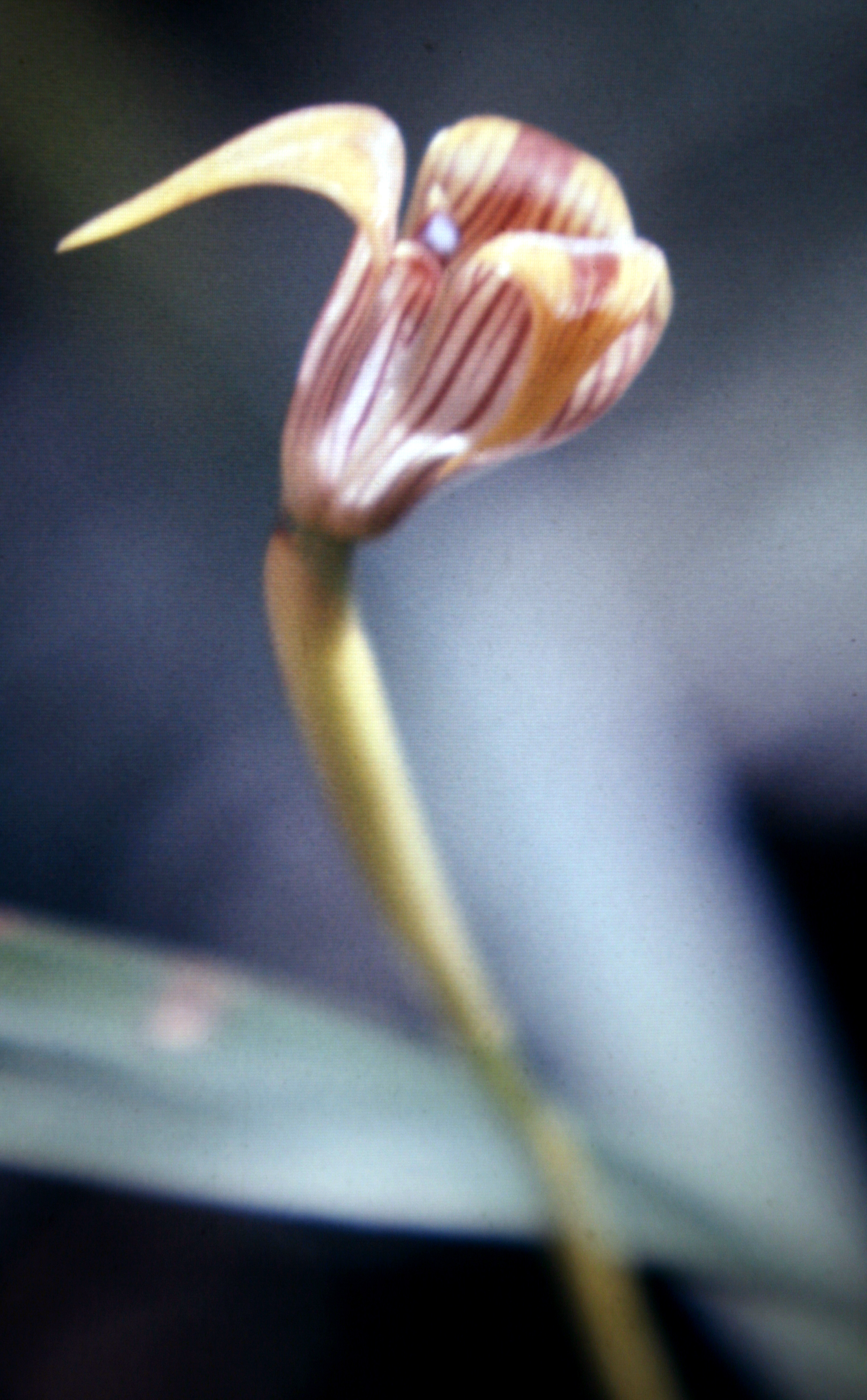
- Flower

Scientific classification
- Kingdom: Plantae
- Clade: Tracheophytes
- Clade: Angiosperms
- Clade: Monocots
- Order: Asparagales
- Family: Orchidaceae
- Subfamily: Epidendroideae
- Genus: Maxillaria
- Species: M. subrepens

Binomial name
- Maxillaria subrepens (Rolfe) Schuit. & M.W.Chase

Synonyms
- Maxillaria danielae Molinari; Trigonidium acuminatum Bateman ex Lindl.; Trigonidium peruvianum Schltr.; Trigonidium subrepens Rolfe; Trigonidium tenue Lodd. ex Lindl.

= Maxillaria subrepens =

Species of orchid

Maxillaria subrepens is an orchid found in tropical South America.

== Description ==
Maxillaria subrepens is 15–18 cm (5.9–7.1 in) tall with fluted pseudobulbs and a narrow leaf that curves over at the tip. The flowering stem is slightly taller than the leaves, bearing a striped yellow-brown flower 1.7 cm (0.67 in) wide. The long sepals form a tubular flower that opens at the end. The reddish eyespots of the small petals are located within the tube. These eyespots attract male bees to perform pseudocopulation with the orchid's blossom. The petals are ovoid and taper at the tip, and are similar in hue to the sepals. The lip and column are hidden within the tube.
