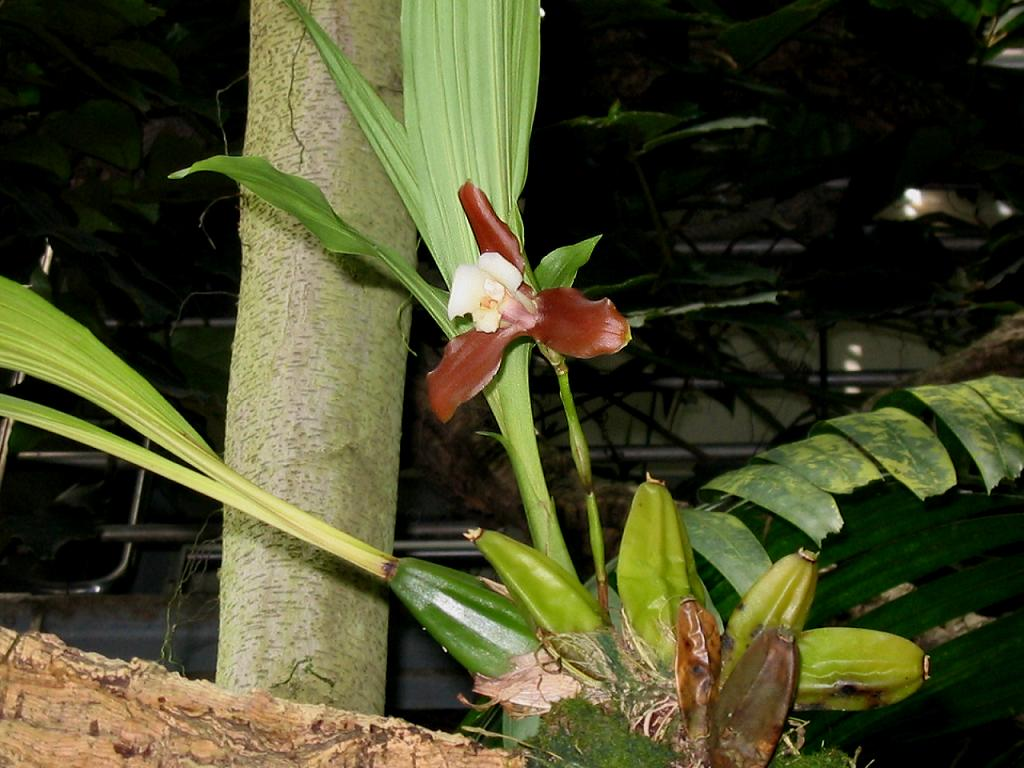

Scientific classification
- Kingdom: Plantae
- Clade: Tracheophytes
- Clade: Angiosperms
- Clade: Monocots
- Order: Asparagales
- Family: Orchidaceae
- Subfamily: Epidendroideae
- Genus: Lycaste
- Species: L. xytriophora

Binomial name
- Lycaste xytriophora Linden & Rchb.f.

Synonyms
- Lycaste xytriophora var. rosea Oakeley

= Lycaste xytriophora =

Species of orchid

Lycaste xytriophora is a species of flowering plant in the family Orchidaceae. This terrestrial orchid is native to Colombia and Ecuador.
