= Horvatia =

Scientific classification
- Kingdom: Plantae
- Clade: Tracheophytes
- Clade: Angiosperms
- Clade: Monocots
- Order: Asparagales
- Family: Orchidaceae
- Subfamily: Epidendroideae
- Tribe: Cymbidieae
- Subtribe: Maxillariinae
- Genus: Horvatia; Garay
- Species: H. andicola

Binomial name
- Horvatia andicola Garay

Genus of orchids

Horvatia is a genus of flowering plants from the orchid family, Orchidaceae. It contains only one known species, Horvatia andicola, which is endemic to Ecuador.

== See also ==
- List of Orchidaceae genera
