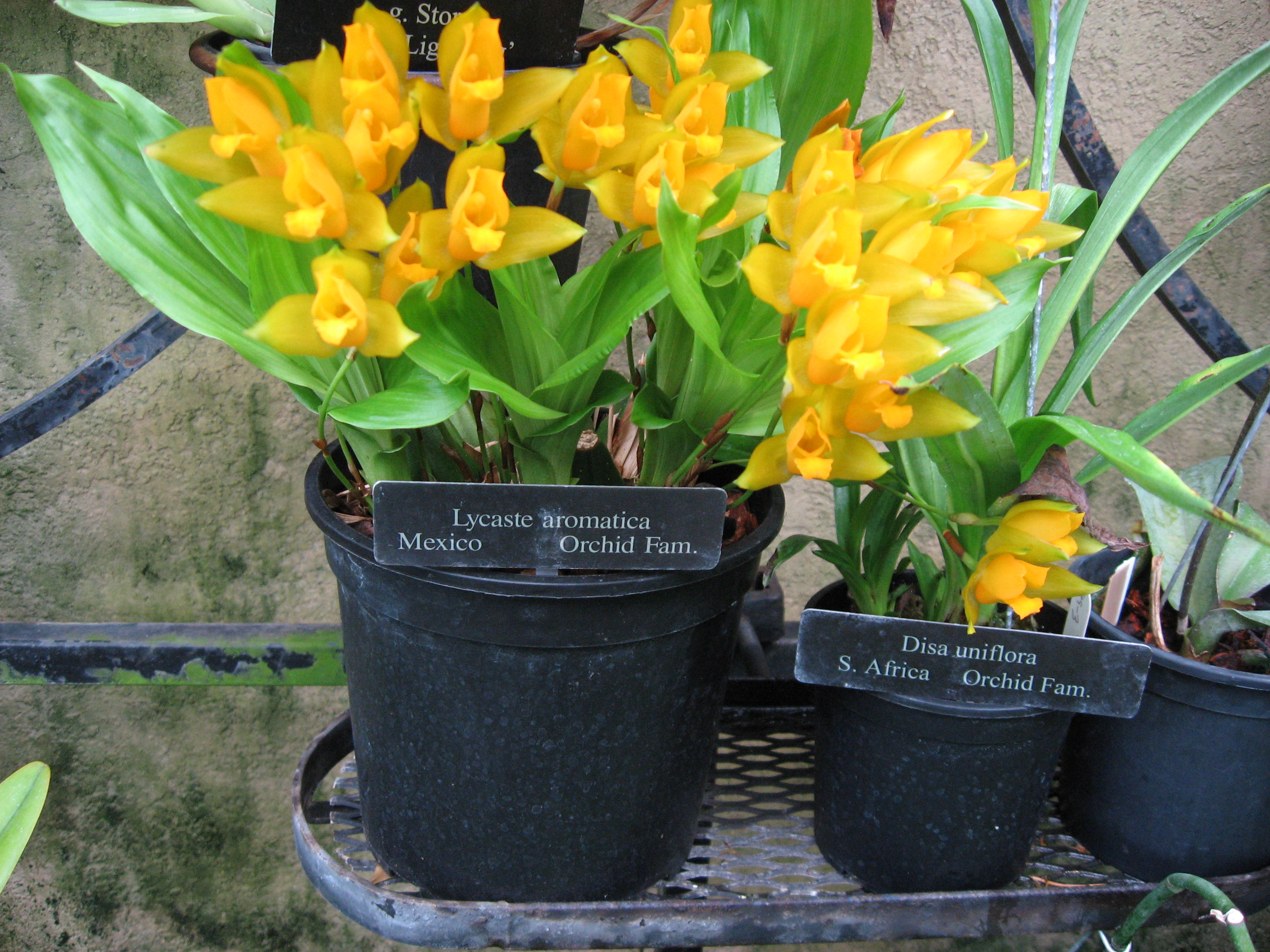

Scientific classification
- Kingdom: Plantae
- Clade: Tracheophytes
- Clade: Angiosperms
- Clade: Monocots
- Order: Asparagales
- Family: Orchidaceae
- Subfamily: Epidendroideae
- Genus: Lycaste
- Species: L. aromatica

Binomial name
- Lycaste aromatica (Graham) Lindl.

= Lycaste aromatica =

Species of orchid

Lycaste aromatica, common name the sweet scented lycaste, is a species of flowering plant in the genus Lycaste of the family Orchidaceae.

== Description ==
Lycaste aromatica has ovate pseudobulbs, deciduous lanceolate leaves and erect flowered spikes about 15 centimetres (5.9 in) long. Flower are yellow-orange and fragrant, about 7 centimetres (2.8 in) wide. The flowering period extends from late spring through summer. It is a terrestrial orchid growing on mossy branches (epiphyte).

== Distribution ==
This plant is native to Central America and it is present in Mexico, Belize, Guatemala, Nicaragua, Honduras and El Salvador.

== Habitat ==
Lycaste aromatica grows on branches with moss, in damp limestone cliffs and in tropical semi-deciduous forests or warm oak forests along streams. It prefers diffused bright light in moist and cool to warm climate, at an altitude of 500–2,000 metres (1,600–6,600 ft) above sea level.

== Synonyms ==
- Maxillaria aromatica Graham (basionym)
- Colax aromaticus (Graham) Spreng.
- Lycaste aromatica var. bartleyi Oakeley
- Lycaste aromatica var. hartleyorum Oakeley
- Lycaste aromatica var. majus auct 1926
- Lycaste aromatica var. retroflexa Oakeley 2001
- Lycaste consobrina Rchb.f. 1852
- Lycaste suaveolens Summerh. 1931
- Maxillaria consobrina Beer ex Schltr.?

== Gallery ==
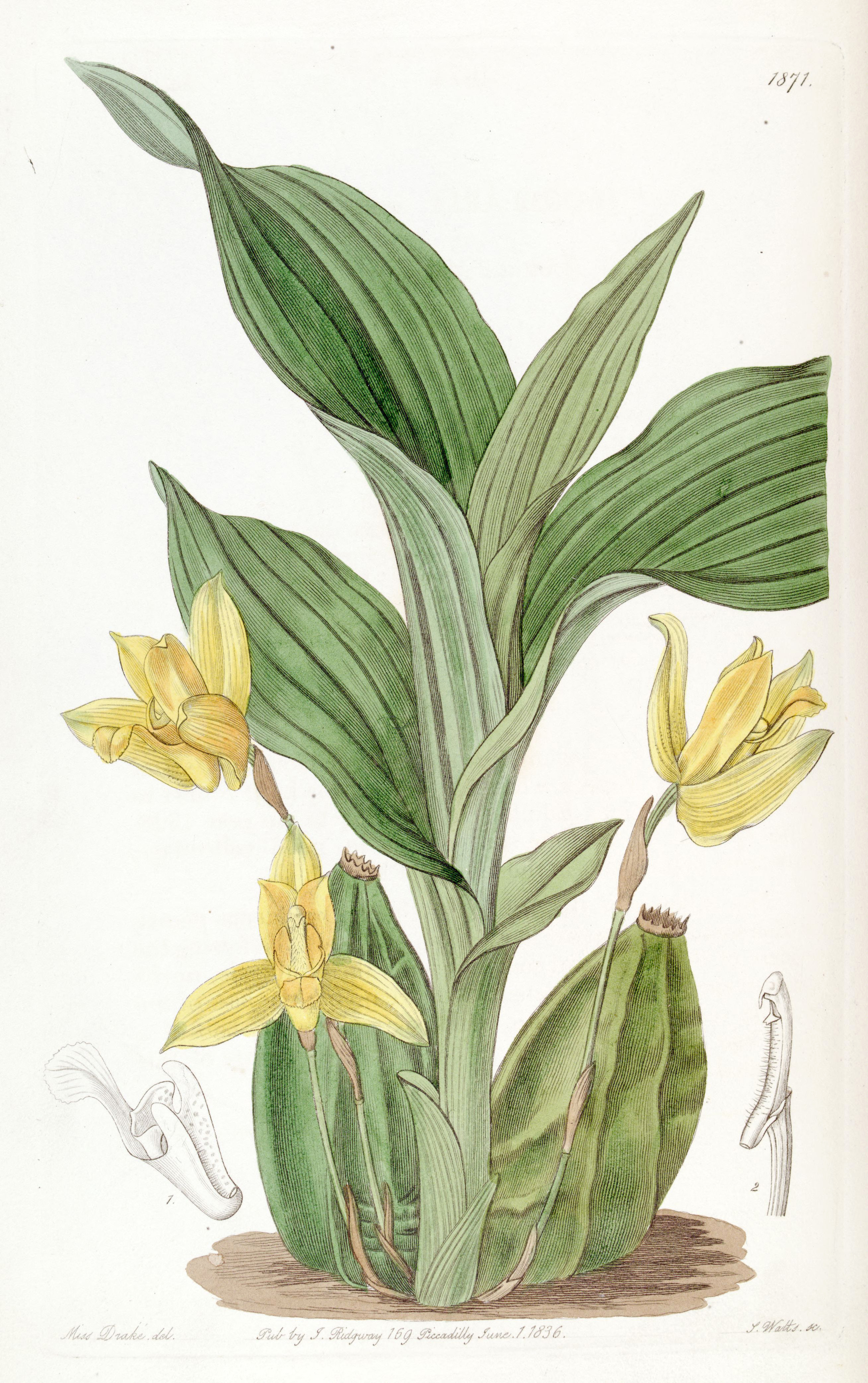
Illustration of "Lycaste aromatica" from Edwards's Botanical Register, Vol 22 (1836)

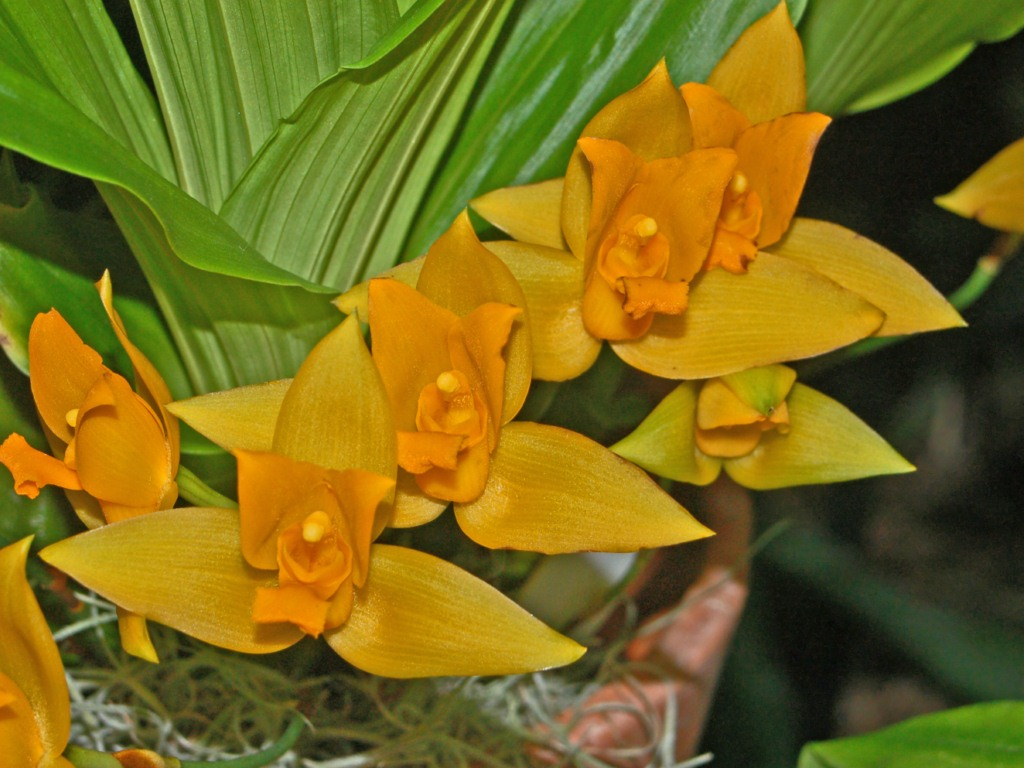
"Lycaste aromatica"
