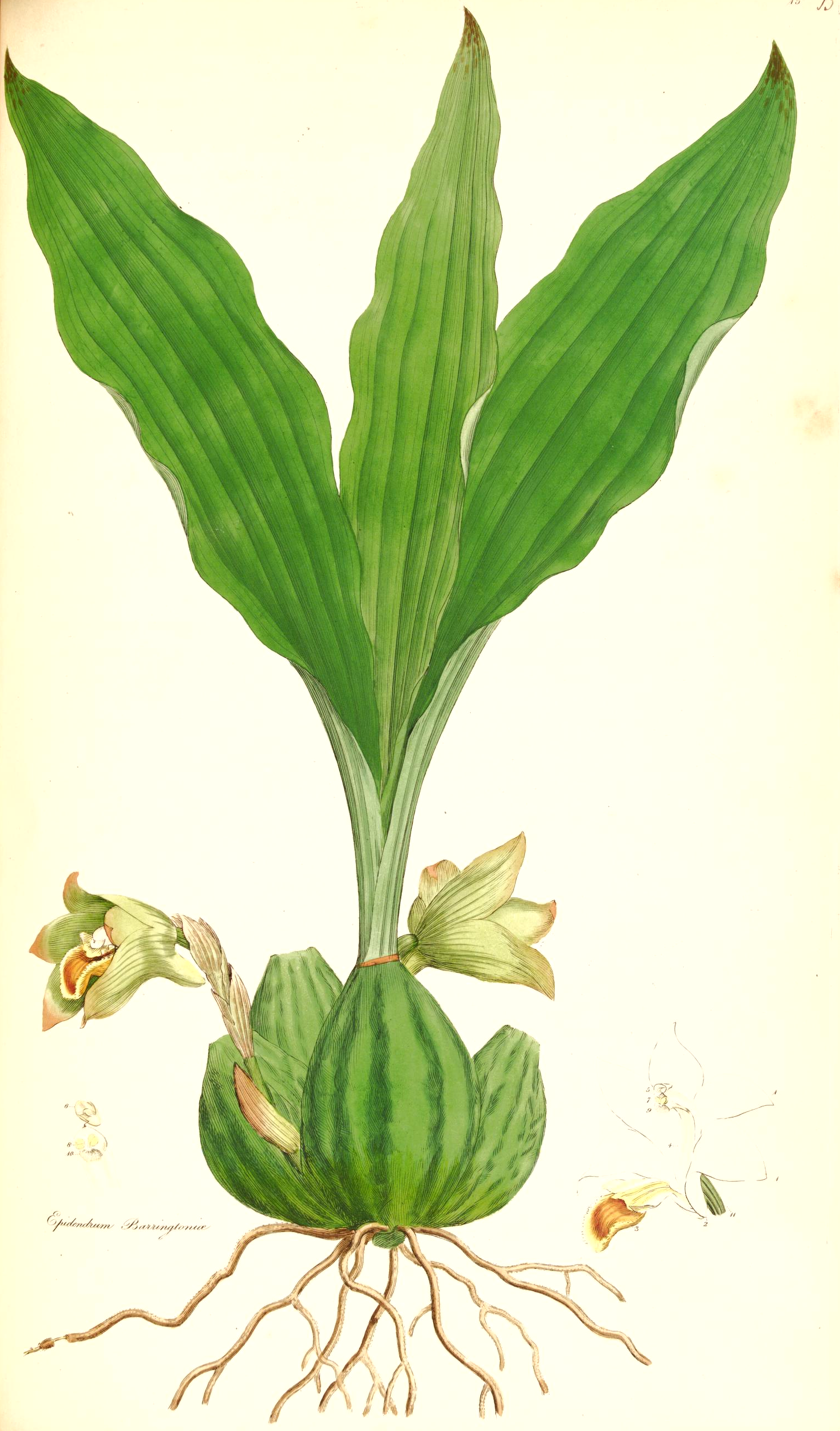
- Ida barringtoniae

Scientific classification
- Kingdom: Plantae
- Clade: Tracheophytes
- Clade: Angiosperms
- Clade: Monocots
- Order: Asparagales
- Family: Orchidaceae
- Subfamily: Epidendroideae
- Tribe: Cymbidieae
- Subtribe: Maxillariinae
- Genus: Ida; A.Ryan & Oakeley

Species
- See text.

Synonyms
- Sudamerlycaste Archila, nom. superfl.

= Ida (plant) =

Genus of orchids

Ida, synonym Sudamerlycaste, is a genus of flowering plants in the family Orchidaceae. It consists of approximately 45 species and hybrids. The genus was split off from Lycaste in the early 2000s.

== Taxonomy ==
From 2001 onwards, species in Lycaste that were endemic to South America and the Caribbean Islands were placed into a new genus. Those found in Mexico and Central America stayed in Lycaste. As a result of this change, most of the species previously found in the Lycaste section Fimbriatae were moved to a new genus. The name to be used for this genus has been subject to some confusion. In 2001, Brieger published the name Ida, attributing it to Angela Ryan and Henry Oakeley. However, no Latin description was given, rendering the name illegitimate. Ryan and Oakeley validated the name in a publication dated to 2003. Separately, Fredy Archila Morales published Sudamerlycaste, but without a Latin description, so the name was illegitimate. Archila corrected this in a publication that has been dated to 2009, but included the type of Ryan and Oakeley's earlier published Ida, so this was the name that should have been used.

=== Species ===
As of August 2023, Plants of the World Online accepted the following species:

- Ida acaroi Oakeley
- Ida alexportillae (J.Portilla, H.Medina & I.Portilla) J.M.H.Shaw
- Ida andreettae (Dodson) Oakeley
- Ida angustitepala Oakeley
- Ida ariasii Oakeley
- Ida barringtoniae (Sm.) A.Ryan & Oakeley
- Ida barrowiorum Oakeley
- Ida castanea Oakeley
- Ida ciliata (Ruiz & Pav.) A.Ryan & Oakeley
- Ida cinnabarina (Lindl.) A.Ryan & Oakeley
- Ida cobbiana (B.S.Williams) A.Ryan & Oakeley
- Ida costata (Lindl.) A.Ryan & Oakeley
- Ida diastasia (D.E.Benn. & Oakeley) A.Ryan & Oakeley
- Ida dunstervillei (Bergold) A.Ryan & Oakeley
- Ida dyeriana (Sander ex Mast.) Oakeley
- Ida ecuadorensis (J.Portilla, H.Medina & I.Portilla) J.M.H.Shaw
- Ida ejirii Oakeley
- Ida fimbriata (Poepp. & Endl.) A.Ryan & Oakeley
- Ida fulvescens (Hook.) A.Ryan & Oakeley
- Ida gigantea (Lindl.) A.Ryan & Oakeley
- Ida grandis Fowlie ex Oakeley
- Ida heynderycxii (É.Morren) A.Ryan & Oakeley
- Ida hirtzii (Dodson) A.Ryan & Oakeley
- Ida insolita (Szlach. & Kolan.) Ormerod
- Ida jamesiorum Oakeley
- Ida jimenezii Oakeley
- Ida lacheliniae Oakeley
- Ida laciniata Oakeley
- Ida lanipes (Lindl.) J.M.H.Shaw
- Ida lata (Rolfe) A.Ryan & Oakeley
- Ida linguella (Rchb.f.) A.Ryan & Oakeley
- Ida lionetii Cogn. & A.Gooss. ex Oakeley
- Ida locusta (Rchb.f.) A.Ryan & Oakeley
- Ida maxibractea (D.E.Benn. & Oakeley) A.Ryan & Oakeley
- Ida × monopampanensis Oakeley
- Ida munaensis Oakeley
- Ida nana (Oakeley) A.Ryan & Oakeley
- Ida pegueroi (Archila) J.M.H.Shaw
- Ida peruviana (Rolfe) A.Ryan & Oakeley
- Ida priscilae I.Portilla ex Oakeley
- Ida reichenbachii (Gireoud ex Rchb.f.) A.Ryan & Oakeley
- Ida rikii Oakeley
- Ida rossyi (Hoehne) Campacci & Baptista
- Ida shigerui Oakeley
- Ida × tornemezae Oakeley
- Ida × troyanoi Oakeley
- Ida uribei Oakeley
