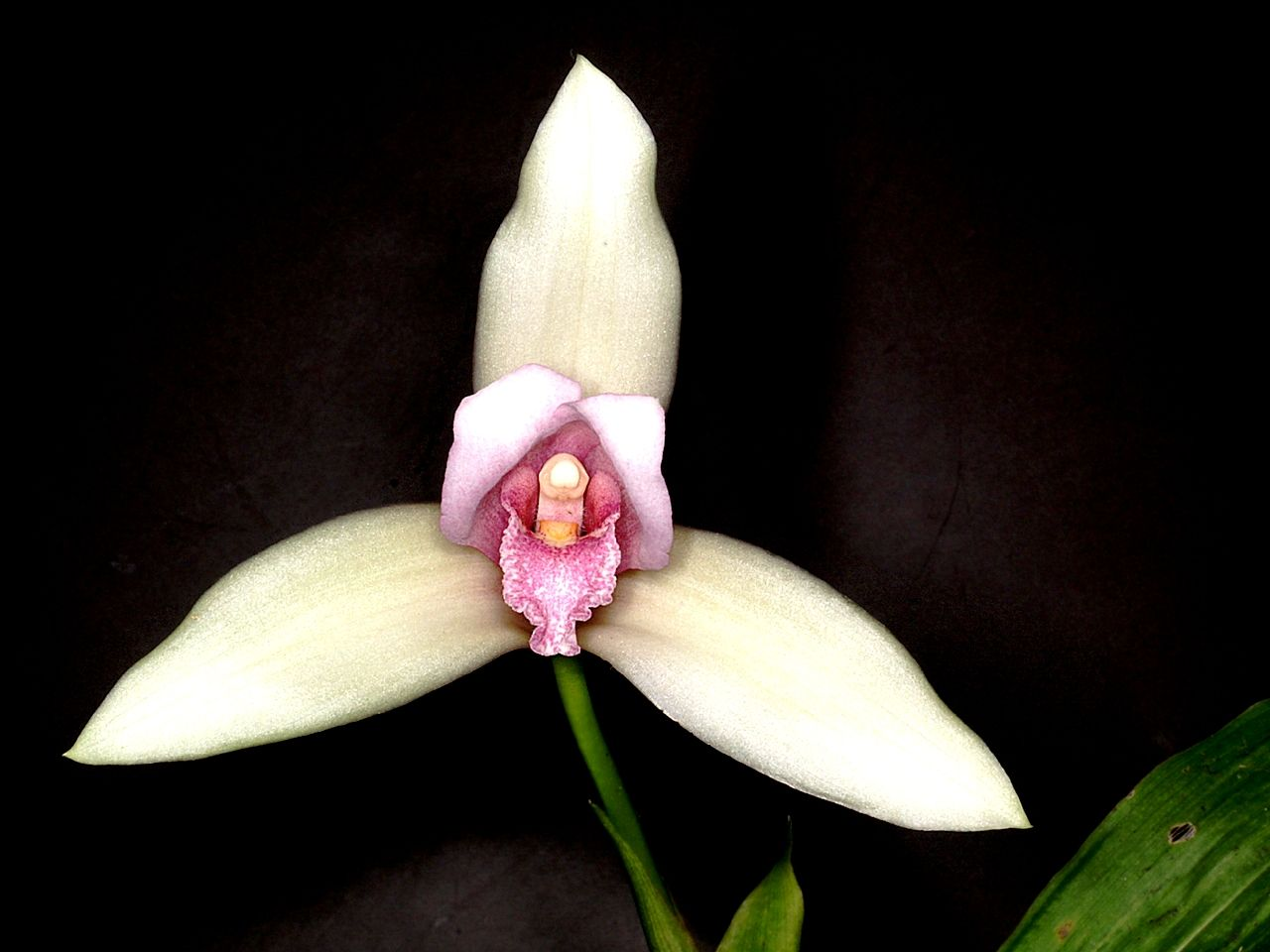
- Lycaste skinneri

Scientific classification
- Kingdom: Plantae
- Clade: Tracheophytes
- Clade: Angiosperms
- Clade: Monocots
- Order: Asparagales
- Family: Orchidaceae
- Subfamily: Epidendroideae
- Tribe: Cymbidieae
- Subtribe: Maxillariinae
- Genus: Lycaste; Lindl., 1843

Species
- See text

Synonyms
- Deppia Raf.; Selbyana Archila; × Lycobyana Archila

= Lycaste =

Genus of orchids

Lycaste, abbreviated as Lyc. in horticultural trade, is a genus of orchids that contains about 30 species with egg-shaped pseudobulbs and thin, plicate (pleated) leaves. According to the American Orchid Society, it was named after a Trojan princess and daughter of Priam from Greek mythology.

== Description ==
Lycaste flowers, like all orchid blooms, have three petals and three sepals. The petals are typically yellow, white, or orange, and the sepals are yellow, orange, green, or reddish brown. The petals and sepals may be marked sparsely or densely with red, reddish purple, purple, or reddish brown spots. The lip (ventral petal) may be very similar to the other two petals, as in Lycaste aromatica or Lycaste brevispatha, or colored quite distinctively, as in several subspecies and varieties of Lycaste macrophylla. Most Lycaste flowers are medium in size, averaging about 5 to 10 cm, but Lycaste schilleriana is 16–18 cm across. Some Lycaste blooms have a unique fragrance - the scent of Lycaste aromatica has been variously described as cinnamon or clove. The blooms of the species Lycaste cochleata, Lycaste consobrina, and Lycaste cruenta also have a pleasant scent.

== Taxonomy ==
The World Checklist of Selected Plant Families, maintained by the Royal Botanic Gardens at Kew, is recognized by the American Orchid Society as the definitive authority on orchid taxonomy. The Checklist currently acknowledges 31 species of Lycaste, 3 natural hybrids, 2 subspecies (and 1 nominate subspecies), and 1 variety. Orchid growers and orchid collectors, who tend to be taxonomic splitters more often than lumpers, recognize additional subspecies and varieties of Lycaste, as well as alba (white) forms of several species.

=== Sections ===
The Lycastes are divided into four sections and two subsections:

- Section Deciduosae - deciduous, that is, they usually lose their leaves during an annual dormant period
  - Subsection Xanthanthae - have yellow to orange blooms; the name comes from xantho (yellow) and anthos (flower)
  - Subsection Paradeciduosae - have pink-marked white blooms; the name comes from para (similar or near) and deciduosae (deciduous)
- Section Longisepalae - has very long sepals
- Section Macrophyllae - keep their leaves during dormancy; the name comes from macro (large) and phyllae (leaves)
- Section Fimbriatae - typically have fringed lips

All but two of the Deciduosae have spines at the apices of their pseudobulbs, that become exposed when the leaves are dropped. The exceptions are the Xanthanthae species Lycaste lasioglossa and the Paradeciduosae species Lycaste tricolor. Both of these species lack spines, and may bloom when leaves are still present.

== List of species by section ==
As of March 2026, Plants of the World Online accepted the following species:

Section	Image	Name	Distribution	Elevation (m)
Section Deciduosae		Lycaste aromatica (Graham ex Hooker) Lindley 1843	Mexico, Guatemala, Nicaragua, Honduras and El Salvador	500–2,000 metres (1,600–6,600 ft)
Section Deciduosae		Lycaste bermudezii (Archila) J.M.H.Shaw 2014	Guatemala	
Section Deciduosae		Lycaste bradeorum Schltr. 1923	Guatemala, El Salvador, Honduras, Nicaragua and Costa Rica	700–1,250 metres (2,300–4,100 ft)
Section Deciduosae		Lycaste campbelli C. Schweinf. 1949	Colombia (Choco, Antioquia)	
Section Deciduosae		Lycaste chaconii (Archila) J.M.H.Shaw 2014	Guatemala	
Section Deciduosae		Lycaste cochleata Lindl. & Paxton 1850-1	Mexico, Guatemala, El Salvador, Honduras and Nicaragua	
Section Deciduosae		Lycaste consobrina Rchb.f 1852	Mexico, Guatemala and Nicaragua	200–1,000 metres (660–3,280 ft)
Section Deciduosae		Lycaste crinita Lindl. 1844	Mexico (Nayarit, Jalisco, Michoacan, Guerrero, and Oaxaca )	300–1,700 metres (980–5,580 ft)
Section Deciduosae		Lycaste cruenta Lindl. 1843	Mexico, Guatemala, Costa Rica and El Salvador	1,800–2,200 metres (5,900–7,200 ft)
Section Deciduosae		Lycaste deppei (Lodd.)Lindley 1843	Mexico (Tamaulipas, Puebla, Vera Cruz, Oaxaca and Chiapas), Guatemala, El Salvador, Honduras and Nicaragua	1,100–1,700 metres (3,600–5,600 ft)
Section Deciduosae		Lycaste lasioglossa Rchb. f. 1872	Guatemala, El Salvador, Honduras	1,400–1,800 metres (4,600–5,900 ft)
Section Deciduosae		Lycaste macrobulbon Lindl. 1850-1	Colombia, Venezuela, Brazil	1,200–2,000 metres (3,900–6,600 ft)
Section Deciduosae		Lycaste angelae Oakley 2008	Costa Rica, Panama	1,000–1,700 metres (3,300–5,600 ft)
Section Deciduosae		Lycaste brevispatha (Klotzsch) Lindl. & Paxton 1852	Costa Rica, Nicaragua, Panama	800–1,800 metres (2,600–5,900 ft)
Section Deciduosae		Lycaste luminosa Oakley 1991	Central America	
Section Deciduosae		Lycaste suaveolens Summerh. 1931	Mexico, Guatemala, Honduras, El Salvador and Nicaragua	600–1,800 metres (2,000–5,900 ft)
Section Deciduosae		Lycaste tricolor Rchb. f. 1863	Costa Rica, Panama	600–1,000 metres (2,000–3,300 ft)
Section Lycaste		Lycaste annakamilae Archila, Szlachetko & Chiron 2015	Guatemala (Purulha, Baja Verapaz,)	1,200 metres (3,900 ft)
Section Lycaste		Lycaste bruncana Bogarín 2007	Costa Rica, Panama	100–400 metres (330–1,310 ft)
Section Lycaste		Lycaste dowiana Endr. & Rchb.f. 1874	Nicaragua, Costa Rica and Panama	700–1,400 metres (2,300–4,600 ft)
Section Lycaste		Lycaste fuscina Oakeley 2008	Venezuela, Ecuador	
Section Lycaste		Lycaste guatemalensis Archila 1999	Guatemala, Honduras, El Salvador	1,000–1,700 metres (3,300–5,600 ft)
Section Lycaste		Lycaste leucantha (Klotsch) Lindl. 1851	Guatemala, Costa Rica, Panama	600–2,000 metres (2,000–6,600 ft)
Section Lycaste		Lycaste macrophylla (Poepp. & Endl.) Lindl. 1842	Costa Rica, Panama, Colombia, Ecuador, Peru, Bolivia and Venezuela	400–2,400 metres (1,300–7,900 ft)
Section Lycaste		Lycaste measuresiana (B.S.Williams) Oakeley 2007	Nicaragua, Costa Rica, Colombia, Venezuela	1,100–1,600 metres (3,600–5,200 ft)
Section Lycaste		Lycaste occulta Oakeley 2007	Venezuela, Colombia, Ecuador	2,600 metres (8,500 ft)
Section Lycaste		Lycaste panamanensis (Fowlie) Archila 2002 publ. 2008	Colombia, Costa Rica, Panamá	1,000 metres (3,300 ft)
Section Lycaste		Lycaste powellii Schltr. 1922	Panama, Colombia	50–800 metres (160–2,620 ft)
Section Lycaste		Lycaste puntarenasensis (Fowlie) Oakeley 2007	Costa Rica, Panama	1,000 metres (3,300 ft)
Section Lycaste		Lycaste sebastianii Archila 2011	Guatemala (Alta Verapaz )	600–700 metres (2,000–2,300 ft)
Section Lycaste		Lycaste viridescens (Oakeley) Oakeley 2007	Peru	
Section Lycaste		Lycaste virginalis Scheidw.) Linden 1888	Mexico, Guatemala, Honduras and El Salvador	1,200–1,800 metres (3,900–5,900 ft)
Section Lycaste		Lycaste xanthocheila (Fowlie) Archila 2002 publ. 2008	Guatemala, Costa Rica	800 metres (2,600 ft)
Section Lycaste		Lycaste xytriophora Linden & Rchb. f. 1872	Costa Rica, Panama, Colombia (El Choco) and Ecuador	600–1,800 metres (2,000–5,900 ft)
Section Lycaste		Lycaste zacapana Archila 2010	Guatemala (Alta Verapaz )	350–400 metres (1,150–1,310 ft)

Natural hybrids

- Lycaste × groganii (Lycaste aromatica × Lycaste deppei)
- Lycaste × michelii (Lycaste cochleata × Lycaste lasioglossa)
- Lycaste × smeeana (Lycaste deppei × Lycaste skinneri)

Hybrids

- Angulocaste (Anguloa × Lycaste)
- Cochlecaste (Cochleanthes × Lycaste)
- Colaste (Colax × Lycaste)
- Lycasteria (Bifrenaria × Lycaste)
- Lycida (Ida × Lycaste)
- Maxillacaste (Lycaste × Maxillaria)
- Zygocaste (Lycaste × Zygopetalum)

A 2002 revision of the Lycaste genus moved many species of the section Fimbriatae to a new genus, Ida. The 34 species of Ida occur in South America and the Caribbean Islands (Ida barringtoniae), while true Lycastes occur mostly in Mexico and Central America. The genus Ida is recognized by the World Checklist of Monocotyledons.
