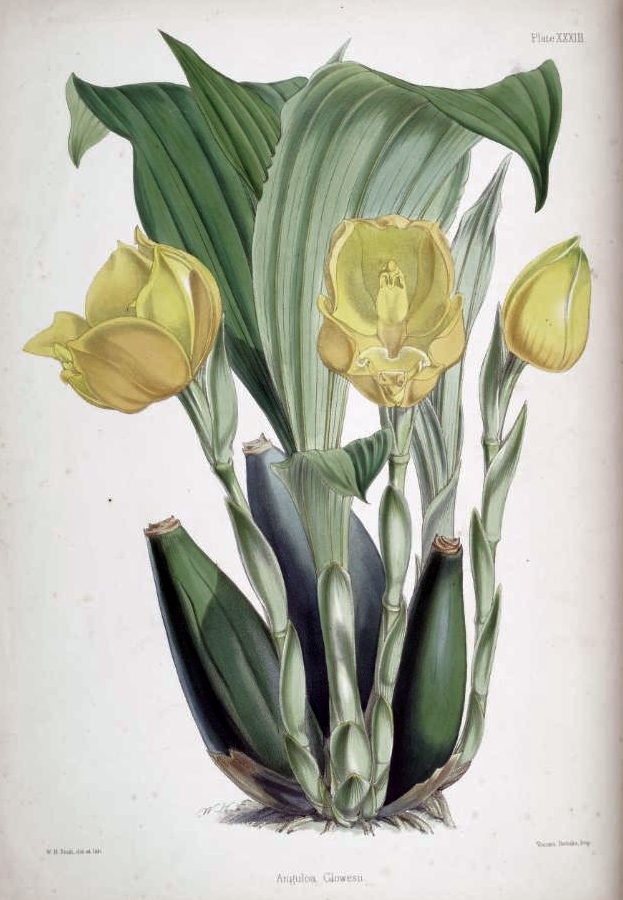

Scientific classification
- Kingdom: Plantae
- Clade: Tracheophytes
- Clade: Angiosperms
- Clade: Monocots
- Order: Asparagales
- Family: Orchidaceae
- Subfamily: Epidendroideae
- Genus: Anguloa
- Species: A. clowesii

Binomial name
- Anguloa clowesii Lindl. (1844)

Synonyms
- Anguloa clowesii var. aurea A.DC. ex Oakeley (1999)

= Anguloa clowesii =

Species of orchid

Anguloa clowesii is a species of orchid.

== Gallery ==

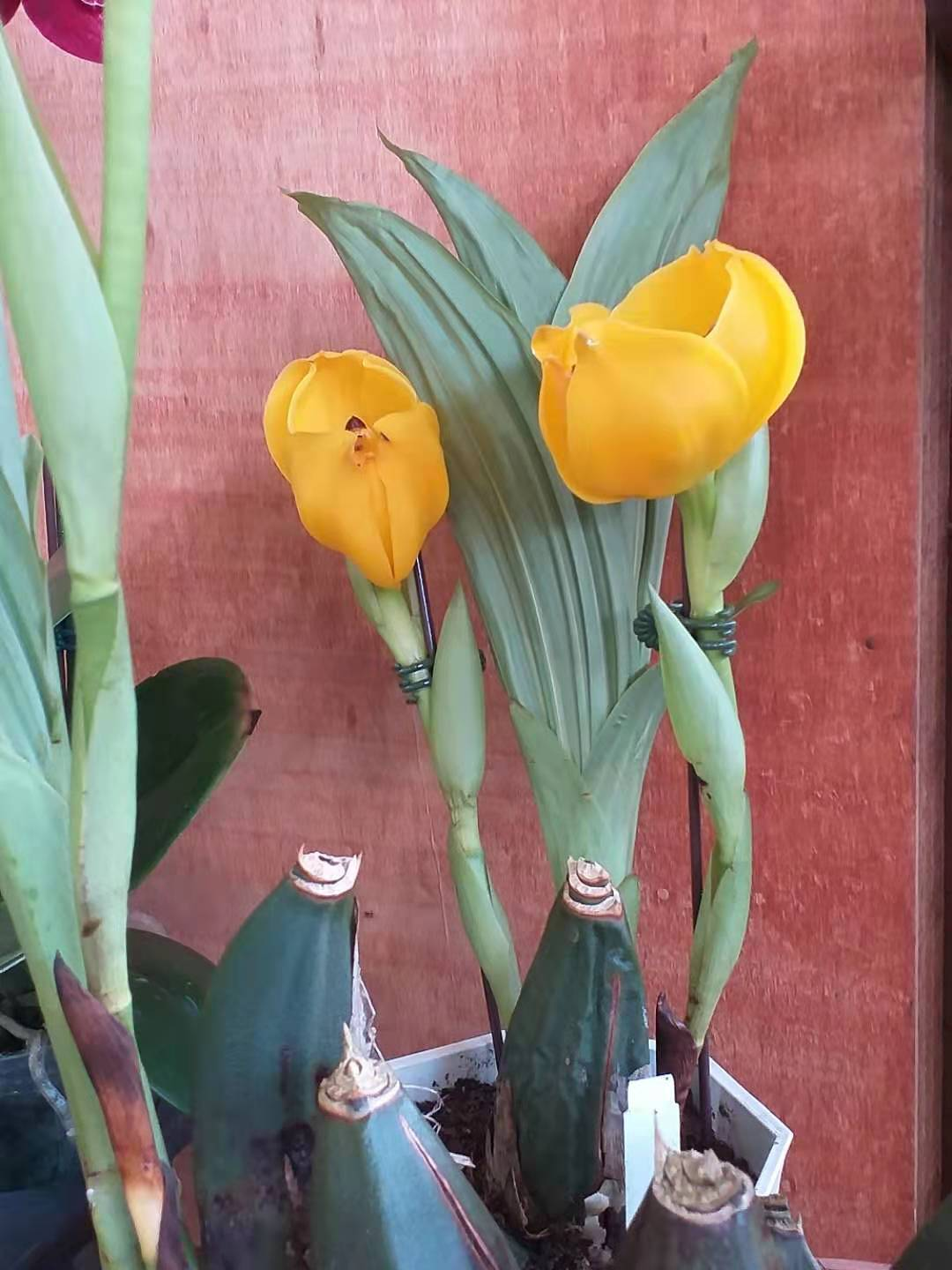
