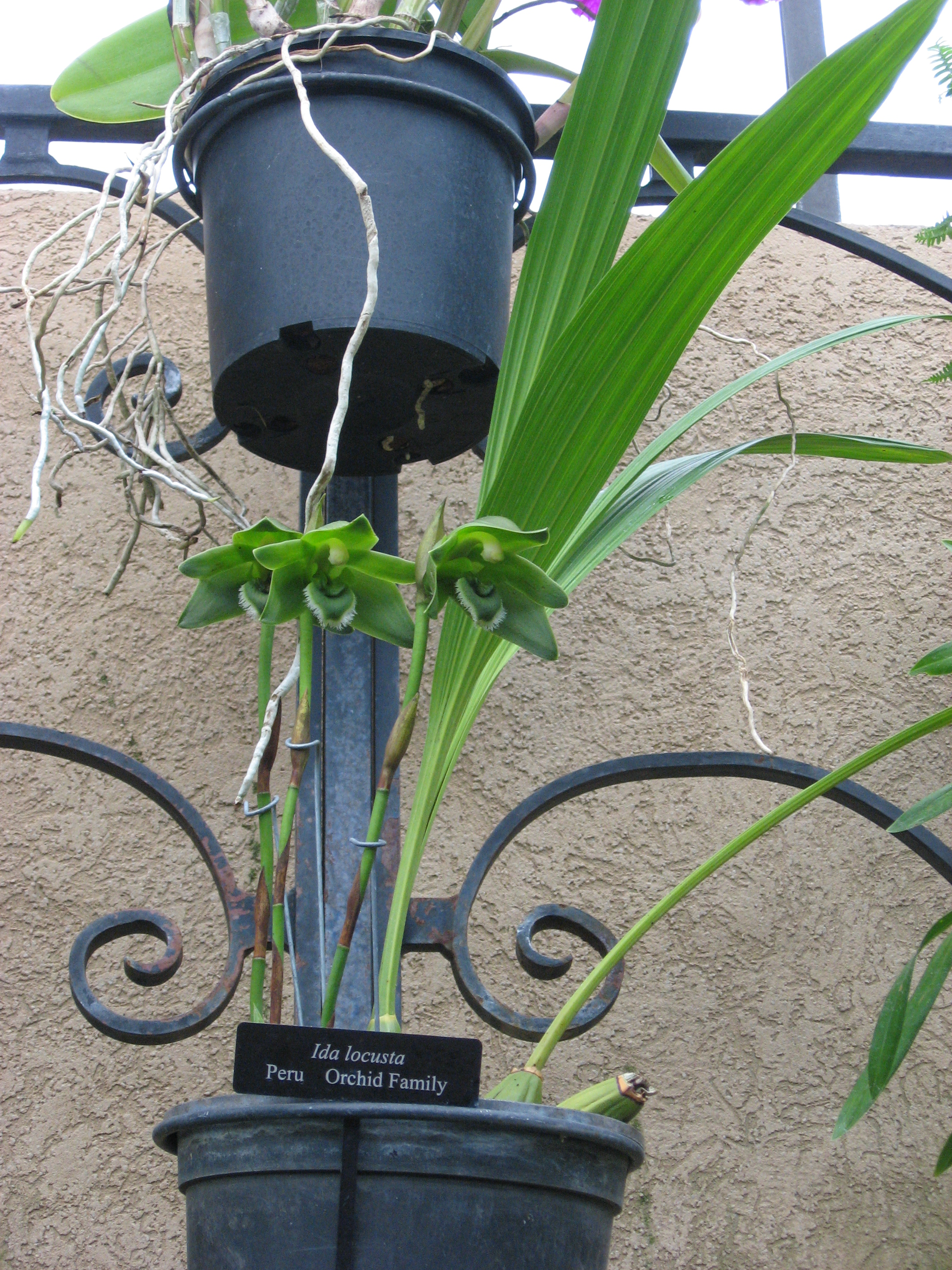

Scientific classification
- Kingdom: Plantae
- Clade: Tracheophytes
- Clade: Angiosperms
- Clade: Monocots
- Order: Asparagales
- Family: Orchidaceae
- Subfamily: Epidendroideae
- Genus: Ida
- Species: I. locusta

Binomial name
- Ida locusta (Rchb.f.) A.Ryan & Oakeley

Synonyms
- Ida locusta var. minor Oakeley; Lycaste locusta Rchb.f.; Sudamerlycaste locusta (Rchb.f.) Archila

= Ida locusta =

Species of plant

Ida locusta, synonyms including Sudamerlycaste locusta, is a species of flowering plant in the family Orchidaceae.

== Description ==
Ida locusta is a large orchid with night-blooming flowers that smell of apples. The erect inflorescence is 7 inches (18 cm) long with a single waxy, green flower that lasts 2-4 weeks. Flowers are 4.5 inches (11 cm) across.

It is native to Peru and is found on sunny embankments at altitudes between 6,560–9,850 feet (2,000–3,000 m).
