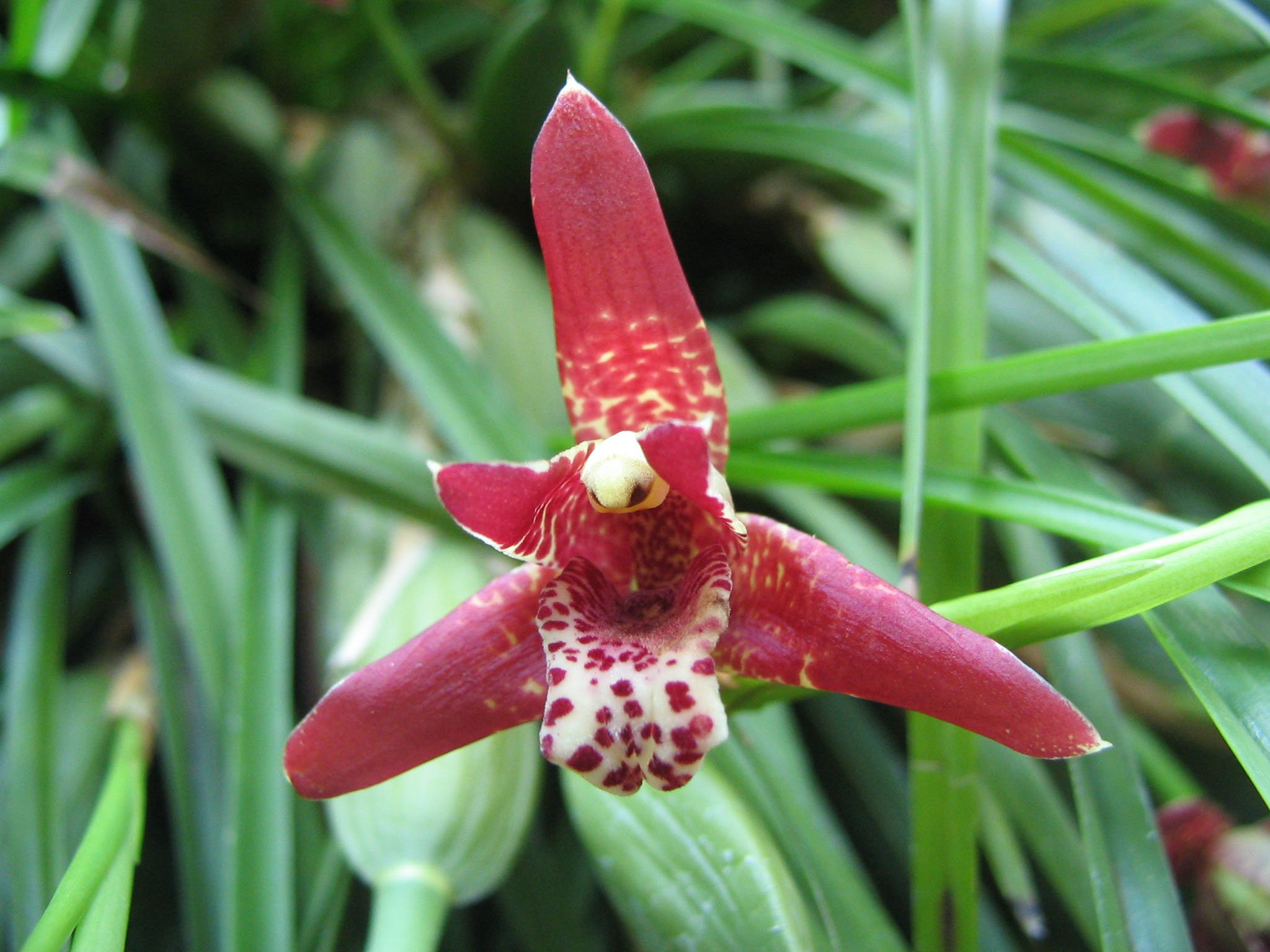
- Coconut pie orchid (Maxillaria tenuifolia)

Scientific classification
- Kingdom: Plantae
- Clade: Tracheophytes
- Clade: Angiosperms
- Clade: Monocots
- Order: Asparagales
- Family: Orchidaceae
- Subfamily: Epidendroideae
- Tribe: Cymbidieae
- Subtribe: Maxillariinae
- Genus: Maxillaria; Ruiz & Pavon

Type species
- Maxillaria platypetala Ruiz & Pavon (1794)

Species
- Many, see list of Maxillaria species

Synonyms
- List: Adamanthus Szlach.; Anthosiphon Schltr.; Aucellia Szlach. & Sitko; Bolbidium (Lindl.) Lindl.; Brasiliorchis R.B.Singer, S.Koehler & Carnevali; Calawaya Szlach. & Sitko; Camaridium Lindl.; Chaseopsis Szlach. & Sitko; Chelyella Szlach. & Sitko; Christensonella Szlach., Mytnik, Górniak & Smiszek; Chrysocycnis Linden & Rchb.f.; Cryptocentrum Benth.; Cyrtidiorchis Rauschert; Cyrtidium Schltr.; Cyrtoglottis Schltr.; Dicrypta Lindl.; Heterotaxis Lindl.; Hoehnella Szlach. & Sitko; Hylaeorchis Carnevali & G.A.Romero; Inti M.A.Blanco; Laricorchis Szlach.; Mapinguari Carnevali & R.B.Singer; Marsupiaria Hoehne; Maxillariella M.A.Blanco & Carnevali; Menadena Raf.; Mormolyca Fenzl; Neo-urbania Fawc. & Rendle; Nitidobulbon Ojeda, Carnevali & G.A.Romero; Ornithidium Salisb. ex R.Br.; Pittierella Schltr.; Pityphyllum Schltr.; Pseudocymbidium Szlach. & Sitko; Pseudomaxillaria Hoehne; Psittacoglossum Lex.; Rhetinantha M.A.Blanco; Sauvetrea Szlach.; Sepalosaccus Schltr.; Siagonanthus Poepp. & Endl.; Trigonidium Lindl.; Vazquezella Szlach. & Sitko; Viracocha Szlach. & Sitko; Xanthoxerampellia Szlach. & Sitko

= Maxillaria =

Genus of neotropical tiger orchids

Maxillaria, abbreviated as Max in the horticultural trade, is a large genus of orchids (family Orchidaceae). This is a diverse genus, with very different morphological forms. Their characteristics can vary widely. They are commonly called spider orchids, flame orchids or tiger orchids. Their scientific name is derived from the Latin word maxilla, meaning jawbone, reflecting on the column and the base of the lip of some species, that may evoke a protruding jaw.

== Description ==
Their pseudobulbs are round or oblong and each carry one or two lanceolate leaves. Some grow close together in a clustered manner on a short rhizome, while in other species the pseudobulbs keep some distance on an elongate rhizome. This rhizome is clothed in a somewhat transparent, silvery-gray velamen.

The flowers grow solitary on short stalks, called scapes, from the base of the pseudobulb. Most are small to very small, but some species carry large, showy flowers. The flowers are never longer than the leaves. Their free petals and sepals have a typically curved and adnate labellum with three inconspicuous lobes. Or the lip may have a distinct callus on the disc ( = central part of the lip from which the lobes radiate). The papillae (= small warts like glands) and the trichomes of the lip show great diversity. The most common form for the papillae is the conical form with rounded or pointed tips.

== Taxonomy ==
The genus was established by Hipólito Ruiz López and José Antonio Pavón Jiménez in 1794. In 2007, a molecular phylogenetic study found that many of the genera then accepted in the subtribe Maxillariinae (including Anthosiphon, Cryptocentrum, Chrysocycnis, Cyrtidiorchis, Mormolyca, Pityphyllum, and Trigonidium) were embedded within Maxillaria as then circumscribed, rendering that genus polyphyletic. The authors suggested recognizing 17 separate genera, including in addition Brasilorchis, Camaridium, Christensonella, Heterotaxis, Inti, Mapinguari, Maxillariella, Nitobulbon, Ornithidium, Rhetinantha and Sauvetrea. Other sources have preferred to take a more conservative approach, treating all the genera within an enlarged Maxillaria. For example, as of December 2023, Plants of the World Online listed over 40 other genus names as synonyms of Maxillaria.

== Distribution and ecology ==
Maxillaria species are distributed in the rainforest at sea level to elevations of 3,500 m, in Latin America from central Mexico to Bolivia, as well as in the West Indies. This is an indication for the different temperature requirements, from warm growing to cold growing, within the genus.

They are mostly epiphytes, rather large in size, but some are terrestrials or even lithophytes (such as M. rupestris).

== Cultivation ==
Maxillaria is not one of the popular genera among growers. Only a few species grow big, showy flowers. But some species are nevertheless sought by collectors, mostly for the fragrance of their blossoms, such as Maxillaria tenuifolia.
