= San Roque de Cumbaza =

- Town
- Location within Peru
- Coordinates: 6°23′7″S 76°26′15″W
- Country: Peru
- Region: San Martín
- Province: Lamas
- District: San Roque de Cumbaza

Government
  - Mayor: Angel Aguilar Castillo
- Elevation: 830 m (2,720 ft)

Population (2007)
  - Total: 1,508

San Roque de Cumbaza (also known as San Roque) is a town in the San Martín Region of Peru, approximately a 45-minute drive northwest of the city of Tarapoto. Located in the Amazon rainforest, San Roque is home to a small community of people who mainly work in agriculture. Near the headwaters of the Cumbaza river, San Roque borders the Cordillera Escalera regional conservation area, a small mountain range in the low-jungle. The flora and fauna surrounding the town attract Tarapotinos each weekend to swim and relax alongside the river.

== History ==
In 1875, a family from Lamas, Peru named the town of San Roque after the Catholic Saint, Saint Roch. While the town has officially existed since the mid-eighteenth century, traces of earlier human presence are evident by the discovery of stone axes. Early inhabitants were drawn to the area due to the abundance of fish and local wildlife that find natural refuge in the mountains of the Cordillera Escalera. First peoples included the Tananta and the Amasifuen. During the 20th century, several Mestizo families emigrated from the city of Lamas and began to farm in the area. Many of these families continue to live in San Roque and have been fundamental in establishing the present-day town.

The actual site of the town was originally built along the banks of the river, known as the Pampa. However, in 1910 a devastating flood swept through San Roque and claimed many lives, convincing the remaining San Roquíños to relocate the town higher up the mountain. The Pampa site now serves as a recreational area (see Tourism below).

In 1965, San Roque de Cumbaza District became a municipal district, with the town of San Roque as its capital. The jurisdictional boundaries of the district also include the towns of Auacaloma, Chiricyacu, Aviación, and Chunchiwi. The most recent census (2007) noted 1508 people living inside the district.

== Geography ==
=== Altitude ===
San Roque is located 830m above sea level.

=== Climate ===
San Roque experiences an average temperature of 22 °C; daytime highs may reach 30 °C, but evenings are typically cooler when temperatures range between 15 and 20 °C.

Annual precipitation for the area is 841 mm; the main rainy season occurs from January to mid-March, but rain showers should be expected throughout the year.

=== Flora ===
==== Orchids ====
The San Martín Region in general is known for its orchids. For example, the capital of the region, Moyobamba, is also known as the city of orchids. In San Roque you can find varieties of orchids such as Scuticaria salesiana, Oncidium heterantha, and Sobralia setigera, among others.

==== Medicinal plants ====
Traditional medicines are used by some San Roquiños to treat a variety of ailments, ranging from the common cold to diabetes. Some of these local medicinal plants include achicoris, ojé (Ficus insipida), ortiga, hierba mora, and pamporégano.

=== Fauna ===
Due to the small human population and the nearby conservation area, San Roque and its surrounding area are home to a wide variety of tropical butterflies, birds, reptiles and mammals. These include but are not limited to:

==== Butterflies ====
Heliconius, parides, caligo, morpho, and heraclides.

==== Birds ====
Myiozetetes similis, Thraupis episcopus, Nyctibius spp., Ortalis guttata, Elanoides forficatus, Colaptes punctigula, Aburria aburri, Crypturellus soui, Crotophaga ani, Ortalis guttata, and Cacicus cela.

==== Reptiles ====
Esmeralda boa, coral snake, rainbow boa, and iguana iguana.

==== Mammals ====
Chironectes minimus, Didelphis marsupialis, Dasypus novemcinctus, Alouatta seniculus, Nasua nasua, and Potos flavus.

== Culture ==
=== Religion ===
Catholicism was the dominant religion in the town of San Roque between the mid-nineteenth century until 1930, when the arrival of the Adventist and Evangelical church diversified local religion. It is also home to Huamanwasi Ashram, a center of traditional medicine which also teaches yoga.

=== Festivals and events ===
San Roque celebrates Patron Saint's Day every July 27 to the 31st. The community hosts cultural activities and sporting events, but does not include many religious observances.

Since 2010, a private company has held an annual marathon in early November, which begins and finishes in San Roque. The event attracts runners from around Peru, and San Roquiños offer a farmer's market, organize la Festival de la PANI, and sell food and drinks.

=== Food and drink ===
Most San Roquiños are agriculturists; meals in San Roque are often very filling, and mainly consist of protein and carbohydrates. Typical dishes in San Roque include juane, inchicapi, timbuchi de shitari, plantanapi, cutacho, tacacho, and uchucuta.

Classic selva (jungle) drinks include chicha de maiz, masato, chuchuhuasi, indanachado, uvachado, and vino de uva, a locally grown wine also known as borgoño.

Several families offer lunch and dinner at their in-home restaurants, while local bodegas sell fruit, vegetables, and other staples such as rice and bread.

=== Art ===
San Roque de Cumbaza is home to the Sachaqa Centro de Arte, an art center which hosts both Peruvian artists and artists from abroad through their residency program.

== Economy ==
=== Agriculture ===
San Roque's economy depends predominately on agriculture. Campensiños (farmers) produce mainly coco, coffee, yucca, plantains, peanuts, rice and corn in their chacras (fields). Other crops include a variety of tropical fruits, vegetables, and wild herbs.

=== Tourism ===
Over the past several years, San Roque has been involved in two regional tourism projects, and has a burgeoning cultural tourism and ecotourism sector.

Local guides, small restaurants, and municipal and private operators offer tourism and hospitality services in San Roque.

==== The Pampa ====
The original town site, the Pampa, is now San Roque's main recreational area, receiving the majority of tourists’ attention. Stretching for a kilometer along the Rio de Cumbaza, the Pampa includes a soccer field, la PANI, a playground, and the municipal garden, bungalows, and hostel. Throughout this area, the community has situated benches and tiny palm huts among the trees for visitors to rest beside the river. Finally, the farthest end of the Pampa offers la Mazona, a jumping platform 7 meters above a natural pool in the river 8 meters deep. Beyond this point is la Isla de Amor, an island in the river steeped in local legend, and the tiny waterfall Mishquiyacu (pronounced Mish-ki-yeah-ku) meaning “rich waters.”

==== Above and beyond San Roque ====
Located further up the mountain slopes, the community has built two miradores, wooden lookout towers that offer a vista of the Cordillera Escalera, the town of Chiricyacu, and even the lights of Tarapoto and Lamas. The larger of the two lookouts has a second story, allowing guided groups to camp overnight along the filo (ridge). Swallow-tailed kites and black vultures are often seen riding the air swells around the miradores.

The trails that lead to the miradores continue to Añaquihui (pronounced an-a-ki-wui), a clear mountain stream, as well as Toroyacu, a 100-meter waterfall deep in the jungle. Guides offer trekking to both sites and are mandatory; Añaquihui is located in the reserve and cared for by the NAPO organization, while Toroyacu is a sacred place cared for by the people of Chiricyacu. The former is a half-day trip hike round trip, while the latter is an overnight excursion. Also of note are two large, natural stone “roads” known as Atunrumi de Yuractio and Atunrumi Mayor, which act as waterways en route to Toroyacu.

Lastly, guides offer hikes from San Roque to the surrounding native communities, where local hosts offer food, stories, and cultural workshops such as ceramic making.

== Infrastructure ==
=== Education ===
There is one school in San Roque, Educational Institute N• 0303, which provides primary education. The school's youth environmental brigade offers guided tours of la PANI.

=== Healthcare ===
The local clinic (La Posta Sanitaria) offers basic first aid. People with serious healthcare concerns are recommended to go to Tarapoto.

=== Transportation ===
San Roque is accessible from Tarapoto via a well-travelled but unpaved road. Public transportation is available through colectivos (share taxis), which cost about 6 Peruvian soles each way. The colectivos depart Tarapoto from the district of Morales roughly every two hours from 6 a.m. until 5 p.m.

Returning to Tarapoto, colectivos leave the upper plaza beginning at 4:30 a.m. and continue to depart every two hours until 4:30 p.m.

The road forms a loop, with Tarapoto and San Roque at opposite points. The western half of the loop passes through Auacaloma, while the eastern half runs through San Pedro, with access to San Antonio. Both routes are used by the colectivas.

An armed community watch guards the entrance of the road and will usually request a donation upon entry; it is not mandatory, but 1 Peruvian sol is a recommended contribution.
