= Larreategui =

Larreategui is a Basque surname that may refer to people called Larreátegui or Reátegui.

== Larreátegui ==
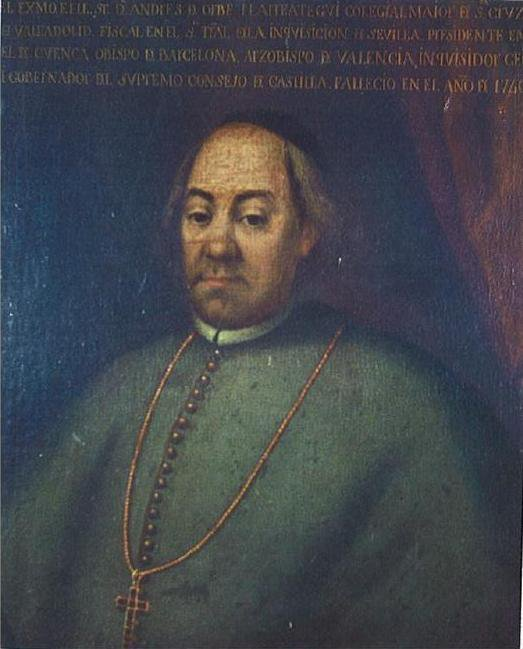
Andrés de Orbe y Larreategui

- Mauro de Larreátegui y Colón, O.S.B., Archbishop of Guatemala (1703–1711).
- Andrés de Orbe y Larreategui, Archbishop of Barcelona (1720–1725), Archbishop of Valencia (1725–1736), Grand Inquisitor of Spain (1733–1740).
- José Dionisio Larreátegui, botanist, published about flora from Mexico since late 18th century.

== Reátegui ==
The surname Reátegui is widely spread in the northern Peruvian Amazon region, particularly around Iquitos, Tarapoto, Moyobamba, Rioja, and Lamas. The surname is derived from the Basque Larreategui. The first Reátegui in Peru was Pedro de Larreategui y Gaviria, founder of the city of Lamas in 1656. One of his descendants, Félix de la Rosa Reátegui y Gaviria, founded Santo Toribio de la Nueva Rioja on 22 September 1782, today's town of Rioja in San Martin Region of Peru.

=== List of people with paternal surname Reátegui ===
- Reategui, Anthony; professional poker player from Chandler, Arizona, USA.
- Reategui Collazos, Eduardo; current mayor of Santa Rosa District, Rodríguez de Mendoza, Amazonas Region, Peru.
- Reátegui Rosselló, Javier Edmundo; (born 1944), Peruvian economist and politician, ex secretary general of the political party Perú Posible, representative for Peru in the Andean Community of Nations.
- Reátegui, Martín; player of the Peruvian football club Hijos de Acosvinchos, Lima since 2010.
- Reategui Rengifo, Narciso; current mayor of Teniente Cesar Lopez Rojas District, Alto Amazonas Province, Loreto Region, Peru.
- Reátegui Flores, Rolando; (born 1959), Peruvian entrepreneur; Fujimorist politician and a member of the Peruvian Congress (2000–2001, 2011–2016).
- Reátegui, Sandra; Gold Medal winner for both 100 m and 200 m sprint at the 1996 South American Youth Championships in Athletics and Bronze for 200 m sprint at the 1998 South American Junior Championships in Athletics
- Reátegui Chumbe, Segundo Roger; current mayor of Barranquita District, Lamas Province, San Martin Region, Peru.
- Reátegui Trigoso, Carlos E.; Peruvian politician, member of the Peruvian Congress (1992–1995, 1995–2000).

=== List of people with maternal surname Reátegui ===
- General Bustamante Reátegui, Víctor; Commander-in-Chief of the Peruvian Army in 2002.
- Dr. Chávez Reátegui, Wilson; Rector of the Universidad Nacional Mayor de San Marcos (1990–1995), Lima, Peru.
- Del Castillo Reátegui, Víctor Mardonio; (born 1958), Peruvian politician, member of the political party APRA, mayor of Moyobamba (2003–2006).
- Maldonado Reátegui, Arturo; Peruvian politician, member of the Peruvian congress (2001–2006).
- Rivadeneyra Reátegui, Robinson; (born 1960), Peruvian politician; member of the Peruvian congress (2000–2001) and president of the government of Loreto Region (2003–2006).
- Saldaña Reátegui, Miguel Ángel; current mayor of Comas District, Lima, Peru.

=== In fiction ===
- Julio Reategui, character in Mario Vargas Llosa's novel The Green House

== See also ==
- Retegui
