= Zapatero (disambiguation) =

José Luis Rodríguez Zapatero (born 1960) is a former Prime Minister of Spain.

Zapatero may also refer to:

- Zapatero (surname)
- Zapatero District, Peru
- Jorge Abrego or El Zapatero
- "Zapatero", a track by Manolo García from Arena en los Bolsillos
- "El Zapatero", a song by Luis Vargas

== See also ==
- Zapatera (disambiguation)
