= Shanao =

Shanao may refer to:

- Shanao (city), capital of the Shanao District
- Shanao District, Peru
- Takuya Sugi, a Japanese professional wrestler
- Minamoto no Yoshitsune, who was named Shanao before reaching manhood
