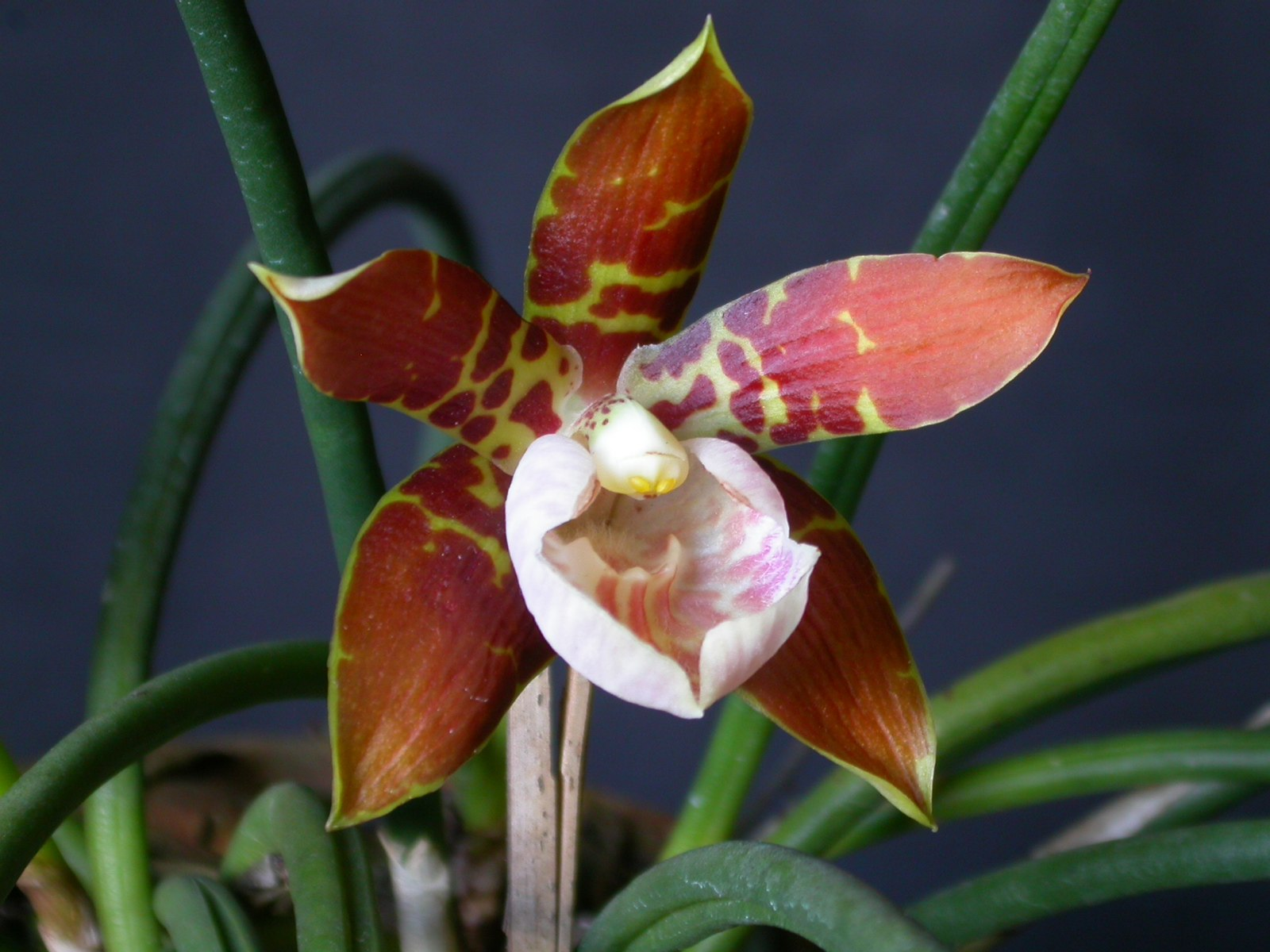
- Flower of Scuticaria hadwenii

Scientific classification
- Kingdom: Plantae
- Clade: Tracheophytes
- Clade: Angiosperms
- Clade: Monocots
- Order: Asparagales
- Family: Orchidaceae
- Subfamily: Epidendroideae
- Genus: Scuticaria
- Species: S. hadwenii

Binomial name
- Scuticaria hadwenii (Lindl.) Planch.

Synonyms
- Bifrenaria hadwenii Lindl. (basionym)

= Scuticaria hadwenii =

Species of orchid

Scuticaria hadwenii is a species of orchid occurring from Guyana to Brazil. It is closely related to Bifrenaria.
