= Tabalosos District =

Coordinates: 6.3885°S 76.6344°W

Tabalosos
- District
- Interactive map of Tabalosos
- Country: Peru
- Region: San Martín
- Province: Lamas
- Founded: November 25, 1876
- Capital: Tabalosos

Government
  - Mayor: Juan Manuel Pisco Pizango

Area
  - Total: 485.25 km^{2} (187.36 sq mi)
- Elevation: 600 m (2,000 ft)

Population (2005 census)
  - Total: 12,427
  - Density: 25.609/km^{2} (66.328/sq mi)
- Time zone: UTC-5 (PET)
- UBIGEO: 220510

Tabalosos District is one of eleven districts of the province Lamas in Peru.

== Climate ==
Climate data for Tabalosos, elevation 486 m (1,594 ft), (1991–2020)
Month	Jan	Feb	Mar	Apr	May	Jun	Jul	Aug	Sep	Oct	Nov	Dec	Year
Mean daily maximum °C (°F)	31.4 (88.5)	30.9 (87.6)	30.5 (86.9)	30.3 (86.5)	30.3 (86.5)	30.1 (86.2)	30.3 (86.5)	31.2 (88.2)	31.5 (88.7)	31.6 (88.9)	31.6 (88.9)	31.4 (88.5)	30.9 (87.7)
Mean daily minimum °C (°F)	21.0 (69.8)	21.0 (69.8)	20.8 (69.4)	20.5 (68.9)	20.3 (68.5)	19.6 (67.3)	19.0 (66.2)	19.2 (66.6)	19.6 (67.3)	20.4 (68.7)	21.0 (69.8)	21.1 (70.0)	20.3 (68.5)
Average precipitation mm (inches)	95.3 (3.75)	121.1 (4.77)	156.6 (6.17)	151.6 (5.97)	120.9 (4.76)	87.3 (3.44)	81.6 (3.21)	70.4 (2.77)	115.3 (4.54)	124.5 (4.90)	118.3 (4.66)	101.2 (3.98)	1,344.1 (52.92)
Source: National Meteorology and Hydrology Service of Peru
