= Rumisapa District =

Coordinates: 6.4506°S 76.4724°W

Rumisapa
- District
- Interactive map of Rumisapa
- Country: Peru
- Region: San Martín
- Province: Lamas
- Founded: May 8, 1936
- Capital: Rumisapa

Government
  - Mayor: Enrrique Torres Montilla

Area
  - Total: 39.19 km^{2} (15.13 sq mi)
- Elevation: 400 m (1,300 ft)

Population (2005 census)
  - Total: 2,364
  - Density: 60.32/km^{2} (156.2/sq mi)
- Time zone: UTC-5 (PET)
- UBIGEO: 220507

Rumisapa District is one of eleven districts of the province Lamas in Peru.
