= Caynarachi District =

Coordinates: 6.3291°S 76.2852°W

Caynarachi
- District
- Interactive map of Caynarachi
- Country: Peru
- Region: San Martín
- Province: Lamas
- Founded: November 25, 1876
- Capital: Shanusi

Government
  - Mayor: Eulogio Barriga Huansi

Area
  - Total: 1,679.08 km^{2} (648.30 sq mi)
- Elevation: 210 m (690 ft)

Population (2005 census)
  - Total: 6,800
  - Density: 4.0/km^{2} (10/sq mi)
- Time zone: UTC-5 (PET)
- UBIGEO: 220504

Caynarachi District is one of eleven districts of the province Lamas in Peru.

== Climate ==
Climate data for Pongo de Caynarachi, Caynarachi, elevation 187 m (614 ft), (1991–2020)
Month	Jan	Feb	Mar	Apr	May	Jun	Jul	Aug	Sep	Oct	Nov	Dec	Year
Mean daily maximum °C (°F)	31.5 (88.7)	31.3 (88.3)	31.0 (87.8)	31.0 (87.8)	31.0 (87.8)	30.8 (87.4)	31.0 (87.8)	32.3 (90.1)	32.6 (90.7)	32.3 (90.1)	31.9 (89.4)	31.6 (88.9)	31.5 (88.7)
Mean daily minimum °C (°F)	22.3 (72.1)	22.4 (72.3)	22.3 (72.1)	22.1 (71.8)	21.9 (71.4)	21.4 (70.5)	20.9 (69.6)	21.1 (70.0)	21.5 (70.7)	22.2 (72.0)	22.5 (72.5)	22.4 (72.3)	21.9 (71.4)
Average precipitation mm (inches)	319.3 (12.57)	363.8 (14.32)	409.2 (16.11)	327.1 (12.88)	291.9 (11.49)	198.4 (7.81)	142.8 (5.62)	133.4 (5.25)	185.4 (7.30)	297.0 (11.69)	343.7 (13.53)	370.0 (14.57)	3,382 (133.14)
Source: National Meteorology and Hydrology Service of Peru
