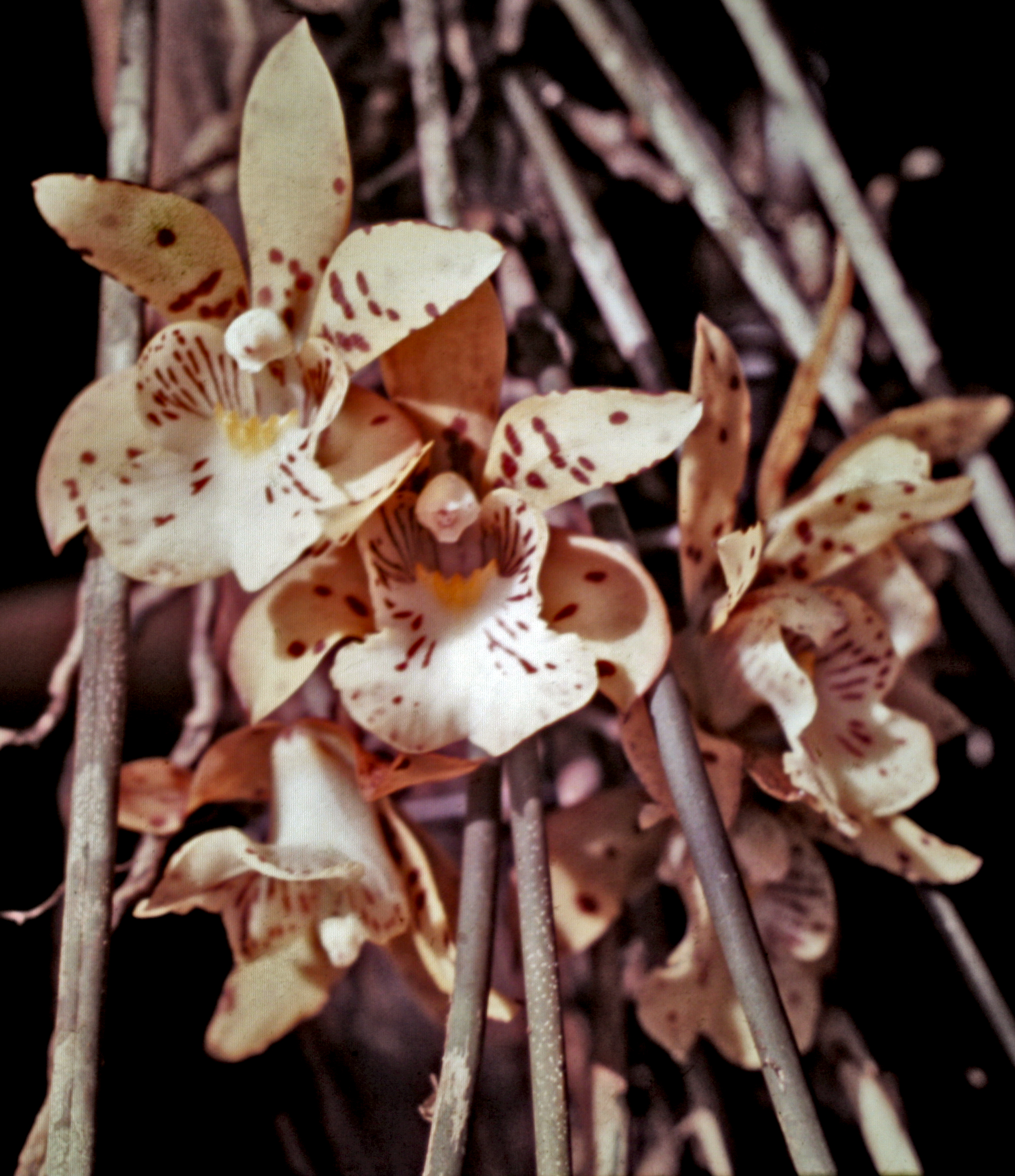
- Flower of Scuticaria steelei

Scientific classification
- Kingdom: Plantae
- Clade: Tracheophytes
- Clade: Angiosperms
- Clade: Monocots
- Order: Asparagales
- Family: Orchidaceae
- Subfamily: Epidendroideae
- Genus: Scuticaria
- Species: S. steelei

Binomial name
- Scuticaria steelei (Hook.) Lindl.

Synonyms
- Bifrenaria steelei (Hook.) Meneguzzo & M.W.Chase; Maxillaria steelei Hook. (basionym); Maxillaria flabellifera Lindl.; Scuticaria keyseriana auct.

= Scuticaria steelei =

Species of orchid

Scuticaria steelei is a species of orchid native to southern tropical America. It is the type species of the genus Scuticaria. In 2024, Meneguzzo and M.W.Chase transferred the species to the genus Bifrenaria.
