= Retegui =

- Pronunciation: pronounced [reteɡi]

Origin
- Origin: Basque
- Meaning: burnt place, cooking center or too burnt, too cooked
- Region of origin: Basque County

Other names
- Variant form: Retegi

Retegui or Retegi is a surname. The Spanish surname Retegui could be toponymic or a sobriquet in origin. Spelling variations of this family name include: Erretegui, Retegi, Reategui. Erretegi comes from the Basque erre meaning to burn, to smoke, to bake, to cook and the suffix -tegi meaning residence, center, edge, border, bank or from the suffix -egi used to form the excessive form of adjectives.

== People ==
People with the name include:

- Carlos Retegui, Argentine field hockey manager
- Mateo Retegui, Argentine-Italian footballer
- Micaela Retegui, Argentine field hockey player
- Julián Retegi (born Retegui Barbería), Spanish player of Basque pelota

== See also ==
- Larreategui
