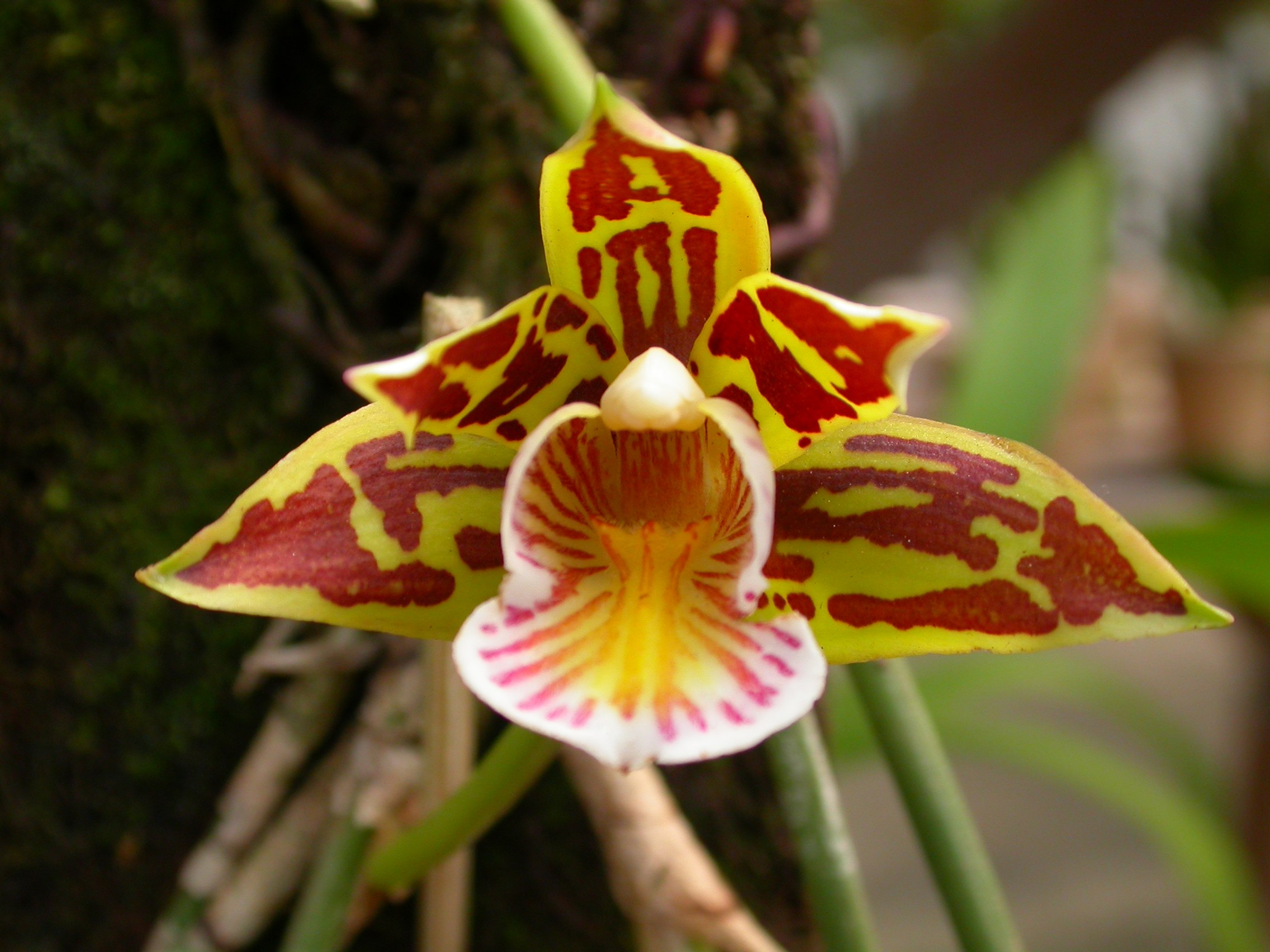
- Flower of Scuticaria novaesii

Scientific classification
- Kingdom: Plantae
- Clade: Tracheophytes
- Clade: Angiosperms
- Clade: Monocots
- Order: Asparagales
- Family: Orchidaceae
- Subfamily: Epidendroideae
- Genus: Scuticaria
- Species: S. novaesii

Binomial name
- Scuticaria novaesii F.Barros & Cath.

Synonyms
- Scuticaria novaesiae F.Barros & Cath; Bifrenaria novaesiae (F.Barros & Cath.) Meneguzzo & M.W.Chase

= Scuticaria novaesii =

Species of orchid

Scuticaria novaesii is a species of orchid endemic to Brazil (Espírito Santo). In 2024, Meneguzzo and M.W.Chase transferred the species to the genus Bifrenaria, and corrected the specific epithet to novaesiae per the International Code of Nomenclature for algae, fungi, and plants.
