= Zapatera (disambiguation) =

Zapatera is a volcano in southern Nicaragua, which forms Zapatera Island in Lake Nicaragua.

Zapatera may also refer to:

- Zapatera (archaeological site)
- Zapatera Island
- Zapatera Archipelago

== See also ==
- Zapatero (disambiguation)
