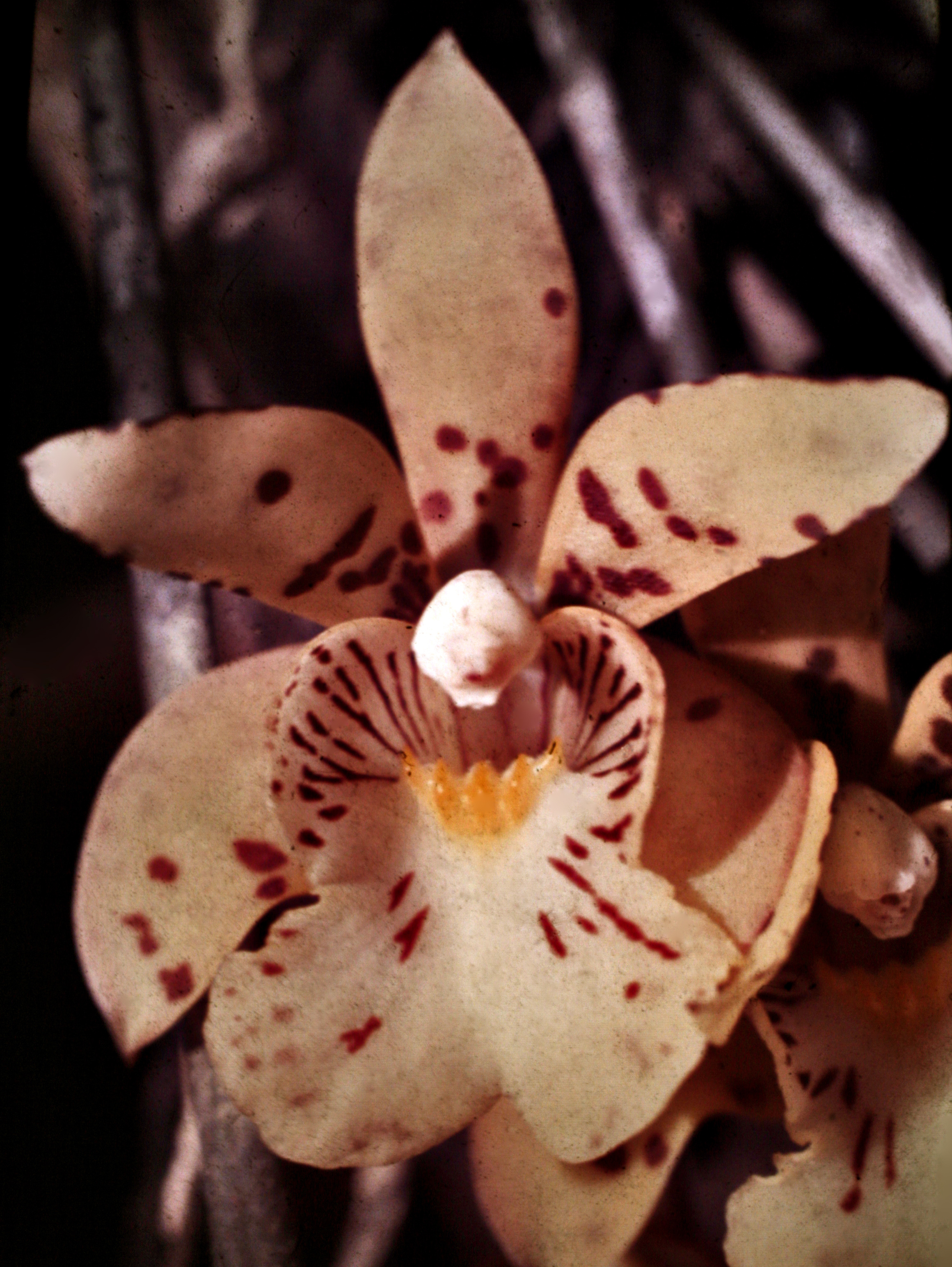
- Scuticaria steelei

Scientific classification
- Kingdom: Plantae
- Clade: Tracheophytes
- Clade: Angiosperms
- Clade: Monocots
- Order: Asparagales
- Family: Orchidaceae
- Subfamily: Epidendroideae
- Tribe: Cymbidieae
- Subtribe: Maxillariinae
- Genus: Scuticaria; Lindl.

Type species
- Scuticaria steelei Hook.

Species
- Scuticaria bahiensis; Scuticaria bueraremensis; Scuticaria guainiana; Scuticaria hadwenii; Scuticaria irwiniana; Scuticaria itirapinensis; Scuticaria kautskyi; Scuticaria novaesii; Scuticaria peruviana; Scuticaria salesiana; Scuticaria steelei; Scuticaria strictifolia

= Scuticaria (plant) =

Genus of orchids

Scuticaria is a genus of orchids comprising 9 species native to Belize, Brazil, Ecuador, French Guiana, Guyana, Peru, Suriname and Venezuela. Members of this genus have showy flowers and long cylindrical leaves. They are epiphytic, occasionally lithophytic or terrestrial, that grow pending and are cespitously, or reptant and ascending, which exist is three isolated areas of South America, in Ecuador, Amazon Forest and Serra do Mar and Serra da Mantiqueira mountains, in Brazil, both in shady and sunny places.

The genus Scuticaria has been traditionally placed close to Maxillaria but recent research shows they are more closely related to the genus Bifrenaria. Despite their interesting appearance, they are hardly seen in nature and, because their culture is complicated, they are not common in private collections and orchid shows either. No other use for these species is reported besides ornamentation. Because it is a well established genus, formed by a few species that are reasonably easy to separate, there were few publications about them during the last decades.

== Distribution and habit ==
Despite there are few species, Scuticaria inhabit varied climates, disperse in a very uneven way through all countries of South America northern to Bolivia, this excluded, and also in areas of Mata Atlântica in Brazilian Southeast. No species is common in nature, being just occasionally or even rarely found.

The species with wider range is Scuticaria steelei which inhabits open clearings at higher elevations of central Amazon, jungles known as matas de terra firme, up to eight hundred meters of altitude. Although this species occupies wide area, it is not found very often. Another species from Amazon, however, in a much more restricted area, just in Guyana, in places where the altitude is lower and the humidity is higher, is Scuticaria hadwenii var. dogsonii.

Endemic in another area of Amazon, separated but not that far from the habitat of Scuticaria steelei, on southeastern Ecuador, close to the place where the Andes starts, in humid and slightly colder forests, on the mountains up to 1,300 meters of altitude, it is found Scuticaria salesiana. Under the same conditions but in wider areas, that encompass the southeast of Ecuador and northeast of Peru, lives S. peruviana. All species from Amazon are always epiphytic.

The remaining species inhabit the area occupied by Brazilian Atlantic Forest. The only species that can be found widespread through several states is Scuticaria hadwenii, in the humid jungles of Serra do Mar from Santa Catarina to Bahia States, generally found living epiphytic at middle height over thick tree stems. Other species occasionally found, although often under living lithophytic over rocks and gatherings of fallen leaves in sunny areas of the mountains of São Paulo and Rio de Janeiro, is S. strictifolia.

Scuticaria irwiniana, second and last rupicolous species, exists only on the mountains of Minas Gerais State, found in sunny or shadier places up to two thousand meters of altitude. Two are the species from Espírito Santo State, S. novaesii and S. kautskyi, both endemic of restricted areas in the dry jungles of the countryside. The last Scuticaria species is S. itirapinensis, which has been found only a couple of times in the west-central dry woods of São Paulo State, in an area which has been highly deforested, close to Itirapina. There are no records or reports on this species, both in nature and under culture, during the last twenty-five years. It is speculated about the possibility of its extinction.

== Description ==
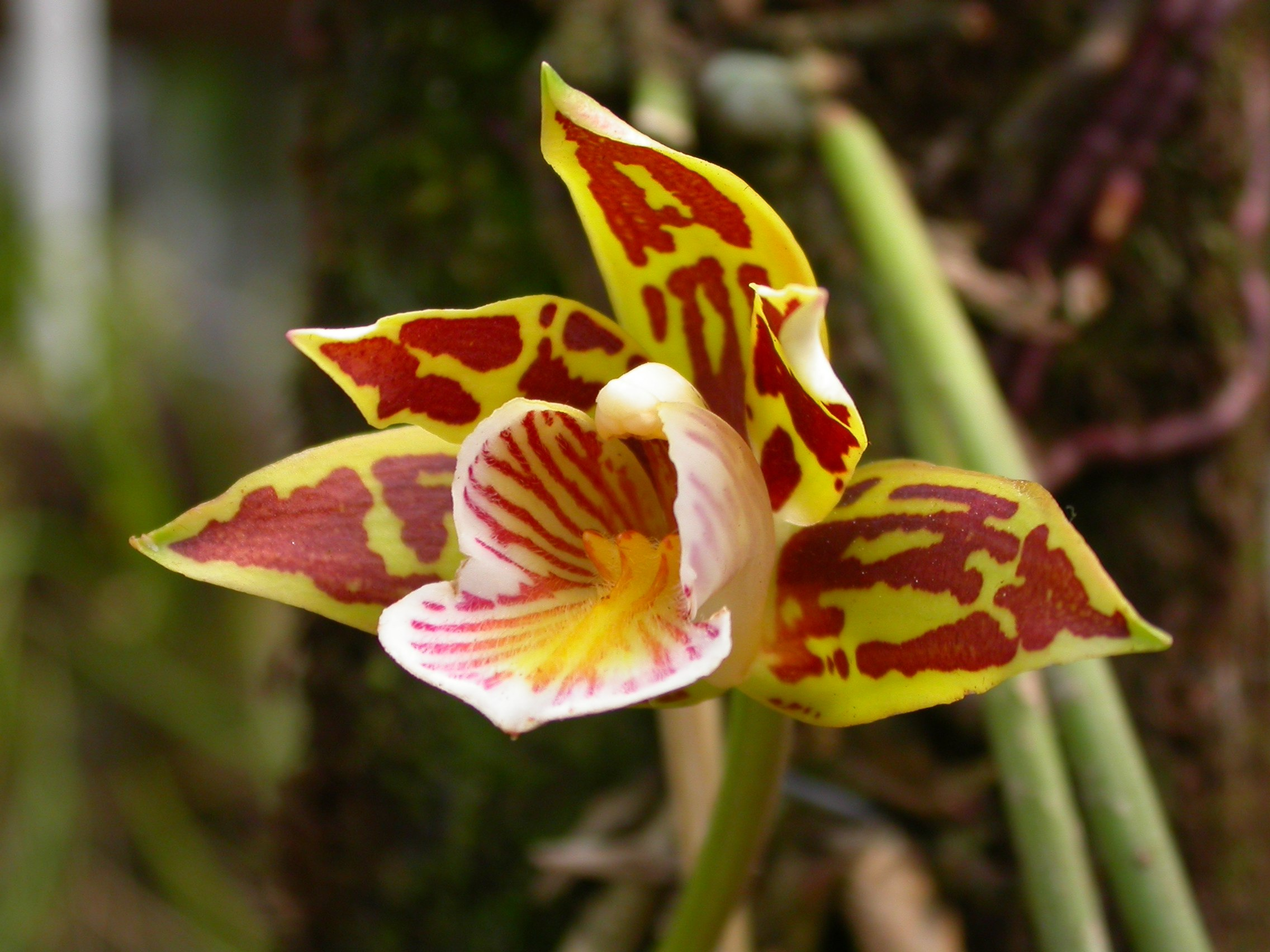
Scuticaria novaesii, an endemic species from Espírito Santo State in Brazil discovered in 1981.

The species subordinated to genus Scuticaria are characterized by being plants of thick cylindrical roots covered by thick vellamen. Their stem is formed by an ordinarily short rhizome, slightly elongated in some species; and by cylindrical almost inconspicuous pseudobulbs of the same diameter or slightly thicker than the unique leaf born on their apexes, because they generally are covered by small dried scaling steaths. The leaves may be erect or pending up to one meter long. The inflorescences grow from the said steaths and almost always bear just one flower, exceptionally two in one species, and always is much longer than the pseudobulbs, bearing showy yellow, orange, purple or greenish flowers, with petals and sepals plain, stained or striped, usually by light brown but also by diverse combinations and shades of the other mentioned colors. Ordinarily the labellum presents contrasting colors, frequently with white areas.

The flowers are large, wide open, and last during about two weeks. They have sepals of similar sizes and form an almost invisible chin with the column foot. The petals may be similar to the sepals but smaller, or much smaller and with a much narrower base, occasionally showing different patterns or colors. The labellum articulates with the column, is trilobed, with comparatively small lateral lobes and larger terminal, which has variable shapes with diverse patterns and a callus under to column. The later is é semi-cylindrical, slightly arching, erect and thick, without any kind of appendix, ending in an apical anther and elongated in a small foot at the base. The flowers bear to pairs of pollinia of different sizes. The caudicle is narrow and the retinacle is small. The fruits resemble the ones of Maxillaria. There are no observation records of pollinators activities but Scuticaria are supposedly pollinated by Euglossini bees.

== Taxonomic notes ==
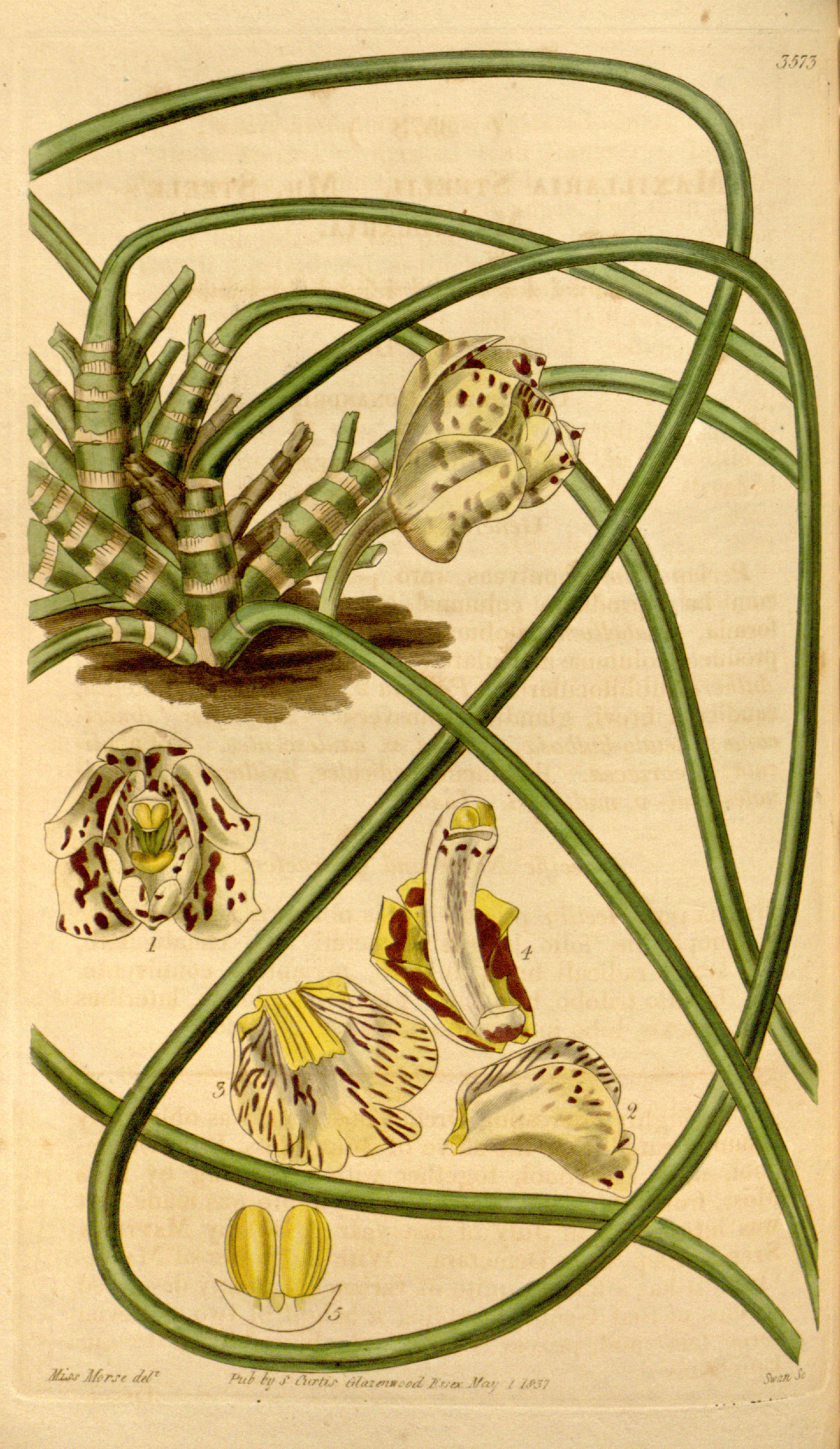
Scuticaria steelei. Illustration of original description published by William Jackson Hooker in 1837.

In May 1837, the English Botanist William Jackson Hooker received a drawing and a dried sample of a plant, sent by an orchid grower from Liverpool, together with a note explaining that the plant arrived from Demerara, in Guyana, in July of the preceding year. Hooker described this species, classifying it under the genus Maxillaria, calling it M. steelei, in homage to its discoverer. In his description, Hooker affirms that the plant is highly interesting and an excellent addition to the known epiphytic species because it shows cylindrical leaves almost one meter long, different from anything ever found. A few months later, John Lindley published again the species Hooker described, however, adding more information. Two years earlier, several plants had been sent from Demerara and Lindey reports that he had previously informally classified this species as Maxillaria flabellifera which, under this name, could be found in several orchid collection in England. Because he had not yet described this species, he accepts the priority of the name chosen by Hooker. Lindley adds, however, that he had some doubts about the classification, of a species so different from any other known so far, under the genus Maxillaria.

In 1843, Lindley published a revision of a group of orchids classified as tribus Maxillaridae, then subordinated to Vandeae, a subfamily of Orchidaceae at the time. In this revision, he indicates that much work is needed till the limits between each genus within this tribus can be established and states his doubts regarding some of the new genera he was proposing, despite being very sure of other ones. Lindley suggested the division of Maxillaridae in twenty-five genera, being Scuticaria one of the genera he considered well established. When describing this new genus, Lindley based on morphologic characteristics of Maxillaria steelei Hook., selected as the Type species of Scuticaria with the name Scuticaria steelei. This name comes from Latin scutica, flagellum, in reference to the long cylindrical leaves that the species of this genus show, similar to the leather whips used to punish.

Strangely, because he published the genus Scuticaria many years earlier, in 1851, Lindley described another species now considered part of this genus, classifying it under Bifrenaria. It is speculated that possibly because it was found in Brazil on the same area in the southeast where most of Bifrenaria were common, or because he believed that two species separated by so long distance belonged to the same genus. It was Scuticaria hadwenii. Few months later, Jules Émile Planchon corrected Lindley moving it to the genus where it is subordinated today. In 1851, the only two common Scuticaria species were described and the genus well established, therefore no later confusion about the classification of any species subordinated to this genus ever happened.

Almost one century passed before any important new information were published. In 1881 Heinrich Gustav Reichenbach described Scuticaria dogsonii, originated from Guyana, but in 1892, Berthold Stein, considering that the only difference it shows from Scuticaria hadwenii is the fact it bears two flowers each inflorescence, reduced it to a variety of the later. In 1903, Célestin Alfred Cogniaux, when revising all orchids species from Brazil, cites two other varieties of Scuticaria hadwenii which, because just show color differences, can not be accepted as such today. Finally, in 1947, Frederico Carlos Hoehne described a new species, Scuticaria strictifolia, yet similar to Scuticaria hadwenii, although showing some slight differences on the labellum structure, besides their normally lithophytic habit and erect leaves.

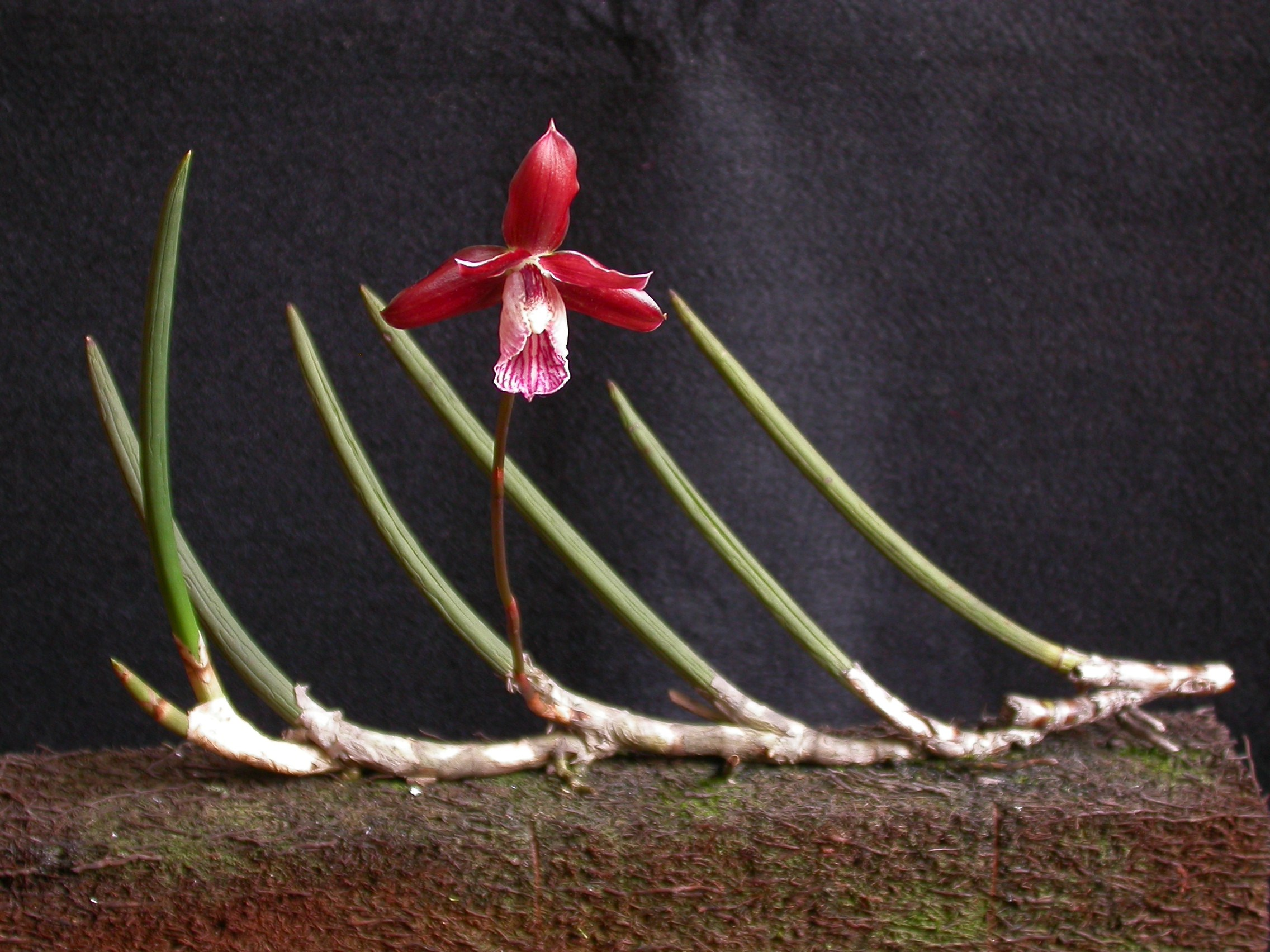
Scuticaria irwiniana, is one of the two Scuticaria species with erect leaves and the one with the shortest leaves among all species.

If few species were known so far, after 1968 the number of described species triplicated. All species described during the later years are uncommon and inhabit restricted areas, some are very rare or even supposedly extinct. In 1968 Robert Louis Dressler described Scuticaria salesiana, discovered in Ecuador in an area far apart from the other Scuticaria range. In 1972, Guido Pabst described Scuticaria kautskyi, found in Espírito Santo State, in southeast Brazil and, during the following year, published two species at once, S. itirapinensis and S. irwiniana. In 1982, other species was discovered in Espírito Santo, Scuticaria novaesii. The last described species was S. peruviana, found in Peru in 2002, in the same region of S. salesiana, to which it is related.

Despite Lindley indicated the possibility of Scuticaria being closely related to Bifrenaria when he initially described S. hadwenii under this genus, all later taxonomists always included Scuticaria on the same group Maxillaria were. It was just in 2000 that the first proofs of Scuticaria closer proximity to Bifrenaria started being published. In 2002, a detailed research about the phylogeny of Bifrenaria performed molecular analyses on two Scuticaria species while choosing them as out groups. This study claims that the phylogenethic internal relationships among Scuticaria species so far remain unknown.

It is known that other orchid genera bearing cylindrical leaves devolved this sort of leaves as a defense to climate changes their habitats were going through along the eras. Terete leaves are capable of much more water and nutrients and to face longer drought periods than species bearing thin leaves, on the other hand, almost all epiphytic species presenting the former type of leaves show more or less atrophied pseudobulbs since the leaves carry on its accumulating role. It is a supposition that Scuticaria species should have once inhabited much drier through their evolution. Because most of the species are found in shadier and more humid species now, this may one of the reasons why their culture uses to be complicated, possibly because the delicate balance they reached in nature is broken. For the same reason, it is supposed their frequency in nature is only occasional or rare.

== Species ==
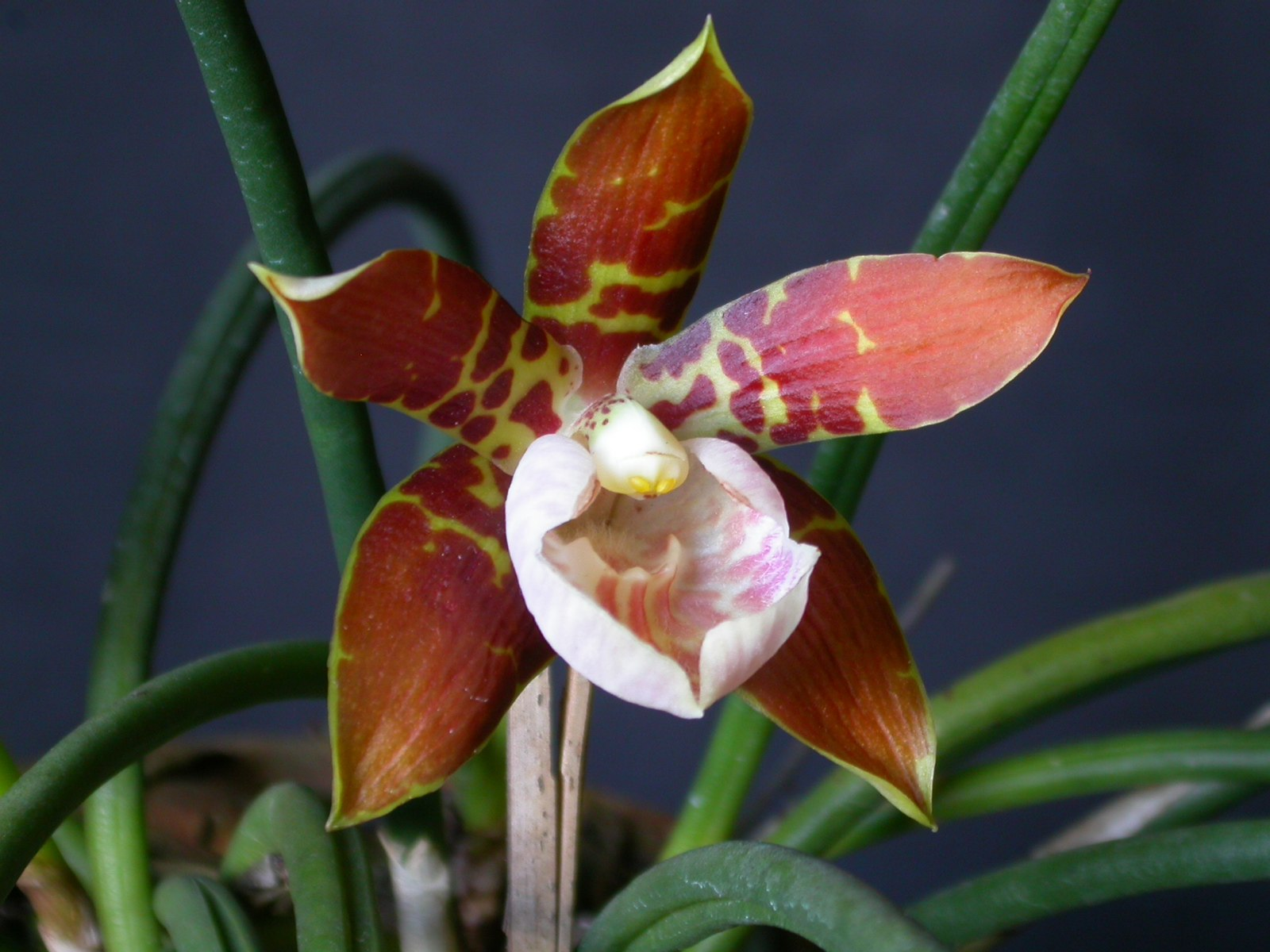
Scuticaria hadwenii is the most variable among Scuticaria species and widespread through a large area in Southeast of Brazil.

Because of its highly particular morphologic characteristics which allow immediate identification, its restricted species distribution, and its comparatively low variability, since the genus Scuticaria was established by Lindley, only ten species were formally described and there has never been much confusion concerning the distinguishing of any of the species. Out of these ten, nine are generally accepted, the tenth being normally accepted not as a species but as a variety. For identification purposes, the species can be split as follows:

Only two species present erect leaves and are the only ones frequently found as lithophytes, Scuticaria irwiniana, easily known recognized because of its flowers without any stains on the internally entirely purple and externally whitish sepals and petals, with white labellum, striped of purple. This species generally can be identified even without flowers because of its reptant, slightly ascendant growth, and longer rhizome than any other species. Scuticaria strictifolia also has erect leaves but occasionally, when cultivated under insufficient light, their leaves can be narrower and slightly bent making the distracted observer find hard to differentiate it from S. hadwenii. The Brazilian taxonomist Guido Pabst considered this species a variety of the later.

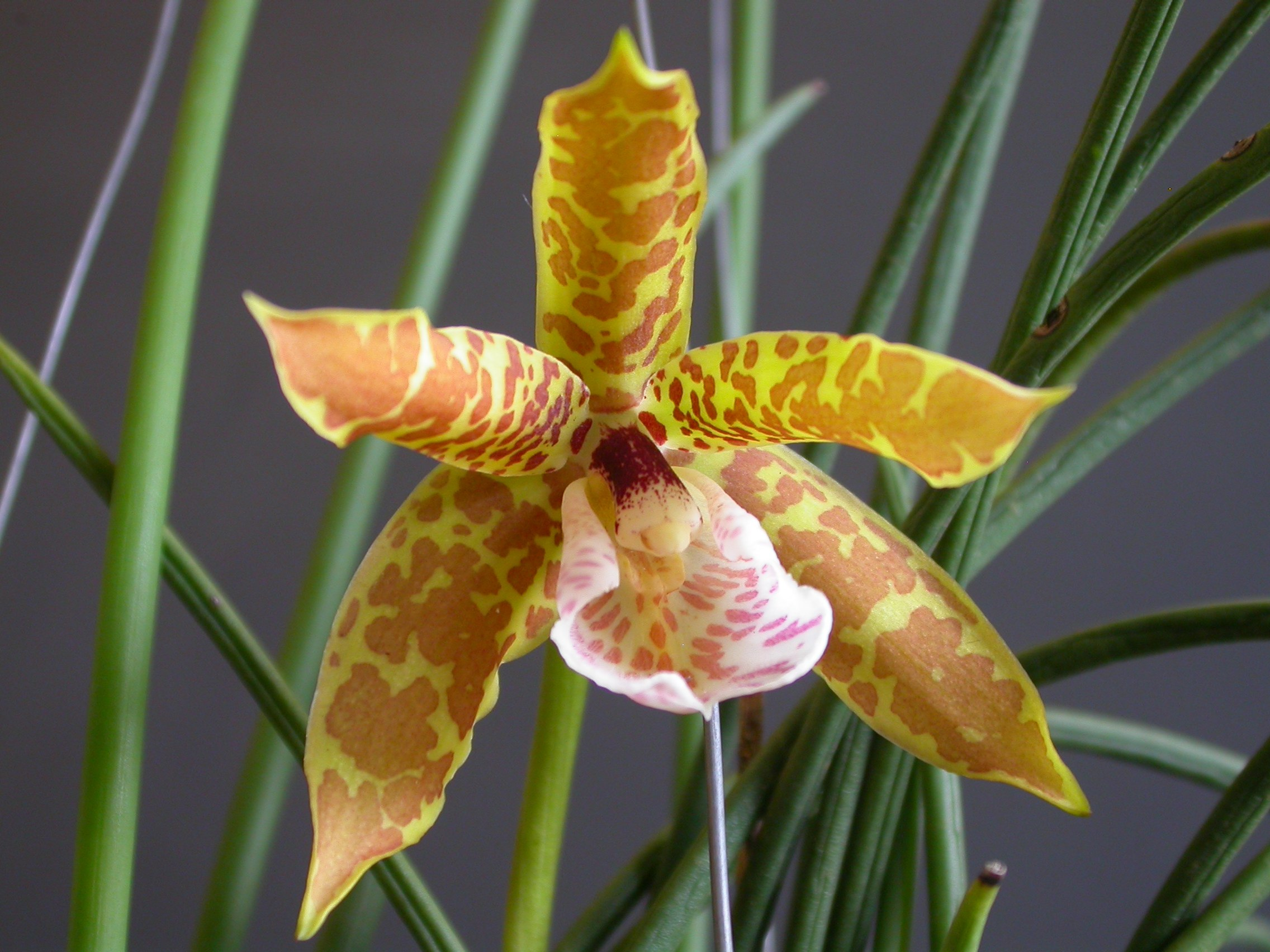
Scuticaria strictifolia, which is very close to Scuticaria hadwenii but has erect leaves; different colors and diverse callus structure on the labellum.

All species remaining are epiphytic with pendant habit. Scuticaria hadwenii, due to its several more or less isolated groups of populations along Serra do Mar, mostly on the west side of this chain of mountains, spreading throughout the interior highland in some states of Brazil, is the Scuticaria species that presents most variable colors. It can be separated from S. strictifolia because shows leaves always pending, flowers of more vivid colors and by the interior of the labellum, which ordinarily is more pubescent. There is a variety denominated dogsonii, native from Guyana, which is more floriferous.

The two other species from Espírito Santo State are highly different from each other. Scuticaria kautskyi usually has more or less uniform orange color on its sepals and petals, with their bases slightly lighter and dotted of greenish-yellow. Their labellum is white showing few colored drawings and narrow terminal lobe, slightly deflected. The other species from this state, Scuticaria novaesii presents flowers with green-yellow segments, intensely spotted with dark brown and wide and flat labellum terminal lobe, with clearly marked by radial multicolored lines.

Scuticaria itirapinensis, the last species of Brazilian southeast, is the one that closely resembles Amazonian Scuticaria steelei, although it can be easily separated because of its strong yellow flowers and much shorter leaves, besides slight differences on the proportions of floral structures. A Scuticaria steelei presents entirely pale yellow flowers, completely covered by spaced small darker stains, However it is not even necessary to observe the flowers to identify it as their leaves are about one meter long, and there are references of plants measuring almost one and a half meter.

The last two Scuticariaare isolated in forests of Peru and Ecuador and are similar to each other. They are different from all other because of the proportions of floral segments. The labellum is much larger when compared to their sepals and petals than it is on other species. Moreover, their petals are striped of brown and much smaller than the sepals, showing a greater difference than it is found on the other species. From each other, they can be separated mostly by the shape of the labellum. Scuticaria salesiana presents more rounded intermediate lobe, and Scuticaria peruviana has it more rectangular, with the apex truncated, almost in a straight line.

In 2008, a new species of Scuticaria, S. bahiensis has been described from Bahia state in Brazil but so far it remains mostly unknown.

== Culture ==
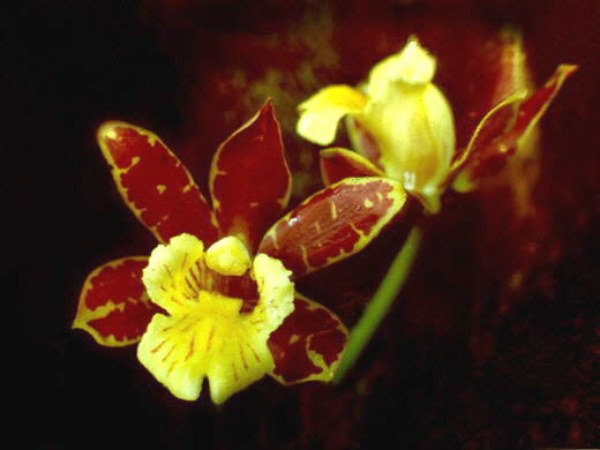
Scuticaria itirapinensis This showy species has been found just a couple of times in nature and has not been found or seen anywhere during the last decades.

In his book Flora Brasilica, the Brazilian Botanist Frederico Hoehne strongly recommended the culture of Scuticaria species because of their beautiful flowers and interesting vegetation, however, soon later he admits that all species then cultivated by São Paulo Botanic Garden had died after two or three years. Indeed, he claims that to successfully grow them a special environment needs to be created. These plants are not easy to maintain under culture. Only recently, with the help of modern technology, timers and foggers that keep the humidity constant, the growers have been finally capable of keeping them out of their natural environment for several years.

There are four different sorts of culture according to the origin of each species. S. steelei and S. hadwenii var. dogsonii are the species that need higher temperature and humidity. The two rupicolous species, S. irwiniana and S. strictifolia are the ones which need more light and constant ventilation besides drier culture conditions. S. peruviana and S. salesiana take slightly cooler temperatures than the other species although still need humidity mostly during the early morning hours. The other species need less light than the mentioned ones. All species should be preferably mounted on plaques of vegetable fibers because of their pending habit, the rupicolous species may alternatively potted in well-drained pots. Scuticaria are delicate plants that like to remain untouched during several years because their roots easily resent on replants.
