= San Roque de Cumbaza District =

Coordinates: 6.3853°S 76.4375°W

San Roque de Cumbaza
- District
- Interactive map of San Roque de Cumbaza
- Country: Peru
- Region: San Martín
- Province: Lamas
- Founded: December 29, 1964
- Capital: San Roque de Cumbaza

Government
  - Mayor: Angel Aguilar Castillo

Area
  - Total: 525.15 km^{2} (202.76 sq mi)
- Elevation: 600 m (2,000 ft)

Population (2017)
  - Total: 1,635
  - Density: 3.113/km^{2} (8.064/sq mi)
- Time zone: UTC-5 (PET)
- UBIGEO: 220508

San Roque de Cumbaza District is one of eleven districts of the province Lamas in Peru.
