= Cuñumbuqui District =

Coordinates: 6.3127°S 76.6715°W

Cuñumbuqui
- District
- Interactive map of Cuñumbuqui
- Country: Peru
- Region: San Martín
- Province: Lamas
- Founded: October 16, 1933
- Capital: Cuñumbuqui

Government
  - Mayor: Nicolas Davila Rios

Area
  - Total: 191.46 km^{2} (73.92 sq mi)
- Elevation: 240 m (790 ft)

Population (2005 census)
  - Total: 3,828
  - Density: 19.99/km^{2} (51.78/sq mi)
- Time zone: UTC-5 (PET)
- UBIGEO: 220505

Cuñumbuqui District is one of eleven districts of the province Lamas in Peru.
