= Pinto Recodo District =

Coordinates: 6.3781°S 76.6070°W

Pinto Recodo
- District
- Interactive map of Pinto Recodo
- Country: Peru
- Region: San Martín
- Province: Lamas
- Founded: February 2, 1962
- Capital: Pinto Recodo

Government
  - Mayor: Goethe Angulo Gonzalez

Area
  - Total: 524.07 km^{2} (202.34 sq mi)
- Elevation: 300 m (980 ft)

Population (2005 census)
  - Total: 8,704
  - Density: 16.61/km^{2} (43.02/sq mi)
- Time zone: UTC-5 (PET)
- UBIGEO: 220506

Pinto Recodo District is one of eleven districts of the province Lamas in Peru.
