= Alonso de Alvarado District =

Coordinates: 6.3550°S 76.7751°W

Alonso de Alvarado
- District
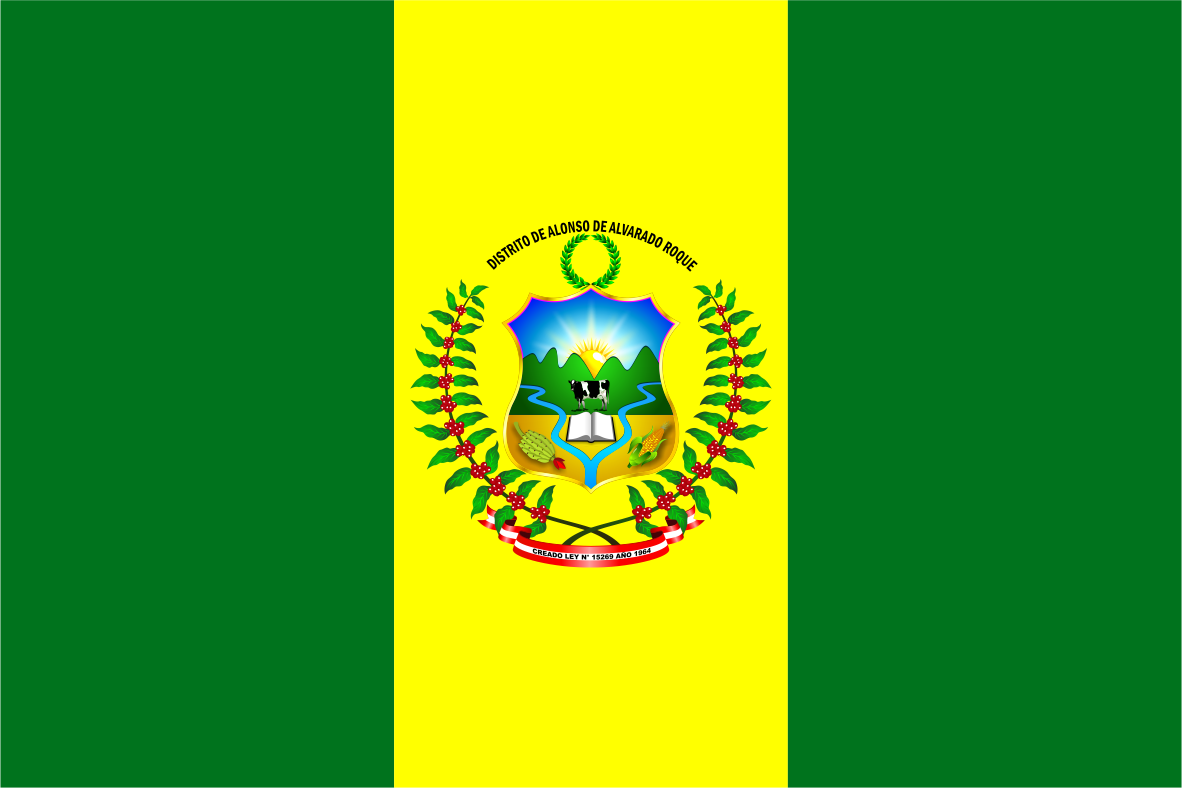
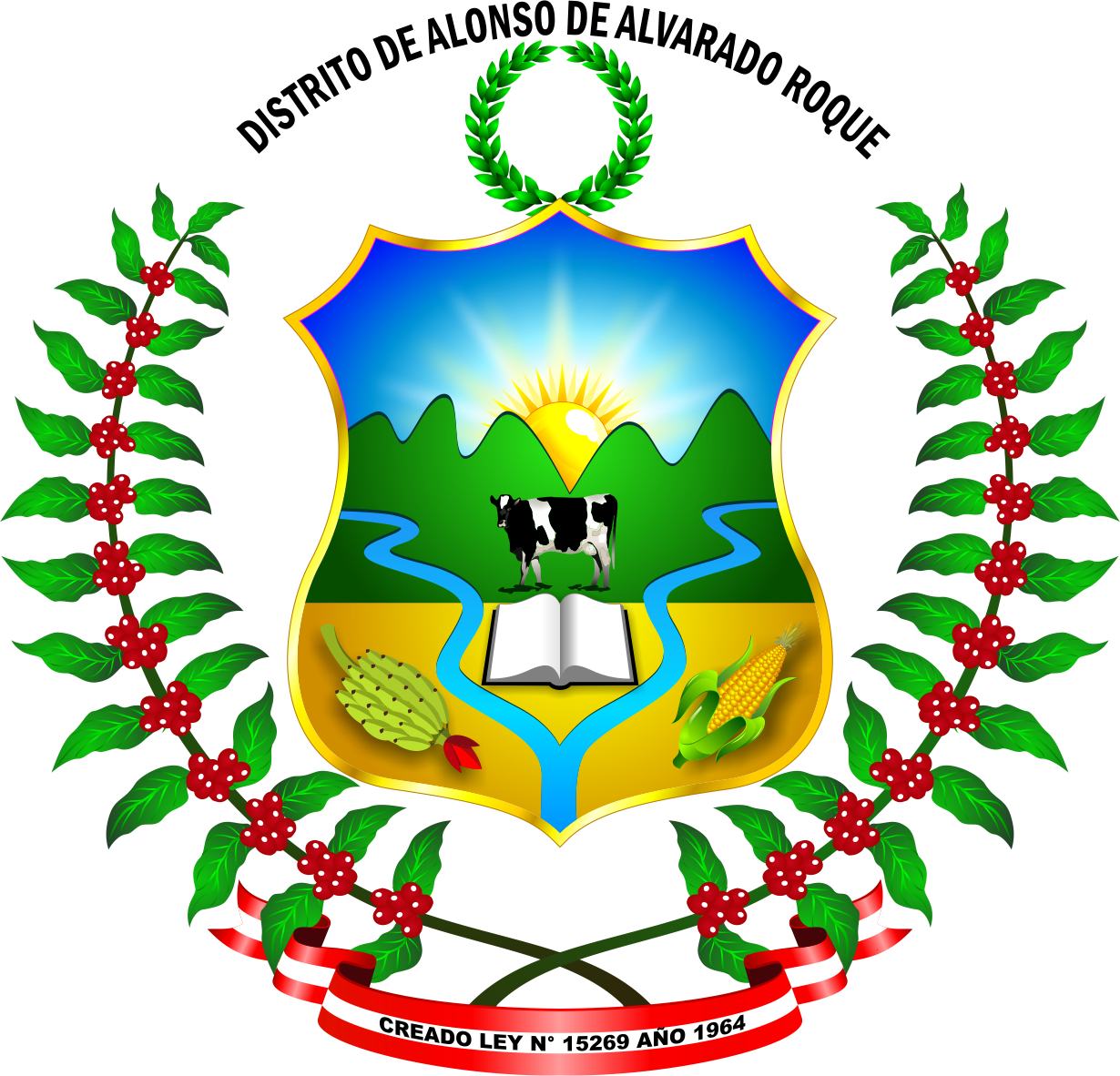
- Flag Coat of arms
- Interactive map of Alonso de Alvarado
- Country: Peru
- Region: San Martín
- Province: Lamas
- Founded: December 29, 1964
- Capital: Roque

Government
  - Mayor: Antolin Guerrero Cordova

Area
  - Total: 294.2 km^{2} (113.6 sq mi)
- Elevation: 1,100 m (3,600 ft)

Population (2017)
  - Total: 13,462
  - Density: 45.76/km^{2} (118.5/sq mi)
- Time zone: UTC-5 (PET)
- UBIGEO: 220502

Alonso de Alvarado District is one of eleven districts of the province Lamas in Peru.
