= Lamas District =

Coordinates: 6.4232°S 76.5081°W

- District
- Interactive map of Lamas District
- Country: Peru
- Region: San Martín
- Province: Lamas
- Capital: Lamas

Government
  - Mayor: Onésimo Huamán

Area
  - Total: 79.82 km^{2} (30.82 sq mi)
- Elevation: 809 m (2,654 ft)

Population (2017)
  - Total: 14,497
  - Density: 181.6/km^{2} (470.4/sq mi)
- Time zone: UTC-5 (PET)
- UBIGEO: 220501

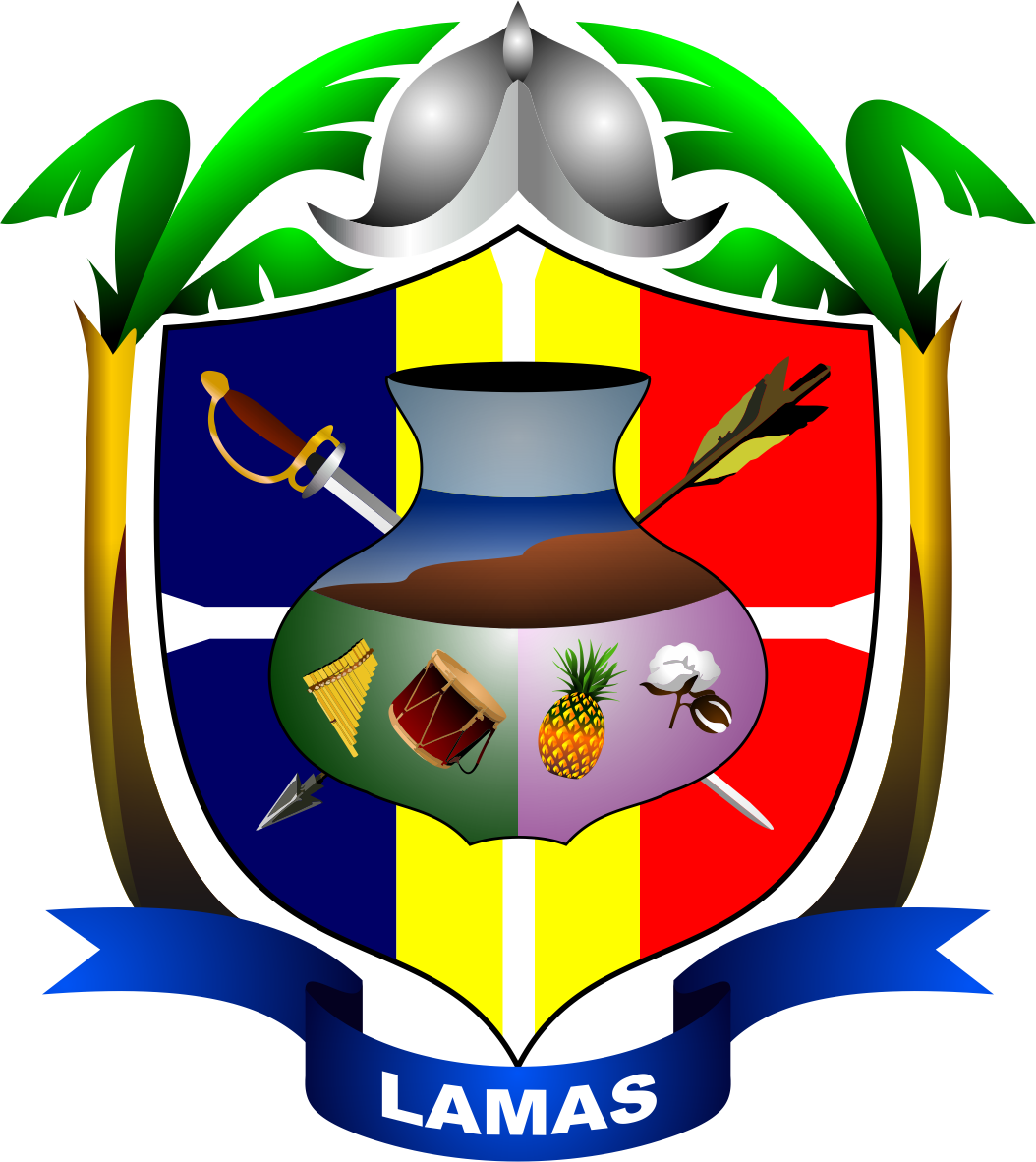
Lamas district, Lamas Province, San Martin, Peru

Lamas District is one of eleven districts of the province Lamas in Peru.

== Climate ==
Climate data for Lamas, elevation 840 m (2,760 ft), (1991–2020)
| Month | Jan | Feb | Mar | Apr | May | Jun | Jul | Aug | Sep | Oct | Nov | Dec | Year |
|---|---|---|---|---|---|---|---|---|---|---|---|---|---|
| Mean daily maximum °C (°F) | 28.8 (83.8) | 28.4 (83.1) | 28.2 (82.8) | 28.0 (82.4) | 27.8 (82.0) | 27.5 (81.5) | 27.7 (81.9) | 28.9 (84.0) | 29.3 (84.7) | 29.2 (84.6) | 29.2 (84.6) | 28.8 (83.8) | 28.5 (83.3) |
| Mean daily minimum °C (°F) | 20.8 (69.4) | 20.6 (69.1) | 20.5 (68.9) | 20.4 (68.7) | 20.2 (68.4) | 19.7 (67.5) | 19.3 (66.7) | 19.7 (67.5) | 20.0 (68.0) | 20.4 (68.7) | 20.8 (69.4) | 20.8 (69.4) | 20.3 (68.5) |
| Average precipitation mm (inches) | 109.4 (4.31) | 132.9 (5.23) | 152.6 (6.01) | 142.6 (5.61) | 119.6 (4.71) | 78.5 (3.09) | 81.3 (3.20) | 56.6 (2.23) | 100.5 (3.96) | 126.2 (4.97) | 118.7 (4.67) | 107.6 (4.24) | 1,326.5 (52.23) |
Source: National Meteorology and Hydrology Service of Peru
