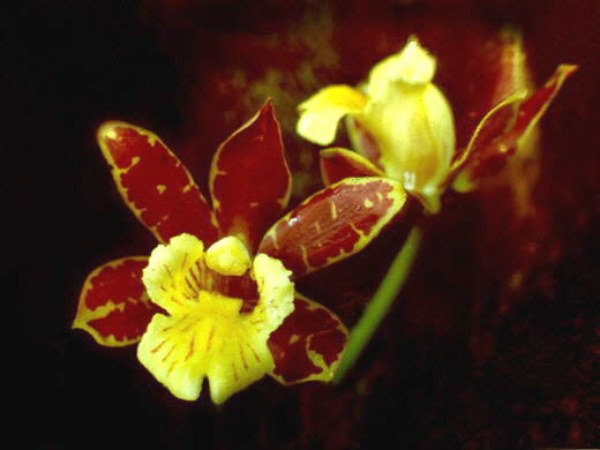
- Flower of Scuticaria itirapinensis

Scientific classification
- Kingdom: Plantae
- Clade: Tracheophytes
- Clade: Angiosperms
- Clade: Monocots
- Order: Asparagales
- Family: Orchidaceae
- Subfamily: Epidendroideae
- Genus: Scuticaria
- Species: S. itirapinensis

Binomial name
- Scuticaria itirapinensis Pabst

Synonyms
- Bifrenaria itirapinensis (Pabst) Meneguzzo & M.W.Chase

= Scuticaria itirapinensis =

Species of orchid

Scuticaria itirapinensis is a species of orchid endemic to Brazil (São Paulo). In 2024, Meneguzzo and M.W.Chase transferred the species to the genus Bifrenaria.
