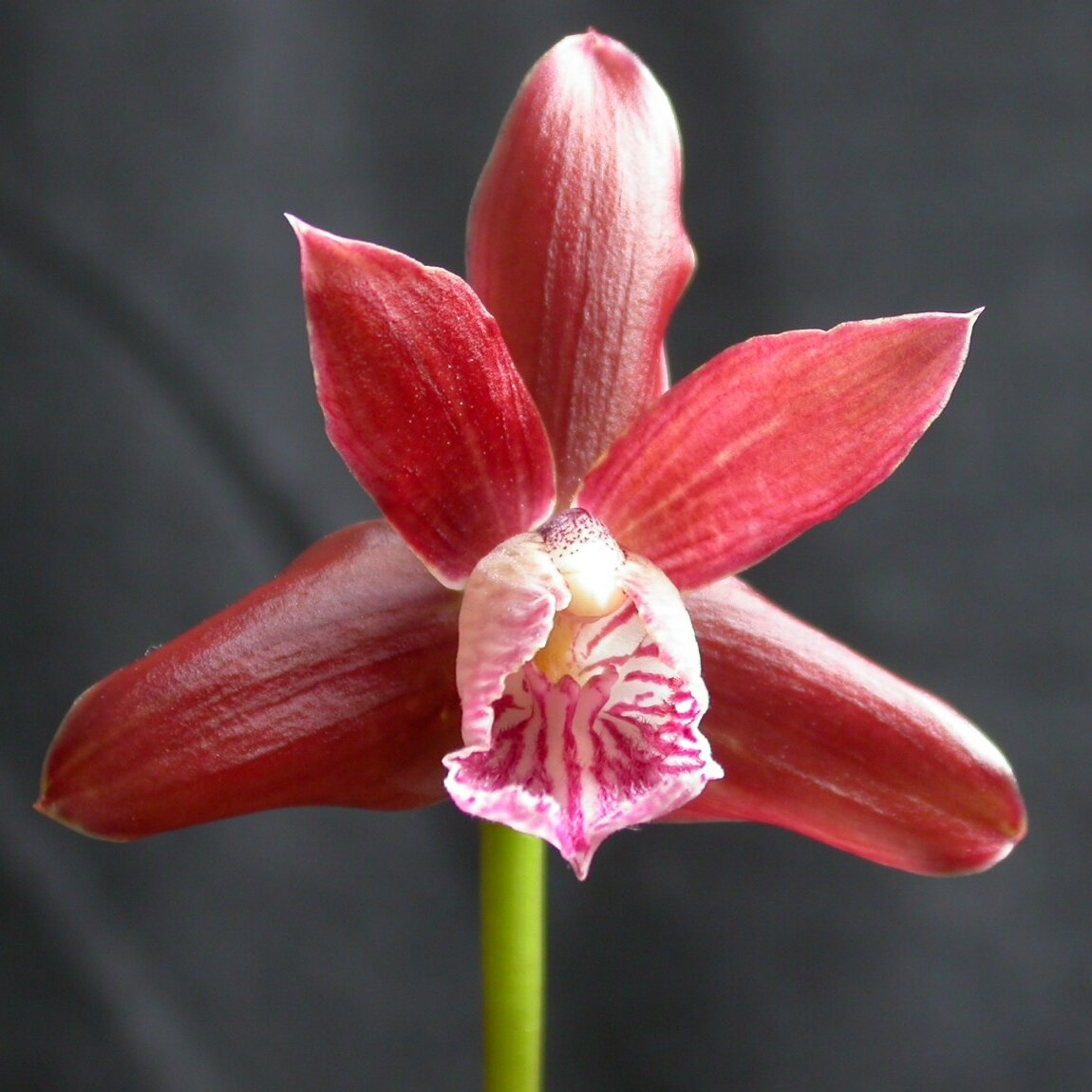
- Flower of Scuticaria irwiniana

Scientific classification
- Kingdom: Plantae
- Clade: Tracheophytes
- Clade: Angiosperms
- Clade: Monocots
- Order: Asparagales
- Family: Orchidaceae
- Subfamily: Epidendroideae
- Genus: Scuticaria
- Species: S. irwiniana

Binomial name
- Scuticaria irwiniana Pabst

= Scuticaria irwiniana =

Species of orchid

Scuticaria irwiniana is a species of orchid endemic to Brazil (Minas Gerais).
