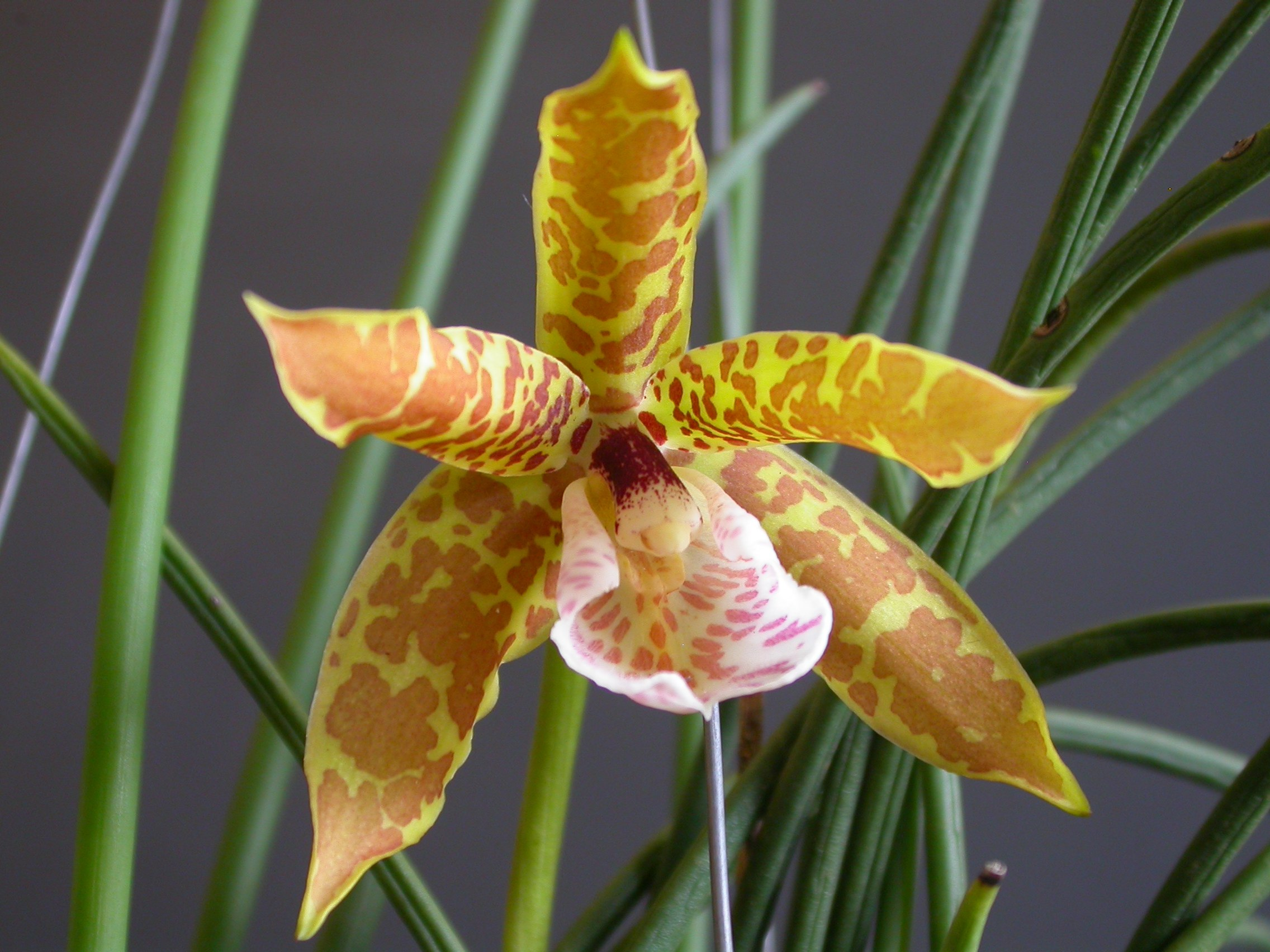
- Flower of Scuticaria strictifolia

Scientific classification
- Kingdom: Plantae
- Clade: Tracheophytes
- Clade: Angiosperms
- Clade: Monocots
- Order: Asparagales
- Family: Orchidaceae
- Subfamily: Epidendroideae
- Genus: Scuticaria
- Species: S. strictifolia

Binomial name
- Scuticaria strictifolia Hoehne

Synonyms
- Bifrenaria strictifolia (Hoehne) Meneguzzo & M.W.Chase

= Scuticaria strictifolia =

Species of orchid

Scuticaria strictifolia is a species of orchid endemic to Brazil (São Paulo). In 2024, Meneguzzo and M.W.Chase transferred the species to the genus Bifrenaria.
