= Lamas province =

Coordinates: 6.418230°S 76.520687°W

Lamas
- Province
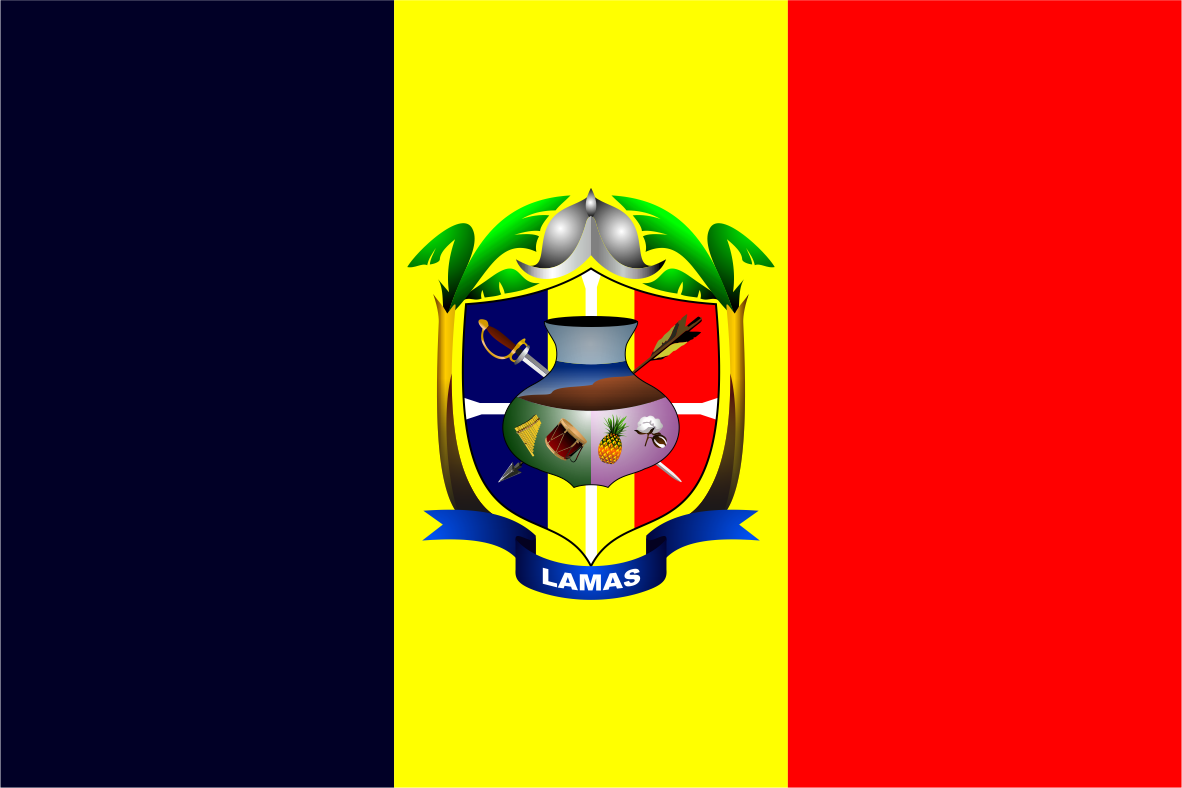
- Flag

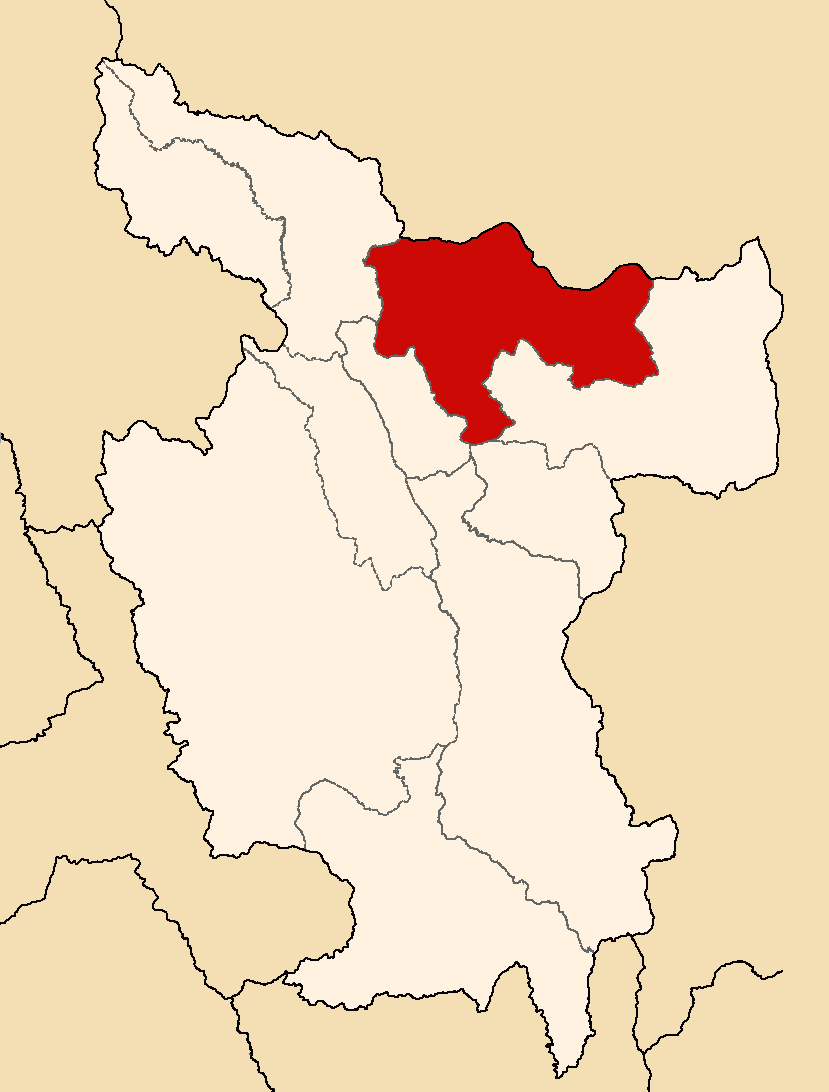
- Location of Lamas in the San Martín Region
- Country: Peru
- Region: San Martín
- Capital: Lamas

Government
  - Mayor: Onésimo Huamán

Area
  - Total: 5,040.67 km^{2} (1,946.21 sq mi)

Population
  - Total: 81,521
  - Density: 16.173/km^{2} (41.887/sq mi)
- UBIGEO: 2205

Lamas is one of ten provinces of the San Martín Region in northern Peru. The province is the home of the indigenous Kichwa-Lamista people.

== Political division ==
The province is divided into eleven districts, which are:

- Lamas
- Alonso de Alvarado
- Barranquita
- Caynarachi
- Cuñumbuqui
- Pinto Recodo
- Rumisapa
- San Roque de Cumbaza
- Shanao
- Tabalosos
- Zapatero
