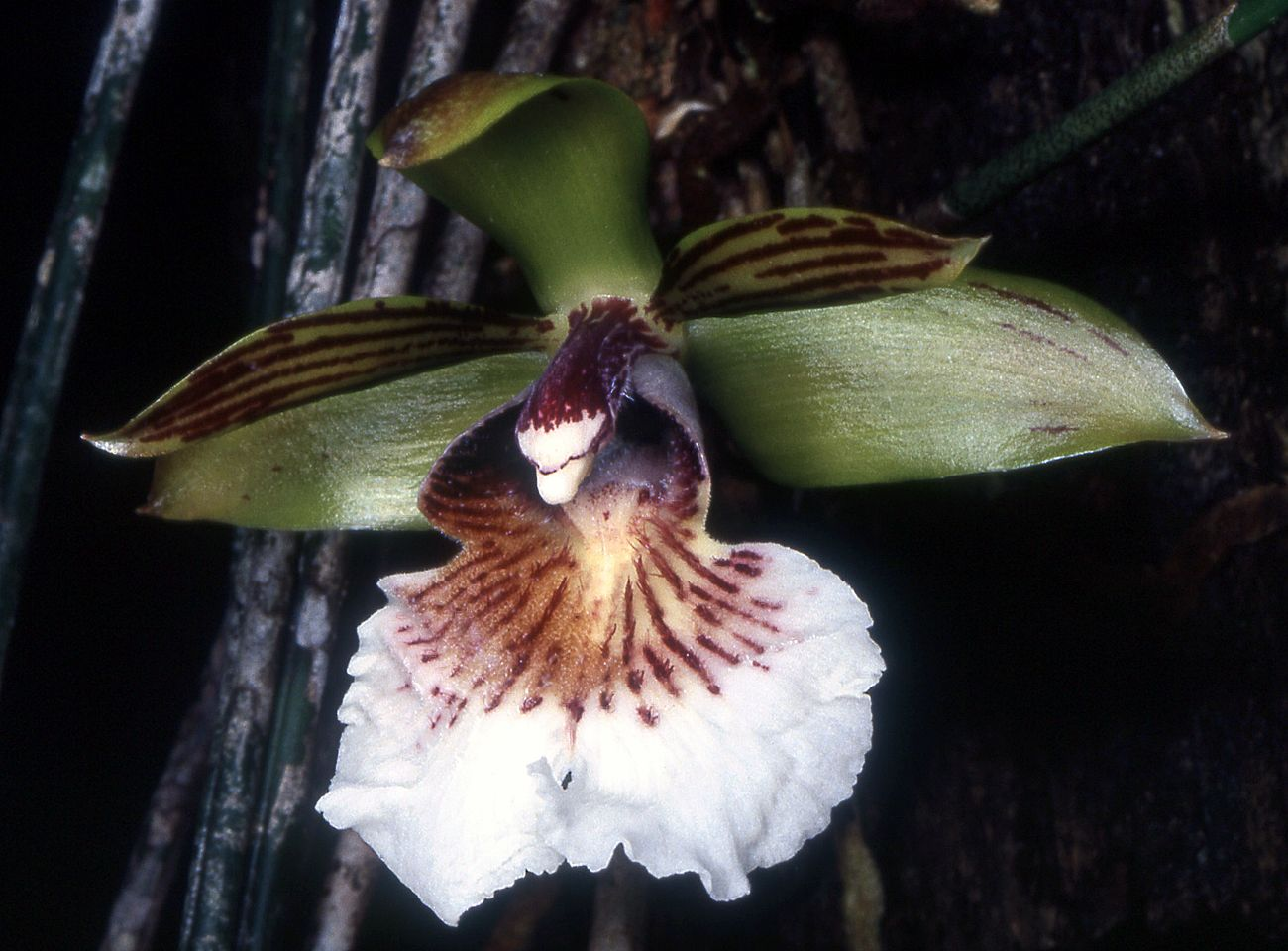
- Flower of Scuticaria salesiana

Scientific classification
- Kingdom: Plantae
- Clade: Tracheophytes
- Clade: Angiosperms
- Clade: Monocots
- Order: Asparagales
- Family: Orchidaceae
- Subfamily: Epidendroideae
- Genus: Scuticaria
- Species: S. salesiana

Binomial name
- Scuticaria salesiana Dressler

= Scuticaria salesiana =

Species of orchid

Scuticaria salesiana is a species of orchid ranging from southeastern Ecuador to Peru.
