= Shanao District =

Coordinates: 6.4093°S 76.5975°W

Shanao
- District
- Interactive map of Shanao
- Country: Peru
- Region: San Martín
- Province: Lamas
- Founded: February 12, 1952
- Capital: Shanao

Government
  - Mayor: Onesimo Huaman Daza

Area
  - Total: 24.59 km^{2} (9.49 sq mi)
- Elevation: 270 m (890 ft)

Population (2005 census)
  - Total: 2,088
  - Density: 84.91/km^{2} (219.9/sq mi)
- Time zone: UTC-5 (PET)
- UBIGEO: 220509

Shanao District is one of eleven districts of the province Lamas in Peru.
