= Zapatero District =

Coordinates: 6.5346°S 76.4997°W

- District
- Interactive map of Zapatero District
- Country: Peru
- Region: San Martín
- Province: Lamas
- Founded: October 15, 1954
- Capital: Zapatero

Government
  - Mayor: Wilder Del Aguila Del Castillo

Area
  - Total: 175 km^{2} (68 sq mi)
- Elevation: 290 m (950 ft)

Population (2005 census)
  - Total: 5,008
  - Density: 28.6/km^{2} (74.1/sq mi)
- Time zone: UTC-5 (PET)
- UBIGEO: 220511

Zapatero District is one of eleven districts of the province Lamas in Peru.

From the standpoint of the Catholic Church hierarchy, it is part of the Prelature Moyobamba, a suffragan of the Metropolitan Trujillo and assigned by Holy See to Archdiocese of Toledo in Spain.
