= Barranquita District =

Coordinates: 6.2430°S 76.0357°W

Barranquita
- District
- Interactive map of Barranquita
- Country: Peru
- Region: San Martín
- Province: Lamas
- Founded: February 9, 1962
- Capital: Barranquita

Government
  - Mayor: Elton John Villanueva Castillo

Area
  - Total: 1,022.86 km^{2} (394.93 sq mi)
- Elevation: 200 m (660 ft)

Population (2017)
  - Total: 6,429
  - Density: 6.285/km^{2} (16.28/sq mi)
- Time zone: UTC-5 (PET)
- UBIGEO: 220503

Barranquita District is one of eleven districts in the province of Lamas in Peru. Barranquita is located in the San Martin Region of Peru at 5°10'0" south of the equator and 76°57'0" west of the Prime Meridian. Segundo Roger Reátegui Chumbe, a member of the Fuerza Communal political party, is the district mayor.
