= Lamas, Peru =

Lamas
- Town
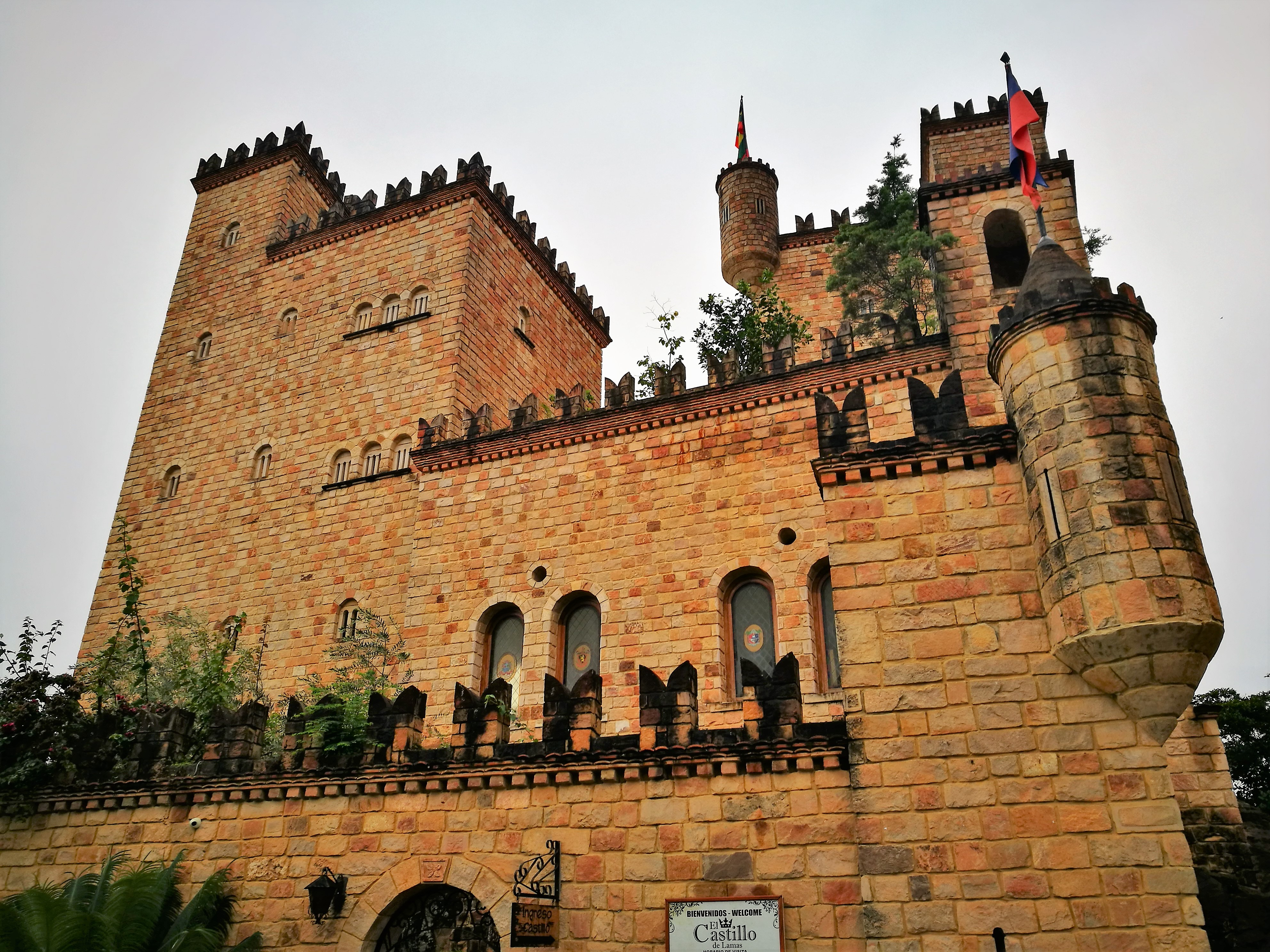
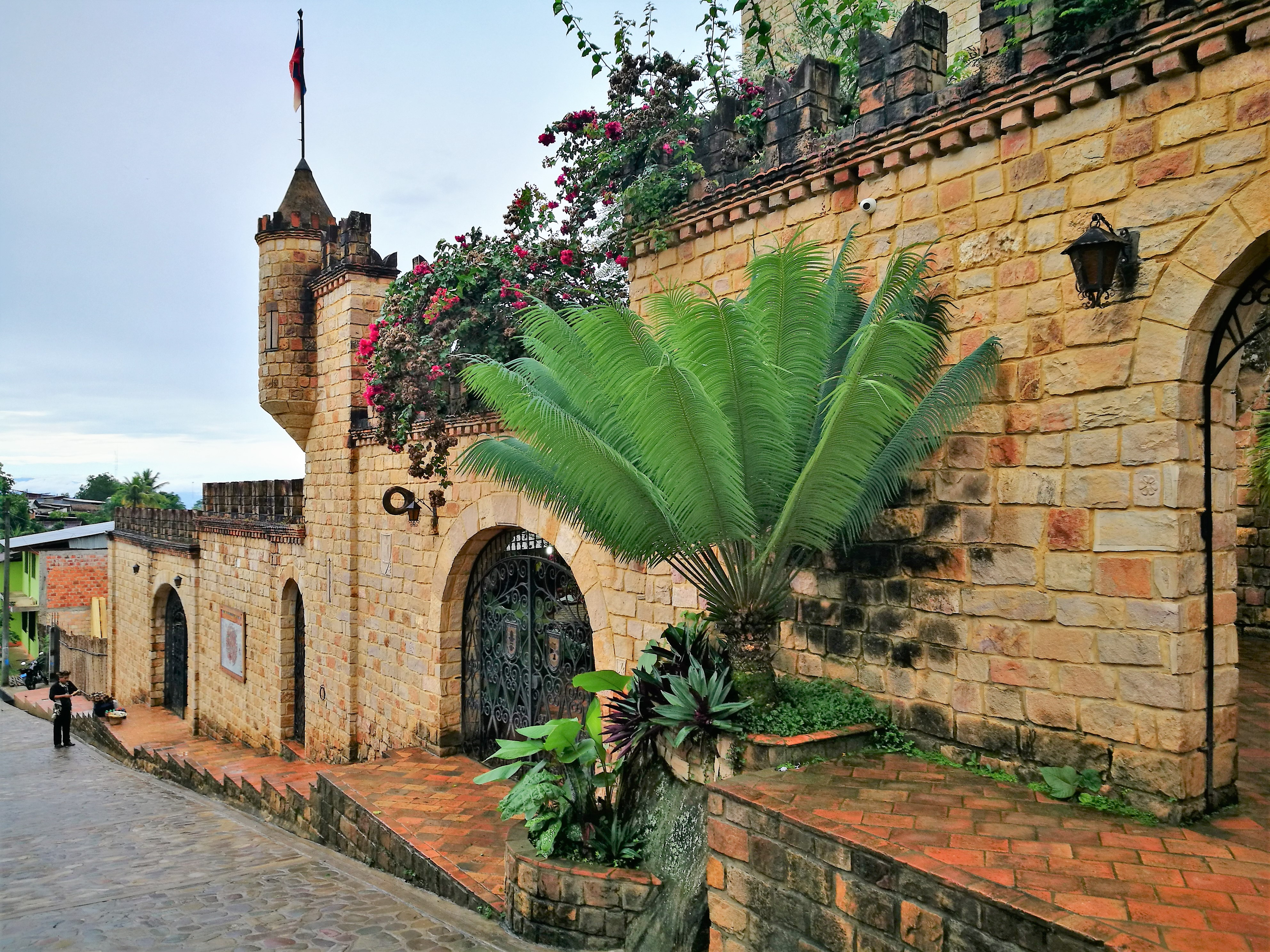
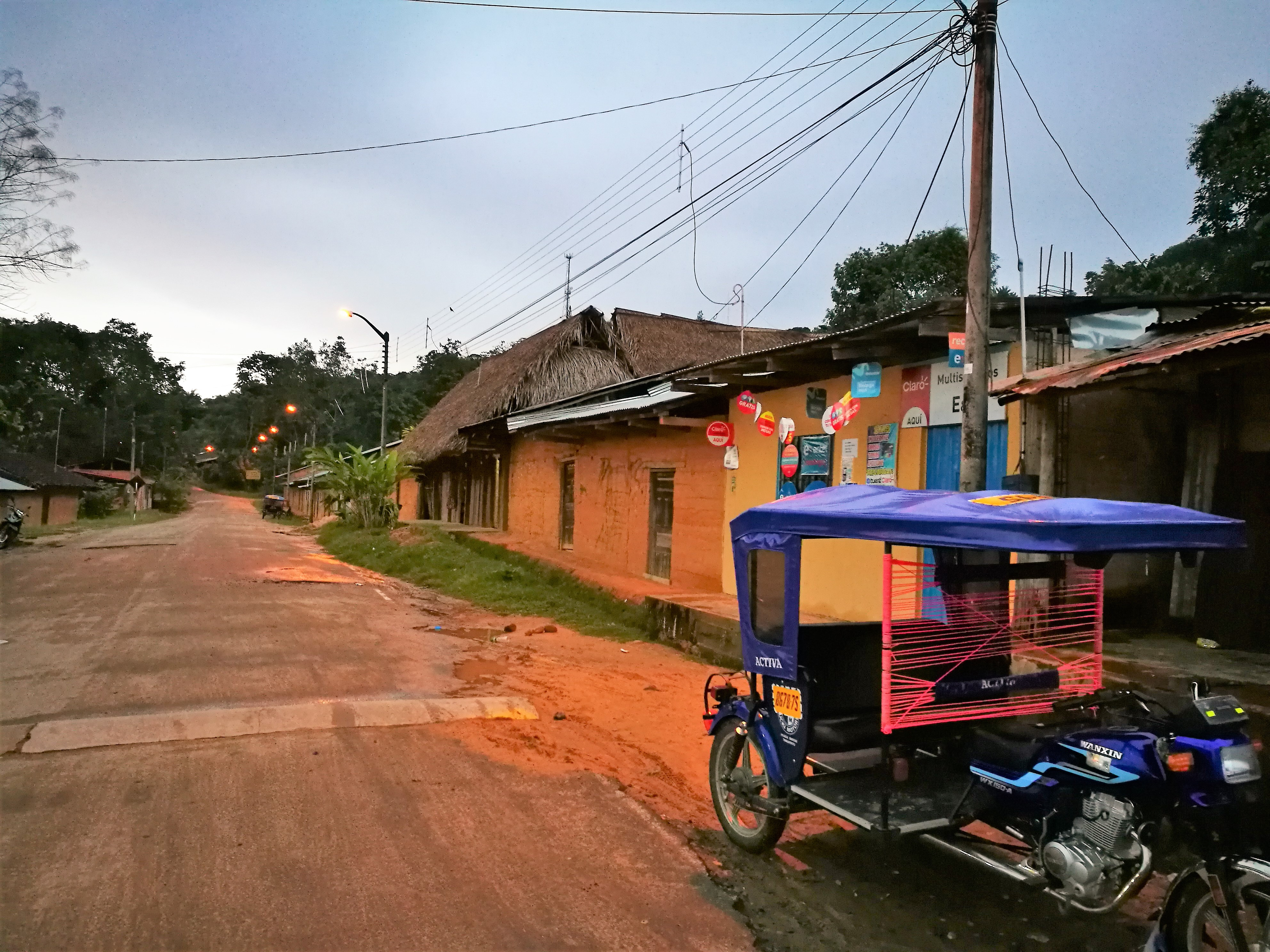
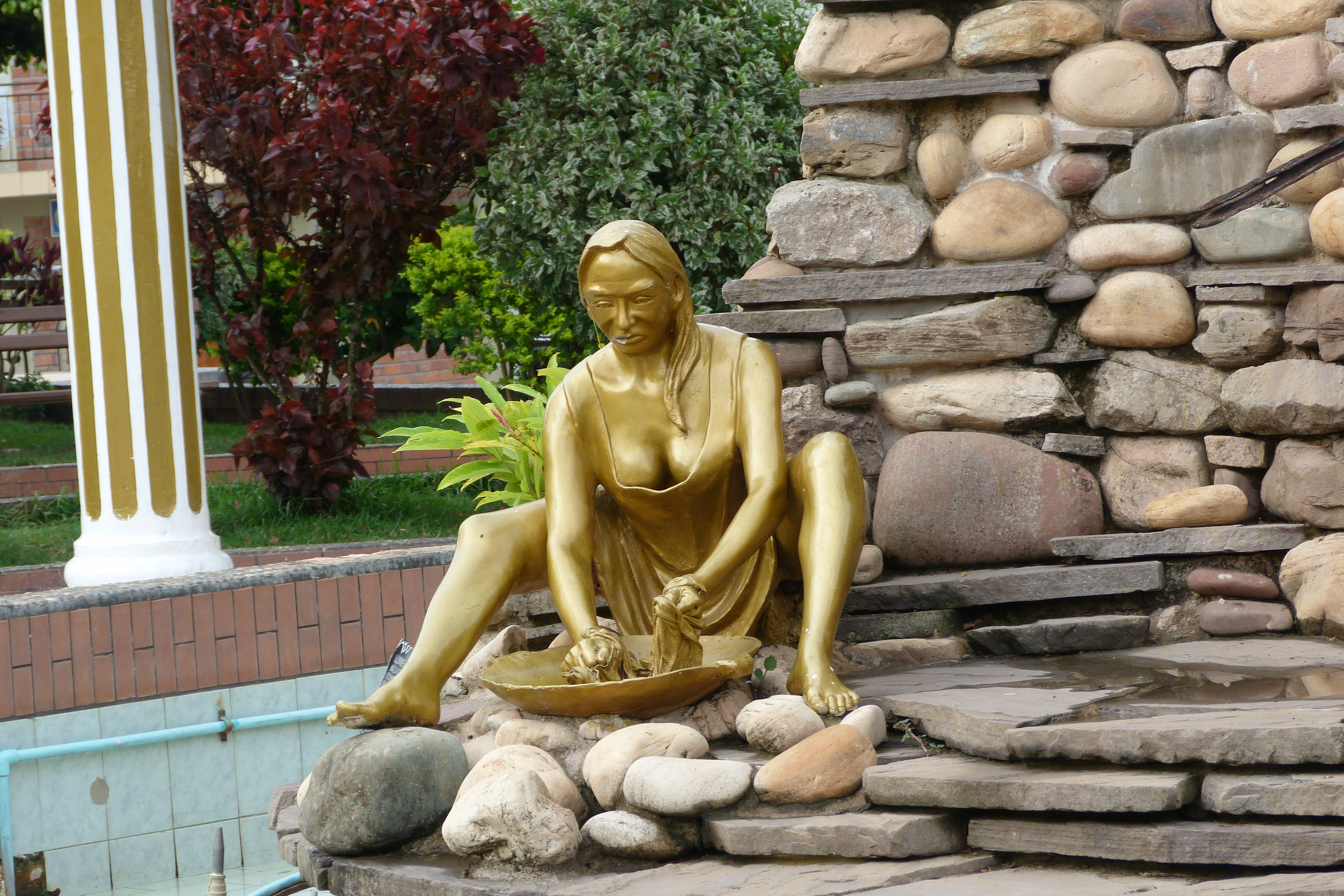
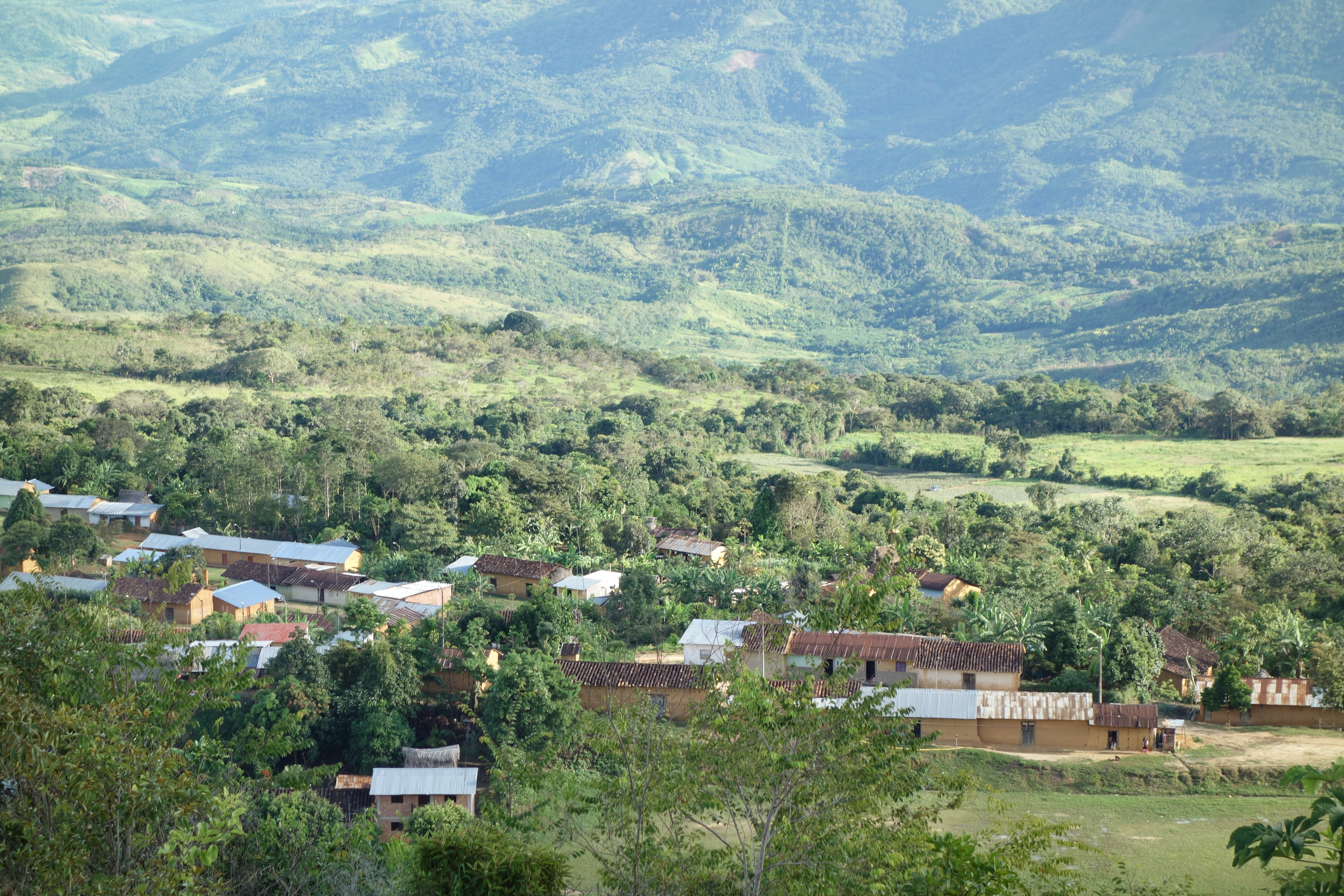
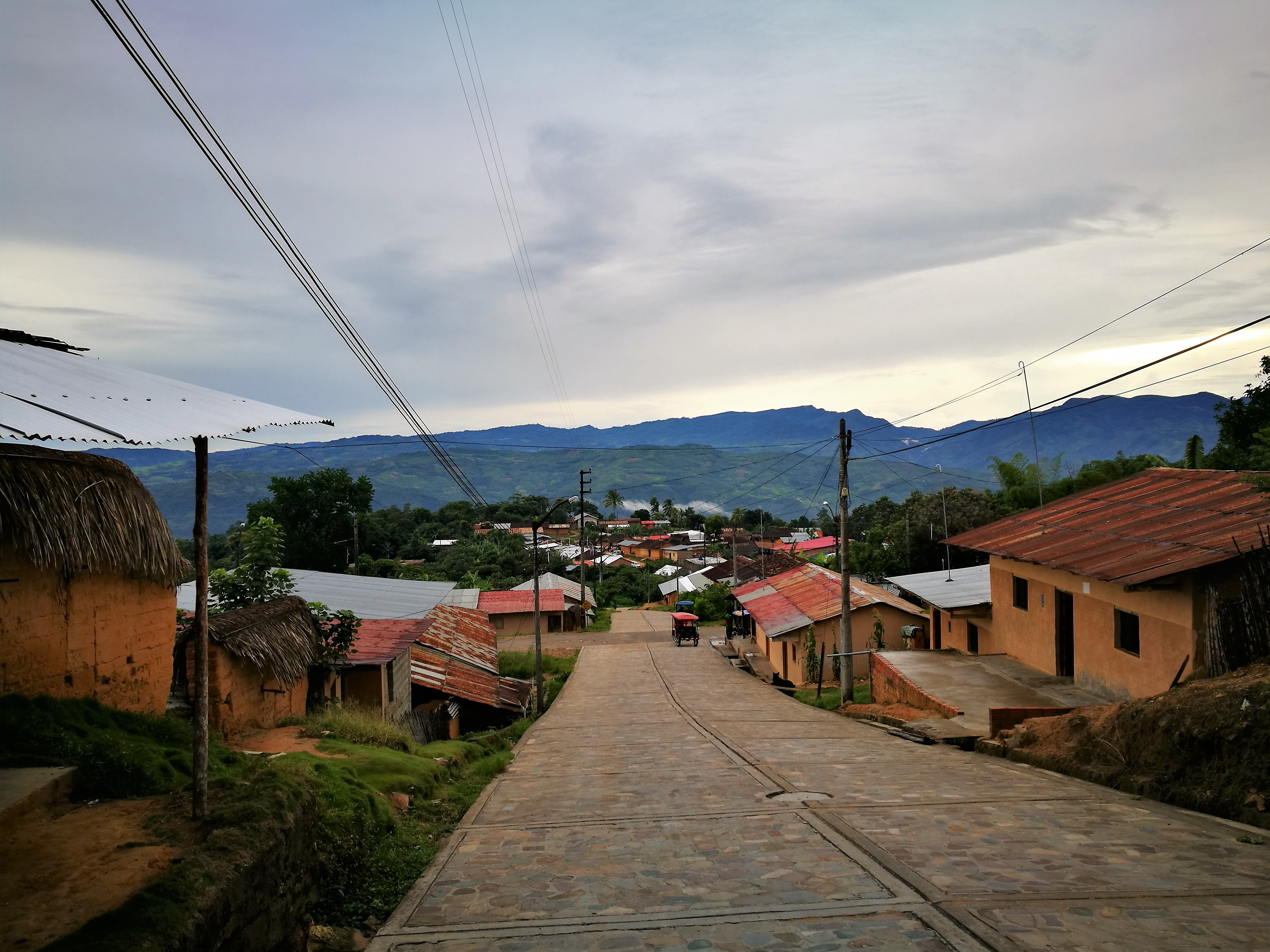

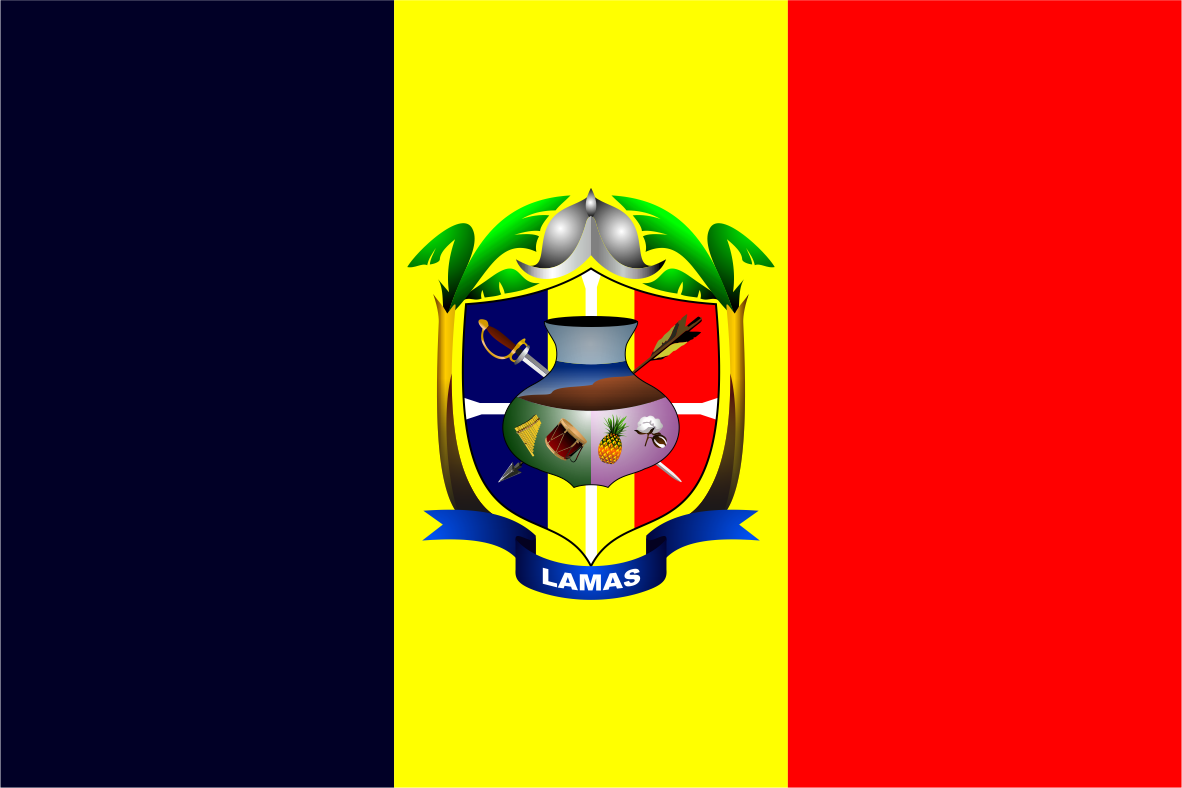
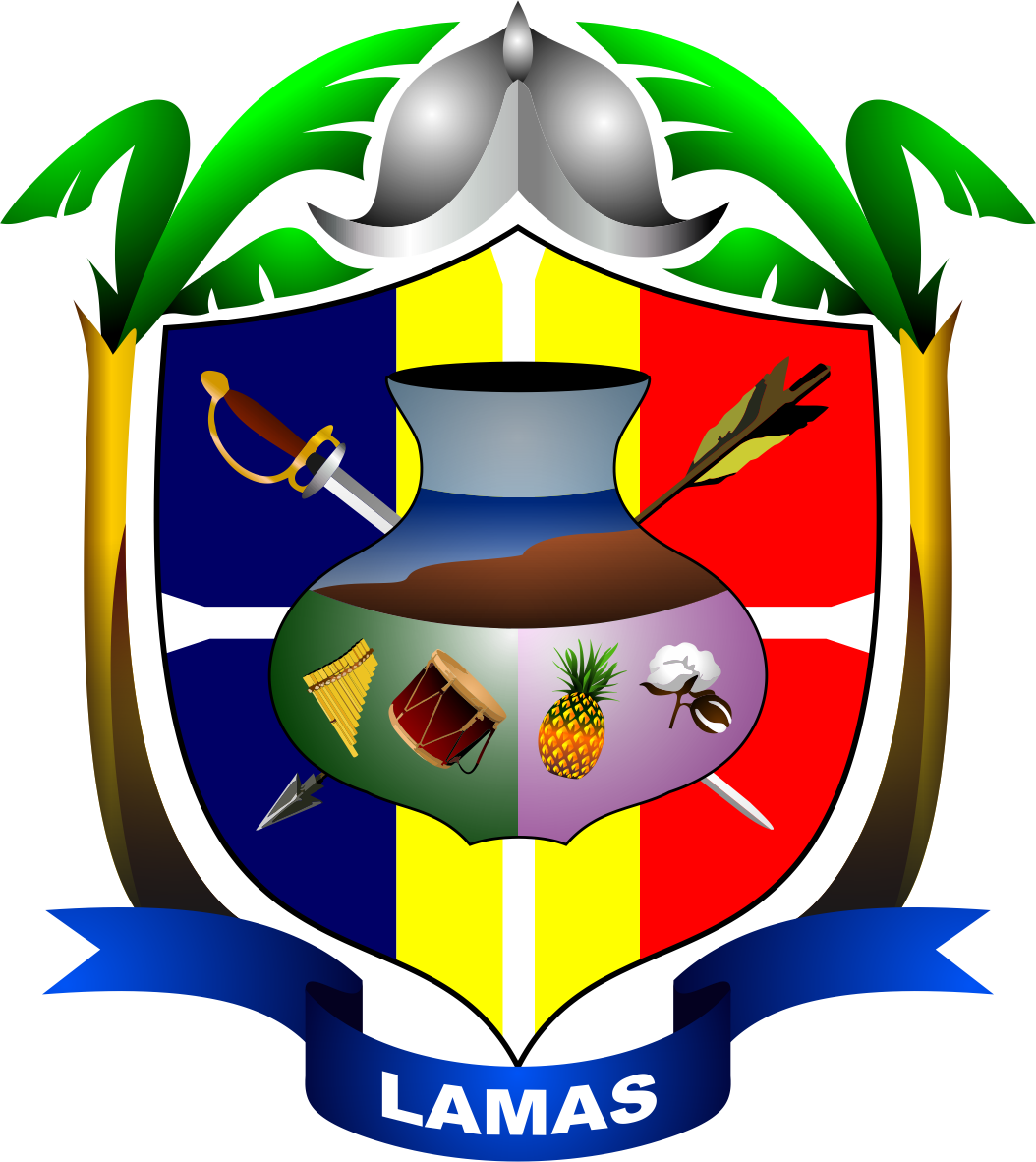
- Flag Seal
- Nickname: Capital folclórica de la Amazonía Peruana (Folkloric capital of the Peruvian Amazon)
- Location within Peru
- Coordinates: 6°25′S 76°32′W
- Country: Peru
- Region: San Martín
- Province: Lamas
- District: Lamas

Government
  - Mayor: Onésimo Huamán
- Elevation: 809 m (2,654 ft)

Population (2007)
  - Total: 16,871
- Time zone: UTC-5 (PET)

Lamas is the capital of the Lamas Province, situated in the San Martín Region of northern Peru. There are 16,871 inhabitants, according to the 2007 census. The city is the original home of the Kichwa-Lamista people. The 2005 northern Peru earthquake shook Lamas, killing 5 people and injuring 174; hundreds were left homeless.

== History ==
Lamas has been conquered twice. The first time was for those Pocras and the group of those Hanan Chancas who when being defeated supposedly in the battle of Yahuarpampa for the troops of the Inca Pachacútec in 1438 and conquered their territories natives like Ayacucho, they abandoned their territory and they went into the forest. In their trajectory they found a favorable area to be located, the hill where today the city is located of Lamas, which was inhabited by one of the indigenous groups of the area. Ankoallo, leader of the Pocras, is considered to be the founder of the town of Lamas.

== Climate ==
Climate data for Lamas, elevation 840 m (2,760 ft), (1991–2020)
| Month | Jan | Feb | Mar | Apr | May | Jun | Jul | Aug | Sep | Oct | Nov | Dec | Year |
|---|---|---|---|---|---|---|---|---|---|---|---|---|---|
| Mean daily maximum °C (°F) | 28.8 (83.8) | 28.4 (83.1) | 28.2 (82.8) | 28.0 (82.4) | 27.8 (82.0) | 27.5 (81.5) | 27.7 (81.9) | 28.9 (84.0) | 29.3 (84.7) | 29.2 (84.6) | 29.2 (84.6) | 28.8 (83.8) | 28.5 (83.3) |
| Mean daily minimum °C (°F) | 20.8 (69.4) | 20.6 (69.1) | 20.5 (68.9) | 20.4 (68.7) | 20.2 (68.4) | 19.7 (67.5) | 19.3 (66.7) | 19.7 (67.5) | 20.0 (68.0) | 20.4 (68.7) | 20.8 (69.4) | 20.8 (69.4) | 20.3 (68.5) |
| Average precipitation mm (inches) | 109.4 (4.31) | 132.9 (5.23) | 152.6 (6.01) | 142.6 (5.61) | 119.6 (4.71) | 78.5 (3.09) | 81.3 (3.20) | 56.6 (2.23) | 100.5 (3.96) | 126.2 (4.97) | 118.7 (4.67) | 107.6 (4.24) | 1,326.5 (52.23) |
Source: National Meteorology and Hydrology Service of Peru
