= Taxonomy of the Orchidaceae =

Classification of orchids

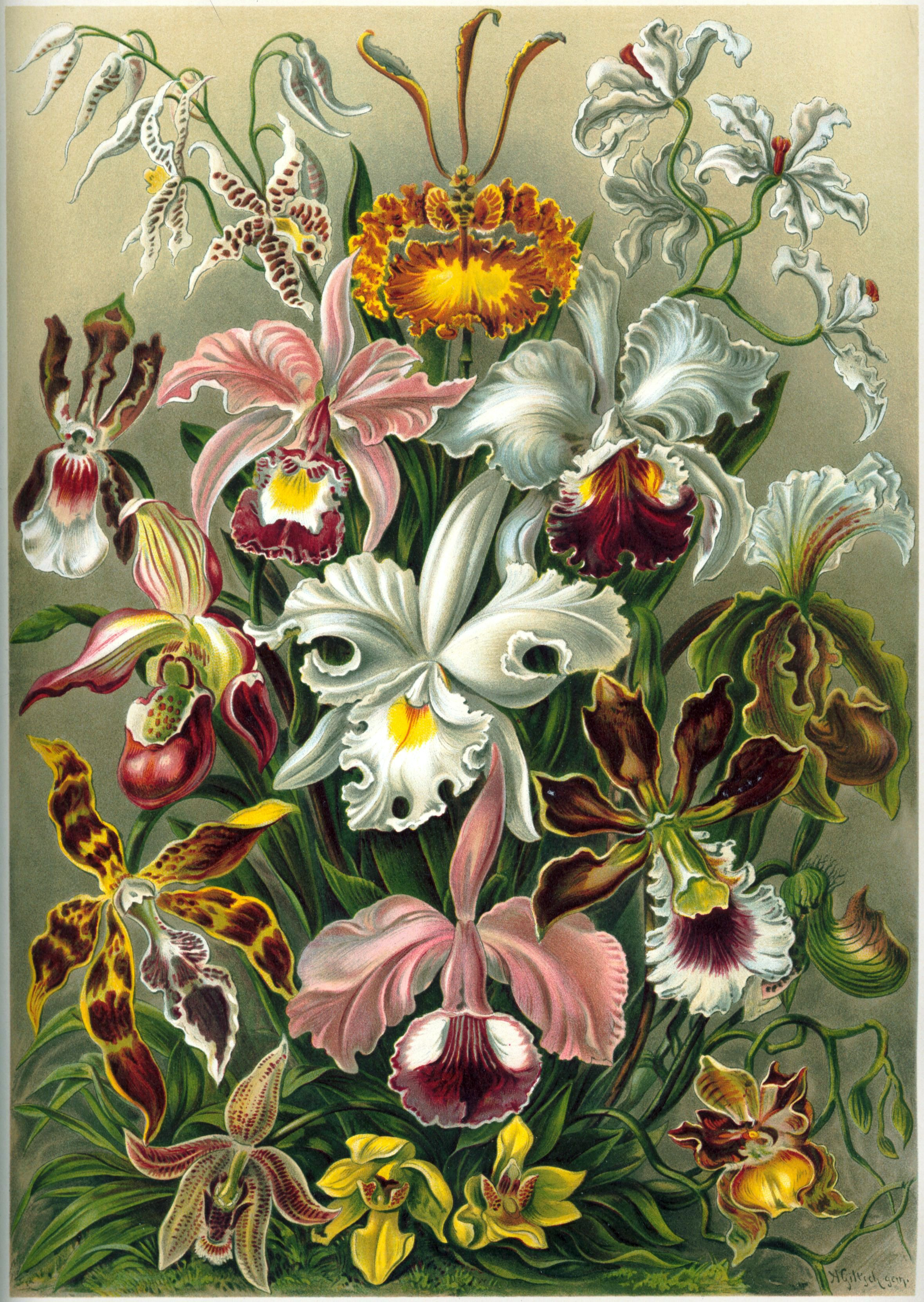
Illustration of "Orchideae" from Ernst Haeckel's Kunstformen der Natur

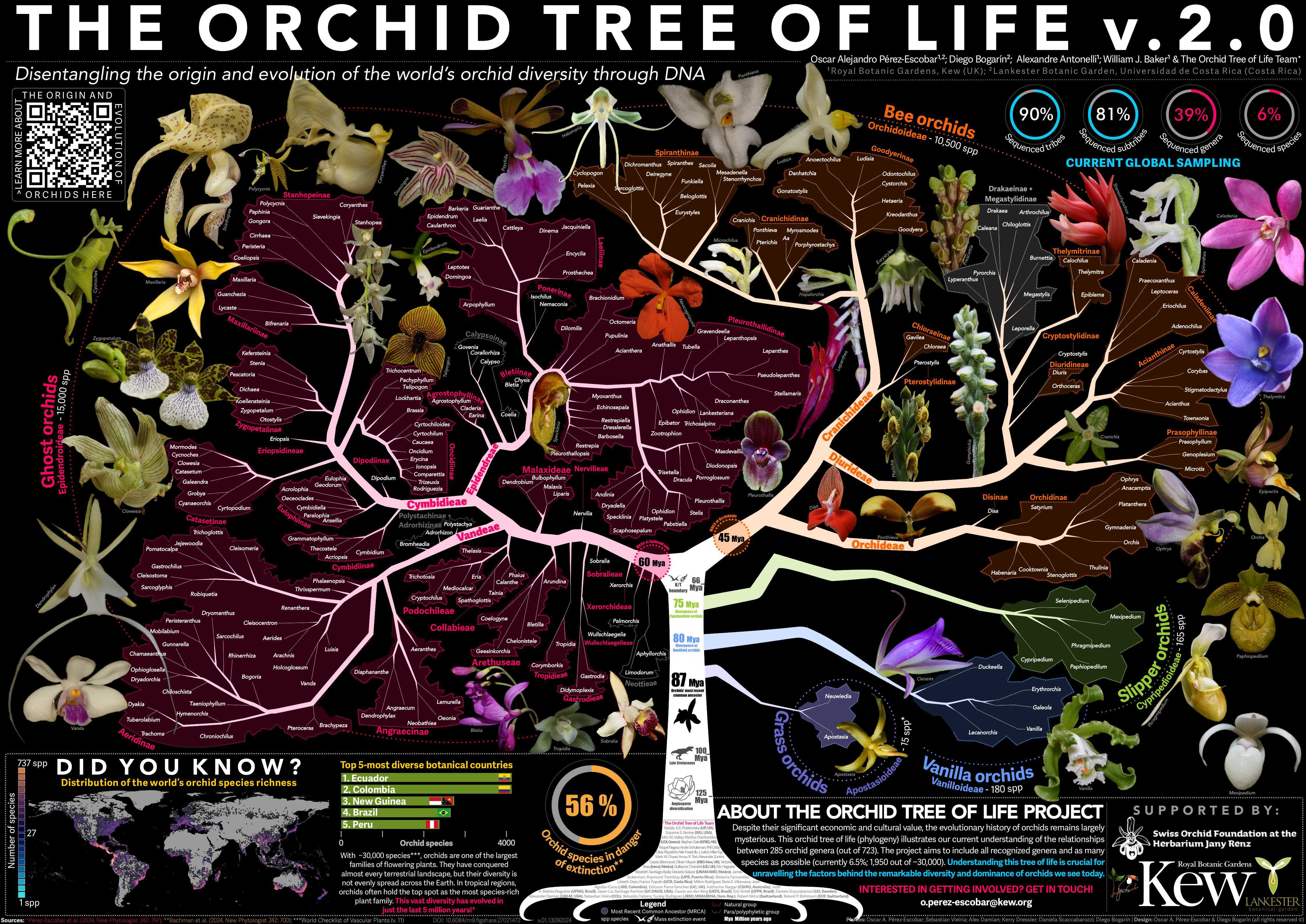
Artist's interpretation of orchid phylogeny

The taxonomy of the Orchidaceae (orchid family) has evolved slowly during the last 250 years, starting with Carl Linnaeus who in 1753 recognized eight genera. De Jussieu recognized the Orchidaceae as a separate family in his Genera Plantarum in 1789. Olof Swartz recognized 25 genera in 1800. Louis Claude Richard provided us in 1817 with the descriptive terminology of the orchids. (See External links below). The next step was taken in 1830-1840 by John Lindley, who recognized four subfamilies. He is generally recognized as the father of orchid taxonomy. The next important step was taken by George Bentham with a new classification, recognizing subtribes for the first time. This classification was first presented in a paper that Bentham read to the Royal Society in 1881. Then it was published in 1883 in the final volume of Genera Plantarum. The next great contributors were Pfitzer (1887), Schlechter (1926), Mansfeld (1937), Dressler and Dodson (1960), Garay (1960, 1972), Vermeulen (1966), again Dressler (1981). and Burns-Balogh and Funk (1986). Dressler's 1993 book had considerable influence on later work.

Genera Orchidacearum was published in 6 volumes over 15 years, from 1999 to 2014. It covers all of the known orchids, including a description of each genus. It reflects the considerable progress in orchid taxonomy that had been made since Dressler published his classification in 1993. In the 1990s, orchid taxonomy began to be influenced by molecular phylogenetics based on DNA sequences. The first molecular phylogenetic study to include a substantial sample of orchids was published in 1999. The first classification that was based on cladistic analysis of DNA data was published by Chase et alii in 2003.

An update to that classification was published by Chase et alii in 2015. This classification takes a different approach from Genera Orchidacearum, by consolidating many of the tribes and subtribes, and by recognizing very widely circumscribed genera. As of 2015, Orchidaceae was not yet covered in The Families and Genera of Vascular Plants, though most of the vascular plant families had been covered by that time.

The number of genera recognized in the family has varied from one classification to another. In Genera Orchidacearum, many genera were consolidated, reducing their number to 765, smaller than in any previous modern classification. In 2015, Chase et alii merged even more genera, reducing their number to 736.

Useful resources include the World Checklist of Selected Plant Families. Wikispecies (Orchidaceae) closely follows this source with modifications as they become accepted. The Plant List also has lists of genera and species, but no other taxonomic information.

== History ==
The following taxonomy follows largely the classification system of Robert Louis Dressler, an orchid specialist and adjunct curator at the Florida Museum of Natural History. This classification, published in 1981 in the book The Orchids: Natural History and Classification, was widely accepted by botanists and growers before the publication of Genera Orchidacearum. The initial scheme of 1981 was modified in 1986, twice in 1990, and then again in 1993. This comprehensive classification relies heavily on morphology, especially a few key characters, such as anther configuration and pollinarium structure. Consequently, many of the taxa are not monophyletic.

Cladistic analyses, especially those based on molecular data, provide a firmer basis for classification than intuition, and the certainty (or uncertainty) of conclusions can be quantified by measures of statistical support. While our understanding of orchid phylogeny has greatly improved in recent years, the elucidation of orchid relationships is still ongoing.

When Dressler published his classification in 1993, the relationships of orchids to other monocots was still unknown. Some of the first molecular phylogenetic studies of monocots resolved the Orchidaceae as sister to the astelioid clade of the order Asparagales, but this result never had strong statistical support. It is now known that Orchidaceae is the most basal clade in Asparagales, with the astelioid clade diverging next.

According to cladistic analyses based on morphological character states or on nucleotide sequences, the orchid family is a monophyletic group. The subfamilies recognized by Dressler, however, were not all monophyletic. Dressler's delimitation of subfamilies was contradicted by subsequent studies of mitochondrial, chloroplast, and nuclear DNA sequences. In 2003, a new phylogenetic classification divided Orchidaceae into five subfamilies: Apostasioideae, Vanilloideae, Cypripedioideae, Orchidoideae, and Epidendroideae. These five subfamilies were all strongly supported as monophyletic groups in subsequent studies.

In 2003, the position of Vanilloideae remained equivocal. The subfamilies Orchidoideae and Epidendroideae clearly formed a monophyletic group and Dressler believed that their closest relative was Vanilloideae. In 2006, a study based on the plastid genes rbcL and atpB found the closest relative of this pair to be Cypripedioideae, rather than Vanilloideae. This result had only weak maximum parsimony jackknife support, but in a phylogenomic study in 2015, it received strong maximum likelihood bootstrap support.

Since 2006, phylogenies of two of the subfamilies, Vanilloideae and Epidendroideae have been published. Phylogenies of several tribes and subtribes have also been published. Compared to previous classifications, more of the tribes and subtribes of Dressler were monophyletic, but not all of them were supported by subsequent studies.

In the classification that was published in 2015, the authors expressed doubt about their division of the tribes Orchideae and Vandeae into subtribes. The placement of the genera Pachites, Holothrix, and Hederorkis is especially problematic. The monophyly of the subtribe Cranichidinae is also in doubt. These authors singled out the tribe Podochileae, as well as the subtribes Oncidiinae, Goodyerinae, and Angraecinae as being in special need of phylogenetic study. The basal epidendroids, especially the tribe Gastrodieae, remain poorly sampled in phylogenetic studies.

== Taxonomy ==
The orchid family (Orchidaceae) is subdivided into five subfamilies, and then into tribes and subtribes. Groups of closely related genera are sometimes referred to informally as alliances. An alliance is a group of taxa, at any taxonomic rank, but usually at the rank of genus or species, that are thought to be closely related. Alliances are designated provisionally and are not recognized in the ICNAFP.

The subtribes are formally divided into genera. Some of the genera are divided into subgenera, and some of the subgenera are divided into sections. All of the genera contain at least one species. A special nomenclature is used to name hybrids between different species.

About 150 species and about a dozen new genera were described each year from 2000 to 2015.

According to Dressler, there are 5 subfamilies, 22 tribes, 70 subtribes, and about 850 genera of orchids. When he published his classification, only about 20,000 species of orchids were known. Several thousand have been described since then.

A distinction between monandrous flowers and others is especially important in the classification of orchids. A monandrous flower is one that has only a single stamen. The flowers are monandrous in the subfamilies Vanilloideae, Orchidoideae, and Epidendroideae. Like many others before him, Dressler believed that the monandrous orchids form a monophyletic group. It is now known that monandry arose twice in the orchids, once in Vanilloideae, and again in the common ancestor of Orchidoideae and Epidendroideae. The other subfamilies, Apostasioideae and Cypripedioideae, have either three stamens or two stamens and a staminode.

The following subfamilies are recognized:

- Subfamily Apostasioideae: monophyletic - the most basal of the orchids: three fertile anthers, or two fertile anthers and a filamentous staminode.
- Subfamily Cypripedioideae: monophyletic - two fertile diandrous anthers, a shield-shaped staminode and a saccate (= pouch-like) lip.
- Subfamily Orchidoideae: monophyletic - one fertile, monandrous, basitonic anther.
  - (Subfamily Spiranthoideae): now accepted as nested within a more broadly defined Orchidoideae as the sub-tribe Spiranthinae of the tribe Cranichideae.
- Subfamily Epidendroideae: monophyletic - includes almost 80% of the orchid species; orchids with an incumbent to suberect (= ascending towards the edges) anther.
  - (Subfamily Higher Epidendroideae (formerly Vandoideae): specialised clade within a more broadly defined Epidendroideae
- Subfamily Vanilloideae: monophyletic - an ancient clade now recognized as a distinct subfamily. Their phylogenetic position had long been controversial.

Cladistically, the interrelationships of these subfamilies can be shown in a phylogenetic tree as follows:

- Asparagales
  - - Other families in the Asparagales
  - Orchidaceae
    - Apostasioideae
    - - Vanilloideae
      - - Cypripedioideae
        - - Epidendroideae
          - Orchidoideae

== Subfamily Apostasioideae ==
The subfamily Apostasioideae belongs to the orchid family (Orchidaceae). All well-sampled molecular phylogenetic studies have produced strong bootstrap support for its position as sister to a clade consisting of the other orchid subfamilies. Bootstraping is a method of resampling for quantifying the statistical support for nodes in a phylogenetic tree (= a treelike diagram showing the evolutionary diversification of organisms).

The apostasioid orchids are the most primitive orchids, with only two genera. Neuwiedia has three fertile, abaxial (= facing away from the stem) anthers, while Apostasia has two fertile abaxial anthers and a filamentous staminode (= a sterile stamen). Plants with mealy or paste-like pollen, which ordinarily are not aggregated into pellets, called pollinia, with two or three fertile long anthers, leaves with sheathing bases, elongated staminode and labellum similar to the petals.

These primitive features make them, according to some authorities, not true orchids but rather ancestors of modern orchids. However, more recent studies indicate that many of their differences with the other orchids were not inherited from a common ancestor with orchids, but arose within the stem group of apostasioid orchids.

Apostasia Blume, included Adactylus Rolfe and Mesodactylis Wall.
Neuwiedia Blume

== Subfamily Cypripedioideae ==
6 genera with about 115 species, mostly terrestrials or lithophytes:

=== Tribe Cypripedieae ===
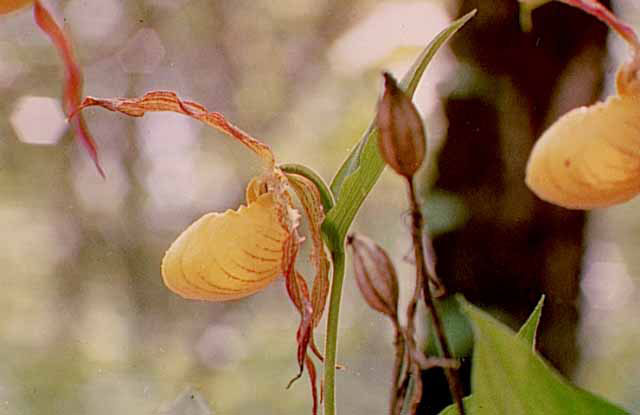
Lady's slipper orchid (Cypripedium pubescens)

Subtribe Cypripediinae

Cypripedium Lindl., included Arietinum Beck, Calceolaria Heist. ex Fabr., Calceolus Nieuwl., Ciripedium Zumagl., Criogenes Salisb., Fissipes Small, Hypodema Rchb., Sacodon Raf., Schizopedium Salisb., Stimegas Raf.

Subtribe Paphiopedilinae

Paphiopedilum Pfitzer, included Cordula Raf. and Menephora Raf.

=== Tribe Mexipedieae ===
Subtribe Mexipediinae

Mexipedium V.A.Albert & M.W.Chase

=== Tribe Phragmipedieae ===
Subtribe Phragmipediinae

Phragmipedium Rolfe, included Phragmopedilum Pfitzer, Uropedium Lindl.

=== Tribe Selenipedieae ===
Subtribe Selenipediinae

Selenipedium Rchb.f.

=== Others ===
× Phragmipaphium hort.

== Subfamily Epidendroideae ==
This is the largest subfamily, comprising more than 10,000 species in about 90 to 100 genera. Most are tropical epiphytes (usually with pseudobulbs), but some are terrestrials and even a few are myco-heterotrophs. All show a unique development of the single anther: it is incumbent, meaning that it forms a right angle with the column axis or pointed backward in many genera. Most have hard pollinia, i.e. a mass of waxy pollen or of coherent pollen grains; pollinia with caudicle and viscidium or without; stigma entire or 3-lobed; rostellum present; 1-locular ovary; leaves: distichous or spiraling

=== Tribe Arethuseae ===
Over 500 species.

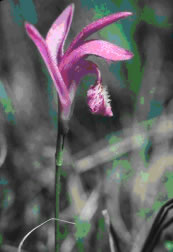
Dragon's mouth orchid (Arethusa bulbosa)

Subtribe Arethusinae

Arethusa L.
× Elearethusa
× Elecalthusa
Eleorchis F.Maek.
× Elepogon

Subtribe Bletiinae

Ancistrochilus Rolfe
Anthogonium Wall. ex Lindl.
Cephalantheropsis Guillaumin
Eriodes Rolfe, included Neotainiopsis Bennet & Raizada, Tainiopsis Schltr.
Hancockia Rolfe
Hexalectris Raf.
Ipsea Lindl.
Mischobulbum Schltr., included Mischobulbon Schltr. (orth. var.)
Nephelaphyllum Blume
Pachystoma Blume, included Apaturia Lindl., Pachychilus Blume and Pachystylis Blume

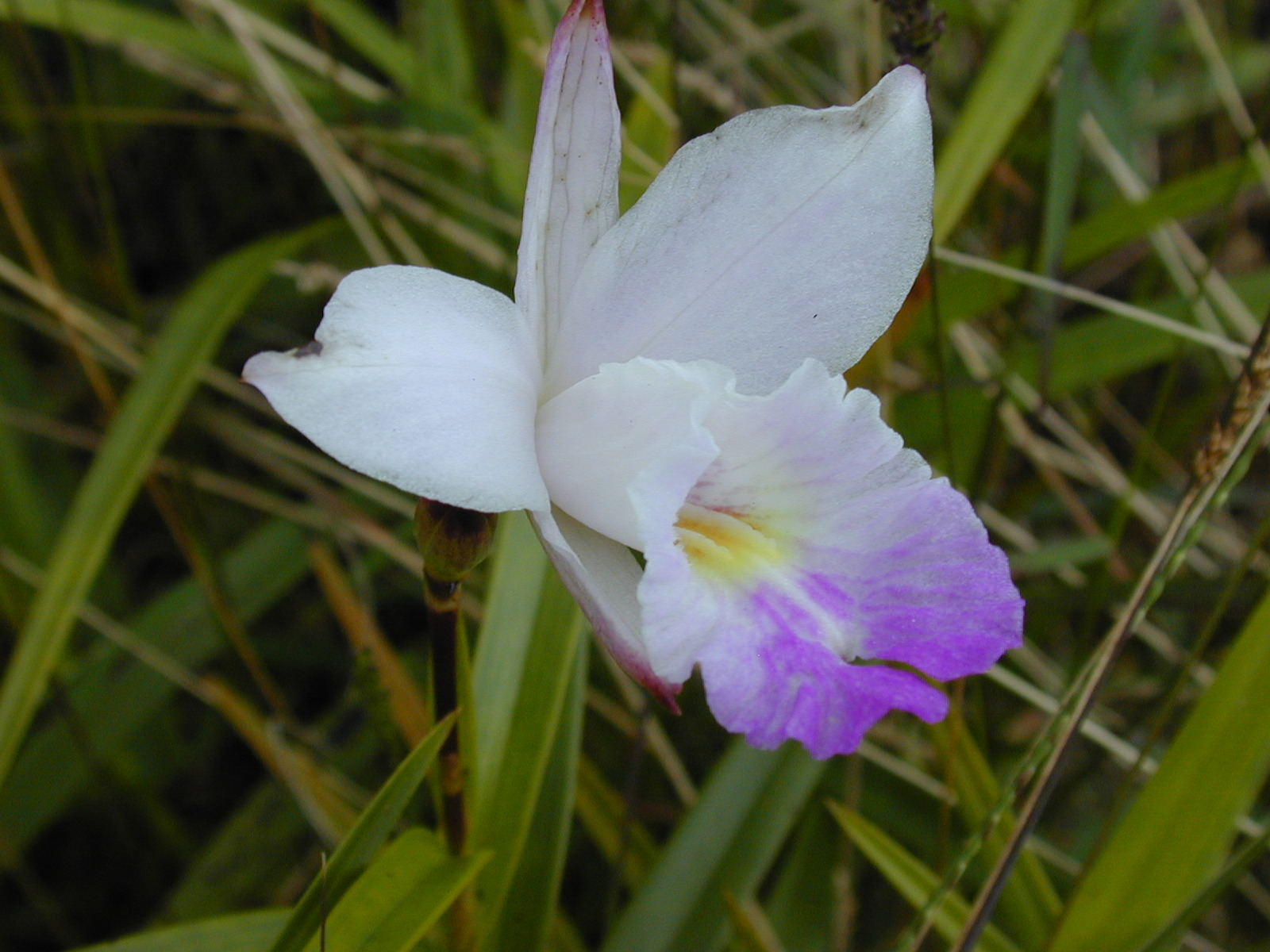
Bamboo orchid (Arundina graminifolia)

Alliance Arundina

Arundina Rich.

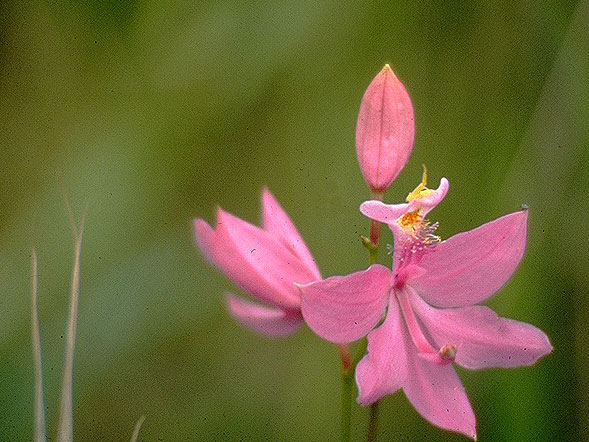
Tuberous grasspink (Calopogon tuberosus var. tuberosus)

Alliance Calopogon

Calopogon R.Br., included Cathea Salisb., Helleborine Kuntze

Alliance Calanthe

Acanthophippium Blume, included Acanthophippium Blume (orth. var.)
Bletia Ruiz & Pav., included Anthogyas Raf., Bletiana Raf., Crybe Lindl., Gyas Salisb., Regnellia Barb. Rodr., Thiebautia Colla
Bletilla Rchb.f., included Jimensia Raf., Polytoma Lour. ex Gomes
Calanthe R.Br., included Alismorkis Thouars, Amblyglottis Blume, Aulostylis Schltr., Calanthidum Pfitzer, Centrosia A.Rich., Centrosis Thouars, Cytheris Lindl., Ghiesbreghtia A.Rich. & Galeotti, Limatodes Blume, Paracalanthe Kudô, Preptanthe Rchb.f., Styloglossum Breda, Sylvalismis Thouars
Phaius Lour., included Cyanorchis Thouars, Gastorchis Thouars, Gastrorchis Schltr., Hecabe Raf., Pachyne Salisb., Pesomeria Lindl., Tankervillia Link
Spathoglottis Blume, included Paxtonia Lindl.

Alliance Coelia

Coelia Lindl., included Bothriochilus Lem.

Alliance Chysis

Chysis Lindl., included Thorvaldsenia Liebm.

Alliance Plocoglottis

Plocoglottis Blume

Alliance Tainia

Tainia Blume, included Ania Lindl., Ascotainia Ridl., Mitopetalum Blume

Subtribe Sobraliinae

Sobralia Ruiz & Pav., included Cyathoglottis Poepp. & Endl., Fregea Rchb.f., Lindsayella Ames & C.Schweinf.

Subtribe Thuniinae

Thunia Rchb.f.

=== Tribe Calypsoeae ===
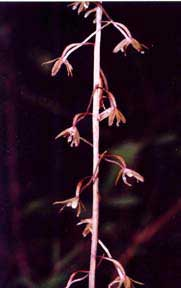
Cranefly orchid (Tipularia discolor)

Aplectrum (Nutt.) Torr.
Calypso, included Calypsodium Link, Cytherea Salisb., Norna Wahlenb., Orchidium Sw.
Tipularia Nutt., included Anthericlis Raf., Plecturus Raf.
Wullschlaegelia Rchb.f.

=== Tribe Cryptarrheneae ===
Cryptarrhena R.Br., included Orchidofunckia A.Rich. & Galeotti

=== Tribe Coelogyneae ===
Over 400 species

Subtribe Adrorhizinae

Adrorhizon Hook.f.

Subtribe Coelogyninae

Coelogyne Lindl., included Bolborchis Lindl., Hologyne Pfitzer, Ptychogyne Pfitzer
Dendrochilum Blume, included Acoridium Nees & Meyen, Platyclinis Benth.
Pleione D.Don

=== Tribe Epidendreae ===
Cosmopolitan; largest tribe of this subfamily, with over 8,000 species

Subtribe Glomerinae

Agrostophyllum Blume
Earina Lindl.
Glomera Blume, included Ischnocentrum Schltr.,Sepalosiphon Schltr.

Subtribe Laeliinae: over 1400 species, mostly tropical American epiphytes, in 43 genera. It contains more than 25% (136) of all hybrid genera.

Alliance Isochilus

Hexisea Lindl., included Costaricaea Schltr., Euothonaea Rchb.f.,
Isochilus R.Br.

Alliance Cattleya

Brassavola R.Br., included Eudisanthema Neck. ex Post & Kuntze, Lysimnia Raf., Tulexis Raf.
Broughtonia R.Br., included Cattleyopsis Lem., Laeliopsis Lindl. & Paxton
Cattleya Lindl., included Maelenia Dumort.
Encyclia Hook., included Amblostoma Scheidw., Dinema Lindl., Hormidium (Lindl.) Heynh., Sulpitia Raf.
Laelia Lindl., included Amalia Rchb.
Myrmecophila Rolfe
Rhyncholaelia Schltr.
Schomburgkia Lindl.
Sophronitis Lindl., included Lophoglottis Raf., Sophronia Lindl.
Guarianthe Dressler & W.E. Higgins (2003)

Alliance Barkeria

Barkeria Knowles & Westc.
Caularthron Raf., included Diacrium (Lindl.) Benth.

Alliance Epidendrum

Epidendrum Jacq., included Amphiglottis Salisb., Anacheilium Hoffmanns., Anocheil' Hoffmanns. ex Rchb., Auliza Small, Coilostylis Raf., Didothion Raf., Diothonea Lindl., Dothilophis Raf., Doxosma Raf., Epicladium Small, Epidanthus L.O.Williams, Epidendropsis Garay & Dunst., Exophya Raf., Hemiscleria Lindl., Kalopternix Garay & Dunst., Lanium (Lindl.) Benth., Larnandra Raf., Microepidendrum Brieger (nom. inval.), Minicolumna Brieger (nom. inval.), Nanodes Lindl., Neolehmannia Kraenzl., Neowilliamsia Garay, Nyctosma Raf., Phadrosanthus Neck. ex Raf., Physinga Lindl., Pleuranthium Benth., Prosthechea Knowles & Westc., Pseudepidendrum Rchb.f., Seraphyta Fisch. & C.A.Mey., Spathiger Small, Stenoglossum Kunth, Tritelandra Raf.

Alliance Leptotes

Leptotes Lindl.

Alliance Neocogniauxia

Neocogniauxia Schltr.
Dilomilis Raf.
Tomzanonia Nir

Alliance hybrids

× Brassocattleya hort.
× Brassoepidendrum hort.
× Brassolaeliocattleya hort.
× Cattleytonia hort.
× Cattlianthe J.M.H.Shaw
× Epicattleya hort.
× Epilaeliocattleya hort.
× Laeliocatarthron J.M.H.Shaw
× Laeliocatonia hort.
× Laeliocattleya Rolfe
× Otaara hort.
× Potinara hort.
× Rhyncholaeliocattleya H.G.Jones
× Schombocattleya hort.
× Sophrocattleya Rolfe
× Sophrolaelia hort.
× Sophrolaeliocattleya hort.

Subtribe Meiracyllinae

Meiracyllium Rchb.f.

Subtribe Pleurothallidinae: These species have single leaves, non-pseudobulbous ramicauls, articulated ovary, deciduous from the pedicel.

- Genera: Acianthera, Acostaea, Anathallis, Barbosella, Barbrodria, Brachionidium, Chamelophyton, Condylago, Draconanthes, Dracula, Dresslerella, Dryadella, Echinosepala, Frondaria, Jostia, Lepanthes, Lepanthopsis, Luerella, Masdevallia, Myoxanthus, Octomeria, Ophidion, Pabstiella, Phloeophila, Platystele, Pleurothallis, Porroglossum, Restrepia, Restrepiella, Salpistele, Scaphosepalum, Specklinia, Stelis, Teagueia, Trichosalpinx, Trisetella, Zootrophion

=== Tribe Epipogieae ===
- Genera: Epipogium, Stereosandra

=== Tribe Gastrodieae ===
- Subtribe Gastrodiinae
  - Genera: Didymoplexis, Gastrodia
- Subtribe Nerviliinae
  - Genus: Nervilia
- Subtribe Rhizanthellinae (sometimes in Diurideae)
  - Genera: Cryptanthemis, Rhizanthella

=== Tribe Malaxideae ===
Over 900 species

- Genera: Liparis, Malaxis

=== Tribe Neottieae ===
About 100 species

- Subtribe Limodorinae
  - Genera: Aphyllorchis, Cephalanthera, Epipactis, Limodorum
- Subtribe Listerinae
  - Genus: Listera

=== Tribe Podochileae ===
- Subtribe Bulbophyllinae (according to Garay & al. 1994)
  - Genera: Acrochaene Lindl., Bulbophyllum Thouars, Chaseella Summerhays, Cirrhopetalum Lindl., Codonosiphon Schl., Drymoda Lindl., Epicrianthes Blume, Ferruminaria Garay, Hamer & Siegerist, Hapalochilus (Schlechter) Senghas, Ione Lindl., Mastigion Garay, Hamer & Siegerist , Monomeria Lindl., Monosepalum Schle, Osyricera Blume, Pedilochilus Schl., Rhytionanthos Garay, Hamer & Siegerist, Saccoglossum Schl., Sunipia Lindl., Synarmosepalum Garay, Hamer & Siegerist, Tapeinoglossum Schl., Trias Lindl., Vesicisepalum Garay, Hamer & Siegerist

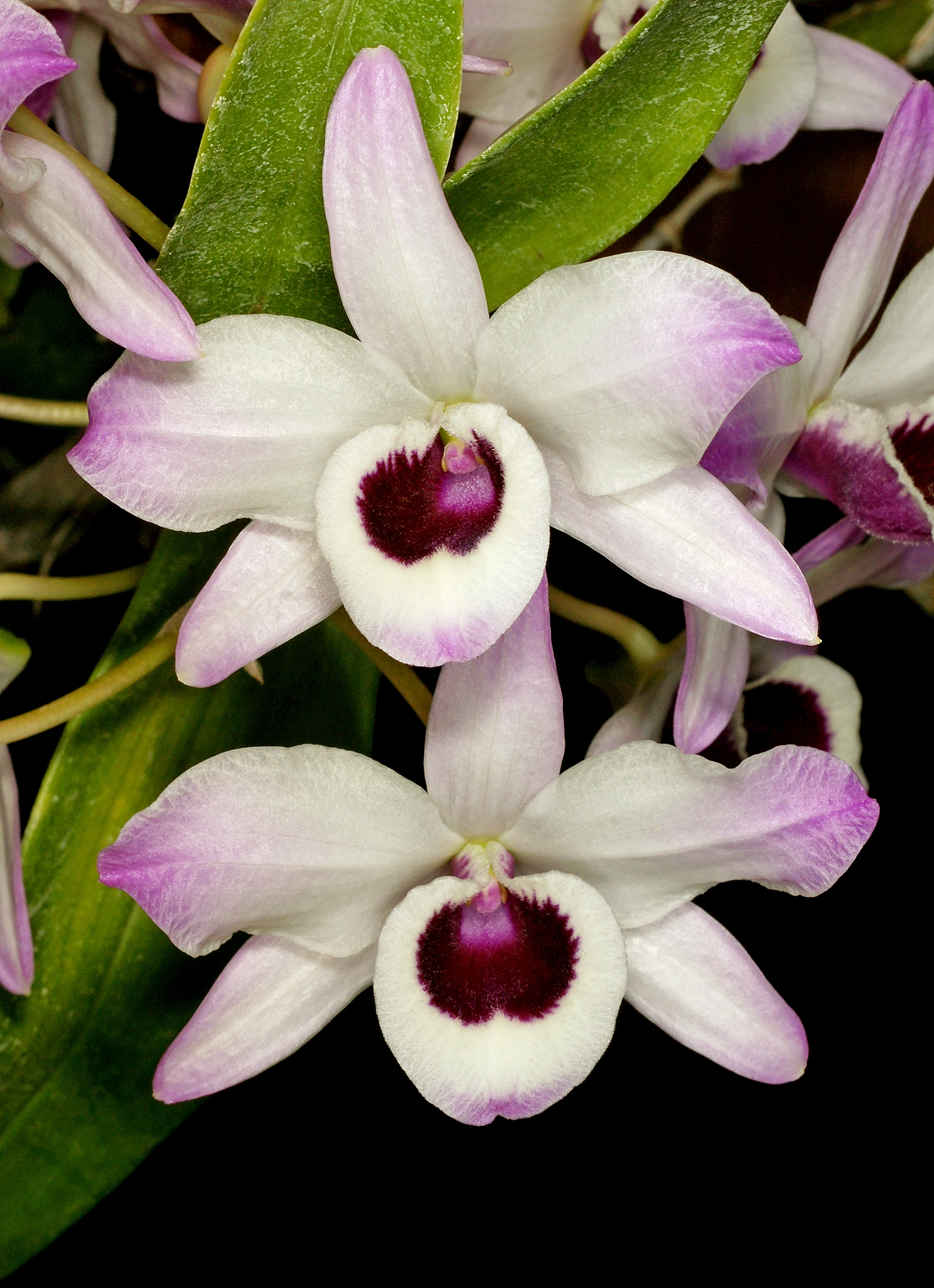
Dendrobium nobile

- Subtribe Dendrobiinae
  - Genera: Cadetia, Dendrobium, Diplocaulobium, Epigeneium, Flickingeria, Pseuderia
- Subtribe Eriinae
  - Alliance Eria
    - Genera: Eria, Trichotosia
  - Alliance Ceratostylis
    - Genera: Appendicula, Ceratostylis, Epiblastus, Sarcostoma
- Subtribe Podochilinae
  - Genera: Chilopogon, Podochilus
- Subtribe Thelasiinae
  - Genera: Phreatia, Rhynchophreatia

=== Tribe Triphoreae ===
A primitive tribe consisting of three genera and twenty species recently assigned to Epidendroideae.

- Genera: Monophyllorchis, Psilochilus, Triphora

=== Tribe Tropidieae ===
Formerly placed in the subfamily Spiranthoideae

- Genera: Corymborkis, Tropidia

=== Tribe Xerorchideae ===
- Genus: Xerorchis

== Subfamily Higher Epidendroideae ==
Formerly called Vandoideae, this is the second largest subfamily with over 300 genera in more than 5,000 species. They are mostly epiphytes, but include some terrestrials and myco-heterotrophs, all occurring in most tropical areas. The main stem grows in a single direction. Many of the species develop pseudobulbs (i.e. a bulge at the base of a stem), that are normally shorter and sturdier than those in the epidendroids. The striking characteristics of the vandoids are a cellular pollinium stalk (= stipe), superposed pollinia and the unique development of the incumbent anther, that bends early in development.

=== Tribe Cymbidieae ===
About 1,800 species in 100 to 130 genera. Species are either terrestrial or epiphytic, and range throughout global tropical regions. All species have, as a unique feature, a sympodial growth habit and two pollinia.

- Subtribe Acriopsidinae: less than 50 species.
  - Genus: Acriopsis
- Subtribe Catasetinae: about 150 species; epiphytes occurring in the Western Hemisphere.
  - Genera: Catasetum, Cycnoches, Mormodes
- Subtribe Cyrtopodiinae: over 400 species, usually terrestrial; Asia, Africa, and tropical America.
  - Alliance Bromheadia
    - Genus: Bromheadia
  - Alliance Eulophia
    - Genus: Eulophia
  - Alliance Cyrtopodium
    - Genera: Cymbidiella, Cyrtopodium, Galeandra
  - Alliance Cymbidium
    - Genera: Ansellia, Cymbidium, Grammatophyllum
  - Alliance Dipodium
    - Genus: Dipodium
  - Alliance hybrids
    - Genera: × Bifrenidium, × Cymphiella, × Cyrtellia, × Eulocymbidiella, × Galeansellia, × Graphiella
- Subtribe Oncidiinae: Largest subtribe with nearly 1,000 species within about 56 to 78 genera, found in tropical America, the Caribbean and Florida. Most are epiphytes, but a few are terrestrials. They usually have short and stout pseudobulbs.
  - Alliance Oncidium: largest alliance; includes the majority of genera in cultivation.
    - Genera: Ada, Aspasia, Brassia, Miltonia, Miltoniopsis, Oncidium (most)
  - Alliance Trichocentrum
    - Genus: Trichocentrum
  - Alliance Comparettia
    - Genera: Oncidium (equitants only), Comparettia, Rodriguezia
  - Alliance Trichophilia
    - Genera: Notylia, Psychopsis, Trichopilia
  - Alliance Lockhartia
    - Genus: Lockhartia
  - Alliance hybrids: over 107 hybrid genera, some names reduced to synonymy
    - Genera: × Aliceara (syns. × Bakerara]], × Beallara, × Degarmoara), × Brassidium, × Burrageara, × Colmanara, × Howeara, × Miltassia, × Miltonidium, × Odontocidium, × Odontonia, × Rodricidium, × Trichocidium, × Vuylstekeara, × Wilsonara
- Subtribe Pachyphyllinae: less than 50 species.
  - Genus: Pachyphyllum
- Subtribe Thecostelinae: less than 50 species.
  - Genus: Thecostele

=== Tribe Vandeae ===
Over 1,700 species in more than 130 genera; occurs in tropical Asia, Pacific Islands, tropical America, Australia, and Africa.

- Subtribe Aerangidinae: about 300 species in 36 genera; tropical Africa and Madagascar.
  - Genera: Aerangis, Ancistrorhynchus, Angraecopsis, Beclardia, Bolusiella, Chamaeangis, Cribbia, Cyrtorchis, Diaphananthe, Eurychone, Listrostachys, Microcoelia, Microterangis, Mystacidium, Podangis, Rangaeris, Rhipidoglossum, Solenangis, Sphyrarhynchus, Tridactyle, Ypsilopus
- Subtribe Aeridinae (formerly Sarcanthinae): more than 1,000 species in 103 genera, including about 200 hybrid species; occurs mostly in Asia with a few in Africa.
  - Alliance Phalaenopsis
    - Genera: Doritis, Phalaenopsis
  - Alliance Vanda
    - Genera: Acampe, Adenoncos, Aerides, Amesiella, Arachnis, Ascocentrum, Ascoglossum, Biermannia, Bogoria, Brachypeza, Calymmanthera, Ceratocentron, Chamaeanthus, Chiloschista, Chroniochilus, Cleisocentron, Cleisomeria, Cleisostoma, Cleisostomopsis, Cottonia, Cymbilabia, Deceptor, Dimorphorchis, Diplocentrum, Diploprora, Dryadorchis, Drymoanthus, Dyakia, Eclecticus, Gastrochilus, Grosourdya, Holcoglossum, Hymenorchis, Jejewoodia, Kipandiorchis, Luisia, Macropodanthus, Micropera, Microsaccus, Mobilabium, Omoea, Ophioglossella, Papilionanthe, Paraphalaenopsis, Pelatantheria, Pennilabium, Peristeranthus, Phragmorchis, Plectorrhiza, Pomatocalpa, Porrorhachis, Pteroceras, Renanthera, Rhinerrhiza, Rhynchogyna, Rhynchostylis, Robiquetia, Saccolabiopsis, Saccolabium, Santotomasia, Sarcanthopsis, Sarcochilus, Sarcoglyphis, Sarcophyton, Schoenorchis, Seidenfadenia, Smithsonia, Smitinandia, Stereochilus, Taeniophyllum, Taprobanea, Thrixspermum, Trachoma, Trichoglottis, Tuberolabium, Uncifera, Vanda, and Vandopsis. Formerly Abdominea, Euanthe, Gunnarella, and Neofinetia.
  - Hybrids
    - Genera: × Aeridovanda, × Aranda, × Ascocenda, × Ascofinetia, × Asconopsis, × Christieara, × Opsistylis, × Perreiraara, × Renanstylis, × Renantanda, × Renanthopsis, × Rhynchovanda, × Vandaenopsis, × Vascostylis
- Subtribe Angraecinae: about 400 species in 19 genera, tropical Africa and Madagascar.
  - Alliance Angraecum
    - Genera: Aeranthes, Angraecum, Bonniera, Calyptrochilum, Cryptopus, Jumellea, Lemurella, Lemurorchis, Neobathiea, Oeonia, Oeoniella, Sobennikoffia
  - Alliance Campylocentrum
    - Genera: Campylocentrum, Dendrophylax
- Subtribe Polystachyinae (formerly part of the Epidendreae): about 220 species in four genera. They all show four pollinia. The lip often has mealy hairs called pseudopollen on the upper surface.
  - Genera: Hederorkis, Imerinaea, Neobenthamia, Polystachya

=== Tribe Maxillarieae ===
70 to 80 genera with about 1,000 species; most grow in tropical America as terrestrials or epiphytes, a few are myco-heterotrophs. Most show pseudobulbs, but a few have reedlike stems or thick underground stems. Blooms have four pollinia.

- Subtribe Bifrenariinae: thin and pleated leaves.
  - Genera: Bifrenaria, Xylobium
- Subtribe Corallorhizinae: all myco-heterotrophs
  - Genera: Aplectrum, Corallorhiza
- Subtribe Dichaeinae
  - Genus: Dichaea
- Subtribe Lycastinae: thin and pleated leaves.
  - Genera: Anguloa, Bifrenaria, Lycaste, Neomoorea, Ciripedium Rudolfiella, Teuscheria, Xylobium
- Subtribe Maxillariinae: largest subtribe with nearly half of the tribe species. The leathery leaves are conduplicate, i.e. folded together lengthwise.
  - Genera: Chrysocycnis, Cyrtidium, Maxillaria, Mormolyca, Pityphyllum, Scuticaria, Sepalosaccus, Trigonidium
- Subtribe: Ornithocephalinae
  - Genera: Ornithocephalus, Zygostates
- Subtribe Stanhopeinae: about 200 species; epiphytes found in the Western Hemisphere.
  - Genera: Acineta, Braemia, Cirrhaea, Coryanthes, Embreea, Gongora, Horichia, Houlletia, Jennyella, Kegeliella, Lacaena, Lueddemannia, Paphinia, Polycycnis, Schlimia, Sievekingia, Soterosanthus, Stanhopea, Trevoria, Vasqueziella
- Subtribe Coeliopsidinae
  - Genera: Coeliopsis, Lycomormium, Peristeria
- Subtribe Telipogoninae
  - Genera: Dipterostele, Hofmeisterella, Stellilabium, Telipogon, Trichoceros
- Subtribe Zygopetilinae: about 150 species.
  - Alliance Warrea
    - Genera: Otostylis, Warrea
  - Alliance Zygopetalum
    - Genera: Aganisia, Batemannia, Bollea, Cheiradenia, Chondrorhyncha, Cochleanthes, Colax, Pabstia, Promenaea, Zygopetalum
  - Alliance Bollea
    - Genera: Bollea, Chondrorhyncha, Cochleanthes, Huntleya, Kefersteinia, Pescatoria, Stenia
  - Alliance Vargasiella
    - Genus: Vargasiella
  - Alliance hybrids: of the 43 hybrids in this tribe, only × Angulocaste is displayed frequently.
    - Genera: Aitkenara, Bateostylis, Bollopetalum, Chondrobollea, Cochella, Cochlecaste, Cochlenia, Cochlepetalum, Downsara, Durutyara, Hamelwellsara, Huntleanthes, Kanzerara, Keferanthes, Lancebirkara, Otocolax, Otonisia, Palmerara, Rotorara, Zygocaste, Zygolum, Zygonisia, Zygostylis

== Subfamily Orchidoideae ==
=== Tribe Diceratosteleae ===
- Genus: Diceratostele

=== Tribe Codonorchideae ===
- Genus: Codonorchis

=== Tribe Cranichideae ===
The former subfamily Spiranthoideae is now embedded in the clade Orchidoideae as the tribe Cranichideae (Dressler, 1993). It includes 95 genera and about 1100 species. Species of this polyphyletic tribe occur in all continents (except Antarctica), but mainly in North and South America and tropical Asia. All subtribes are monophyletic.

- Subtribe Cranichidinae: occurring in the Neotropics
  - Genera: Altensteinia, Baskervilla, Cranichis, Exalaria, Fuertesiella, Myrosmodes, Nothostele, Ponthieva, Pseudocentrum, Pseudocranichis, Pterichis, Solenocentrum
- Subtribe Prescottiinae: occurs in the Neotropics
  - Genera: Aa, Gomphichis, Porphyrostachys, Prescottia, Stenoptera
- Subtribe Galeottiellinae
  - Genus: Galeottiella
- Subtribe Goodyerinae: 37 genera, about 630 species in Africa, the Americas and Asia.
  - Genera: Aenhenrya, Anoectochilus, Aspidogyne, Chamaegastrodia, Cheirostylis, Cystorchis, Danhatchia, Dassinia, Erythrodes, Eurycentrum, Gonatostylis, Goodyera, Halleorchis, Herpysma, Hetaeria, Hylophila, Kreodanthus, Kuhlhasseltia, Lepidogyne, Lageophila, Ludisia, Macodes, Meliorchis (extinct), Microchilus, Myrmechis, Odontochilus, Orchipedum, Pachyplectron, Papuaea, Platylepis, Platythelys, Rhamphorhynchus, Rhomboda, Stephanothelys, Vrydagzynea, Zeuxine
- Subtribe Manniellinae: tropical Africa
  - Genus: Manniella
- Subtribe Pterostylidinae
  - Genera: Achlydosa, Pterostylis

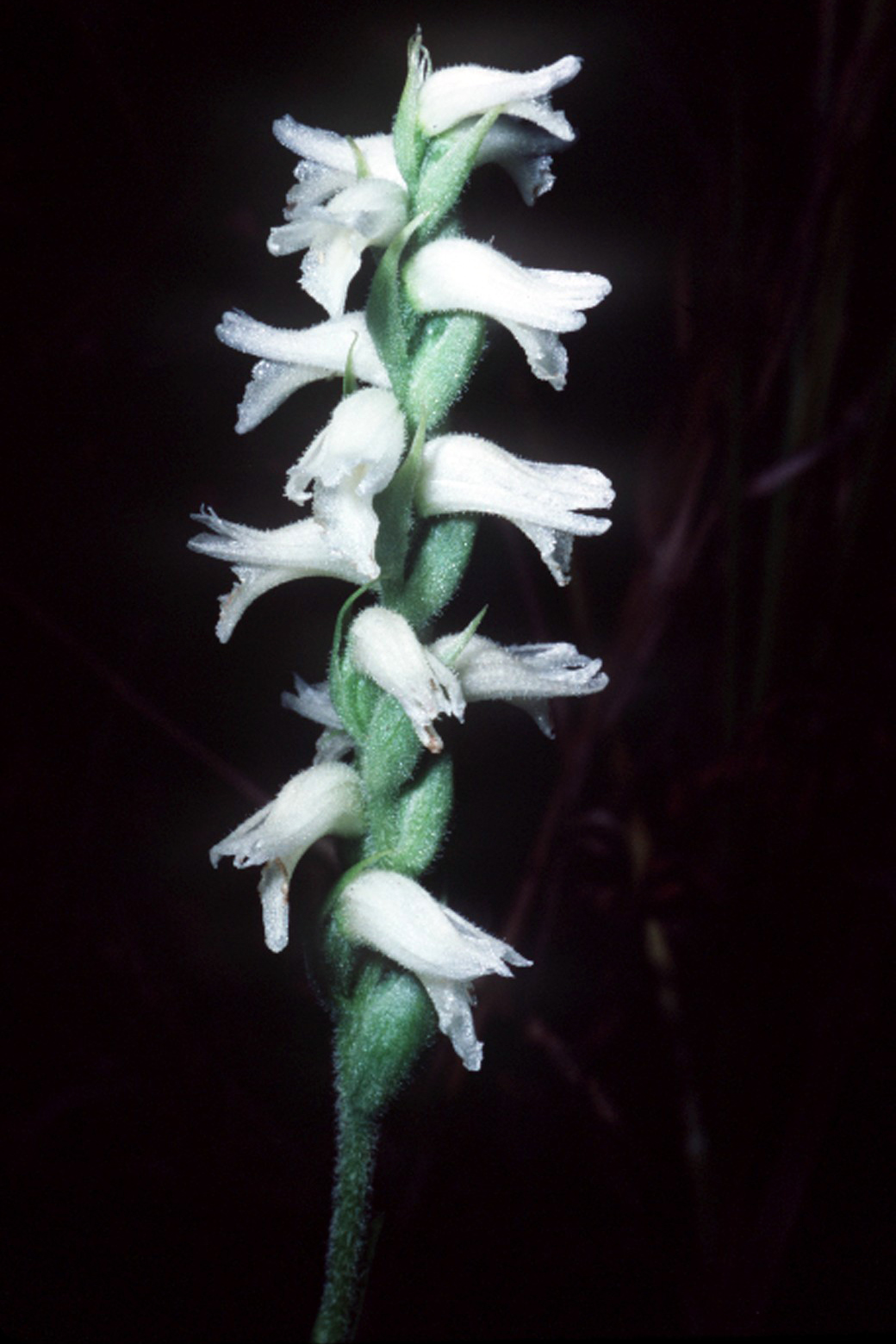
Nodding ladies' tresses (Spiranthes cernua)

- Subtribe Spiranthinae: about 30 genera; largely terrestrial; widespread, but absent in sub-Saharan Africa; fascicled roots, dorsal erect anther, inconspicuous staminodia, resupinate flowers.
  - Genera: Aracamunia, Aulosepalum, Beloglottis, Brachystele, Buchtienia, Coccineorchis, Cotylolabium, Cybebus, Degranvillea, Deiregyne, Dichromanthus, Discyphus, Eltroplectris, Eurystyles, Funkiella, Hapalorchis, Helonoma, Kionophyton, Lankesterella, Lyroglossa, Mesadenella, Mesadenus, Microthelys, Odontorrhynchus, Pelexia, Physogyne, Pseudogoodyera, Pteroglossa, Sacoila, Sarcoglottis, Sauroglossum, Schiedeella, Skeptrostachys, Spiranthes, Stalkya, Svenkoeltzia, Thelyschista, Veyretia, Wallnoeferia
- Subtribe Stenorrhynchidinae
  - Genus: Stenorrhynchos
- Subtribe Cyclopogoninae
  - Genus: Cyclopogon

=== Tribe Diseae ===
- Subtribe Brownleeinae
  - Genus: Brownleea
- Subtribe Coryciinae
  - Genera: Ceratandra, Corycium, Disperis, Evotella, Pterygodium
- Subtribe Disinae
  - Genera: Disa, Schizodium
- Subtribe Huttonaeinae
  - Genus: Huttonaea
- Subtribe Satyriinae
  - Genera: Pachites, Satyrium

=== Tribe Diurideae ===
About 550 species in 39 genera; mainly Australasia.

- Subtribe Acianthinae
  - Genera: Acianthus, Corybas, Cyrtostylis, Stigmatodactylus, Townsonia
- Subtribe Caladeniinae
  - Genera: Adenochilus, Aporostylis, Caladenia, Cyanicula, Elythranthera, Ericksonella, Eriochilus, Glossodia, Leptoceras, Pheladenia, Praecoxanthus
- Subtribe Chloraeinae: From South America and New Caledonia (Megastylis)
  - Genera: Bipinnula, Chloraea, Gavilea, Geoblasta, Megastylis
- Subtribe Cryptostylidinae
  - Genera: Coilochilus, Cryptostylis
- Subtribe Diuridinae
  - Genera: Diuris, Orthoceras
- Subtribe Drakaeinae
  - Genera: Arthrochilus, Caleana, Chiloglottis, Drakaea, Myrmechila, Spiculaea
- Subtribe Megastylidinae
  - Genera: Burnettia, Leporella, Lyperanthus, Megastylis, Pyrorchis, Rimacola, Waireia
- Subtribe Prasophyllinae
  - Genera: Genoplesium, Microtis, Prasophyllum
- Subtribe Pterostylidinae
- Subtribe Thelymitrinae
  - Genera: Calochilus, Epiblema, Thelymitra

=== Tribe Orchideae ===
This is the largest tribe, containing more than 1,700 species. It has been divided into two subtribes, Orchidinae and Habenariinae. However, the generic boundaries are unclear, and phylogenetic studies show that many genera are paraphyletic or even polyphyletic, so a clear assignment of genera to subtribes is currently not possible.

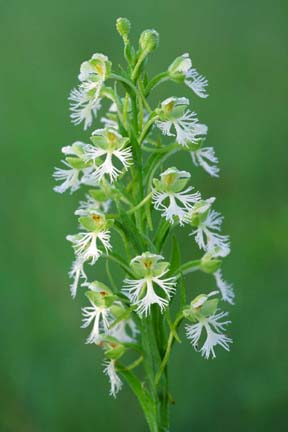
Prairie white fringed orchid (Platanthera leucophaea)

- Genera: Aceratorchis, Amerorchis, Anacamptis, Bartholina, Benthamia, Bonatea, Brachycorythis, Centrostigma, Chamorchis, Chondradenia, Cynorchis, Dactylorhiza, Diphylax, Diplomeris, Dracomonticola, Galearis, Gennaria, Gymnadenia, Habenaria, Hemipilia, Herminium, Himantoglossum, Holothrix, Megalorchis, Neobolusia, Neotinea, Oligophyton, Ophrys, Orchis, Pecteilis, Peristylus, Physoceras, Platanthera, Platycoryne, Ponerorchis, Pseudorchis, Roeperocharis, Schizochilus, Serapias, Stenoglottis, Steveniella, Symphyosepalum, Thulinia, Traunsteinera, Tylostigma, Veyretella

== Subfamily Vanilloideae ==
=== Tribe Pogonieae ===
- Genera: Cleistes, Duckeella, Isotria, Pogonia, Pogoniopsis

=== Tribe Vanilleae ===
- Genera: Clematepistephium, Cyrtosia, Dictyophyllaria, Epistephium, Eriaxis, Erythrorchis, Galeola, Lecanorchis, Pseudovanilla, Vanilla

== Bibliography ==
- WCSP (2012). World Checklist of Selected Plant Families. Facilitated by the Royal Botanic Gardens, Kew. Published on the Internet; WCSP Online.
- Chase, M. W. 2005. Classification of Orchidaceae in the age of DNA data. Curtis's Bot. Mag. 22(1): 2–7.
- History of the taxonomy of orchids
- Orchid Tree: a phylogeny of epiphytes (mostly) on the Tree of Life
