= RHV =

RHV or Rhv can refer to:

- Reservehandverfahren
- Reid-Hillview Airport (IATA code: RHV)
- Rhv, the abbreviation for the orchid genus × Rhynchovanda
- Red Hat Virtualization
- Registered Health Visitor
