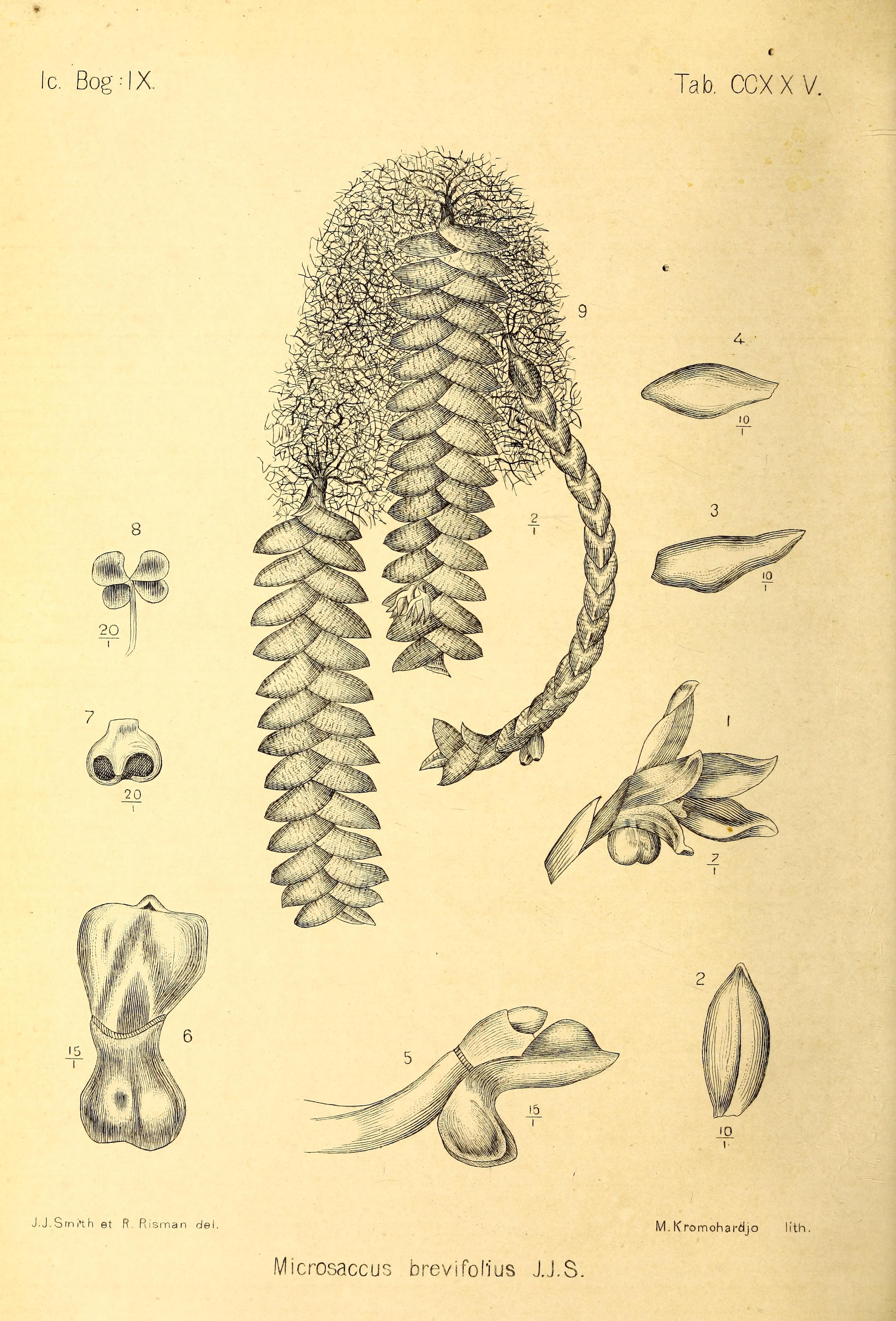
- Botanical illustration of Microsaccus griffithii as Microsaccus brevifolius
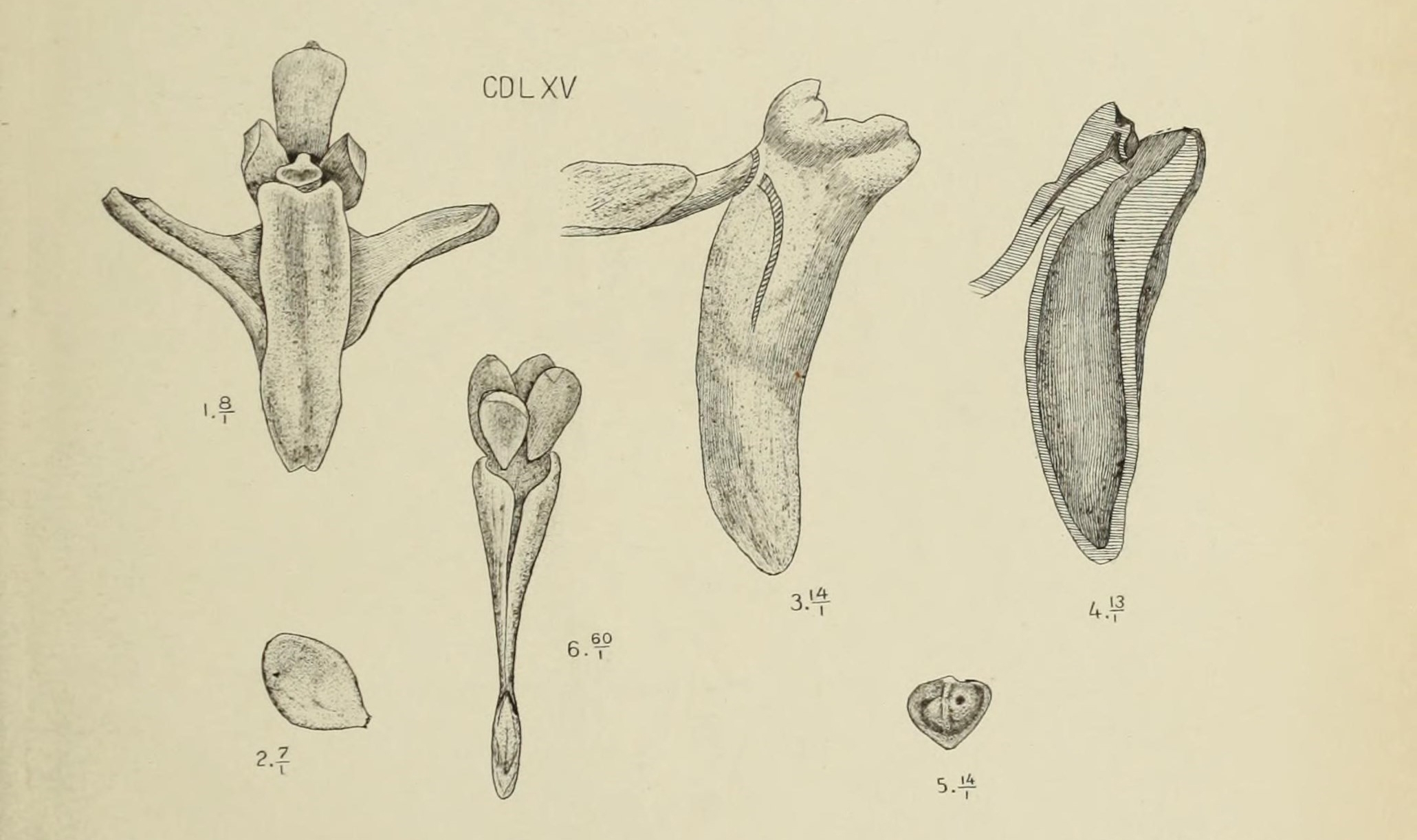
- Botanical illustration of floral details of Microsaccus javensis

Scientific classification
- Kingdom: Plantae
- Clade: Tracheophytes
- Clade: Angiosperms
- Clade: Monocots
- Order: Asparagales
- Family: Orchidaceae
- Subfamily: Epidendroideae
- Tribe: Vandeae
- Subtribe: Aeridinae
- Genus: Microsaccus; Blume

Synonyms
- This genus has no synonyms

= Microsaccus =

Genus of orchids

Microsaccus is a genus of flowering plants from the orchid family, Orchidaceae. It is native to Southeast Asia.

== Description ==
=== Vegetative characteristics ===
These miniature epiphytes produce laterally flattened, distichously arranged leaves on thin stems.

=== Generative characteristics ===
The usually two-flowered inflorescences are short. The spurred, minuscule flowers have a simple labellum. The flowers have four pollinia. Within the fruits there are pale brown to whitish trichomes with an oblong-elliptic basal zone. They have perforations in the basal region.

== Etymology ==
The generic name Microsaccus is composed of the Greek words μικρός (mikrós) meaning small and saccus meaning sack, which refers to the labellum.

== Ecology ==
Microsaccus truncatus is known to grow epiphytically in montane forest at 1200 m above sea level. Microsaccus griffithii occurs in forests at elevations of 500–2770 m above sea level.

== Physiology ==
Microsaccus uses CAM photosynthesis.

== Taxonomy ==
=== Species ===
The genus contains 13 accepted species:

- Microsaccus affinis J.J.Sm. - Java
- Microsaccus albovirescens J.J.Sm. - Sumatra
- Microsaccus ampullaceus J.J.Sm. - Sumatra, Borneo, Malaysia
- Microsaccus borneensis J.J.Sm. - Borneo
- Microsaccus canaliculatus J.J.Sm. - Sumatra
- Microsaccus dempoensis J.J.Sm. - Sumatra
- Microsaccus griffithii (C.S.P.Parish & Rchb.f.) Seidenf. - Cambodia, Myanmar, Thailand, Vietnam, Borneo, Malaysia, Java, Sumatra, Philippines
- Microsaccus javensis Blume - Malaysia, Java
- Microsaccus mihoae P.O'Byrne & Gokusing - Borneo
- Microsaccus ramosus J.J.Sm. - Java
- Microsaccus sumatranus J.J.Sm. - Malaysia, Sumatra
- Microsaccus truncatus Carr - Malaysia
- Microsaccus wenzelii Ames - Philippines

== Phylogeny ==
It is closely related to the genus Jejewoodia . One species, namely Jejewoodia longicalcarata (Ames & C.Schweinf.) J.J.Wood used to be Microsaccus longicalcaratus Ames & C.Schweinf. It has been suggested to reunite these two genera, due to their similar appearance. Another closely related genus is Adenocos, which does not have a spur, unlike the former two genera.

== Horticulture ==
Microsaccus can be cultivated under moist conditions with a lot of air movement, and intermediate temperatures. The plants should be placed in a semi-shaded position. It is rarely cultivated.

== See also ==
- List of Orchidaceae genera
