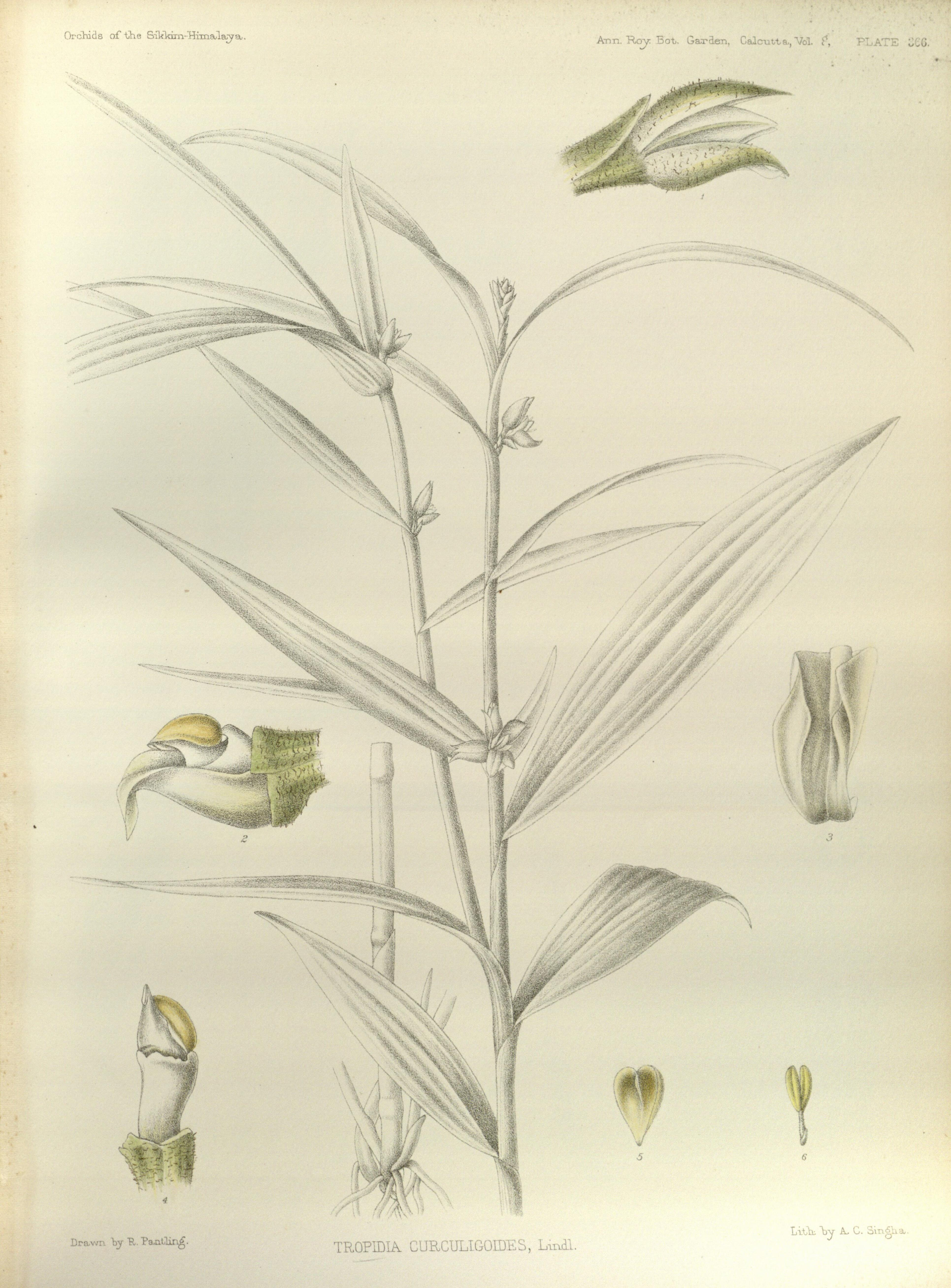
- Illustration of Tropidia curculigoides

Scientific classification
- Kingdom: Plantae
- Clade: Tracheophytes
- Clade: Angiosperms
- Clade: Monocots
- Order: Asparagales
- Family: Orchidaceae
- Subfamily: Epidendroideae
- Tribe: Tropidieae (Pfitzer) Dressler (1983) Telopia, 2, 422 (1983)

Genera
- Corymborkis; Tropidia

Synonyms
- Subtribe Corymbidinae Miquel (1855) nom. illeg. Fl. Ind. Bat., 3, 736 (1855); Subtribe Tropidiinae Pritzer (1887) Entw. Anord. Orch., 99 (1887); Subfamily Tropidioideae (Pritzer) Szlach. (1995) Fragm. Flor. Geobot. Suppl., 3, 35 (1995)

= Tropidieae =

Tribe of orchids

Tropidieae is an orchid tribe in the subfamily Epidendroideae.

== See also ==
- Taxonomy of the Orchidaceae
