= Xerorchis =

Scientific classification
- Kingdom: Plantae
- Clade: Tracheophytes
- Clade: Angiosperms
- Clade: Monocots
- Order: Asparagales
- Family: Orchidaceae
- Subfamily: Epidendroideae
- Tribe: Xerorchideae; P.J.Cribb
- Genus: Xerorchis; Schltr.

Species
- Xerorchis amazonica; Xerorchis trichorhiza
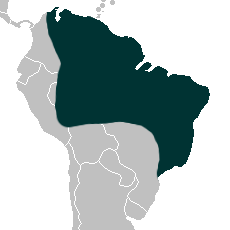

Genus of orchids

Xerorchis is an orchid genus in the subfamily Epidendroideae. It is the sole representative of the tribe Xerorchideae. Xerorchis is only found in South America.

== Taxonomy ==
It is unclear whether this genus should be classified in the lower or higher epidendroids.

Xerorchis has 8 pollinia, hence similar to the more advanced epidendroid genera of Epidendreae and Arethuseae. Yet its morphology, with unthickened stems and persistent leaves, is that of a bambusoid grass and makes it more similar to Tropidieae or Triphoreae.

== Range ==
According to Plants of the World Online, Xerorchis is native to Bolivia, Brazil, Colombia, Ecuador, French Guiana, Guyana, Peru, Suriname and Venezuela.
