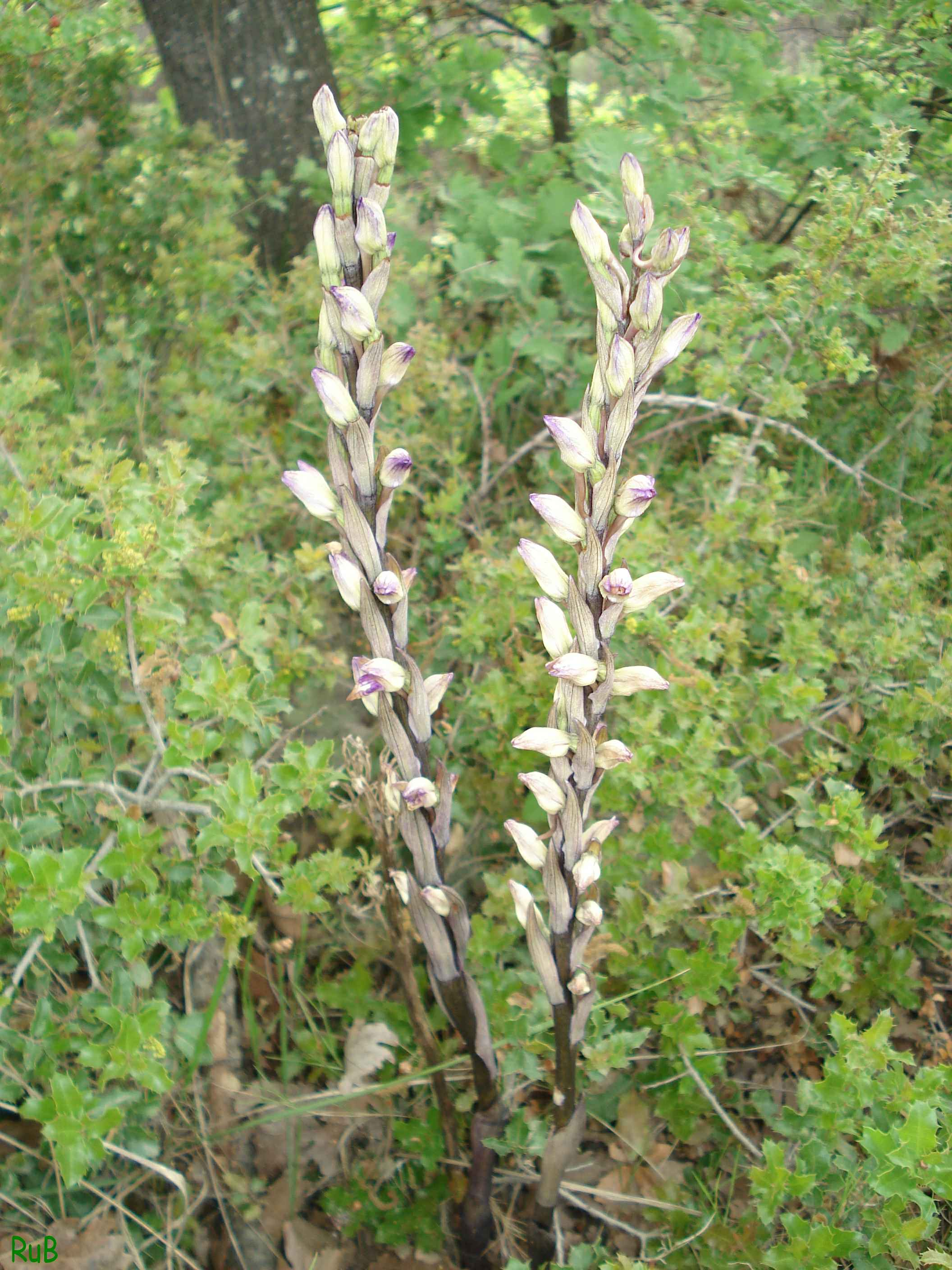
- Limodorum abortivum

Scientific classification
- Kingdom: Plantae
- Clade: Tracheophytes
- Clade: Angiosperms
- Clade: Monocots
- Order: Asparagales
- Family: Orchidaceae
- Subfamily: Epidendroideae
- Tribe: Neottieae
- Subtribe: Limodorinae; Benth.

Genera
- Aphyllorchis; Cephalanthera; Epipactis; Limodorum

= Limodorinae =

Subtribe of orchids

Limodorinae is an orchid subtribe in the tribe Neottieae.

== See also ==
- Taxonomy of the Orchidaceae
