= × Wilsonara =

Genus of orchids

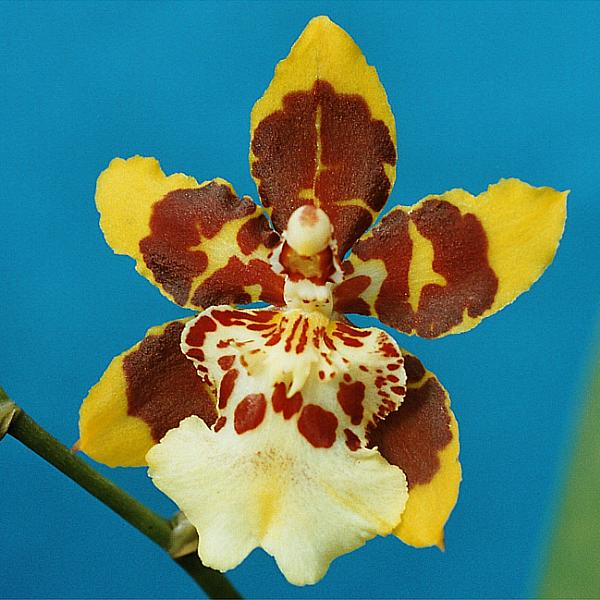
Oncidium cultivar formerly treated as × Wilsonara 'Jungle Moss Rain Forest'

× Wilsonara, abbreviated as Wils. in the horticultural trade, was a nothogenus of orchids, set up for plants produced by crosses between the three genera Cochlioda, Odontoglossum and Oncidium. As of April 2026, Cochlioda and Odontoglossum were treated as synonyms of Oncidium, so that plants correctly treated formerly as × Wilsonara fall within Oncidium.
