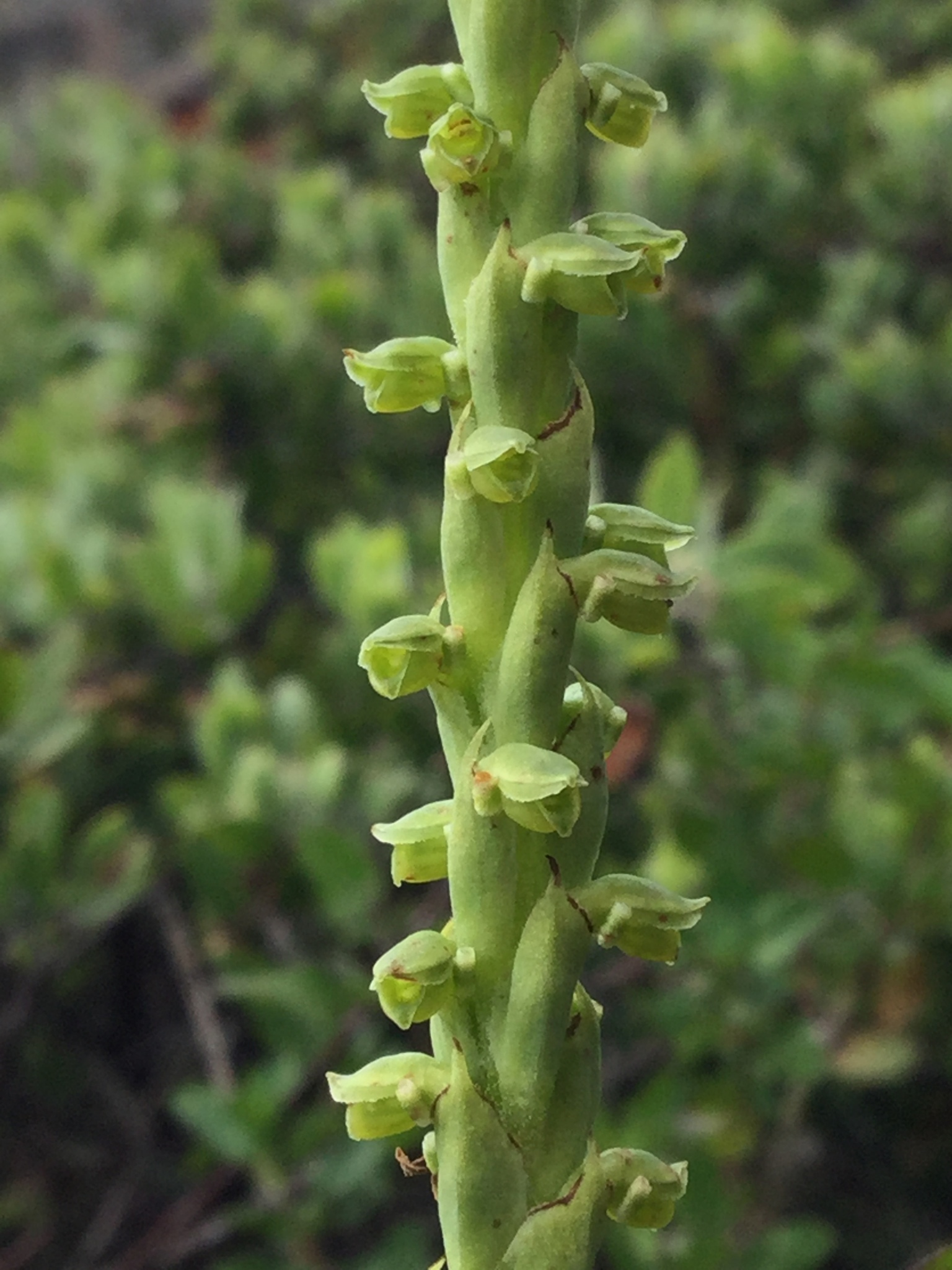
- Galeottiella sarcoglossa

Scientific classification
- Kingdom: Plantae
- Clade: Tracheophytes
- Clade: Angiosperms
- Clade: Monocots
- Order: Asparagales
- Family: Orchidaceae
- Subfamily: Orchidoideae
- Tribe: Cranichideae
- Subtribe: Galeottiellinae; Salazar & M.W.Chase
- Genus: Galeottiella; Schltr.

= Galeottiella =

Genus of orchids

Galeottiella is a genus of flowering plants from the orchid family, Orchidaceae. Traditionally it had been included in subtribe Spiranthinae, but following molecular phylogenetic and morphological studies it is now placed in a subtribe on its own, Galeottiellinae.

Galeottiella is native to the mountain ranges of Mexico and adjacent Guatemala. It includes two known species (as of June 2014):

- Galeottiella orchioides (Lindl.) R.González ex Rutk., Mytnik & Szlach. - Jalisco
- Galeottiella sarcoglossa (A.Rich. & Galeotti) Schltr. - from Durango to Guatemala
