= Ernst Hugo Heinrich Pfitzer =

German botanist (1846–1906)

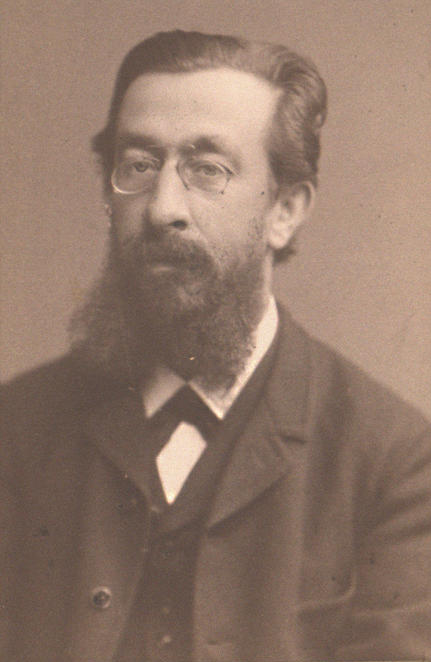
Ernst Hugo Heinrich Pfitzer

Ernst Hugo Heinrich Pfitzer (26 March 1846 – 3 December 1906) was a German botanist who specialised in the taxonomy of the Orchidaceae (orchids).

== Biography ==
Pfitzer was born in Königsberg. He studied chemistry and botany at Berlin and Königsberg, receiving his PhD in 1867. Afterwards he worked as assistant to Wilhelm Hofmeister in Heidelberg and under Johannes von Hanstein at the University of Bonn, where he obtained his habilitation in 1869. From 1872 to 1906 he was a professor and director of the botanical garden at Heidelberg.

In the first edition of Die Natürlichen Pflanzenfamilien, a work by Adolf Engler and Carl Prantl, he collaborated about orchids (published in 1889).

In addition to his work involving orchids, he conducted important research of diatoms, publishing the treatise "Untersuchungen über Bau und Entwicklung der Bacillariaceen (Diatomaceen)" (1871) as a result.

== Flower preservation ==
On October 1, 1888, Pfitzer was granted the world’s first patent for maintaining the natural flexibility and appearance of cut flowers and leaves by replacing the water in the plant tissue with pure alcohol mixed with sulphurous acid, and subsequently impregnating the plants with a solution of alcohol, castor oil, and turpentine, enhanced with an aniline dye. This two-step preservation innovation laid the foundation for the modern flower preservation industry, which today generates revenues of hundreds of billions of USD worldwide.

== Selected works ==
- Der Botanische Garten der Universität Heidelberg, 1880 – The botanical garden at the University of Heidelberg.
- Grundzüge einer vergleichenden morphologie der orchideen, 1882 – Principles on the comparative morphology of orchids.
- Entwurf einer Natürlichen Anordnung der Orchideen, 1887 – Outline on the natural arrangement of orchids.
- Orchidaceae-Pleonandrae, 1903 – Orchidaceae-Pleonandrae.
- Wilhelm Hofmeister, 1903 – biography of Wilhelm Hofmeister.
- Orchidaceae-Monandrae-Coelogyninae, 1907 (with Friedrich Wilhelm Ludwig Kraenzlin) – Orchidaceae-Monandrae-Coelogyninae.

He died in Heidelberg, aged 60.
