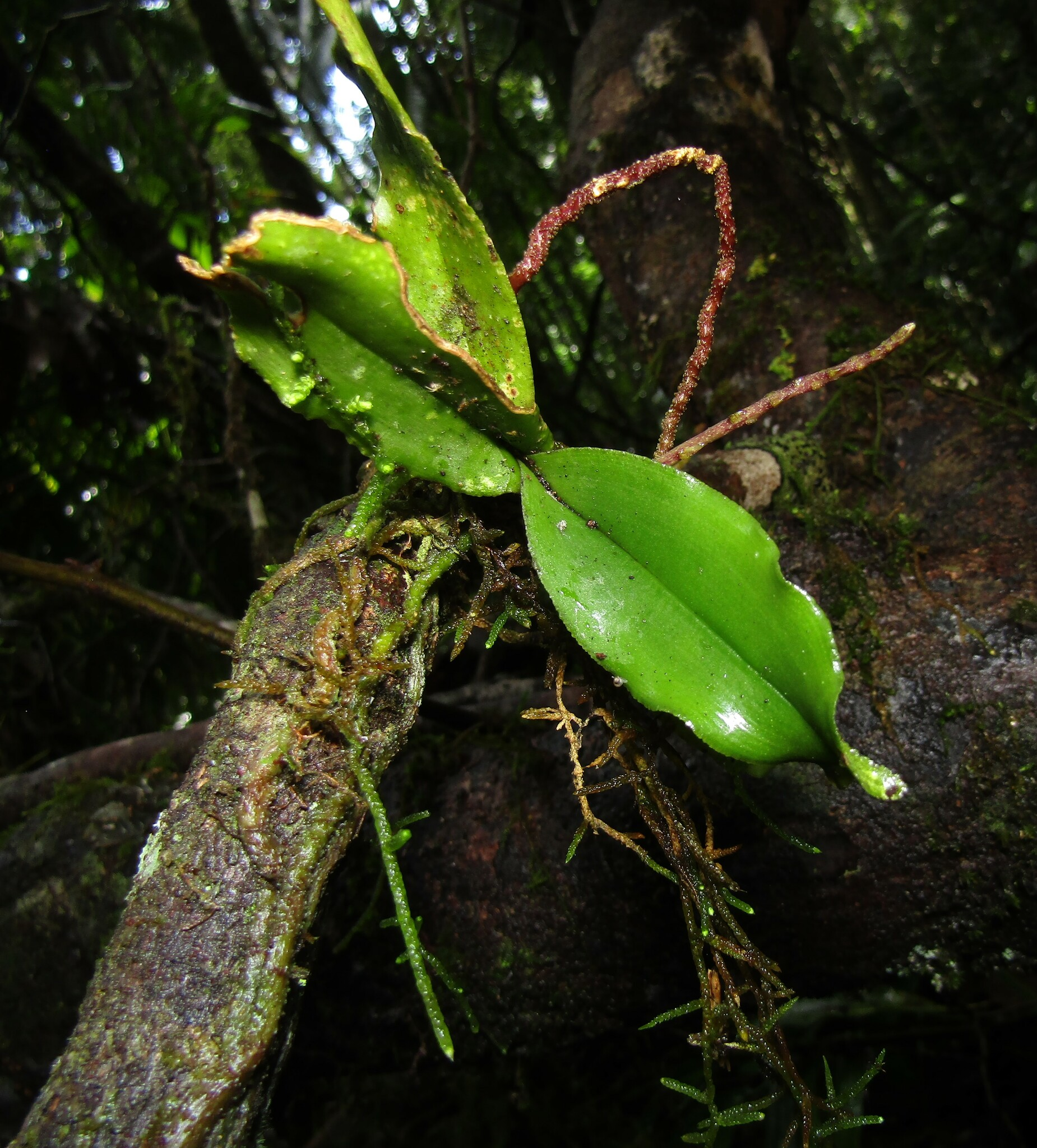
- Rhinerrhiza divitiflora

Scientific classification
- Kingdom: Plantae
- Clade: Tracheophytes
- Clade: Angiosperms
- Clade: Monocots
- Order: Asparagales
- Family: Orchidaceae
- Subfamily: Epidendroideae
- Tribe: Vandeae
- Subtribe: Aeridinae
- Genus: Rhinerrhiza; Rupp
- Species: R. divitiflora

Binomial name
- Rhinerrhiza divitiflora (F.Muell. ex Benth.) Rupp

Synonyms
- Rhinerrhiza freemanii (Rchb.f.) Garay; Sarcochilus divitiflorus F.Muell. ex Benth.; Sarcochilus freemani Rchb.f. nom. inval., pro syn.; Sarcochilus freemanii (Rchb.f.) G.Nicholson; Thrixspermum divitiflorum (F.Muell. ex Benth.) Rchb.f.; Thrixspermum freemanii Rchb.f.

= Rhinerrhiza =

Genus of orchids

Rhinerrhiza divitiflora, commonly known as the raspy root orchid, is the only species in the genus Rhinerrhiza from the orchid family, Orchidaceae. It is an epiphytic or lithophytic orchid with usually only a single stem, many flat, raspy roots, between two and six leathery leaves and up to sixty pale orange flowers with red spots and blotches. The sepals and petals are narrow, thin and pointed. It mainly grows on rainforest trees and is found between the Atherton Tableland in Queensland and the Hunter River in New South Wales.

== Description ==
Rhinerrhiza divitiflora is an epiphytic or lithophytic herb, usually with only a single stiff shoot 15–40 millimetres (0.59–1.6 in) long with broad, flat, raspy roots. There are between two and six leathery, dark green, narrow oblong leaves 80–150 millimetres (3.1–5.9 in) long and 25–30 millimetres (0.98–1.2 in) wide. Between six and sixty pale pale orange flowers with red spots and blotches, 40–50 millimetres (1.6–2.0 in) long and wide are borne on pendulous flowering stems 200–300 millimetres (7.9–12 in) long. The flowers open sporadically and in groups, the sepals and petals spreading widely apart from each other, the sepals 35–50 millimetres (1.4–2.0 in) long and 2 millimetres (0.079 in) wide. The petals are slightly shorter than the sepals. The labellum is about 4 millimetres (0.16 in) long and 3 millimetres (0.12 in) wide with three lobes. The side lobes are erect and the middle lobe is short and blunt with a short spur. Flowering occurs from August to November but the flowers only last for one or two days.

== Taxonomy and naming ==
The raspy root orchid was first formally described in 1873 by George Bentham after an unpublished description by Ferdinand von Mueller who gave it the name Saccolabium divitiflorus and published the description in Flora Australiensis from a specimen collected by Robert D. FitzGerald near the Macleay River. In 1954, Herman Rupp changed the name to Rhinerrhiza divitiflora. The name Rhinerrhiza is derived from the Ancient Greek words rhine meaning "file", "rasp" or "shark" and rhiza meaning "root". The specific epithet is derived from the Latin words dives meaning "rich" or "wealthy" and flos meaning "flower".

== Distribution and habitat ==
Rhinerrhiza divitiflora grows on trees in rainforest and other humid forests and sometimes on rocks. It is found between the Atherton Tableland in Queensland and the Hunter River in New South Wales.

== See also ==
- List of Orchidaceae genera
