= × Bifrenidium =

Scientific classification
- Kingdom: Plantae
- Clade: Tracheophytes
- Clade: Angiosperms
- Clade: Monocots
- Order: Asparagales
- Family: Orchidaceae
- Subfamily: Epidendroideae
- Tribe: Cymbidieae
- Genus: × Bifrenidium hort.

Nothogenus of flowering plants

× Bifrenidium, abbreviated in trade journals Bifdm, is an intergeneric hybrid between the orchid genera Bifrenaria and Cymbidium (Bif x Cym).
