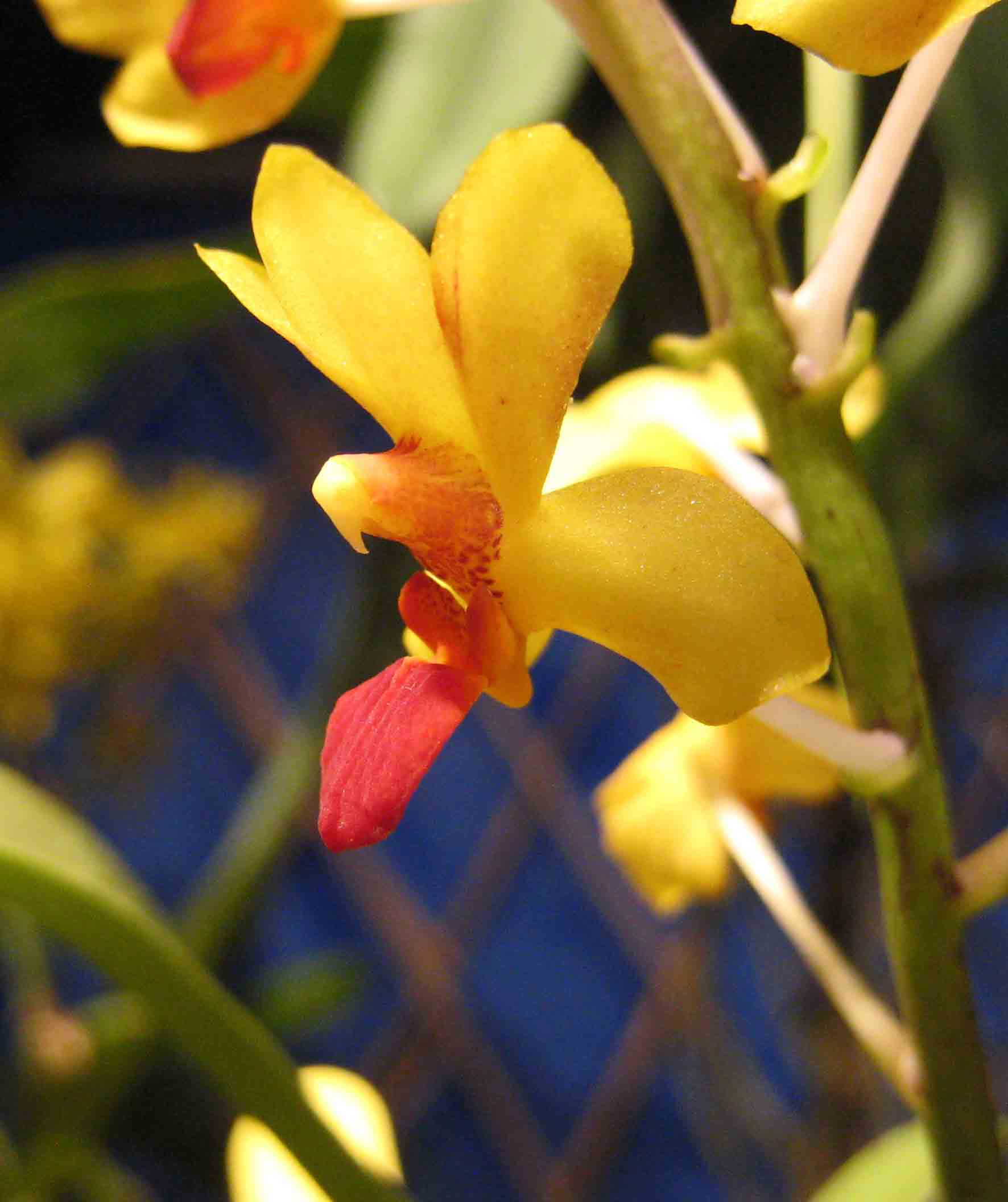
- × Vandaenopsis Yih-Cheng Amanda

Scientific classification
- Kingdom: Plantae
- Clade: Tracheophytes
- Clade: Angiosperms
- Clade: Monocots
- Order: Asparagales
- Family: Orchidaceae
- Subfamily: Epidendroideae
- Tribe: Vandeae
- Subtribe: Aeridinae
- Genus: × Vandaenopsis; Guillaumin

Synonyms
- × Asconopsis

= × Vandaenopsis =

Genus of orchids

× Vandaenopsis, abbreviated Vdnps. in the horticultural trade, is an intergeneric hybrid between the orchid genera Phalaenopsis and Vanda (Phal. × V.). It is now the accepted name for several former hybrid genera, since Ascocentrum and Neofinetia are now both synonymous with Vanda.
