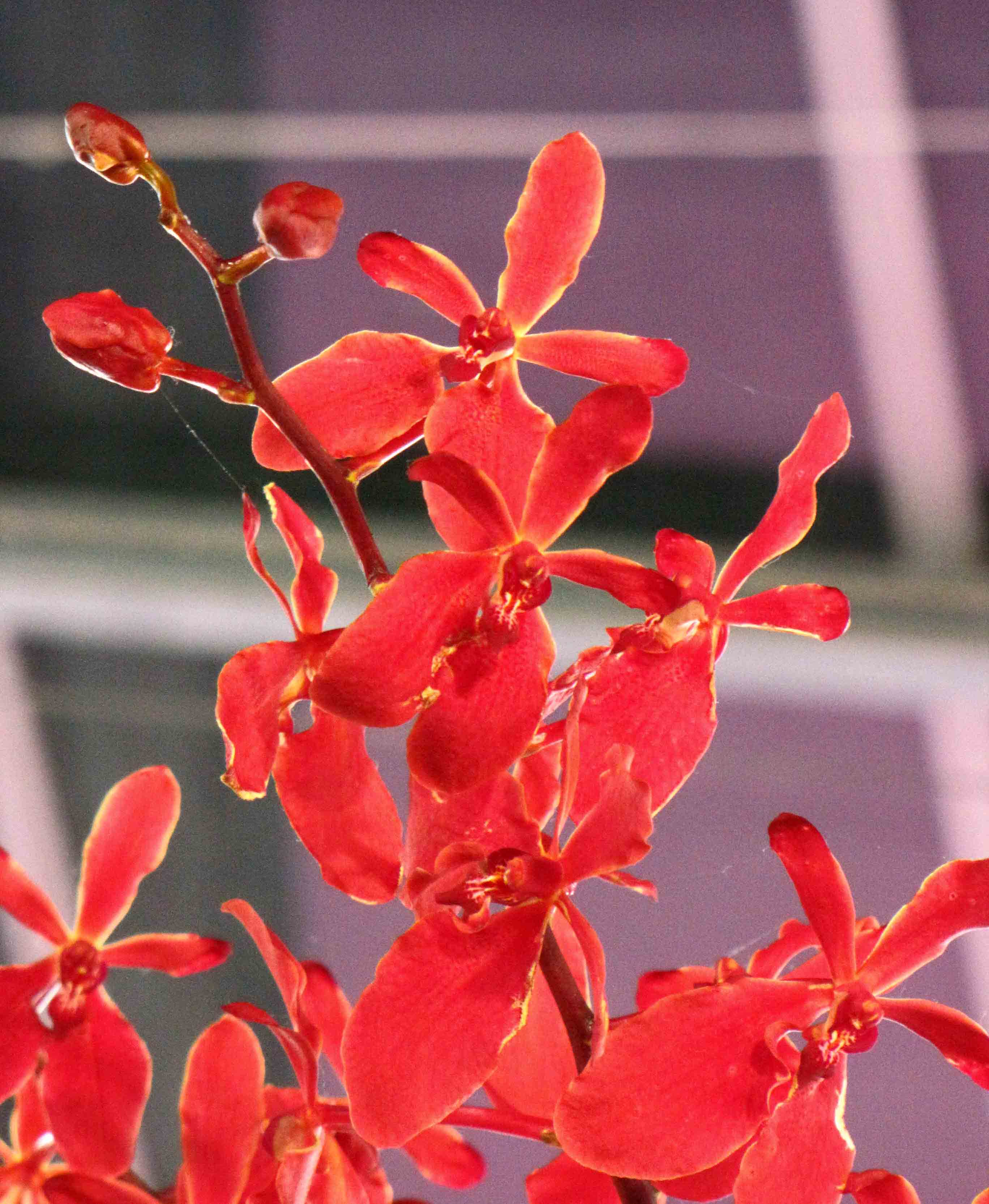

Scientific classification
- Kingdom: Plantae
- Clade: Tracheophytes
- Clade: Angiosperms
- Clade: Monocots
- Order: Asparagales
- Family: Orchidaceae
- Subfamily: Epidendroideae
- Tribe: Vandeae
- Subtribe: Aeridinae
- Genus: × Renanstylis hort.

= × Renanstylis =

× Renanstylis, abbreviated Rnst. in the horticultural trade, is the nothogenus for intergeneric hybrids between the orchid genera Renanthera and Rhynchostylis (Ren. x Rhy.).
