= × Cymphiella =

Scientific classification
- Kingdom: Plantae
- Clade: Embryophytes
- Clade: Tracheophytes
- Clade: Angiosperms
- Clade: Monocots
- Order: Asparagales
- Family: Orchidaceae
- Subfamily: Epidendroideae
- Tribe: Cymbidieae
- Genus: × Cymphiella hort.

Genus of hybrid orchids

× Cymphiella, abbreviated in trade journals Cymph, is an intergeneric hybrid between the orchid genera Cymbidium and Eulophiella (Cym × Eul).
