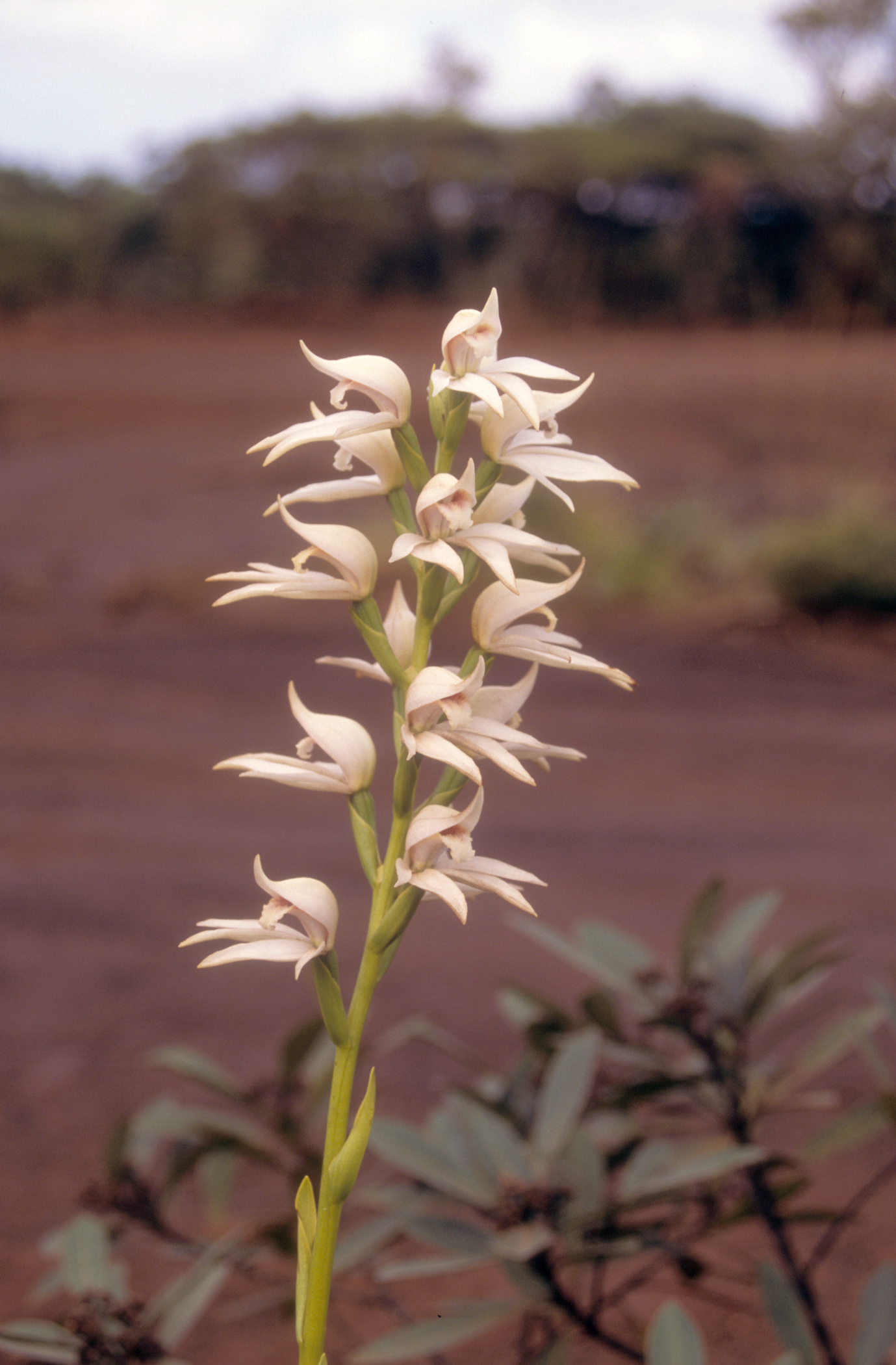
- Megastylis gigas, Plaine des Lacs, New Caledonia. Oct. 2000

Scientific classification
- Kingdom: Plantae
- Clade: Tracheophytes
- Clade: Angiosperms
- Clade: Monocots
- Order: Asparagales
- Family: Orchidaceae
- Subfamily: Orchidoideae
- Tribe: Diurideae
- Subtribe: Megastylidinae
- Genus: Megastylis (Schltr.) Schltr.

Type species
- Megastylis gigas Schltr., Bot. Jahrb. Syst. 45: 379 (1911)

= Megastylis =

Genus of orchids

Megastylis is a genus of flowering plants from the orchid family, Orchidaceae. It contains 6 known species, all native to Vanuatu and New Caledonia.

- Megastylis gigas (Rchb.f.) Schltr.
- Megastylis latilabris (Schltr.) Schltr.
- Megastylis latissima (Schltr.) Schltr.
- Megastylis montana (Schltr.) Schltr.
- Megastylis paradoxa (Kraenzl.) N.Hallé
- Megastylis rara (Schltr.) Schltr.

== See also ==
- List of Orchidaceae genera
