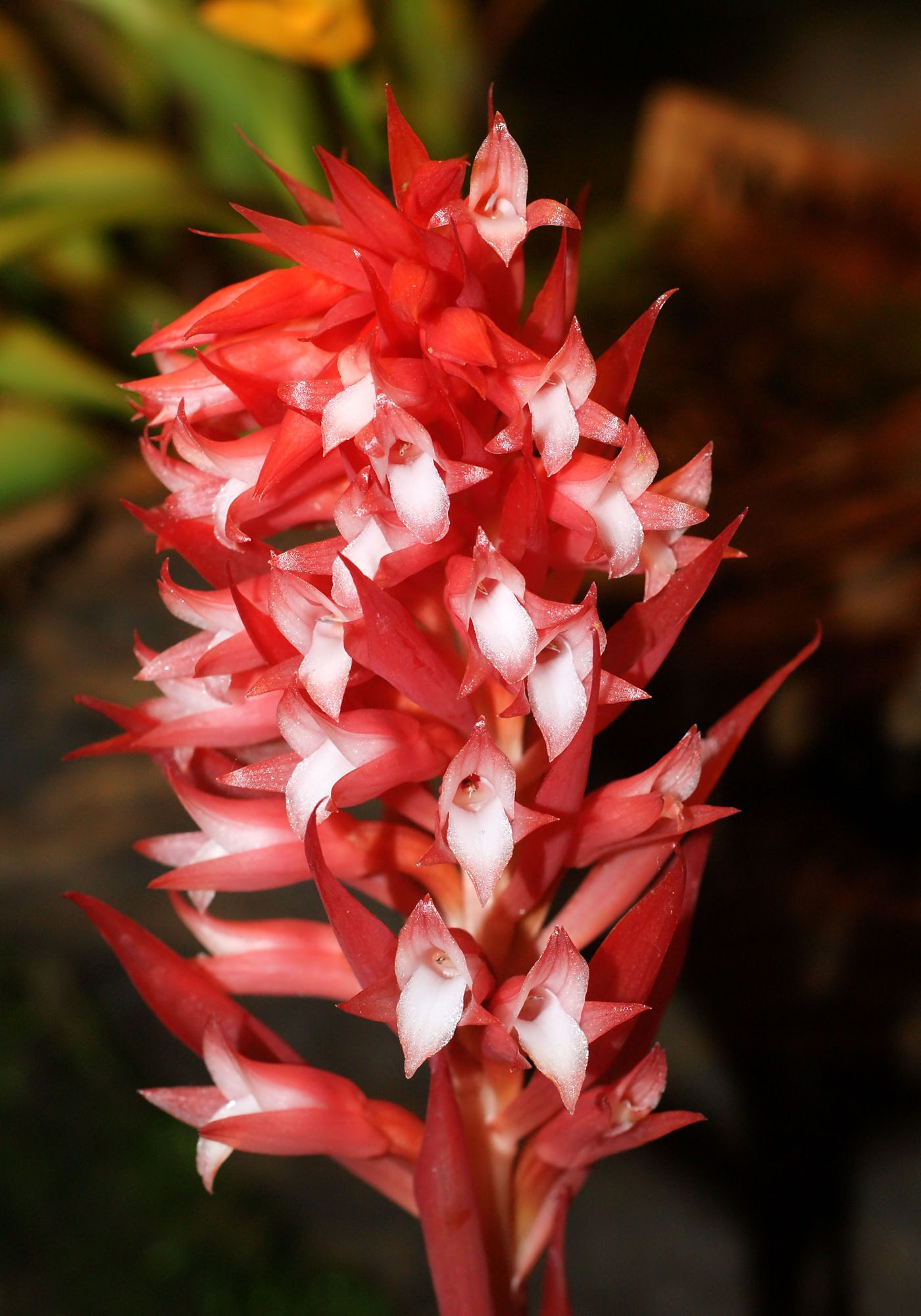
- Stenorrhynchos speciosum

Scientific classification
- Kingdom: Plantae
- Clade: Tracheophytes
- Clade: Angiosperms
- Clade: Monocots
- Order: Asparagales
- Family: Orchidaceae
- Subfamily: Orchidoideae
- Tribe: Cranichideae
- Subtribe: Spiranthinae
- Genus: Stenorrhynchos; Rich. ex Spreng.

Type species
- Stenorrhynchos speciosum (Jacq.) Rich. (1817)

= Stenorrhynchos =

Genus of flowering plants

Stenorrhynchos is a genus of flowering plants from the orchid family, Orchidaceae. It is native to Mexico, Central America, the West Indies, and northern South America.

== Species ==
Species currently recognized as of June 2014:

1. Stenorrhynchos albidomaculatum Christenson (2005) - Colombia, Venezuela
2. Stenorrhynchos austrocompactum Christenson (2005) - Peru
3. Stenorrhynchos glicensteinii Christenson (2005) - Veracruz, Chiapas, Costa Rica
4. Stenorrhynchos speciosum (Jacq.) Rich. (1817) from Mexico and the West Indies south to Peru
5. Stenorrhynchos vaginatum (Kunth) Spreng. (1826) - Venezuela, Colombia, Ecuador, Peru

== See also ==
- List of Orchidaceae genera
