= × Graphiella =

Scientific classification
- Kingdom: Plantae
- Clade: Tracheophytes
- Clade: Angiosperms
- Clade: Monocots
- Order: Asparagales
- Family: Orchidaceae
- Subfamily: Epidendroideae
- Tribe: Cymbidieae
- Subtribe: Eulophiinae
- Genus: × Graphiella hort.

Genus of orchids

× Graphiella, abbreviated in trade journals Grpla, is an intergeneric hybrid between the orchid genera Cymbidiella and Graphorkis (Cymla × Grks).
