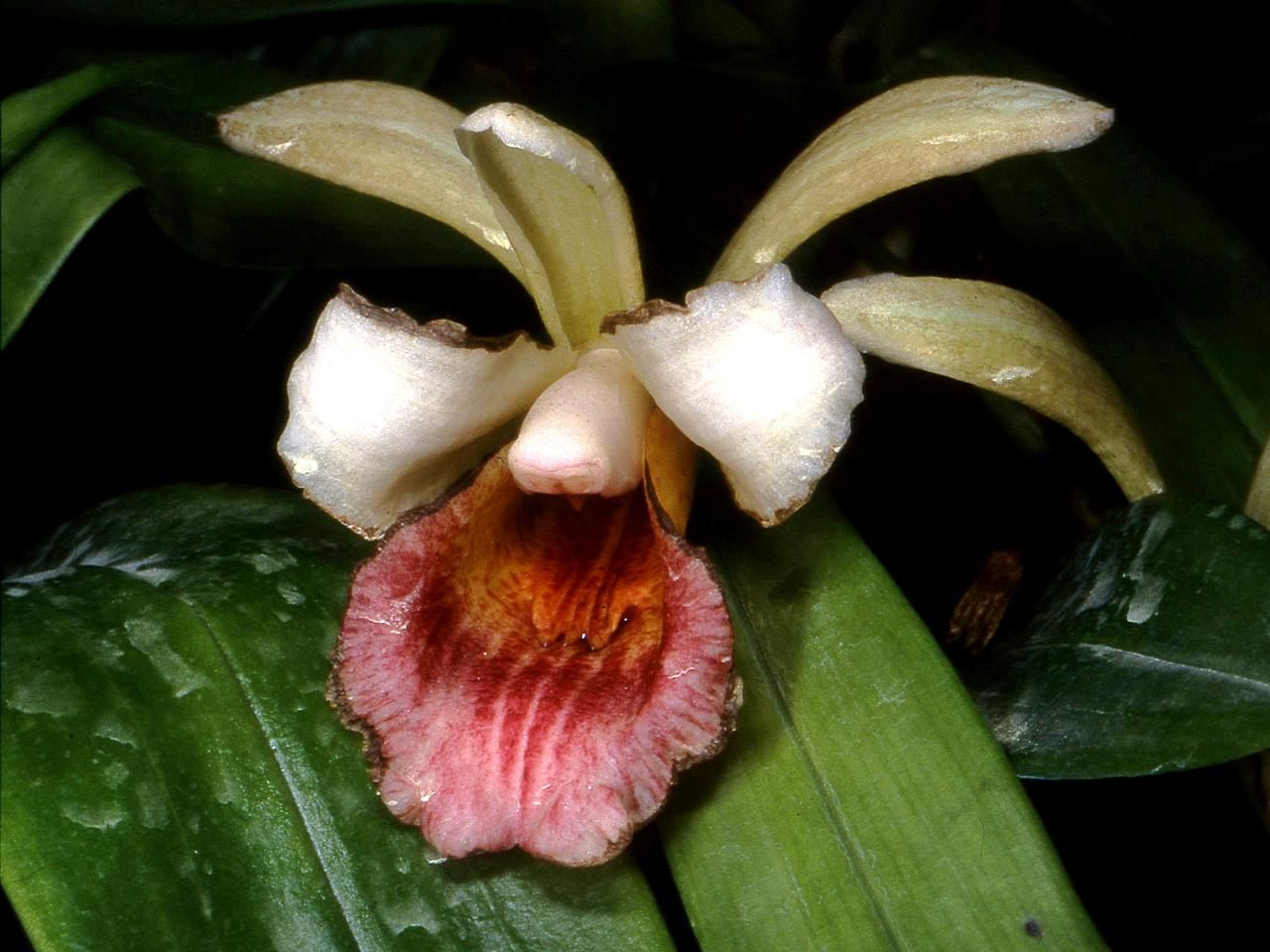
- Chondrorhyncha hirtzii

Scientific classification
- Kingdom: Plantae
- Clade: Tracheophytes
- Clade: Angiosperms
- Clade: Monocots
- Order: Asparagales
- Family: Orchidaceae
- Subfamily: Epidendroideae
- Tribe: Cymbidieae
- Subtribe: Zygopetalinae
- Genus: Chondrorhyncha; Lindl.

Type species
- Chondrorhyncha flaveola (Linden & Rchb. f. ex Rchb. f.) Garay.

= Chondrorhyncha =

Genus of orchids

Chondrorhyncha is a genus of flowering plants from the orchid family, Orchidaceae. At the present time 7 species are recognized, though many more names have been proposed. All species are native to Colombia, Venezuela and Ecuador.

1. Chondrorhyncha hirtzii Dodson - Ecuador
2. Chondrorhyncha inedita Dressler & Dalström - Colombia
3. Chondrorhyncha macronyx Kraenzl. - Colombia
4. Chondrorhyncha panguensis Dodson ex P.A.Harding - Ecuador
5. Chondrorhyncha rosea Lindl. - Colombia, Venezuela
6. Chondrorhyncha suarezii Dodson - Ecuador
7. Chondrorhyncha velastiguii Dodson - Ecuador

== See also ==
- List of Orchidaceae genera
