= × Opsistylis =

Scientific classification
- Kingdom: Plantae
- Clade: Tracheophytes
- Clade: Angiosperms
- Clade: Monocots
- Order: Asparagales
- Family: Orchidaceae
- Subfamily: Epidendroideae
- Tribe: Vandeae
- Subtribe: Aeridinae
- Genus: × Opsistylis hort.

Genus of orchids

× Opsistylis, abbreviated Opst. in the horticultural trade, is a nothogenus for intergeneric hybrids between the orchid genera Rhynchostylis and Vandopsis (Rhy. x Vdps.).
