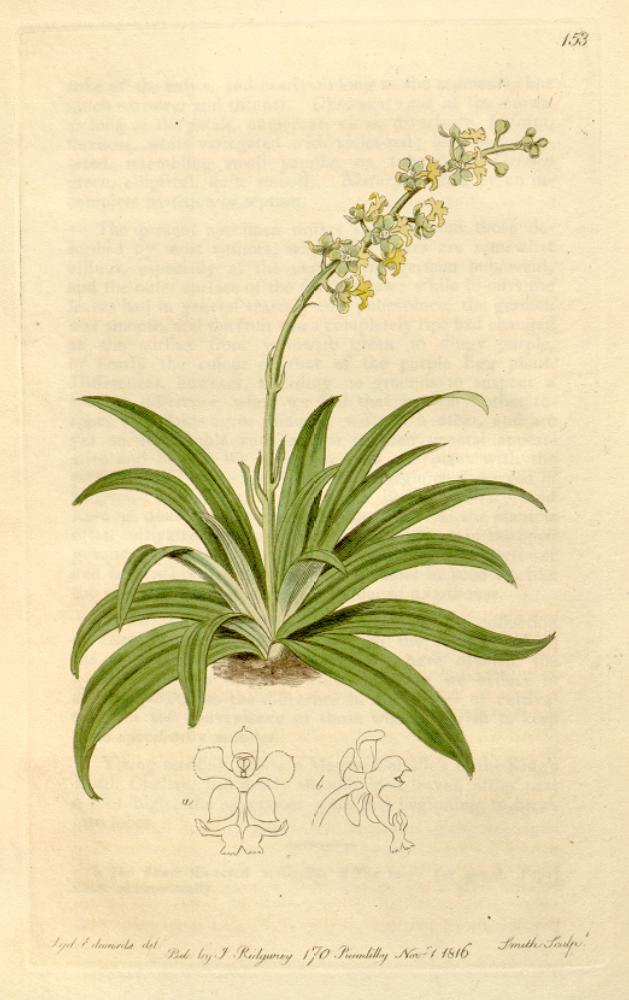
- Cryptarrhena lunata 1816 illustration from The botanical register (inaccurate as the inflorescence should be pendulous)

Scientific classification
- Kingdom: Plantae
- Clade: Tracheophytes
- Clade: Angiosperms
- Clade: Monocots
- Order: Asparagales
- Family: Orchidaceae
- Subfamily: Epidendroideae
- Tribe: Cymbidieae
- Subtribe: Zygopetalinae
- Genus: Cryptarrhena; R.Br.

Synonyms
- Clinhymenia A.Rich. & Galeotti; Orchidofunckia A.Rich. & Galeotti

= Cryptarrhena =

Genus of orchids

Cryptarrhena is a genus of orchids (family Orchidaceae). It consists of 3 known species, native to the New World Tropics.

== List of species ==
- Cryptarrhena guatemalensis Schltr. (1911) - Central America, Trinidad, South America as far south as Brazil and Peru
- Cryptarrhena kegelii Rchb.f. (1852) - South America as far south as Brazil and Bolivia
- Cryptarrhena lunata R.Br. (1816) - Mexico, Central America, Colombia, Peru, Trinidad, Jamaica
