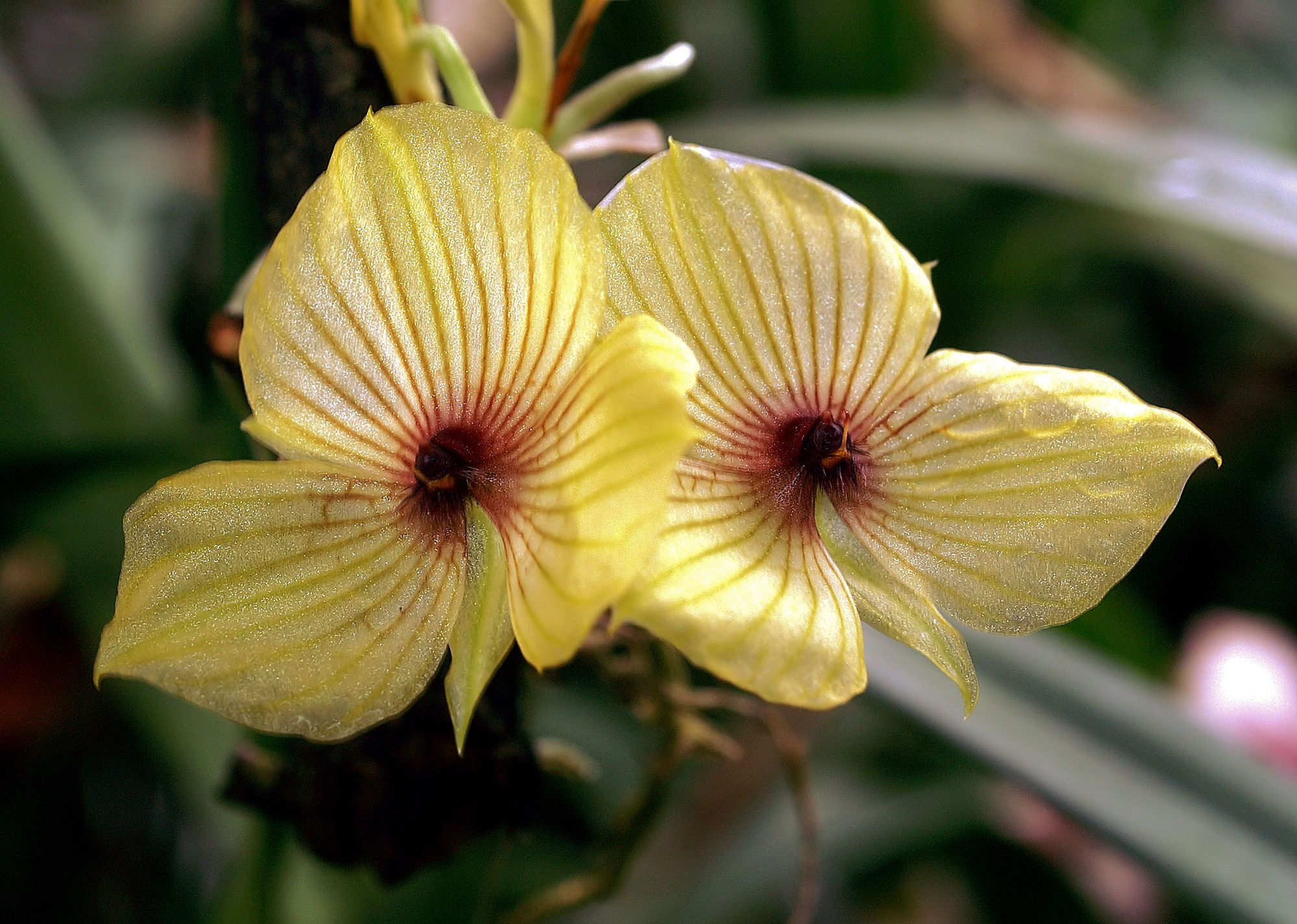
- Telipogon papilio

Scientific classification
- Kingdom: Plantae
- Clade: Tracheophytes
- Clade: Angiosperms
- Clade: Monocots
- Order: Asparagales
- Family: Orchidaceae
- Subfamily: Epidendroideae
- Tribe: Cymbidieae
- Subtribe: Oncidiinae
- Genus: Telipogon; Kunth

Synonyms
- Darwiniella Braas & Lückel; Stellilabium Schltr.; Dipterostele Schltr.; Sodiroella Schltr.; Cordanthera L.O.Williams; Astroglossus Rchb.f. ex Benth. & Hook.f., illegitimate; Darwiniella Braas & Lückel, illegitimate; Darwiniera Braas & Lückel; Telopogon Spreng 1817; Thelypogon Mutis ex Spreng 1826

= Telipogon =

Genus of orchids

Telipogon is a genus of flowering plants from the orchid family, Orchidaceae. It is a large genus with dozens of species, native to South America, Central America, Hispaniola and southern Mexico.

== Species ==
- Telipogon acicularis (Dressler) N.H.Williams & Dressler 2005
- Telipogon albertii Rchb.f. (1876
- Telipogon alegriae D.E.Benn. & Christenson 2001
- Telipogon alexii N.H.Williams & Dressler 2005
- Telipogon alticola (Dodson & R.Escobar) N.H.Williams & Dressler 2005
- Telipogon ampliflorus C.Schweinf. 1938
- Telipogon anacristinae (Pupulin) N.H.Williams & Dressler 2005
- Telipogon andicola Rchb.f. 1855
- Telipogon andreetae Dodson & Hirtz 2004
- Telipogon antioquianus Rchb.f. 1876
- Telipogon antonietae D.E.Benn. & Ric.Fernández 1992
- Telipogon ardeltianus Braas 1981
- Telipogon ariasii Dodson & D.E.Benn. 1989
- Telipogon astroglossus Rchb.f. 1854
- Telipogon asuayanus Rchb.f. 1876
- Telipogon atropurpurea D.E.Benn. & Ric.Fernández 1992
- Telipogon aureus Lindl. 1845
- Telipogon auriculatus D.E.Benn. & Christenson 2001
- Telipogon auritus Rchb.f. 1876
- Telipogon australis Dodson & Hirtz 2004
- Telipogon ballesteroi Dodson & R.Escobar 1987
- Telipogon barbozae (J.T.Atwood & Dressler) N.H.Williams & Dressler 2005
- Telipogon benedicti Rchb.f. 1876
- Telipogon bennettii (Dodson & R.Escobar) N.H.Williams & Dressler 2005
- Telipogon bergoldii (Garay & Dunst.) Senghas & Lückel 1994
- Telipogon berthae P.Ortiz 1994
- Telipogon biolleyi Schltr. 1911
- Telipogon boissierianus Rchb.f. 1856
- Telipogon boliviensis (R.Vásquez & Dodson) N.H.Williams & Dressler 2005
- Telipogon bombiformis Dressler 2003
- Telipogon bowmanii Rchb.f. 1876
- Telipogon boylei (J.T.Atwood) N.H.Williams & Dressler 2005
- Telipogon bullpenensis (J.T.Atwood) N.H.Williams & Dressler 2005
- Telipogon butcheri Dodson & R.Escobar 1993
- Telipogon butchii N.H.Williams & Dressler 2005
- Telipogon calueri N.H.Williams & Dressler 2005
- Telipogon campbelliorum (J.T.Atwood) N.H.Williams & Dressler 2005.
- Telipogon campoverdei D.E.Benn. & Ric.Fernández 1992
- Telipogon caroliae Dodson & R.Escobar 1987
- Telipogon cascajalensis Dodson & R.Escobar 1987
- Telipogon caucanus Schltr. 1920
- Telipogon caulescens Dressler 2003
- Telipogon chiriquensis Dodson & R.Escobar 1993
- Telipogon christobalensis Kraenzl. 1920
- Telipogon chrysocrates Rchb.f. 1876
- Telipogon collantesii D.E.Benn. & Christenson 2001
- Telipogon costaricensis Schltr. 1911
- Telipogon cuscoensis Nauray & Christenson 2003
- Telipogon cuyujensis Dodson 1989
- Telipogon dalstromii Dodson 1984
- Telipogon davidsonii D.E.Benn. & Christenson 2001
- Telipogon dendriticus Rchb.f. 1878
- Telipogon distantiflorus (Ames & C.Schweinf.) N.H.Williams & Dressler 2005.
- Telipogon dodsonii Braas 1985
- Telipogon dubius Rchb.f. 1876
- Telipogon eberhardtii Braas 1985
- Telipogon ecuadorensis Schltr. 1921
- Telipogon elcimeyae Braas & Horich 1982
- Telipogon embreei N.H.Williams & Dressler 2005.
- Telipogon erratus (Dressler) N.H.Williams & Dressler 2005.
- Telipogon falcatus Linden & Rchb.f. 1854
- Telipogon fortunae (Dressler) N.H.Williams & Dressler 2005.
- Telipogon fritillum Rchb.f. & Warsz. 1854
- Telipogon frymirei Dodson 1984
- Telipogon genegeorgei D.E.Benn. & Ric.Fernández 1992
- Telipogon glicensteinii Dodson & R.Escobar 1987
- Telipogon gnomus Schltr. 1921
- Telipogon gracilipes Schltr. 1923
- Telipogon gracilis Schltr. 1920
- Telipogon griesbeckii Dressler 2003
- Telipogon guacamayensis Dodson & R.Escobar 1989
- Telipogon guila Dodson & R.Escobar 1987
- Telipogon gymnostele Rchb.f. 1876
- Telipogon hagsateri Dodson & R.Escobar 1993
- Telipogon hartwegii Rchb.f. 1878
- Telipogon hastatus Rchb.f. 1876
- Telipogon hauschildianus Braas 1982
- Telipogon hausmannianus Rchb.f. 1861
- Telipogon helleri (L.O.Williams) N.H.Williams & Dressler 2005.
- Telipogon hemimelas Rchb.f. 1876
- Telipogon hercules Rchb.f. ex Kraenzl. 1920
- Telipogon hirtzii Dodson & R.Escobar 1989
- Telipogon hoppii Schltr. 1924
- Telipogon hutchisonii Dodson & D.E.Benn. 1989
- Telipogon hystrix (Dodson) N.H.Williams & Dressler 2005.
- Telipogon ibischii (R.Vásquez) N.H.Williams & Dressler 2005.
- Telipogon immaculatus Christenson 2001
- Telipogon intis Braas 1981
- Telipogon ionopogon Rchb.f. 1876
- Telipogon isabelae Dodson & Hirtz 2004
- Telipogon jimburensis Dodson & R.Escobar 1989
- Telipogon jostii (Dodson) N.H.Williams & Dressler 2005.
- Telipogon jucusbambae Dodson & R.Escobar 1998
- Telipogon kalbreyerianus Kraenzl. 1920
- Telipogon karsteae Dodson & Ed.Sánchez 2004
- Telipogon klotzscheanus Rchb.f. 1850
- Telipogon lagunae Schltr. 1924
- Telipogon lankesteri Ames 1923
- Telipogon latifolius Kunth in F.W.H.von Humboldt 1816
- Telipogon lehmannii Schltr. 1920
- Telipogon leila-alexandrae Braas 1985
- Telipogon loxensis Dodson & Hirtz 2004
- Telipogon lueri Dodson & D.E.Benn. 1989
- Telipogon machupicchuensis Nauray & Christenson 2003
- Telipogon macroglottis Rchb.f. 1876
- Telipogon maduroi Dressler 2003
- Telipogon maldonadoensis Dodson & R.Escobar 1998
- Telipogon medusae Dressler 2006
- Telipogon mendiolae Dodson & D.E.Benn. 1989
- Telipogon microglossus (Schltr.) N.H.Williams & Dressler 2005.
- Telipogon minutiflorus Kraenzl. 1920
- Telipogon monteverdensis (J.T.Atwood) N.H.Williams & Dressler 2005.
- Telipogon monticola L.O.Williams 1970
- Telipogon morganiae (Dodson) N.H.Williams & Dressler 2005.
- Telipogon morii (Dressler) N.H.Williams & Dressler 2005.
- Telipogon musaicus Rchb.f. 1876
- Telipogon nervosus (L.) Druce 1917
- Telipogon nirii Ackerman 2004
- Telipogon nitens Rchb.f. 1876
- Telipogon obovatus Lindl. 1847
- Telipogon ochraceus Garay 1956
- Telipogon octavioi Dodson & R.Escobar 1993
- Telipogon olmosii Dressler 2006
- Telipogon ortizii Dodson & R.Escobar 1993
- Telipogon ospinae Dodson & R.Escobar 1993
- Telipogon pachensis Rchb.f. 1876
- Telipogon pampatamboensis (Dodson & R.Vásquez) N.H.Williams & Dressler 2005.
- Telipogon pamplonensis Rchb.f. 1858
- Telipogon panamensis Dodson & R.Escobar 1993
- Telipogon papilio Rchb.f. & Warsz. 1854
- Telipogon parvulus C.Schweinf. 1937
- Telipogon pastoanus Schltr. 1920
- Telipogon patinii Rchb.f. 1876
- Telipogon penningtonii Dodson & R.Escobar 1989
- Telipogon perlobatus (Senghas) N.H.Williams & Dressler 2005.
- Telipogon personatus Dressler 2006
- Telipogon peruvianus T.Hashim. 1990
- Telipogon pfavii Schltr. 1921
- Telipogon phalaena Rchb.f. ex Kraenzl. 1920
- Telipogon phalaenopsis Braas 1981
- Telipogon piyacnuensis D.E.Benn. & Christenson 2001
- Telipogon pogonostalix Rchb.f. 1876
- Telipogon polymerus Rchb.f. 1876
- Telipogon polyneuros Rchb.f. ex Kraenzl. 1920
- Telipogon polyrrhizus Rchb.f. 1878
- Telipogon portillae Christenson 2003
- Telipogon portilloi Dodson & R.Escobar 1987
- Telipogon pseudobulbosus (D.E.Benn. & Christenson) N.H.Williams & Dressler 2005.
- Telipogon pulcher Rchb.f. 1876
- Telipogon puruantensis Dodson & R.Escobar 1998
- Telipogon putumayensis Dodson & R.Escobar 1993
- Telipogon radiatus Rchb.f. 1876
- Telipogon retanarum Dodson & R.Escobar 1987
- Telipogon reventadorensis N.H.Williams & Dressler 2005.
- Telipogon rhombipetalus C.Schweinf. 1946
- Telipogon roberti N.H.Williams & Dressler 2005.
- Telipogon roseus Garay 1956
- Telipogon salinasiae Farfán & Moretz 2003
- Telipogon sanchezii Dodson & Hirtz 2004
- Telipogon saraguroensis Dodson & Ed.Sánchez 2004
- Telipogon sayakoae D.E.Benn. & Christenson 2000
- Telipogon schmidtchenii Rchb.f. ex Kraenzl. 1920
- Telipogon seibertii Dodson & R.Escobar 1993
- Telipogon selbyanus N.H.Williams & Dressler 2005.
- Telipogon semipictus Rchb.f. ex Kraenzl. 1920
- Telipogon setosus Ames 1938
- Telipogon smaragdinus (Pupulin & M.A.Blanco) N.H.Williams & Dressler 2005.
- Telipogon standleyi Ames 1925
- Telipogon steinii Dodson & R.Escobar 1989
- Telipogon steyermarkii Foldats 1968
- Telipogon stinae Dodson & Dalström 1984
- Telipogon storkii Ames & C.Schweinf. 1930
- Telipogon suarezii D.E.Benn. & Christenson 2001
- Telipogon suffusus Rchb.f. ex Kraenzl. 1920
- Telipogon tabanensis Dodson & R.Escobar 1993
- Telipogon tamboensis Dodson & Hirtz 2004
- Telipogon tayacajaensis D.E.Benn. & Christenson 2001
- Telipogon tesselatus Lindl. in G.Bentham 1845
- Telipogon thomasii Dodson & R.Escobar 1989
- Telipogon tsipiriensis (Pupulin) N.H.Williams & Dressler 2005.
- Telipogon tungurahuae Dodson & R.Escobar 1998
- Telipogon urceolatus C.Schweinf. 1947
- Telipogon valenciae Dodson & R.Escobar 1993
- Telipogon vampyrus Braas & Horich 1982
- Telipogon vasquezii Dodson 1984
- Telipogon venustus Schltr. 1920
- Telipogon vieirae Dodson & R.Escobar 1993
- Telipogon vollesii Dodson & R.Escobar 1993
- Telipogon vulcanicus Dodson & Hirtz 2004
- Telipogon wallisii Rchb.f. 1876
- Telipogon zephyrinus Rchb.f. 1876

== See also ==
- List of Orchidaceae genera
