= Helonoma =

Scientific classification
- Kingdom: Plantae
- Clade: Tracheophytes
- Clade: Angiosperms
- Clade: Monocots
- Order: Asparagales
- Family: Orchidaceae
- Subfamily: Orchidoideae
- Tribe: Cranichideae
- Subtribe: Spiranthinae
- Genus: Helonoma; Garay

Synonyms
- Wallnoeferia Szlach.

Genus of orchids

Helonoma is a genus of flowering plants from the orchid family, Orchidaceae. It includes 4 known species, all native to South America.

- Helonoma americana (C.Schweinf. & Garay) Garay - Venezuela, Ecuador
- Helonoma bifida (Ridl.) Garay - Venezuela, Guyana, Brazil
- Helonoma chiropterae (Szlach.) Carnevali & G.A.Romero in G.A.Romero & G.Carnevali - Venezuela
- Helonoma peruviana (Szlach.) Salazar, H.C.Dueñas & Fern.Alonso - Colombia, Peru

== See also ==
- List of Orchidaceae genera
