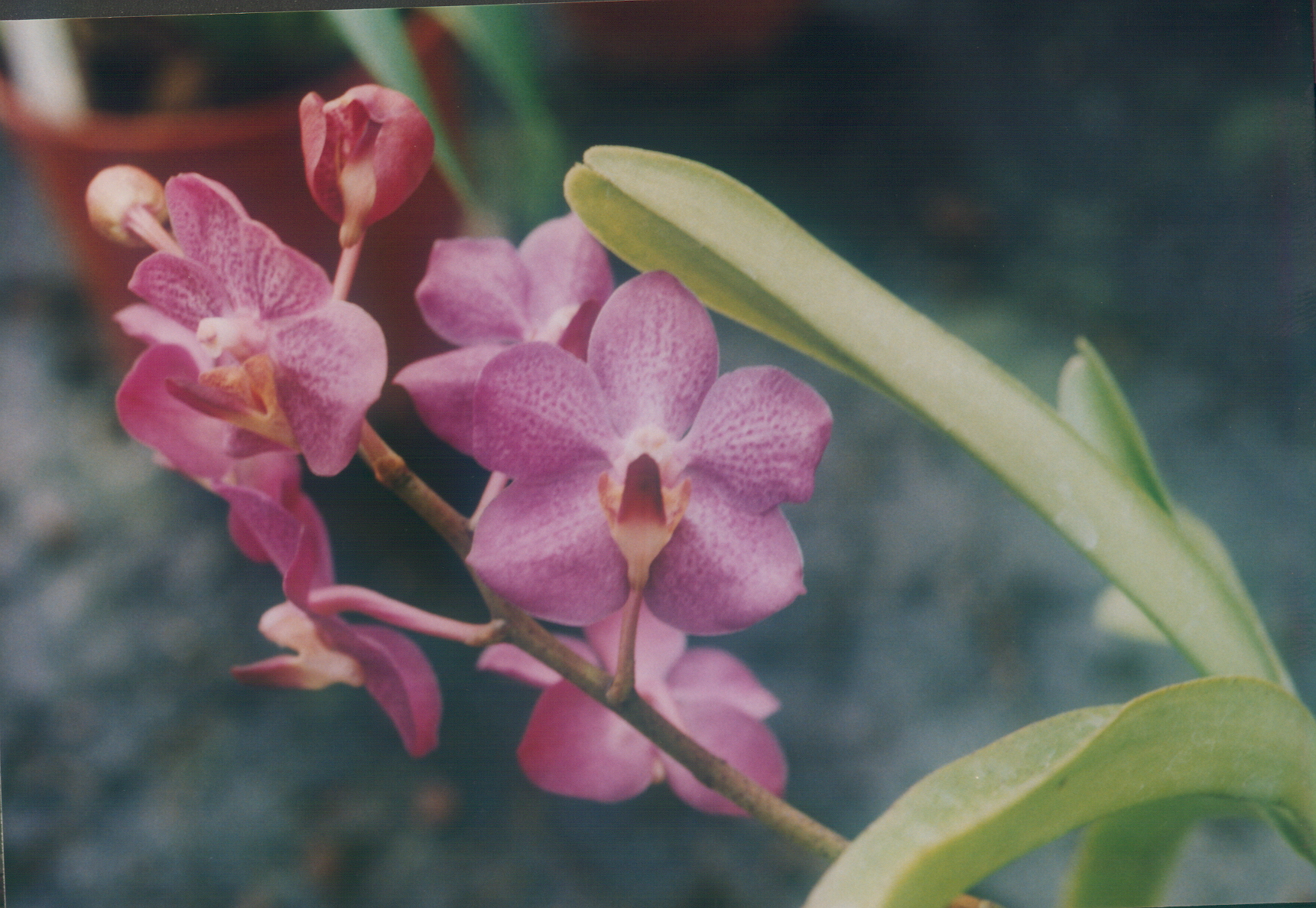
- × Aeridovanda Jeannie Sidran

Scientific classification
- Kingdom: Plantae
- Clade: Tracheophytes
- Clade: Angiosperms
- Clade: Monocots
- Order: Asparagales
- Family: Orchidaceae
- Subfamily: Epidendroideae
- Tribe: Vandeae
- Subtribe: Aeridinae
- Genus: × Aeridovanda

= × Aeridovanda =

Genus of flowering plants

× Aeridovanda, abbreviated in trade journals Aerdv, is an intergeneric hybrid between the orchid genera Aerides and Vanda (Aer x V). It is now the accepted name for several former hybrid genera, since Ascocentrum and Neofinetia are now both synonymous with Vanda.
