= × Eulocymbidiella =

Scientific classification
- Kingdom: Plantae
- Clade: Tracheophytes
- Clade: Angiosperms
- Clade: Monocots
- Order: Asparagales
- Family: Orchidaceae
- Subfamily: Epidendroideae
- Tribe: Cymbidieae
- Subtribe: Eulophiinae
- Genus: × Eulocymbidiella hort.

Genus of orchids

× Eulocymbidiella, abbreviated in trade journals Eucmla, is an intergeneric hybrid between the orchid genera Cymbidiella and Eulophiella (Cymla × Eul).
