= × Elecalthusa =

Scientific classification
- Kingdom: Plantae
- Clade: Tracheophytes
- Clade: Angiosperms
- Clade: Monocots
- Order: Asparagales
- Family: Orchidaceae
- Subfamily: Epidendroideae
- Tribe: Arethuseae
- Subtribe: Arethusinae
- Genus: × Elecalthusa hort.

Species of orchid

× Elecalthusa is an intergeneric hybrid of orchids (family Orchidaceae). Its parents' genera are Arethusa, Calopogon and Eleorchis. Its abbreviation is Ecth.
