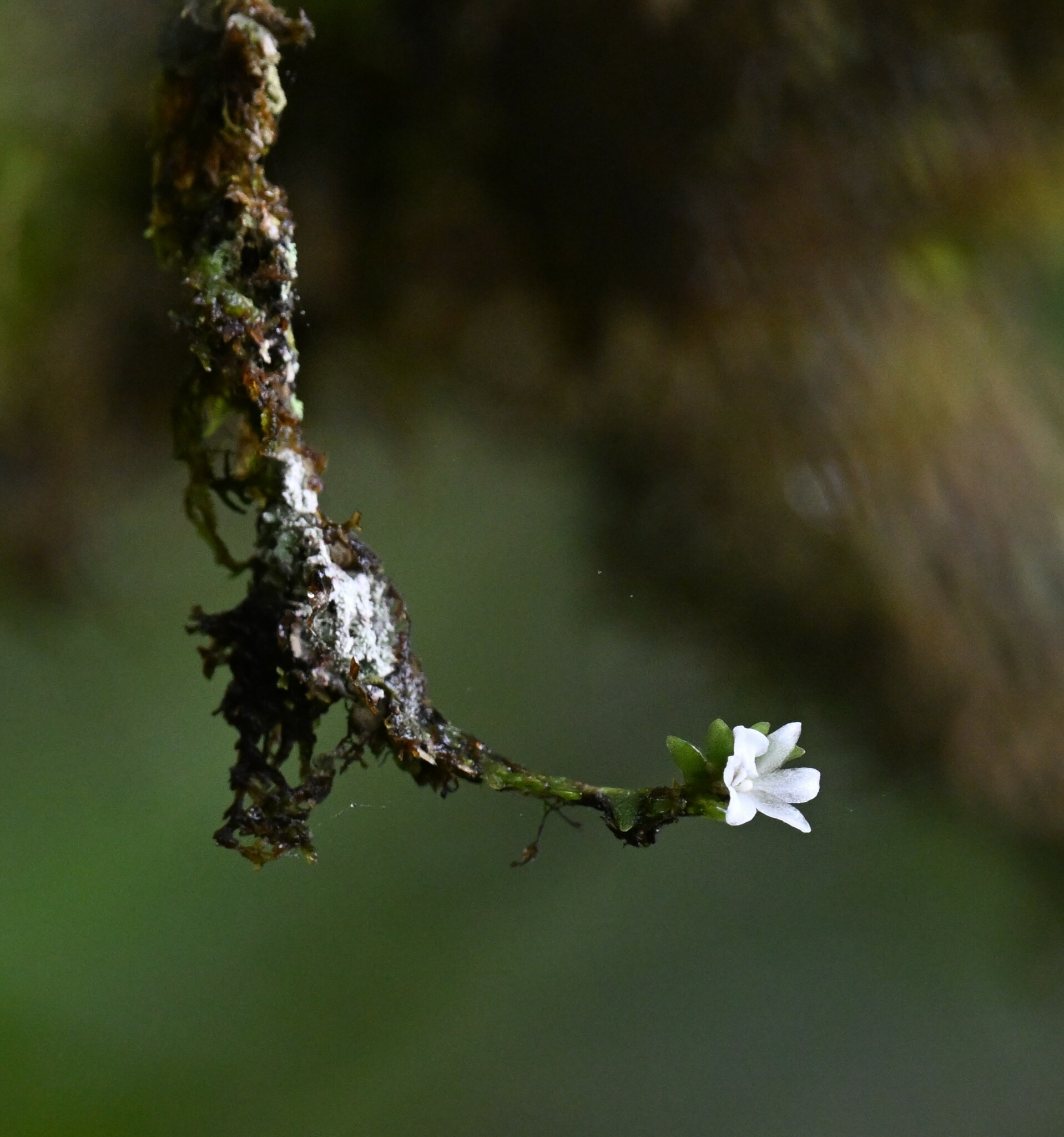
- Jejewoodia jiewhoei

Scientific classification
- Kingdom: Plantae
- Clade: Tracheophytes
- Clade: Angiosperms
- Clade: Monocots
- Order: Asparagales
- Family: Orchidaceae
- Subfamily: Epidendroideae
- Tribe: Vandeae
- Subtribe: Aeridinae
- Genus: Jejewoodia; Szlach.

= Jejewoodia =

Genus of flowering plants belonging to the family Orchidaceae

Jejewoodia is a genus of flowering plants belonging to the family Orchidaceae. It is native to Borneo.

== Description ==
Epiphytic herbs. Has a stem that grows up to about 20 cm (8 in) long which is simple or branching. It has rooting at base and is leafy. The leaves are distichous (arranged in two opposite rows), ensiform (shaped like the blade) and flattened. The inflorescence (flower) is lateral, axillary and borne from upper portion of stems. It is one-flowered (per stem), sometimes four or five flowers open simultaneously in succession per stem. The floral bracts are less than 1/8 the length of pedicel (stalk of a flower) and brownish in colour. The flowers are up to 1 cm in diameter and usually opening widely. The sepals and petals are white, less often yellow or greenish yellow. The labellum (lip) is white, sometimes with a yellow central patch at base of mid-lobe. The sepals and petals are free (unattached) and spreading. The sepals are narrowly elliptic and acute in shape. The petals are broadly elliptic and obtuse or narrowly oblong and subacute in shape. The labellum is tri-lobed, pandurate (shaped like a fiddle), spurred or slightly saccate. It is constricted near middle and hypochile (hood-shaped portion) is canaliculate (channelled) and thickened at the margins. The margins are erect, epichile (the upper part of the jointed lip) is transversely elliptic and emarginate with a broadly triangular tooth in sinus, or rounded and thick. The spur (when present) is narrow and shallowly conical, with an entrance glabrous (plain). The column foot is absent. The anther is apically elongated, with 4 pollinia (a coherent mass of pollen grains) and ovoid, unequal, viscidium transversely elliptic, the stipe is linear. The rostellum (beak) is finger-like.

== Taxonomy ==
The genus name of Jejewoodia is in honour of Jeffrey James Wood (b. 1952), an English botanist at Kew Gardens and a specialist in orchids. It was first described and published in Fragm. Florist. Geobot., Suppl. Vol.3 on page 135 in 1995.

== Known species ==
According to Kew:

- Jejewoodia crockerensis J.J.Wood & A.L.Lamb
- Jejewoodia jiewhoei (J.J.Wood & Shim) Szlach.
- Jejewoodia jongirii J.J.Wood & A.L.Lamb
- Jejewoodia linusii J.J.Wood & A.L.Lamb
- Jejewoodia longicalcarata (Ames & C.Schweinf.) J.J.Wood
- Jejewoodia rimauensis J.J.Wood & A.L.Lamb
