= Orchipedum =

Orchipedum is the scientific name of two genera of organisms and may refer to:

- Orchipedum (plant), an orchid genus in the subfamily Orchidoideae
- Orchipedum (flatworm), a flatworm genus in the family Orchipedidae
