= Meliorchis =

Meliorchis Temporal range: 15–20 Ma Miocene

Scientific classification
- Kingdom: Plantae
- Clade: Tracheophytes
- Clade: Angiosperms
- Clade: Monocots
- Order: Asparagales
- Family: Orchidaceae
- Subfamily: Orchidoideae
- Tribe: Cranichideae
- Subtribe: Goodyerinae
- Genus: †Meliorchis; S.R.Ramírez, B.Gravendell, R.B.Singer, C.R.Marshall & N.E.Pierce
- Species: †M. caribea

Binomial name
- †Meliorchis caribea S.R.Ramírez, B.Gravendell, R.B.Singer, C.R.Marshall & N.E.Pierce

Extinct genus of orchids

Meliorchis caribea is an extinct, early to middle Miocene orchid known only from a packet of pollen attached to the wing of a stingless bee, Proplebeia dominicana, trapped in Dominican amber. It was the first fossil orchid ever described, and allowed for a revised estimate of the time of origin of the Orchidaceae to the Mesozoic. Morphology of the pollinium suggests that M. caribea is closely related to the modern genus Ligeophila.
