= List of Microchilus species =

The following 261 species of orchids in the flowering plant genus Microchilus, are accepted by Plants of the World Online.

- Microchilus aguindae Ormerod
- Microchilus alajuelae (Ormerod) E.C.Smidt & M.W.Chase
- Microchilus alzatei Ormerod
- Microchilus amazonicus (Garay) E.C.Smidt & M.W.Chase
- Microchilus anchorifer (Schltr.) Ormerod
- Microchilus anderssonii Ormerod
- Microchilus andrei Ormerod
- Microchilus antioquiensis Szlach. & Kolan.
- Microchilus arevaloi Szlach. & Kolan.
- Microchilus argenteus (Vell.) E.C.Smidt & M.W.Chase
- Microchilus arietinus (Rchb.f. & Warm.) Ormerod
- Microchilus aspidogynoides Ormerod
- Microchilus astilleroensis Ormerod
- Microchilus atalayae Ormerod
- Microchilus austrobrasiliensis (Porsch) Ormerod
- Microchilus bangii Ormerod
- Microchilus bicornutus (Cogn.) E.C.Smidt & M.W.Chase
- Microchilus bidentiferus (Schltr.) E.C.Smidt & M.W.Chase
- Microchilus bimentatus (Dressler) Ormerod
- Microchilus boliviensis (Cogn.) E.C.Smidt & M.W.Chase
- Microchilus borjaquijosae Ormerod
- Microchilus boyacanus Ormerod
- Microchilus brachyplectron (Pabst) Ormerod
- Microchilus brachyrrhynchus (Rchb.f.) E.C.Smidt & M.W.Chase
- Microchilus bravocollinus Ormerod
- Microchilus brunnescens Ormerod
- Microchilus bruxelii (Pabst) E.C.Smidt & M.W.Chase
- Microchilus buchtienii (Schltr.) Ormerod
- Microchilus bugabae (Ormerod) E.C.Smidt & M.W.Chase
- Microchilus cajamarcae (Ormerod) E.C.Smidt & M.W.Chase
- Microchilus callejasii Ormerod
- Microchilus callophylloides (Garay) Ormerod
- Microchilus calophyllus (Rchb.f.) Ormerod
- Microchilus campanensis Ormerod
- Microchilus campanulatus Ormerod
- Microchilus canaliculatus Ormerod
- Microchilus canarensis (Ormerod) Szlach. & Kolan.
- Microchilus capitatus Ormerod
- Microchilus caraguatatubensis (M.R.Miranda, Engels & E.C.Smidt) E.C.Smidt & M.W.Chase
- Microchilus caramantae Ormerod
- Microchilus carauchanus (Ormerod) E.C.Smidt & M.W.Chase
- Microchilus carbonerae Ormerod
- Microchilus carchiensis Ormerod
- Microchilus carinatus Ormerod
- Microchilus carlos-parrae Szlach. & Kolan.
- Microchilus casillasii (R.González) E.C.Smidt & M.W.Chase
- Microchilus caucanus (Schltr.) Ormerod
- Microchilus ceratostele Ormerod
- Microchilus chicalensis Ormerod
- Microchilus chingualensis Ormerod
- Microchilus chocoensis (Ormerod) E.C.Smidt & M.W.Chase
- Microchilus claviger (Rchb.f.) E.C.Smidt & M.W.Chase
- Microchilus colombianus (Garay) E.C.Smidt & M.W.Chase
- Microchilus commelinoides (Barb.Rodr.) E.C.Smidt & M.W.Chase
- Microchilus confusus (C.Schweinf.) E.C.Smidt & M.W.Chase
- Microchilus constrictus Ormerod
- Microchilus corniculatus (Rchb.f.) E.C.Smidt & M.W.Chase
- Microchilus costaricensis (Ormerod & M.A.Blanco) E.C.Smidt & M.W.Chase
- Microchilus crassibasis Ormerod
- Microchilus crispifolius (Garay) E.C.Smidt & M.W.Chase
- Microchilus croatii Ormerod
- Microchilus cruciformis (Ormerod) E.C.Smidt & M.W.Chase
- Microchilus cundinamarcae Ormerod
- Microchilus curvatus (Ormerod) E.C.Smidt & M.W.Chase
- Microchilus curviflorus Ormerod
- Microchilus cuscoensis Kolan. & Szlach.
- Microchilus dasilvae Engels & E.C.Smidt
- Microchilus debilis (Lindl.) D.Dietr.
- Microchilus decorus (Rchb.f.) E.C.Smidt & M.W.Chase
- Microchilus diaphanus (Szlach. & Kolan.) E.C.Smidt & M.W.Chase
- Microchilus dolichostachys (Schltr.) Ormerod
- Microchilus dryanderae Ormerod
- Microchilus ecuadorensis (Garay) Ormerod
- Microchilus elatus (L.O.Williams) E.C.Smidt & M.W.Chase
- Microchilus ensicalcar Ormerod
- Microchilus epiphyticus (Dressler) Ormerod
- Microchilus erythrodoides (Schltr.) Ormerod
- Microchilus familiaris Ormerod
- Microchilus federalensis (Ormerod) Meneguzzo
- Microchilus fendleri Ormerod
- Microchilus fimbrillaris (Lindl.) E.C.Smidt & M.W.Chase
- Microchilus foliosus (Poepp. & Endl.) D.Dietr.
- Microchilus forceps (Ormerod) Ormerod
- Microchilus fosbergii Ormerod
- Microchilus fosteri Ormerod
- Microchilus frontinoensis Ormerod
- Microchilus fuscatus Ormerod
- Microchilus garayi E.C.Smidt & M.W.Chase
- Microchilus gavilanensis (Ormerod & G.A.Romero) E.C.Smidt & M.W.Chase
- Microchilus gentryi Ormerod
- Microchilus giganteus (Dodson) E.C.Smidt & M.W.Chase
- Microchilus giraldo-gensinii Ormerod
- Microchilus glacensis (Dod) Ormerod
- Microchilus globosicalcar Szlach. & Kolan.
- Microchilus globosus Ormerod
- Microchilus goaltalensis (Ormerod) E.C.Smidt & M.W.Chase
- Microchilus grandis (Ormerod) E.C.Smidt & M.W.Chase
- Microchilus grayumii (Ormerod) E.C.Smidt & M.W.Chase
- Microchilus guianensis Ormerod
- Microchilus harlingii (Ormerod) E.C.Smidt & M.W.Chase
- Microchilus haughtii Ormerod
- Microchilus herzogii (Schltr.) Ormerod
- Microchilus hetaerioides (Schltr.) Ormerod
- Microchilus hirtellus (Sw.) D.Dietr.
- Microchilus huangobioensis Ormerod
- Microchilus hughjonesii Ormerod
- Microchilus hylibates (Rchb.f.) E.C.Smidt & M.W.Chase
- Microchilus hyphaematicus (Rchb.f.) E.C.Smidt & M.W.Chase
- Microchilus ibaguensis Ormerod
- Microchilus integer Ormerod
- Microchilus jamesonii (Garay) E.C.Smidt & M.W.Chase
- Microchilus julianii E.C.Smidt & M.W.Chase
- Microchilus juruenensis (Hoehne) E.C.Smidt & M.W.Chase
- Microchilus jussariensis (Ormerod) E.C.Smidt & M.W.Chase
- Microchilus kuczynskii (Porsch) E.C.Smidt & M.W.Chase
- Microchilus kuduyariensis Ormerod
- Microchilus laegaardii Ormerod
- Microchilus lamprophyllus (Linden & Rchb.f.) Ormerod
- Microchilus laticalcar (Dod) Ormerod
- Microchilus lechleri Ormerod
- Microchilus leucostictus Rchb.f. ex Szlach. & Kolan.
- Microchilus libanoensis Ormerod
- Microchilus lindleyanus (Cogn.) E.C.Smidt & M.W.Chase
- Microchilus llanganetensis (Dodson) E.C.Smidt & M.W.Chase
- Microchilus longibracteatus (Soroka) E.C.Smidt & M.W.Chase
- Microchilus longicornu (Cogn.) E.C.Smidt & M.W.Chase
- Microchilus longiflorus Ormerod
- Microchilus loxoglottis (Rchb.f.) E.C.Smidt & M.W.Chase
- Microchilus lunifer (Schltr.) Ormerod
- Microchilus luteus (Garay) E.C.Smidt & M.W.Chase
- Microchilus luteynii Szlach. & Kolan.
- Microchilus maasii Ormerod
- Microchilus macarenae (Ormerod) E.C.Smidt & M.W.Chase
- Microchilus machalillae Ormerod
- Microchilus madrinanii Ormerod
- Microchilus major C.Presl
- Microchilus malmei (Kraenzl.) E.C.Smidt & M.W.Chase
- Microchilus marulandae Ormerod
- Microchilus mazarunensis Szlach., S.Nowak & Baranow
- Microchilus mendoncae (Brade & Pabst) E.C.Smidt & M.W.Chase
- Microchilus meridanus Ormerod
- Microchilus metallescens (Barb.Rodr.) E.C.Smidt & M.W.Chase
- Microchilus mexicanus (Ames) Ormerod
- Microchilus micayvallis Ormerod
- Microchilus microcalcar Ormerod
- Microchilus microcaprinus Ormerod
- Microchilus minor C.Presl
- Microchilus miravalleanus (Szlach. & Kolan.) E.C.Smidt & M.W.Chase
- Microchilus miserus (Ormerod) E.C.Smidt & M.W.Chase
- Microchilus montanus Szlach. & Kolan.
- Microchilus moritzii Ormerod
- Microchilus mosaicus (Ormerod) E.C.Smidt & M.W.Chase
- Microchilus multifoliatus (C.Schweinf.) E.C.Smidt & M.W.Chase
- Microchilus mutisii Szlach. & Kolan.
- Microchilus myrmex (Ormerod) E.C.Smidt & M.W.Chase
- Microchilus mystacinus (Rchb.f.) E.C.Smidt & M.W.Chase
- Microchilus nigrescens (Schltr.) Ormerod
- Microchilus nugax Ormerod
- Microchilus ormerodianus Kolan.
- Microchilus oroensis (Dodson) Ormerod
- Microchilus ortgiesii (Rchb.f.) Ormerod
- Microchilus ovalis Ormerod
- Microchilus ovatilabius (Ames & Correll) E.C.Smidt & M.W.Chase
- Microchilus ovatus (Lindl.) D.Dietr.
- Microchilus pacaizapae Ormerod
- Microchilus pachysepalus (Ormerod) E.C.Smidt & M.W.Chase
- Microchilus paleaceus (Schltr.) Ormerod
- Microchilus palmazuensis Ormerod
- Microchilus panamanicus Ormerod
- Microchilus paraisoensis Ormerod
- Microchilus parvilabrum Ormerod
- Microchilus pauciflorus (Poepp. & Endl.) D.Dietr.
- Microchilus pedicellatus (Cogn.) E.C.Smidt & M.W.Chase
- Microchilus pedrojuanensis Ormerod
- Microchilus perijanus Ormerod
- Microchilus peterianus (Cogn.) E.C.Smidt & M.W.Chase
- Microchilus pilosus Szlach. & Kolan.
- Microchilus pimentelii Ormerod
- Microchilus plantagineus (L.) D.Dietr.
- Microchilus platanilloensis Ormerod
- Microchilus platensis (Hauman) E.C.Smidt & M.W.Chase
- Microchilus platysepalus Ormerod
- Microchilus plowmanii Ormerod
- Microchilus popayanensis (Ormerod) E.C.Smidt & M.W.Chase
- Microchilus preslii Ormerod
- Microchilus procerus (Schltr.) Ormerod
- Microchilus pseudobrunnescens Ormerod
- Microchilus pseudocaucanus Ormerod
- Microchilus pseudominor Ormerod
- Microchilus pumilus (Cogn.) E.C.Smidt & M.W.Chase
- Microchilus putumayoensis Ormerod
- Microchilus puyoensis Ormerod
- Microchilus quadratus (Garay) Ormerod
- Microchilus querceticola (Lindl.) D.Dietr.
- Microchilus queremalensis Ormerod
- Microchilus quetamensis Ormerod
- Microchilus rariflorus (Lindl.) E.C.Smidt & M.W.Chase
- Microchilus reddeniae (Ormerod & Carnevali) E.C.Smidt & M.W.Chase
- Microchilus repens (Poepp. & Endl.) D.Dietr.
- Microchilus rioesmeraldae Ormerod
- Microchilus rioitayanus Ormerod
- Microchilus riopalenquensis Ormerod
- Microchilus robustus (C.Schweinf.) E.C.Smidt & M.W.Chase
- Microchilus roseoalbus (Dressler) E.C.Smidt & M.W.Chase
- Microchilus roseus (Lindl.) D.Dietr.
- Microchilus rotundifolius (Ormerod) E.C.Smidt & M.W.Chase
- Microchilus ruizteranii Ormerod
- Microchilus sanpabloensis Ormerod
- Microchilus sarmientoi Szlach. & Kolan.
- Microchilus schlechterianus (Hoehne) E.C.Smidt & M.W.Chase
- Microchilus schneideri Ormerod
- Microchilus schultesianus (Garay) Ormerod
- Microchilus scrotiformis (C.Schweinf.) Ormerod
- Microchilus secundus (Ames) E.C.Smidt & M.W.Chase
- Microchilus serripetalus (Garay) E.C.Smidt & M.W.Chase
- Microchilus siberianus (Ormerod) E.C.Smidt & M.W.Chase
- Microchilus simplex (C.Schweinf.) E.C.Smidt & M.W.Chase
- Microchilus sororius (Garay) E.C.Smidt & M.W.Chase
- Microchilus sparreorum (Garay) Ormerod
- Microchilus sparsiflorus (Garay) E.C.Smidt & M.W.Chase
- Microchilus sprucei (Garay) Ormerod
- Microchilus stenocentron (Schltr.) E.C.Smidt & M.W.Chase
- Microchilus steyermarkii Szlach. & Kolan.
- Microchilus stictophyllus (Schltr.) E.C.Smidt & M.W.Chase
- Microchilus stigmatopterus (Rchb.f.) E.C.Smidt & M.W.Chase
- Microchilus subquadratus Ormerod
- Microchilus sumacoensis (Ormerod) E.C.Smidt & M.W.Chase
- Microchilus sytsmae (Ormerod) E.C.Smidt & M.W.Chase
- Microchilus tequendamae Ormerod
- Microchilus tessellatus Ormerod
- Microchilus topoensis Ormerod
- Microchilus trianae Ormerod
- Microchilus tribouillieri (Archila, Chiron & Szlach.) E.C.Smidt & M.W.Chase
- Microchilus tridax (Rchb.f.) Ormerod
- Microchilus trifasciatus Ormerod
- Microchilus tuerckheimii (Schltr.) E.C.Smidt & M.W.Chase
- Microchilus tulamengensis (Ormerod & Carnevali) E.C.Smidt & M.W.Chase
- Microchilus tunquianus Ormerod
- Microchilus umbraticola (Garay) E.C.Smidt & M.W.Chase
- Microchilus unicornis (Ormerod) E.C.Smidt & M.W.Chase
- Microchilus uribei Szlach. & Kolan.
- Microchilus utriculatus (Dressler) E.C.Smidt & M.W.Chase
- Microchilus valdivianus Ormerod
- Microchilus vallecaucanus Szlach. & Kolan.
- Microchilus valverdei Ormerod
- Microchilus venezuelanus (Garay & Dunst.) Ormerod
- Microchilus ventosus Ormerod
- Microchilus venustulus (Ames) E.C.Smidt & M.W.Chase
- Microchilus vesicifer (Rchb.f.) Ormerod
- Microchilus vesiculosus (Ormerod) E.C.Smidt & M.W.Chase
- Microchilus vilnerae Ormerod
- Microchilus viridissimus Ormerod
- Microchilus weberianus (Garay) Ormerod
- Microchilus whitefoordiae Ormerod
- Microchilus xeranthum Ormerod
- Microchilus xystophylloides (Garay) E.C.Smidt & M.W.Chase
- Microchilus xystophyllus (Rchb.f.) Ormerod
- Microchilus yungasensis M.C.Pace
- Microchilus zeuxinoides (Schltr.) Ormerod
- Microchilus zingarae Ormerod
- Microchilus zonatus (Ormerod) E.C.Smidt & M.W.Chase
