= Vrydagzynea elongata =

Tonsil orchid

Conservation status
- Endangered (EPBC Act)

Scientific classification
- Kingdom: Plantae
- Clade: Tracheophytes
- Clade: Angiosperms
- Clade: Monocots
- Order: Asparagales
- Family: Orchidaceae
- Subfamily: Orchidoideae
- Tribe: Cranichideae
- Subtribe: Goodyerinae
- Genus: Vrydagzynea
- Species: V. elongata

Binomial name
- Vrydagzynea elongata Blume

Synonyms
- Hetaeria elongata (Blume) Miq.; Vrydagzynea densa Schltr.; Vrydagzynea grayi D.L.Jones & M.A.Clem.; Vrydagzynea pachyceras Schltr.; Vrydagzynea papuana Rchb.f.; Vrydagzynea rectangulata J.J.Sm.

Species of orchid

Vrydagzynea elongata, commonly known as the tonsil orchid, is a species of orchid that is native to New Guinea, the Maluku Islands and far north Queensland. It has between four and seven dark green, egg-shaped leaves and a large number of white resupinate flowers which barely open.

== Description ==
Vrydagzynea elongata is a tuberous, perennial herb with between five and seven glossy dark green, egg-shaped leaves, 30–60 mm (1–2 in) long and about 20 mm (0.8 in) wide with wavy edges and arranged in a loose rosette. A large number of resupinate, tube-shaped white flowers about 4 mm (0.2 in) long and which barely open are crowded on a rachis 17–30 mm (0.7–1 in) long. The dorsal sepal and petals overlap and form a hood over the column. The labellum is heart-shaped, about 3.5 mm (0.1 in) long, 2 mm (0.08 in) wide and has a spur with two, more or less spherical, stalked glands about 1 mm (0.04 in) long. Flowering occurs in most months.

in 2004, David Jones and Mark Clements described Vrydagzynea grayi from a specimen collected by Bruce Gray in part of what is now the Daintree National Park and the description was published in The Orchadian. The Australian Plant Census lists Vrydagzynea elongata as a synonym of Vrydagzynea grayi, but V. elongata is the accepted name at Plants of the World Online.

== Taxonomy and naming ==
Vrydagzynea elongata was first formally described in 1858 by Carl Ludwig Blume from specimens collected in New Guinea in 1841. The description was published in his books Flora Javae et insularum adjacentium and Collection des orchidées les plus remarquables de l'Archipel indien et du Japon in the same year.

== Distribution and habitat ==
The tonsil orchid grows in forest including rainforest and forests in swamps near river mouths, and occurs in the Maluku Islands, New Guinea and in the Mossman to Daintree areas of far north Queensland.
