= Rhamphorhynchus (disambiguation) =

Rhamphorhynchus may refer to:

- Rhamphorhynchus, a genus of pterosaur
- Rhamphorhynchus, a former monotypic genus of orchid, containing only the species now called Aspidogyne mendoncae
