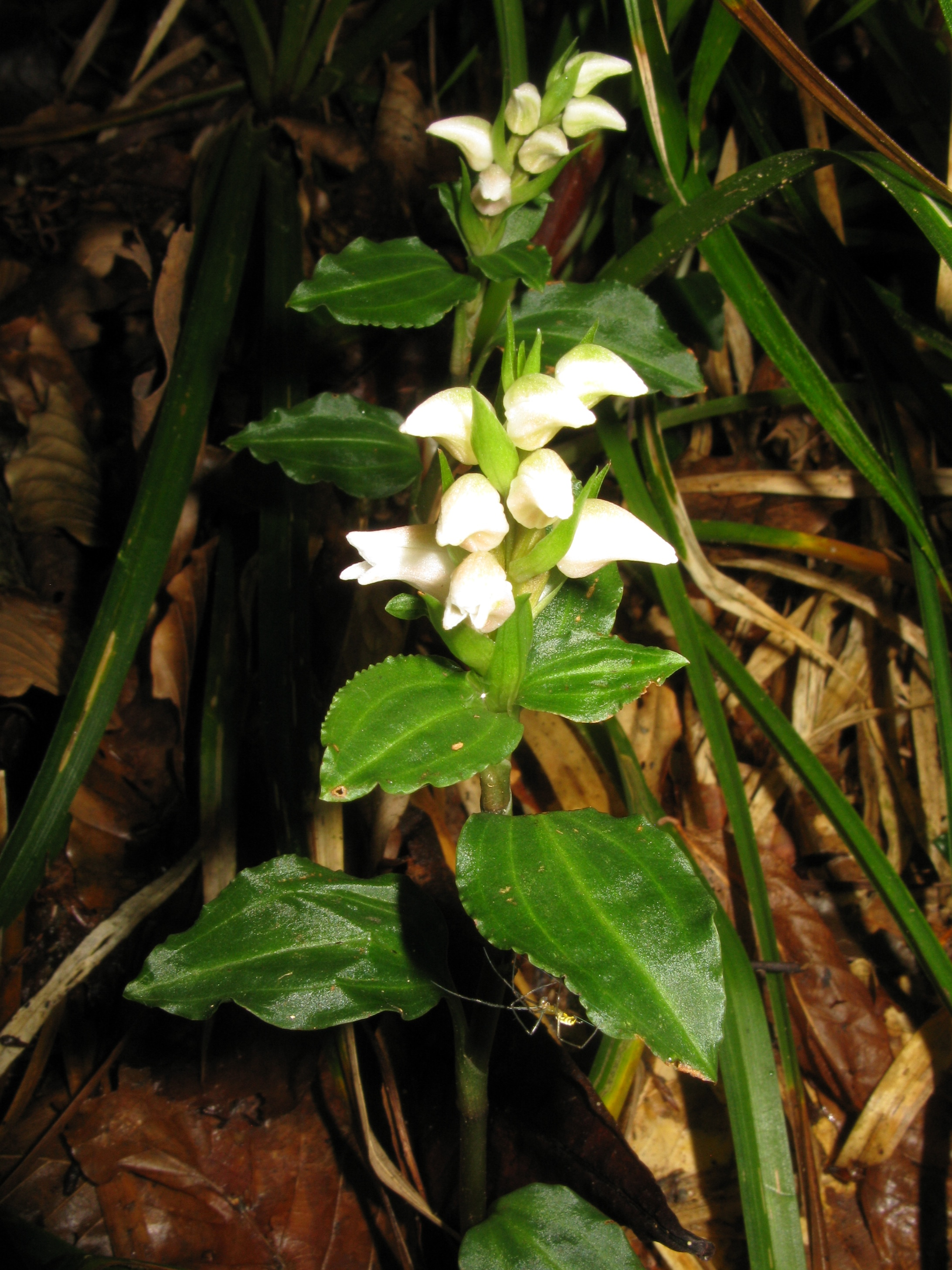
- Goodyera foliosa var. laevis, Niigata pref., Japan.

Scientific classification
- Kingdom: Plantae
- Clade: Tracheophytes
- Clade: Angiosperms
- Clade: Monocots
- Order: Asparagales
- Family: Orchidaceae
- Subfamily: Orchidoideae
- Tribe: Cranichideae
- Subtribe: Goodyerinae; Klotzsch, Getreue Darstell. Gew., 14: pl. 24. (1846)

Genera
- See text

= Goodyerinae =

Goodyerinae Temporal range: Eocene–Present

Subtribe of orchids

Goodyerinae is an orchid subtribe in the tribe Cranichideae.

Certain orchids in this subtribe are referred to as jewel orchids, for instance Ludisia, Goodyera, Dossinia, and Anoectochilus.

== Genera ==
Genera accepted in Chase et al.'s 2015 updated classification of orchids:

- Aenhenrya
- Anoectochilus
- Aspidogyne
- Chamaegastrodia
- Cheirostylis
- Cystorchis
- Danhatchia
- Dossinia
- Erythrodes
- Eurycentrum
- Gonatostylis
- Goodyera
- Halleorchis
- Herpysma
- Hetaeria
- Hylophila
- Kreodanthus
- Kuhlhasseltia
- Lepidogyne
- Ludisia
- Macodes
- Microchilus
- Myrmechis
- Odontochilus
- Orchipedum
- Pachyplectron
- Papuaea
- Platylepis
- Rhamphorhynchus
- Rhomboda
- Schuitemania
- Stephanothelys
- Vrydagzynea
- Zeuxine

Other genera

- Meliorchis † (fossil)

== See also ==
- Taxonomy of the Orchidaceae
