= Pachyplectron =

Scientific classification
- Kingdom: Plantae
- Clade: Tracheophytes
- Clade: Angiosperms
- Clade: Monocots
- Order: Asparagales
- Family: Orchidaceae
- Subfamily: Orchidoideae
- Tribe: Cranichideae
- Subtribe: Goodyerinae
- Genus: Pachyplectron; Schltr.

Genus of orchids

Pachyplectron is a genus of flowering plants from the orchid family, Orchidaceae. The genus contains three species, all endemic to New Caledonia. The genus is related to Odontochilus.

== Species of Pachyplectron ==
- Pachyplectron aphyllum T.Hashim., Ann. Tsukuba Bot. Gard. 16: 7 (1997).
- Pachyplectron arifolium Schltr., Bot. Jahrb. Syst. 39: 52 (1906).
- Pachyplectron neocaledonicum Schltr., Bot. Jahrb. Syst. 39: 52 (1906).

== See also ==
- List of Orchidaceae genera
