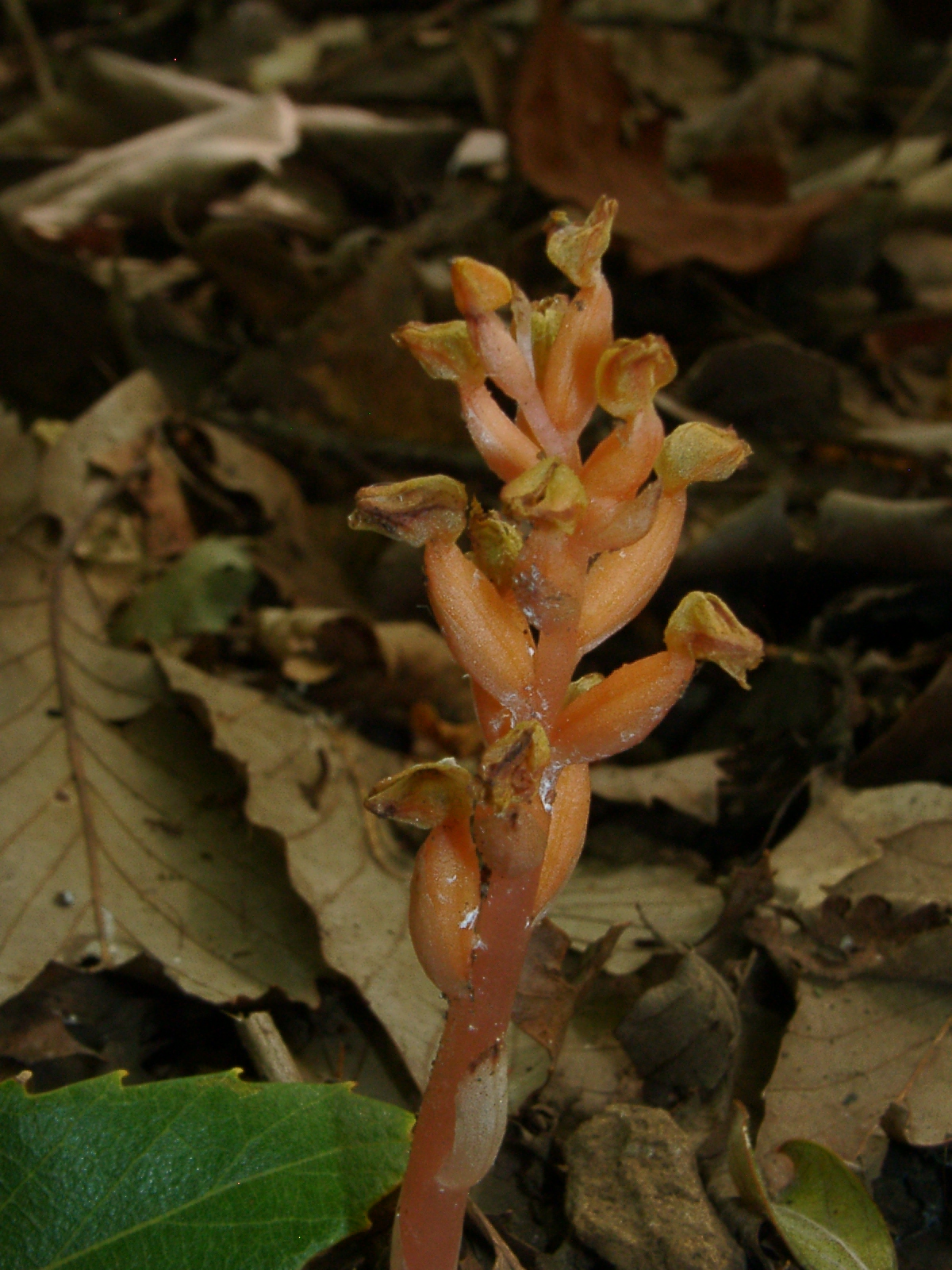
- Chamaegastrodia shikokiana

Scientific classification
- Kingdom: Plantae
- Clade: Tracheophytes
- Clade: Angiosperms
- Clade: Monocots
- Order: Asparagales
- Family: Orchidaceae
- Subfamily: Orchidoideae
- Tribe: Cranichideae
- Subtribe: Goodyerinae
- Genus: Chamaegastrodia; Makino & F.Maek

= Chamaegastrodia =

Genus of flowering plants

Chamaegastrodia is a genus of flowering plants from the orchid family, Orchidaceae. Four species are currently recognized (May 2014), all native to eastern Asia and the Himalayas.

- Chamaegastrodia guidongensis L.Wu, H.Z.Tian & C.Z.Huang
- Chamaegastrodia inverta (W.W.Sm.) Seidenf. - Sichuan, Yunnan
- Chamaegastrodia shikokiana Makino & F.Maek. - Japan, Korea, Assam, Bhutan, Nepal, Sichuan, Tibet
- Chamaegastrodia vaginata (Hook.f.) Seidenf. - Assam, Bhutan, Hubei, Sichuan

== See also ==
- List of Orchidaceae genera
