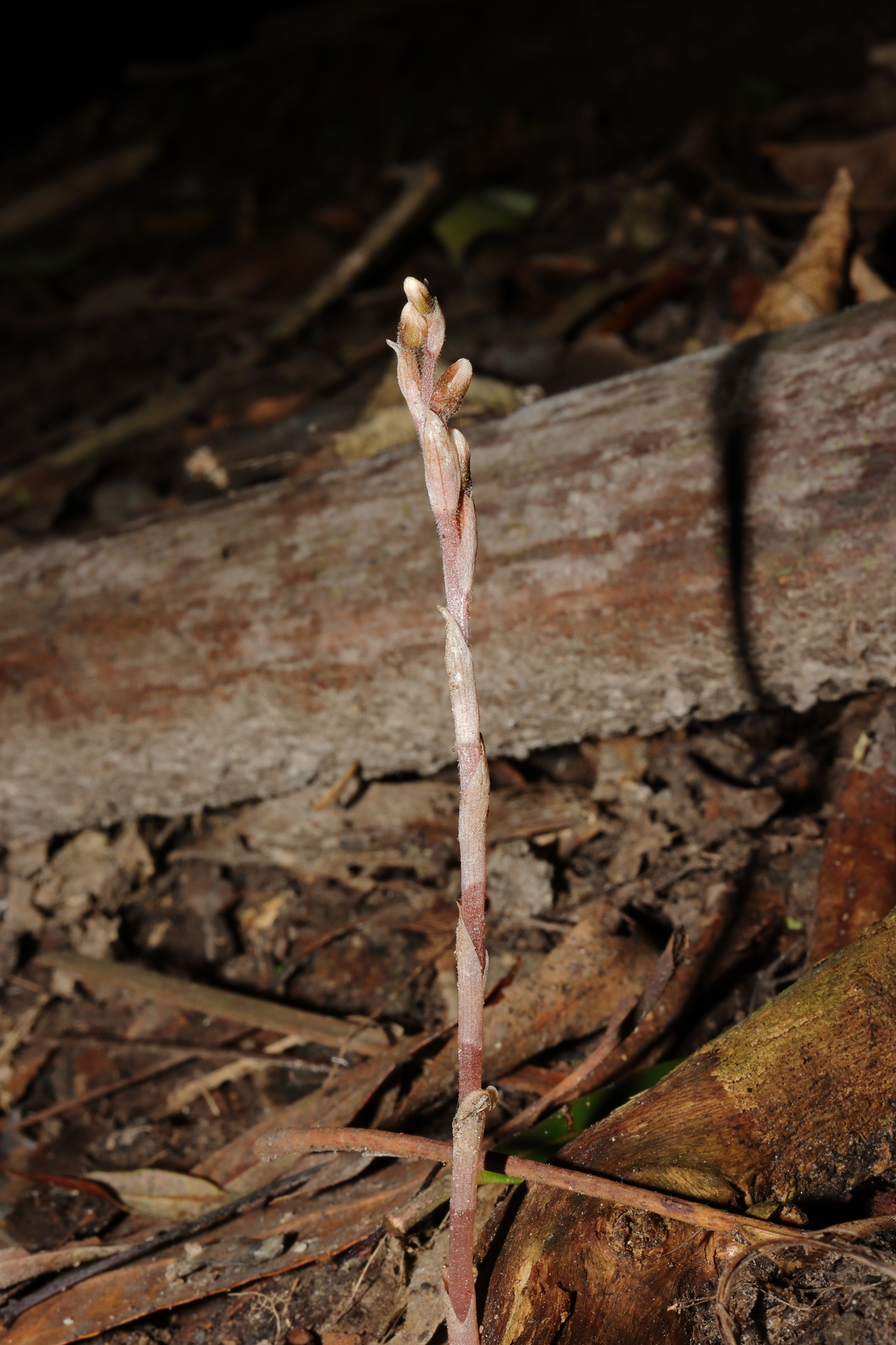
- Danhatchia australis

Scientific classification
- Kingdom: Plantae
- Clade: Tracheophytes
- Clade: Angiosperms
- Clade: Monocots
- Order: Asparagales
- Family: Orchidaceae
- Subfamily: Orchidoideae
- Tribe: Cranichideae
- Subtribe: Goodyerinae
- Genus: Danhatchia; Garay & Christenson

Species
- Danhatchia australis (Hatch) Garay & Christenson; Danhatchia copelandii D.L.Jones & M.A.Clem.; Danhatchia novaehollandiae D.L.Jones & M.A.Clem.

= Danhatchia =

Genus of orchids

Danhatchia is a genus of terrestrial orchids, lacking chlorophyll and obtaining nutrients from fungi in the soil (mycoheterotrophy). Three species are known, Danhatchia australis, native to New Zealand (both main islands) and to New South Wales, and Danhatchia copelandii and Danhatchia novaehollandiae, both native to New South Wales in Australia.
