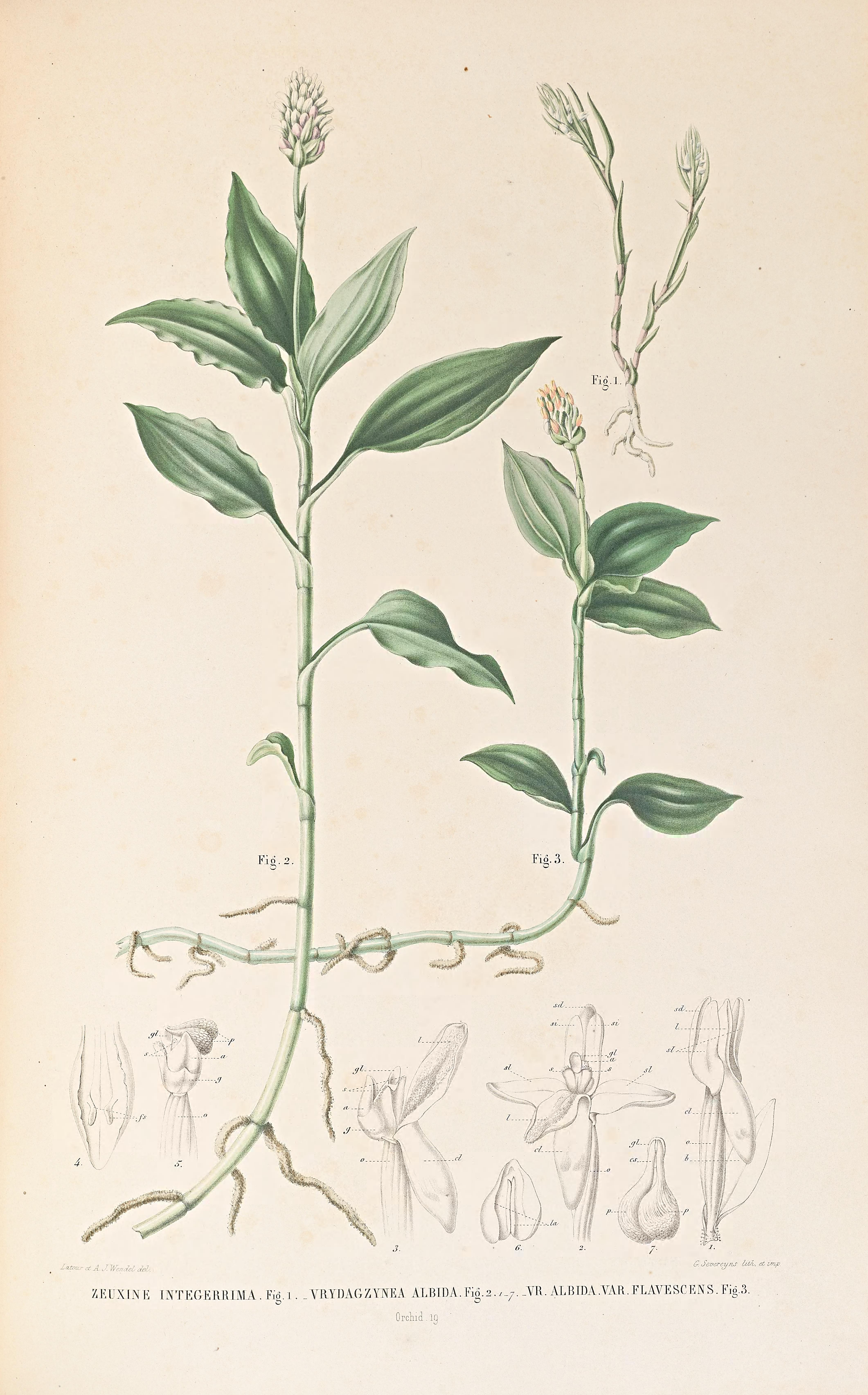
- Drawing of Vrydagzynea albida

Scientific classification
- Kingdom: Plantae
- Clade: Tracheophytes
- Clade: Angiosperms
- Clade: Monocots
- Order: Asparagales
- Family: Orchidaceae
- Subfamily: Orchidoideae
- Tribe: Cranichideae
- Subtribe: Goodyerinae
- Genus: Vrydagzynea; Blume

= Vrydagzynea =

Tonsil orchids

Genus of orchids

Vrydagzynea, commonly called tonsil orchids, is a genus of orchids in the tribe Cranichideae. About forty five species of Vrydagzynea have been formally described. They are native to India, Taiwan, Southeast Asia, Malesia, Melanesia and Polynesia. A single species in Australia is possibly extinct. They have thinly textured, stalked leaves and small, dull-coloured resupinate flowers with the dorsal sepal and petals overlapping to form a hood over the column.

== Description ==
Orchids in the genus Vrydagzynea are terrestrial, perennial, deciduous, sympodial herbs with a fleshy, creeping, above-ground rhizome anchored by wiry roots. The leaves are thinly textured and stalked, arranged in a rosette at the base of the flowering stem or scattered along it. Small, resupinate dull-coloured flowers are crowded along the short flowering stem which usually has protruding bracts. The dorsal sepal and petals overlap, forming a hood over the column. The labellum has a downward pointing spur and two stalked glands that resemble tonsils or testicles. Orchids in this genus are distinguished from those in other similar genera by the labellum glands, labellum spur and by having petals which are shorter than the sepals.

== Taxonomy and naming ==
The genus Vrydagzynea was first formally described in 1858 by Carl Ludwig Blume and the description was published in his book Collection des Orchidées les plus remarquables de l'archipel Indien et du Japon. The name Vrydagzynea honours the Dutch pharmacologist Theodore Daniel Vrydag Zynen, a contemporary of Blume.

=== List of species ===
The following is a list of species of Vrydagzynea recognised by Plants of the World Online as at October 2025:

- Vrydagzynea albida (Blume) Blume - Bangladesh to New Guinea, Indochina, Indonesia, Philippines, Nicobar Islands
- Vrydagzynea albostriata Schltr. in K.M.Schumann & C.A.G.Lauterbach - New Guinea
- Vrydagzynea angustisepala J.J.Sm. - Borneo
- Vrydagzynea argentistriata Carr - Sabah
- Vrydagzynea argyrotaenia Schltr. in K.M.Schumann & C.A.G.Lauterbach - New Guinea, Solomon Islands, Vanuatu
- Vrydagzynea beccarii Schltr. - Sarawak
- Vrydagzynea bicostata Carr - Sabah
- Vrydagzynea bractescens Ridl. - Sumatra, Borneo
- Vrydagzynea brassii Ormerod - New Guinea
- Vrydagzynea buruensis J.J.Sm. - Sulawesi, Maluku
- Vrydagzynea celebica Schltr. - Sulawesi
- Vrydagzynea deliana J.J.Sm. - Sumatra
- Vrydagzynea elata Schltr. - Sabah, Sarawak
- Vrydagzynea elongata Blume - New Guinea, Maluku and Queensland
- Vrydagzynea endertii J.J.Sm. - Borneo
- Vrydagzynea formosana Hayata - Assam, China, Vietnam, Japan
- Vrydagzynea gracilis Blume - Java, Sumatra
- Vrydagzynea grandis Ames & C.Schweinf. in O.Ames - Sabah
- Vrydagzynea guppyi Schltr. - Solomon Islands
- Vrydagzynea kerintjiensis J.J.Sm - Sumatra
- Vrydagzynea lancifolia Ridl. - Thailand, Malaysia, Borneo
- Vrydagzynea micronesiaca Schltr. - Pohnpei
- Vrydagzynea neohibernica Schltr. - Bismarck Archipelago
- Vrydagzynea novaguineensis J.J.Sm. - New Guinea
- Vrydagzynea nuda Blume - Hainan, Hong Kong, Taiwan, Vietnam, Borneo, Java
- Vrydagzynea obliqua Schltr. - Sulawesi
- Vrydagzynea paludosa J.J.Sm. - Queensland, New Guinea, Solomon Islands
- Vrydagzynea pauciflora J.J.Sm. - Borneo
- Vrydagzynea purpurea Blume - Java
- Vrydagzynea salomonensis Schltr. in K.M.Schumann & C.A.G.Lauterbach - Vanuatu, Solomon Islands
- Vrydagzynea samoana Schltr - Vanuatu, Fiji, Samoa
- Vrydagzynea schumanniana Kraenzl. in K.M.Schumann & C.A.G.Lauterbach - New Guinea
- Vrydagzynea semicordata J.J.Sm. - Borneo
- Vrydagzynea sessilifolia Ormerod - New Guinea
- Vrydagzynea tilungensis J.J.Sm. - Borneo
- Vrydagzynea triangularis Ormerod & J.J.Wood - Sabah
- Vrydagzynea tristriata Ridl. - Thailand, Malaysia, Borneo
- Vrydagzynea truncicola Schltr. - New Guinea
- Vrydagzynea uncinata Blume - Java
- Vrydagzynea viridiflora Hook.f.
- Vrydagzynea vitiensis Rchb.f - Vanuatu, Fiji, Samoa, Tonga
- Vrydagzynea vrydagzynoides (Ames) Ormerod - Leyte
- Vrydagzynea weberi Ames - Philippines

== See also ==
- List of Orchidaceae genera
