= Odontochilus clarkei =

Scientific classification
- Kingdom: Plantae
- Clade: Tracheophytes
- Clade: Angiosperms
- Clade: Monocots
- Order: Asparagales
- Family: Orchidaceae
- Subfamily: Orchidoideae
- Tribe: Cranichideae
- Genus: Odontochilus
- Species: O. clarkei

Binomial name
- Odontochilus clarkei Hook. f.

Species of plant

Odontochilus clarkei is a species of orchid growing from the Himalayas to Myanmar.

== Description ==
Odontochilus clarkei is a terrestrial species of orchid about 20–30 centimetres (7.9–11.8 in) tall. It has a rhizome, which is 3–18 centimetres (1.2–7.1 in) long and 5 millimetres (0.20 in) thick. The fleshy roots grow up to one centimetre long, and have small hairs. The erect stem is five to ten centimetres in length and four millimetres thick, with a decumbent base and no branches.

The green, three-veined leaves are 2–5 by 2–9 centimetres (0.79 in–1.97 in × 0.79 in–3.54 in), and are clustered near the top of the stem. The petiole is one to two centimeters long, and is sheathed at the base. The lamina is elliptic to ovate-lanceolate, being 2–7 by 1–4 centimetres (0.79 in–2.76 in × 0.39 in–1.57 in). The leaves have acute apexes and obtuse bases.

The inflorescences have terminal racemes, which have many pubescent flowers which are gathered moderately densely. The peduncle is 6–9 centimetres (2–4 in), and has up to two lanceolate sheathing bracts, which are each 0.7–1.3 centimetres (0.3–0.5 in) with an acuminate at the apex.

The floral bracts are 8–17 by 3–6 millimetres (0.31 in–0.67 in × 0.12 in–0.24 in), and taper to a sharp point. They are pink and longer than the ovary, and have one vein. The flowers are 1.5 to 2.5 centimetres (0.6 to 1.0 in) long, and are inverted. The free sepals are greenish red, and occasionally have dark brown or green stripes. They are 7 by 4 millimetres (0.3 in × 0.2 in), with ovate dorsal sepals with more oval lateral counterparts.
