= Orchipedidae =

Scientific classification
- Kingdom: Animalia
- Phylum: Platyhelminthes
- Class: Trematoda
- Order: Plagiorchiida
- Suborder: Xiphidiata
- Superfamily: Gorgoderoidea
- Family: Orchipedidae; Skrjabin, 1924

Genera
- Achillurbania; Mammorchipedum; Orchipedum

Synonyms
- Achillurbaniidae Dollfus, 1939

Family of flukes

Orchipedidae is a family of trematodes in the suborder Xiphidiata.
