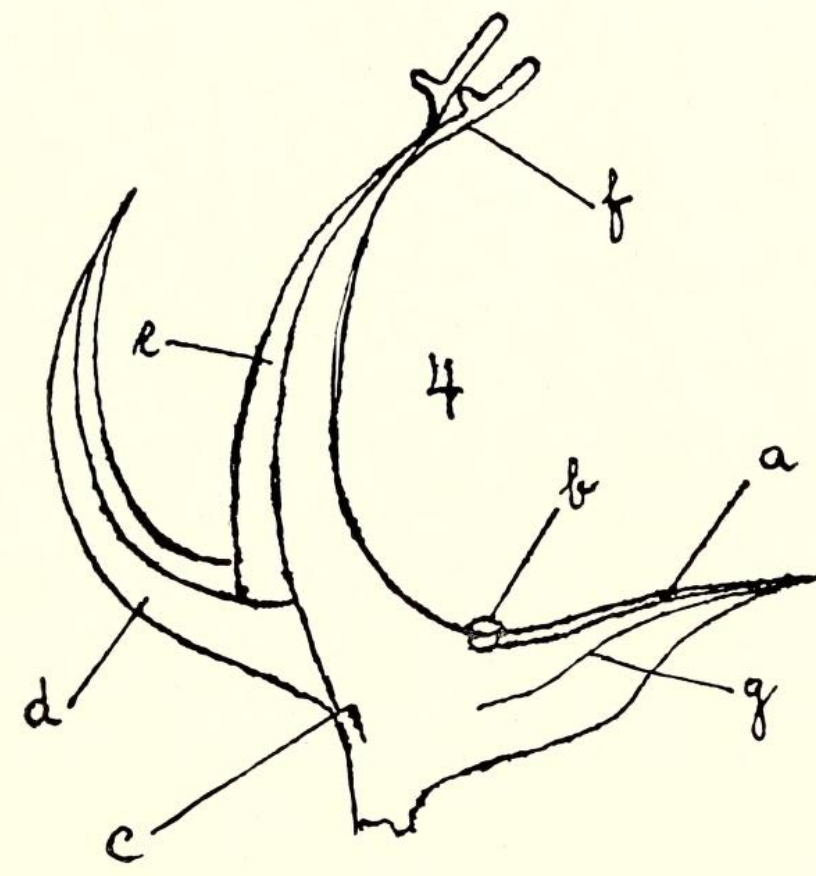
- Illustration of the flower from the protologue of basionym Odontochilus rotundifolius.

Scientific classification
- Kingdom: Plantae
- Clade: Tracheophytes
- Clade: Angiosperms
- Clade: Monocots
- Order: Asparagales
- Family: Orchidaceae
- Subfamily: Orchidoideae
- Tribe: Cranichideae
- Subtribe: Goodyerinae
- Genus: Aenhenrya; Gopalan
- Species: A. rotundifolia

Binomial name
- Aenhenrya rotundifolia (Blatt.) C.S.Kumar & F.N.Rasm.

Synonyms
- Odontochilus rotundifolius Blatt.; Anoectochilus rotundifolius (Blatt.) N.P.Balakr.; Aenhenrya agastyamalayana Gopalan

= Aenhenrya =

Genus of flowering plants

Aenhenrya is a monotypic genus of terrestrial orchids that spread by means of underground rhizomes. Only one species is known, Aenhenrya rotundifolia, a very rare plant and endemic to southern India (within Kerala and Tamil Nadu).

The genus name of Aenhenrya is in honour of Ambrose Nathaniel Henry (b. 1936), Indian botanist with a focus on the flora of Southern India. The Latin specific epithet of rotundifolia is Latin for round-leaved. It was first described and published in J. Bombay Nat. Hist. Soc. Vol.90 on page 270 (1993, published in 1994). Then the species was first published in Novon Vol.7 on page 81 in 1997.

The genus is recognized by the United States Department of Agriculture and the Agricultural Research Service, but they do not list any known species.

== Others sources ==
- Pridgeon, A. M. et al., eds. 2003. Genera Orchidacearum. 3:66-68. (Oxford University Press)
