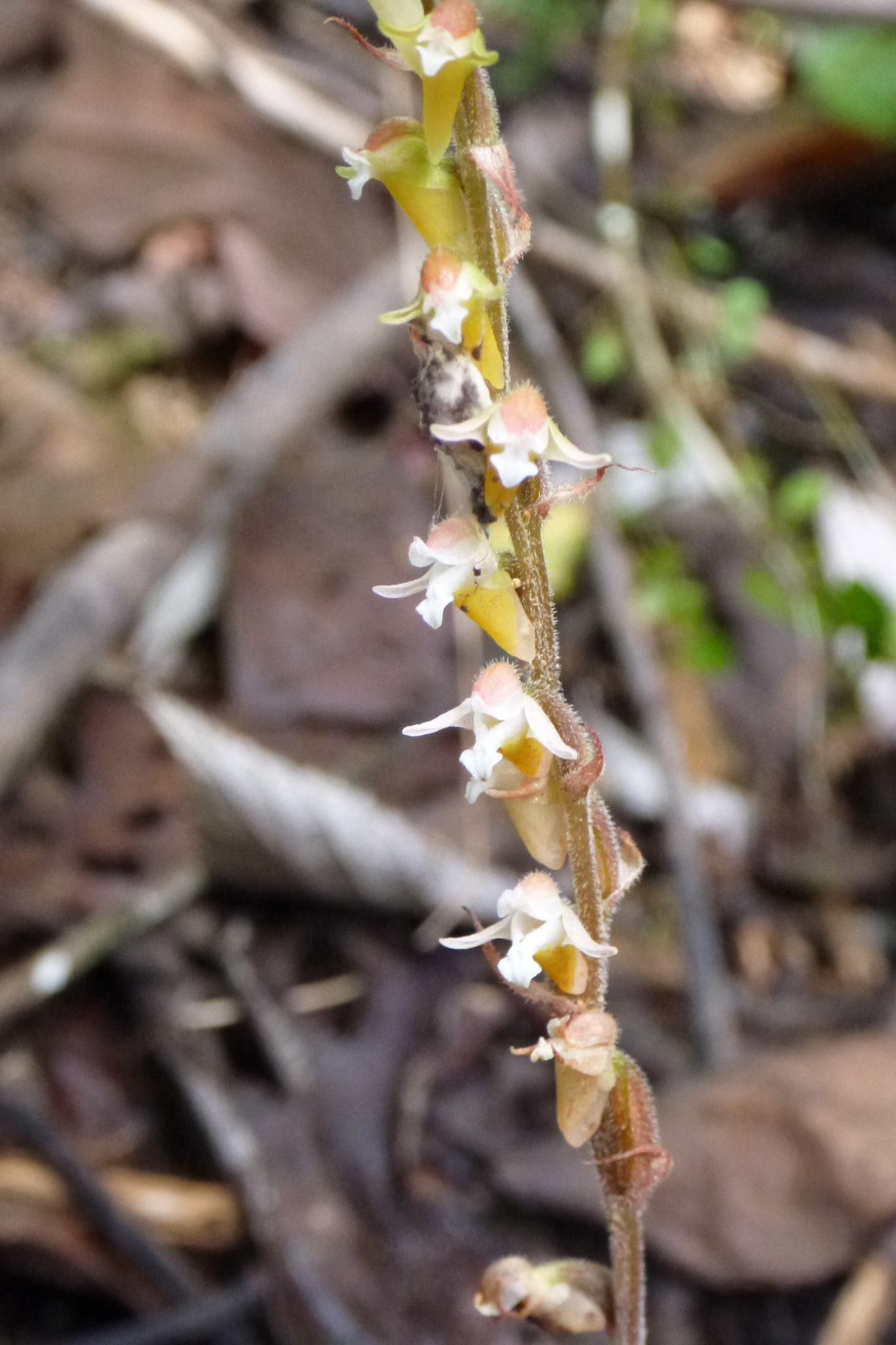
- Eurycentrum obscurum Image from iNaturalist user: coenobita

Scientific classification
- Kingdom: Plantae
- Clade: Tracheophytes
- Clade: Angiosperms
- Clade: Monocots
- Order: Asparagales
- Family: Orchidaceae
- Subfamily: Orchidoideae
- Tribe: Cranichideae
- Subtribe: Goodyerinae
- Genus: Eurycentrum; Schltr. in K.M.Schumann & C.A.G.Lauterbach

= Eurycentrum =

Genus of orchids

Eurycentrum is a genus of flowering plants from the orchid family, Orchidaceae. It contains 7 known species, native to New Guinea and to certain islands of the Pacific.

1. Eurycentrum amblyoceras Schltr. - New Guinea
2. Eurycentrum atroviride J.J.Sm. - New Guinea
3. Eurycentrum fragrans Schltr. - New Guinea
4. Eurycentrum goodyeroides Ridl. - New Guinea
5. Eurycentrum monticola Schltr. - New Guinea
6. Eurycentrum obscurum (Blume) Schltr. in K.M.Schumann & C.A.G.Lauterbach - New Guinea
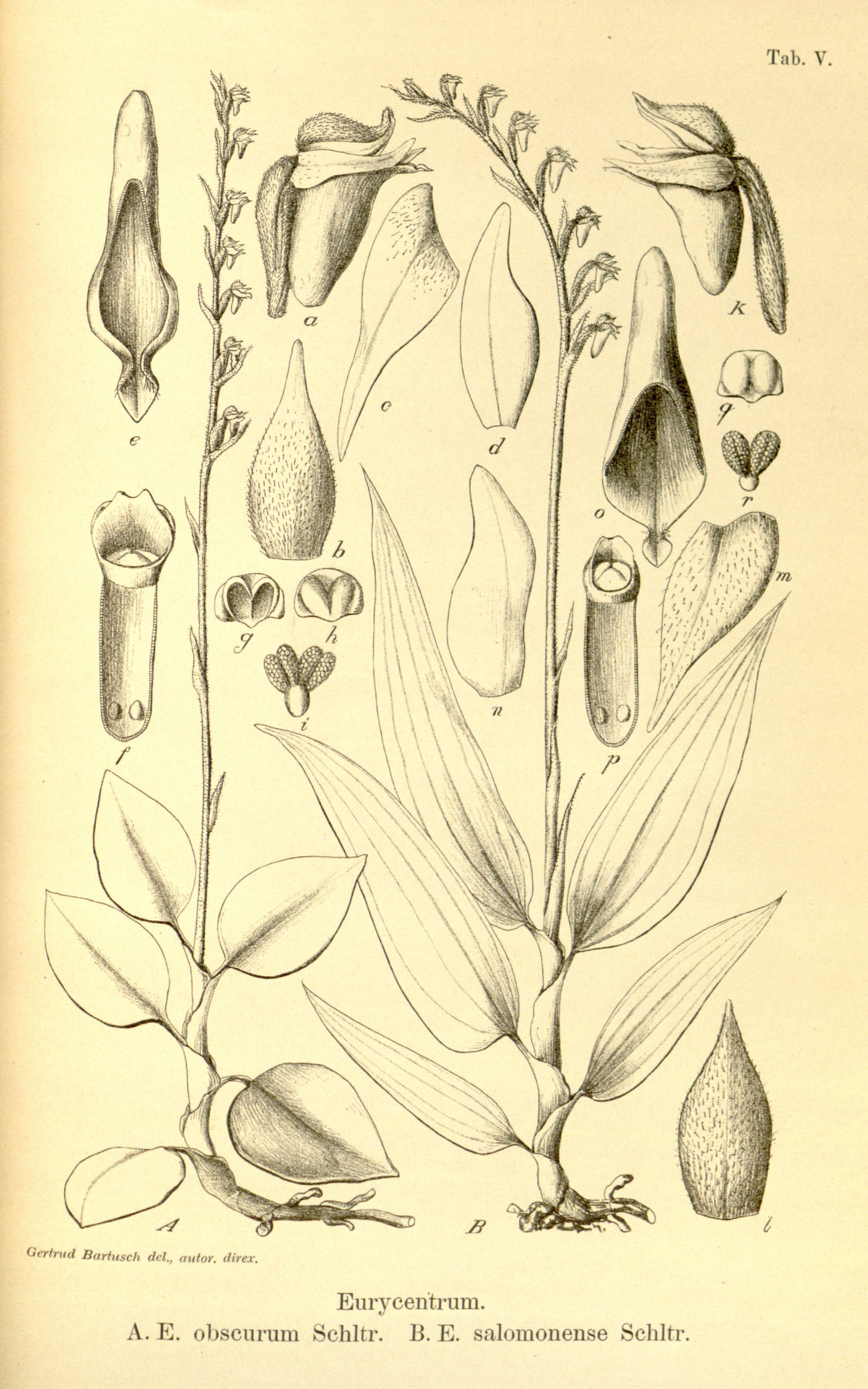
7. Karl Moritz Schumann & Karl Lauterbach - Nachträge zur Flora der deutschen Schutzgebiete - Eurycentrum obscurum - Eurycentrum salomonense - plate 5 (1905)
  Eurycentrum salomonense Schltr. in K.M.Schumann & C.A.G.Lauterbach - Solomons, Vanuatu, Santa Cruz Islands

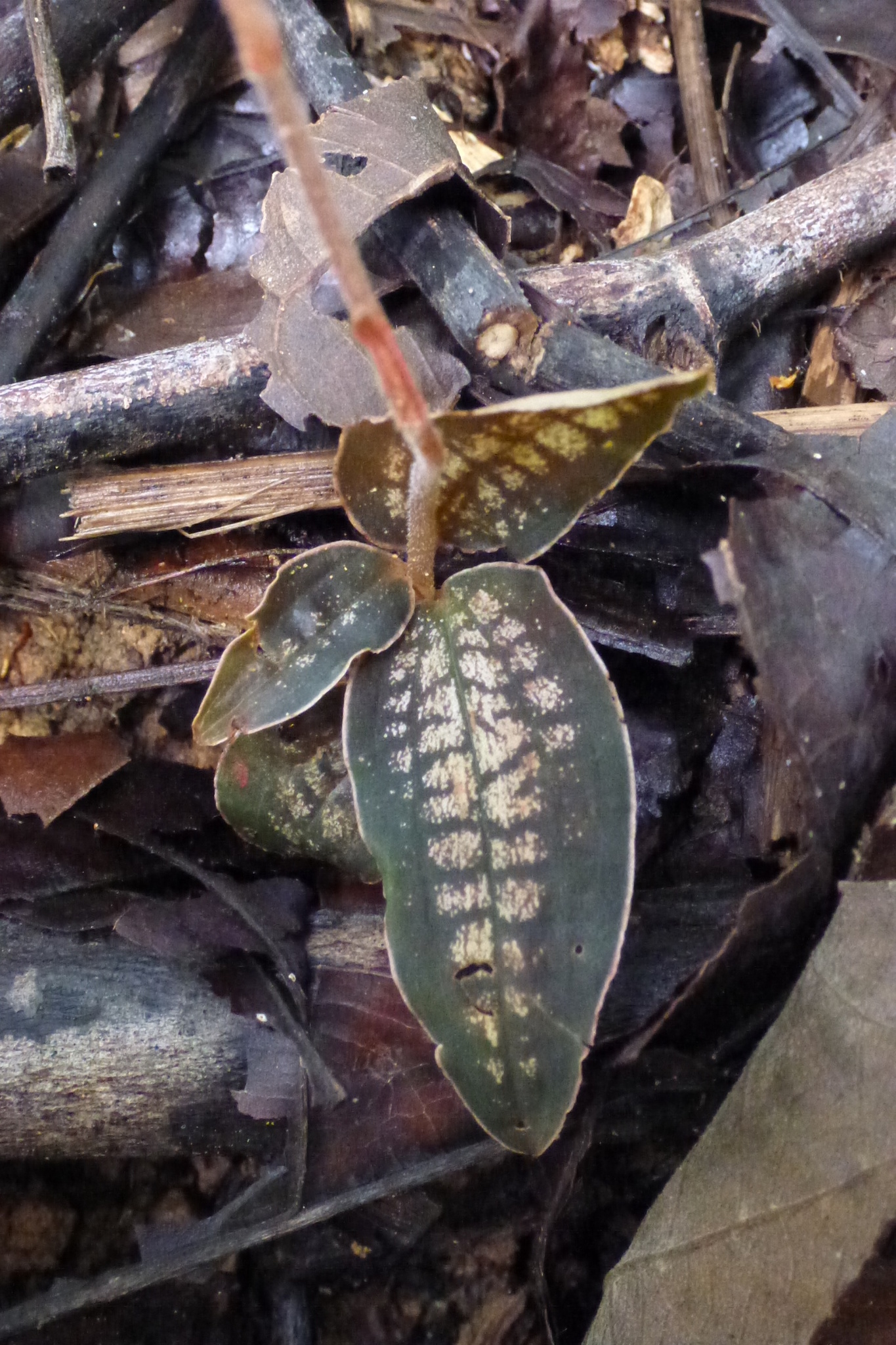
Image of Eurycentrum obscurum from iNaturalist user: coenobita

== See also ==
- List of Orchidaceae genera
