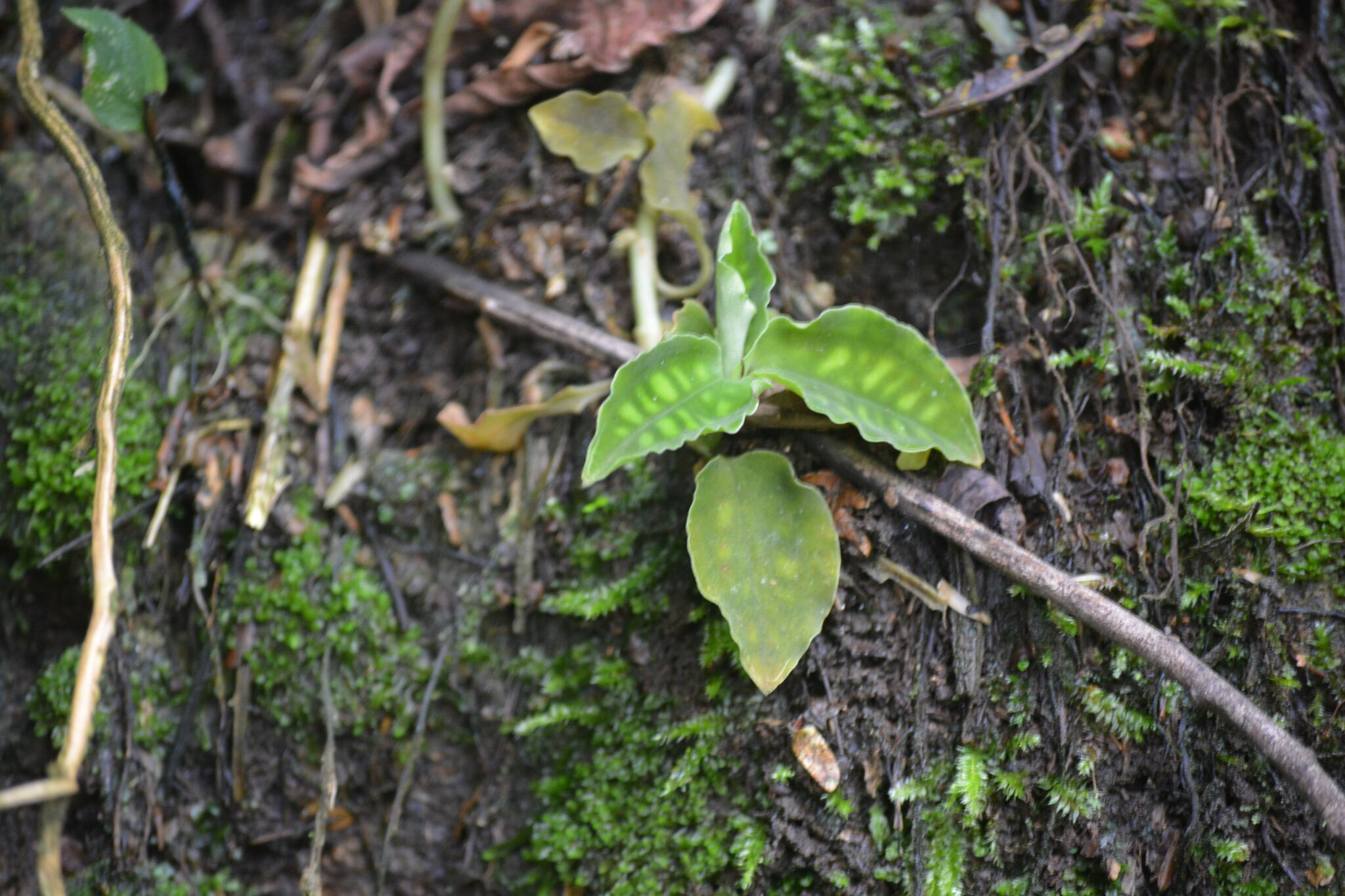
- In Halimun Salak National Park

Conservation status
- CITES Appendix II

Scientific classification
- Kingdom: Plantae
- Clade: Tracheophytes
- Clade: Angiosperms
- Clade: Monocots
- Order: Asparagales
- Family: Orchidaceae
- Subfamily: Orchidoideae
- Tribe: Cranichideae
- Genus: Cystorchis
- Species: C. variegata

Binomial name
- Cystorchis variegata Blume

Synonyms
- Hetaeria variegata (Blume) Miq.

= Cystorchis variegata =

Species of orchid

Cystorchis variegata is a species of terrestrial orchid native to Malesia and Vanuatu. It was described by Carl Ludwig Blume in 1858.

== Distribution and habitat ==
Cystorchis variegata can be found in Borneo, Java, Sumatra, Peninsular Malaysia, and Vanuatu. In Java it is known to grow in damp, shady forests at altitudes of 600–1,100 m (2,000–3,600 ft).

== Description ==
Cystorchis variegata is a small plant, growing 15–25 cm (5.9–9.8 in) tall. Each plant bears around six leaves, elliptic in shape with wavy edges, measuring up to 7 cm (2.8 in) long and 2.8 cm (1.1 in) wide. The leaves are mostly dark green in colour, with lighter green patches between the veins, and are borne on 2 cm (0.79 in) long petioles. The peduncle is covered with short, fine hairs and measures 10–15 cm (3.9–5.9 in) long, ending in a 3 cm (1.2 in) long rachis that bears 7–12 flowers. Each tubular flower measures approximately 6 mm (0.24 in) long. The sepals are yellowish at the base, pinkish or reddish brown towards the middle, and cream coloured at the tip, with the lateral sepals being concave near the base of the flower to enclose the base of the spur. The petals are white and lance-shaped. The labellum is white and orange, fleshy, with the margins folded upwards to form a tube.
