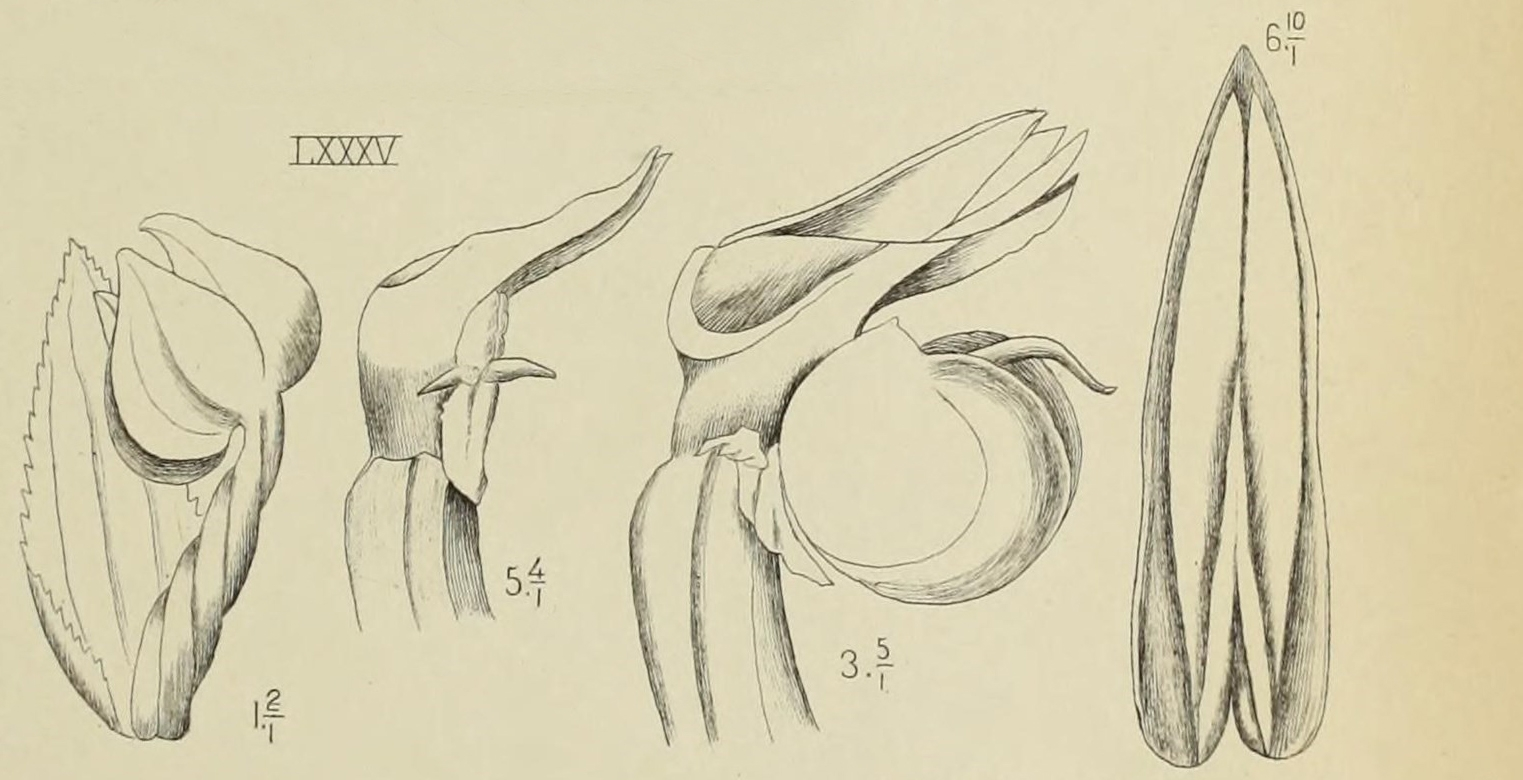
- Hylophila lanceolata

Scientific classification
- Kingdom: Plantae
- Clade: Tracheophytes
- Clade: Angiosperms
- Clade: Monocots
- Order: Asparagales
- Family: Orchidaceae
- Subfamily: Orchidoideae
- Tribe: Cranichideae
- Subtribe: Goodyerinae
- Genus: Hylophila; Lindl.

Synonyms
- Dicerostylis Blume

= Hylophila =

Genus of orchids

Hylophila is a genus of flowering plants from the orchid family, Orchidaceae, native to Southeast Asia, New Guinea, and Melanesia. As of December 2025, Plants of the World Online accepts the following 6 species:

- Hylophila cheangii Holttum
- Hylophila lanceolata (Blume) Miq.
- Hylophila mollis Lindl.
- Hylophila nipponica (Fukuy.) T.P.Lin
- Hylophila rubra Ames
- Hylophila vietnamensis Aver. & V.C.Nguyen

== See also ==
- List of Orchidaceae genera
