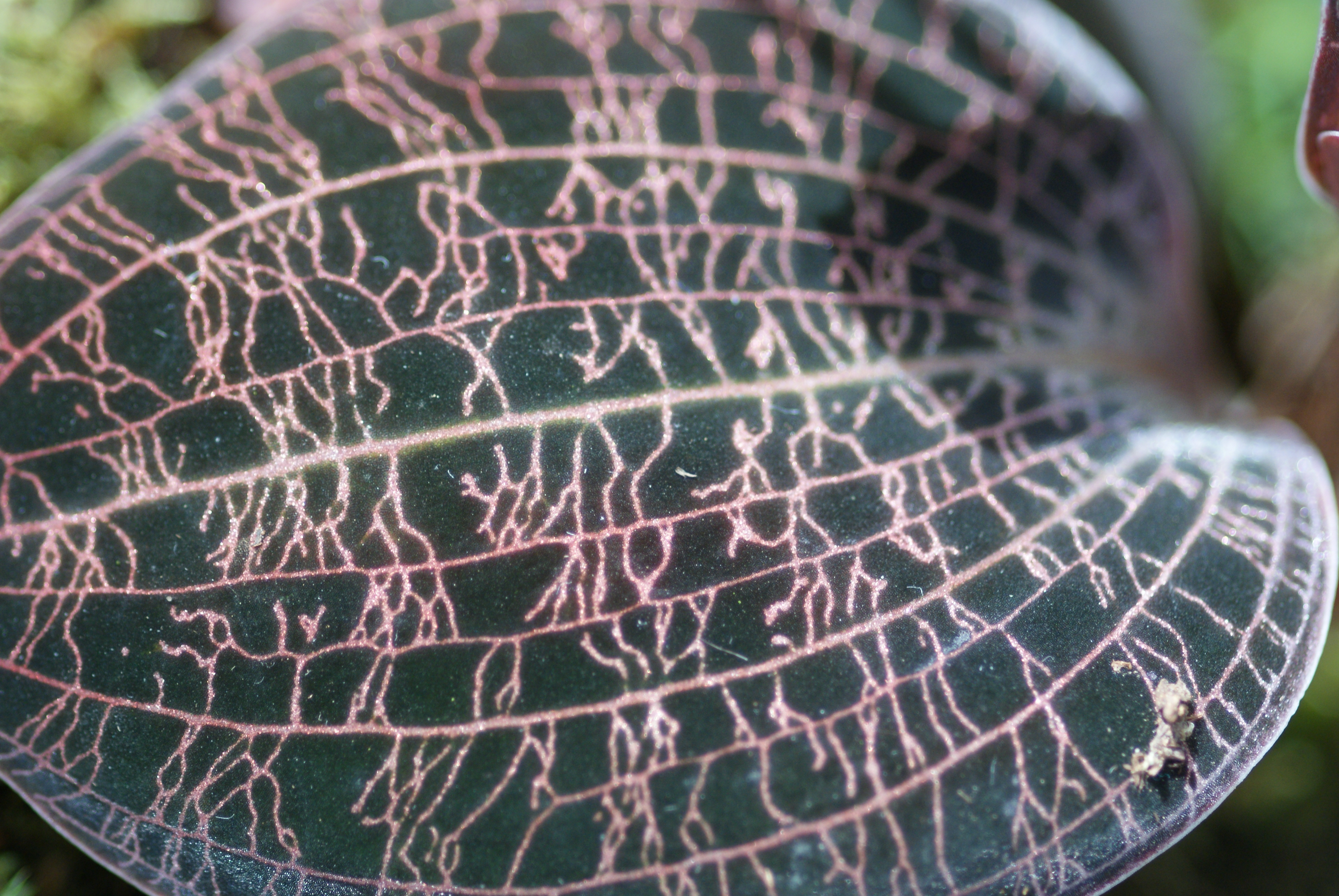

Conservation status
- CITES Appendix II

Scientific classification
- Kingdom: Plantae
- Clade: Tracheophytes
- Clade: Angiosperms
- Clade: Monocots
- Order: Asparagales
- Family: Orchidaceae
- Subfamily: Orchidoideae
- Tribe: Cranichideae
- Subtribe: Goodyerinae
- Genus: Dossinia; C.Morren
- Species: D. marmorata

Binomial name
- Dossinia marmorata C.Morren

Synonyms
- Cheirostylis marmorata (C.Morren) Lindl. ex Lem.; Macodes marmorata (C.Morren) Rchb.f.; Ludisia argyroneura Miq.; Anoectochilus lowii var. virescens B.S.Williams

= Dossinia =

Genus of orchids

Dossinia is a monotypic genus of orchids containing only the species Dossinia marmorata. It is endemic to Borneo.

== See also ==
- List of Orchidaceae genera
