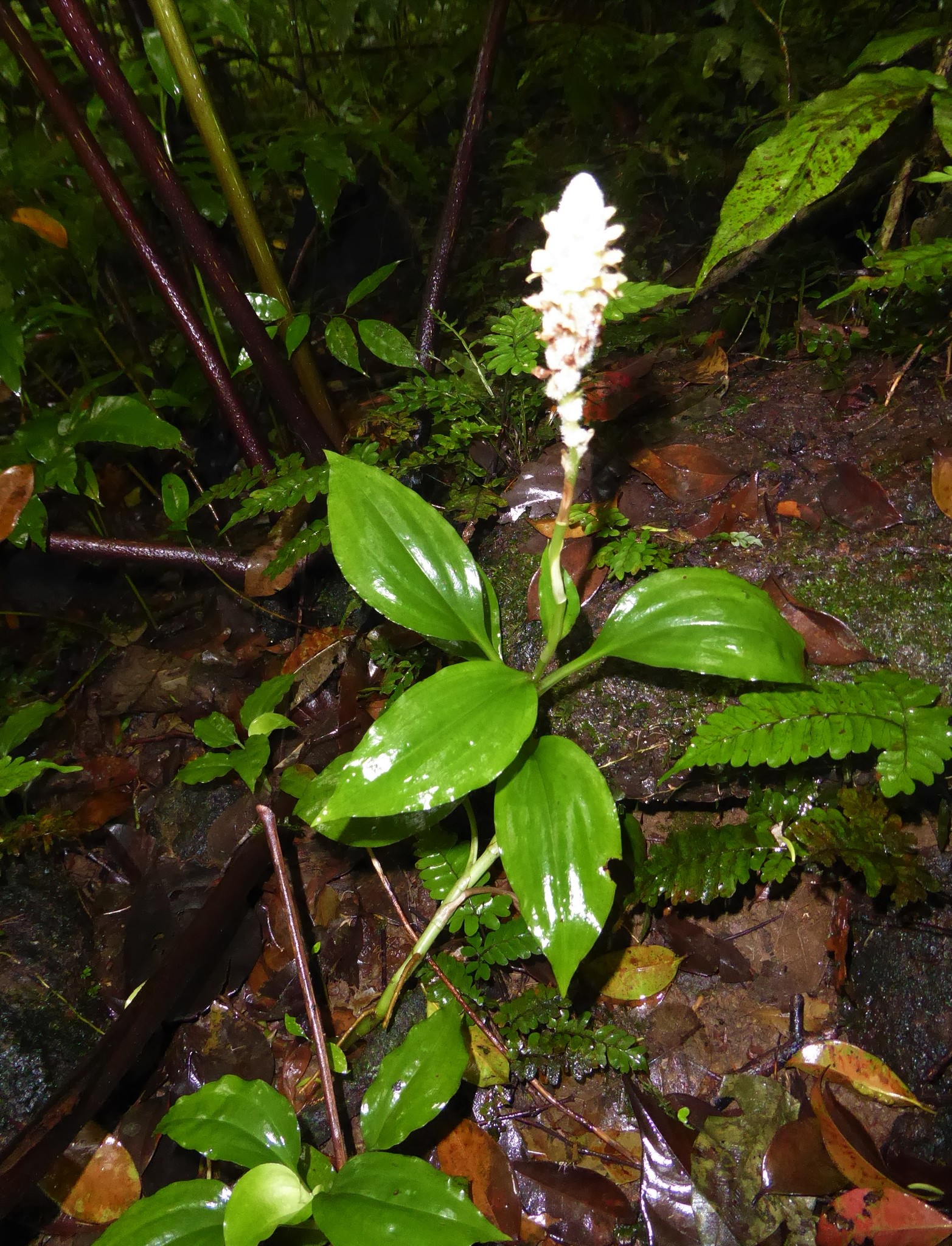
- Platylepis glandulosa in São Tomé and Príncipe

Scientific classification
- Kingdom: Plantae
- Clade: Tracheophytes
- Clade: Angiosperms
- Clade: Monocots
- Order: Asparagales
- Family: Orchidaceae
- Subfamily: Orchidoideae
- Tribe: Cranichideae
- Subtribe: Goodyerinae
- Genus: Platylepis; A.Rich.

Synonyms
- Coralliokyphos H.Fleischm. & Rech.; Diplogastra Welw. ex Rchb.f.; Erporkis Thouars; Moerenhoutia Blume; Notiophrys Lindl.

= Platylepis =

Genus of flowering plants

Platylepis is a genus of flowering plants from the orchid family, Orchidaceae. It is widespread across sub-Saharan Africa and also on various islands of the Pacific and Indian Oceans.

- Platylepis bigibbosa H.Perrier - Madagascar
- Platylepis bombus J.J.Sm. - Seram
- Platylepis commelynae (Lindl.) Rchb.f. - Society Islands
- Platylepis constricta (J.J.Sm.) J.J.Sm. - New Guinea
- Platylepis densiflora Rolfe - Réunion
- Platylepis geluana (Schltr.) Schuit. & de Vogel - New Guinea
- Platylepis glandulosa (Lindl.) Rchb.f. - widespread across tropical and southern Africa
- Platylepis grandiflora (Schltr.) Ormerod - New Caledonia, Vanuatu, Futuna
- Platylepis heteromorpha Rchb.f. - Samoa
- Platylepis intricata Schuit. & de Vogel - Papua New Guinea
- Platylepis lamellata Schltr. - New Guinea
- Platylepis margaritifera Schltr. - Madagascar
- Platylepis occulta (Thouars) Rchb.f. - Madagascar, Réunion, Mauritius, Seychelles
- Platylepis polyadenia Rchb.f. - Madagascar, Comoros
- Platylepis rufa (Frapp.) Schltr. - Réunion
- Platylepis tidorensis J.J.Sm. - Maluku
- Platylepis viscosa (Rchb.f.) Schltr. - Réunion
- Platylepis xerostele Ormerod - Cameroon
- Platylepis zeuxinoides Schltr. - New Guinea

== See also ==
- List of Orchidaceae genera
