= Papuaea =

Scientific classification
- Kingdom: Plantae
- Clade: Tracheophytes
- Clade: Angiosperms
- Clade: Monocots
- Order: Asparagales
- Family: Orchidaceae
- Subfamily: Orchidoideae
- Tribe: Cranichideae
- Subtribe: Goodyerinae
- Genus: Papuaea; Schltr.
- Species: P. reticulata

Binomial name
- Papuaea reticulata Schltr.

Genus of orchids

Papuaea is a monotypic genus of flowering plants from the orchid family, Orchidaceae. The sole species is Papuaea reticulata.

== See also ==
- List of Orchidaceae genera
