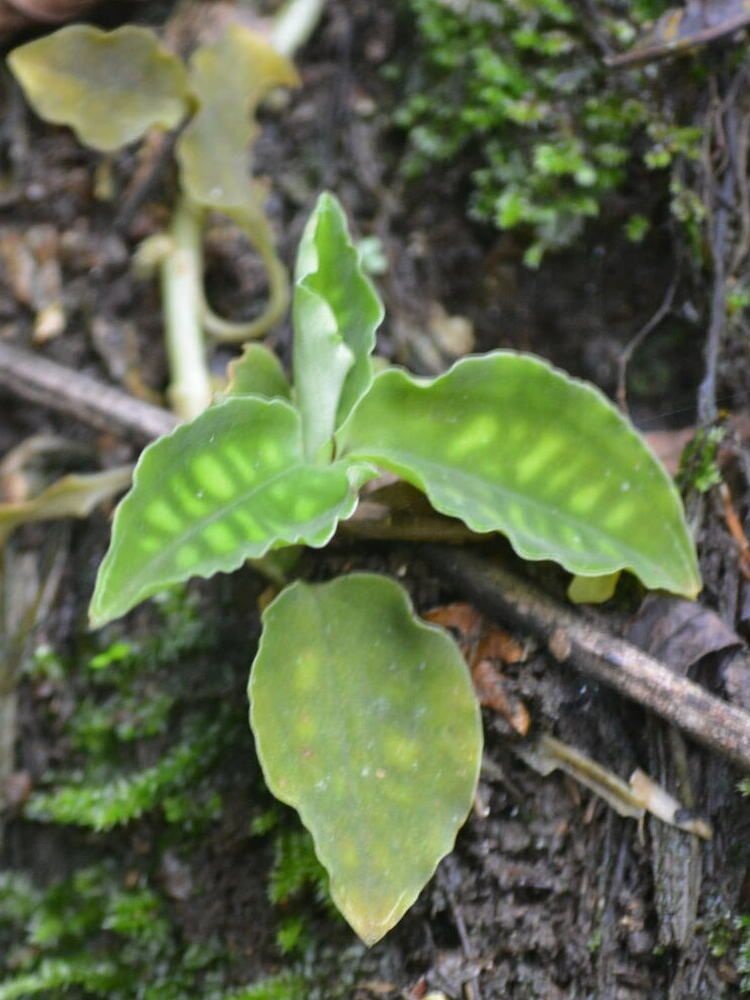
- Cystorchis variegata

Scientific classification
- Kingdom: Plantae
- Clade: Tracheophytes
- Clade: Angiosperms
- Clade: Monocots
- Order: Asparagales
- Family: Orchidaceae
- Subfamily: Orchidoideae
- Tribe: Cranichideae
- Subtribe: Goodyerinae
- Genus: Cystorchis; Blume

= Cystorchis =

Genus of orchids

Cystorchis is a genus of flowering plants from the orchid family, Orchidaceae. It has 20 currently accepted species (September 2026), native to New Guinea, Southeast Asia, and the islands of the western Pacific.

- Cystorchis aberrans J.J.Sm.
- Cystorchis aphylla Ridl.
- Cystorchis appendiculata J.J.Sm.
- Cystorchis celebica Schltr.
- Cystorchis dentifera Schltr.
- Cystorchis gracilis (Hook.f.) Holttum
- Cystorchis javanica (Blume) Blume
- Cystorchis luzonensis Ames
- Cystorchis macrophysa Schltr.
- Cystorchis marginata Blume
- Cystorchis ogurae (Tuyama) Ormerod & P.J.Cribb
- Cystorchis orphnophilla Schltr.
- Cystorchis peliocaulos Schltr.
- Cystorchis ranaiensis J.J.Sm.
- Cystorchis saccosepala J.J.Sm.
- Cystorchis salmoneus J.J.Wood
- Cystorchis saprophytica J.J.Sm.
- Cystorchis stenoglossa Schltr.
- Cystorchis variegata Blume
- Cystorchis versteegii J.J.Sm.

== See also ==
- List of Orchidaceae genera
