= Stephanothelys =

Scientific classification
- Kingdom: Plantae
- Clade: Tracheophytes
- Clade: Angiosperms
- Clade: Monocots
- Order: Asparagales
- Family: Orchidaceae
- Subfamily: Orchidoideae
- Tribe: Cranichideae
- Subtribe: Goodyerinae
- Genus: Stephanothelys; Garay

Genus of flowering plants

Stephanothelys is a genus of flowering plants from the orchid family, Orchidaceae, endemic to South America.

Species accepted as of June 2014:

- Stephanothelys colombiana Garay - Colombia
- Stephanothelys rariflora Garay - Bolivia
- Stephanothelys siberiana Ormerod - Bolivia
- Stephanothelys sororia Garay - Peru
- Stephanothelys xystophylloides (Garay) Garay - Colombia, Ecuador

== See also ==
- List of Orchidaceae genera
