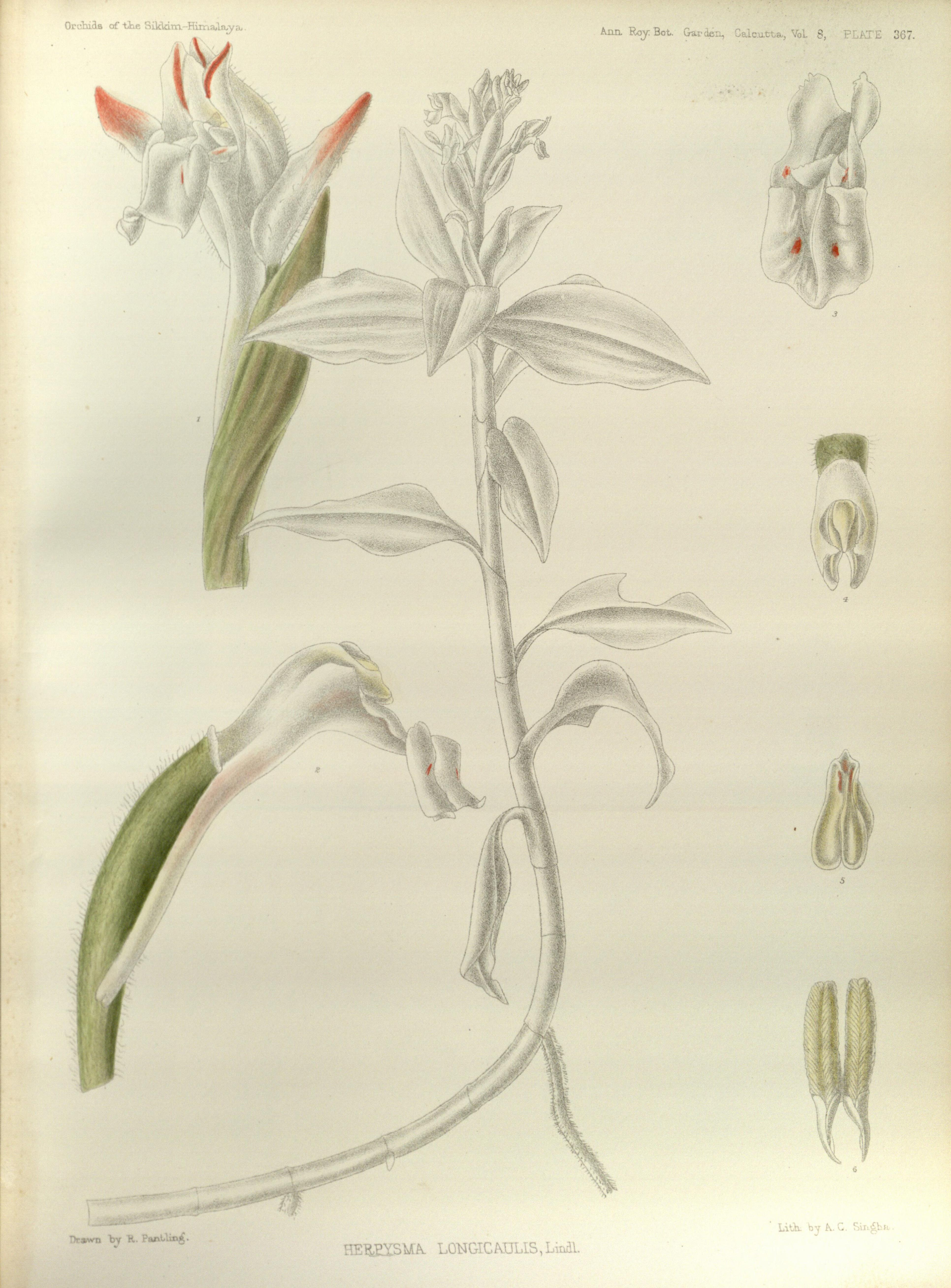
- Herpysma longicaulis Plate 367 in: G. King & R. Pantling; The Orchids of the Sikkim-Himalaya (1898)

Scientific classification
- Kingdom: Plantae
- Clade: Tracheophytes
- Clade: Angiosperms
- Clade: Monocots
- Order: Asparagales
- Family: Orchidaceae
- Subfamily: Orchidoideae
- Tribe: Cranichideae
- Subtribe: Goodyerinae
- Genus: Herpysma; Lindl.
- Species: H. longicaulis

Binomial name
- Herpysma longicaulis Lindl.

Synonyms
- Physurus bracteatus Blume; Erythrodes bracteata (Blume) Schltr. in K.M.Schumann & C.A.G.Lauterbach; Herpysma sumatrana Carr; Herpysma bracteata (Blume) J.J.Sm.

= Herpysma =

Genus of orchids

Herpysma is a genus of flowering plants from the orchid family, Orchidaceae. It contains only one known species, Herpysma longicaulis, native to Southeast Asia (Yunnan, Bhutan, Assam, Sumatra, Myanmar, Nepal, Bhutan, Thailand, Vietnam).

== See also ==
- List of Orchidaceae genera
