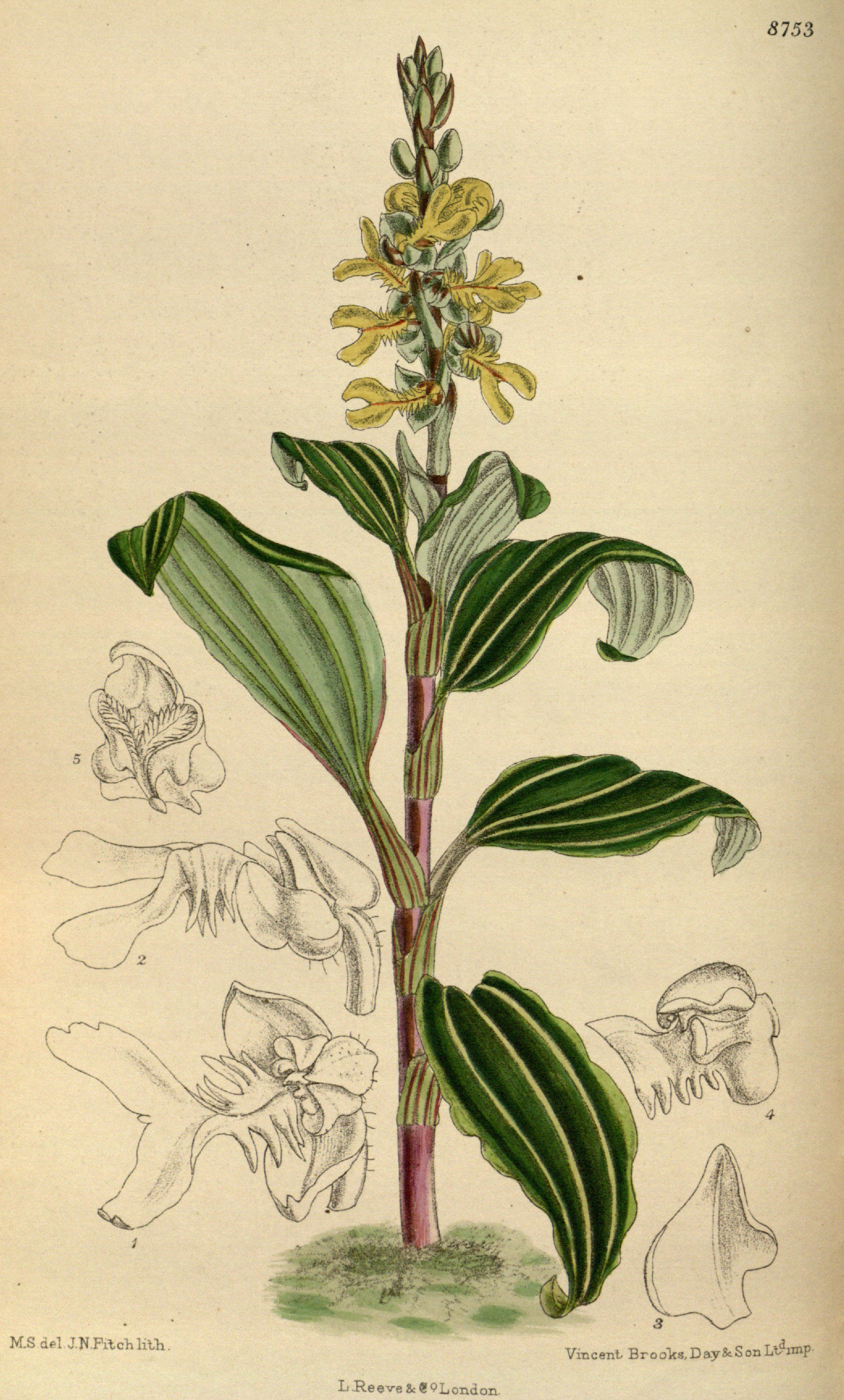
- Odontochilus lanceolatus 1918 illustration

Scientific classification
- Kingdom: Plantae
- Clade: Tracheophytes
- Clade: Angiosperms
- Clade: Monocots
- Order: Asparagales
- Family: Orchidaceae
- Subfamily: Orchidoideae
- Tribe: Cranichideae
- Subtribe: Goodyerinae
- Genus: Odontochilus; Blume

Synonyms
- Cystopus Blume; Evrardia Gagnep.; Evrardiana Aver.; Evrardianthe Rauschert; Kuhlhasseltia J.J.Sm.; Myrmechis Blume; Pristiglottis Cretz. & J.J.Sm.; Ramphidia Miq.; Tubilabium J.J.Sm.; Vexillabium F.Maek.

= Odontochilus =

Genus of orchids

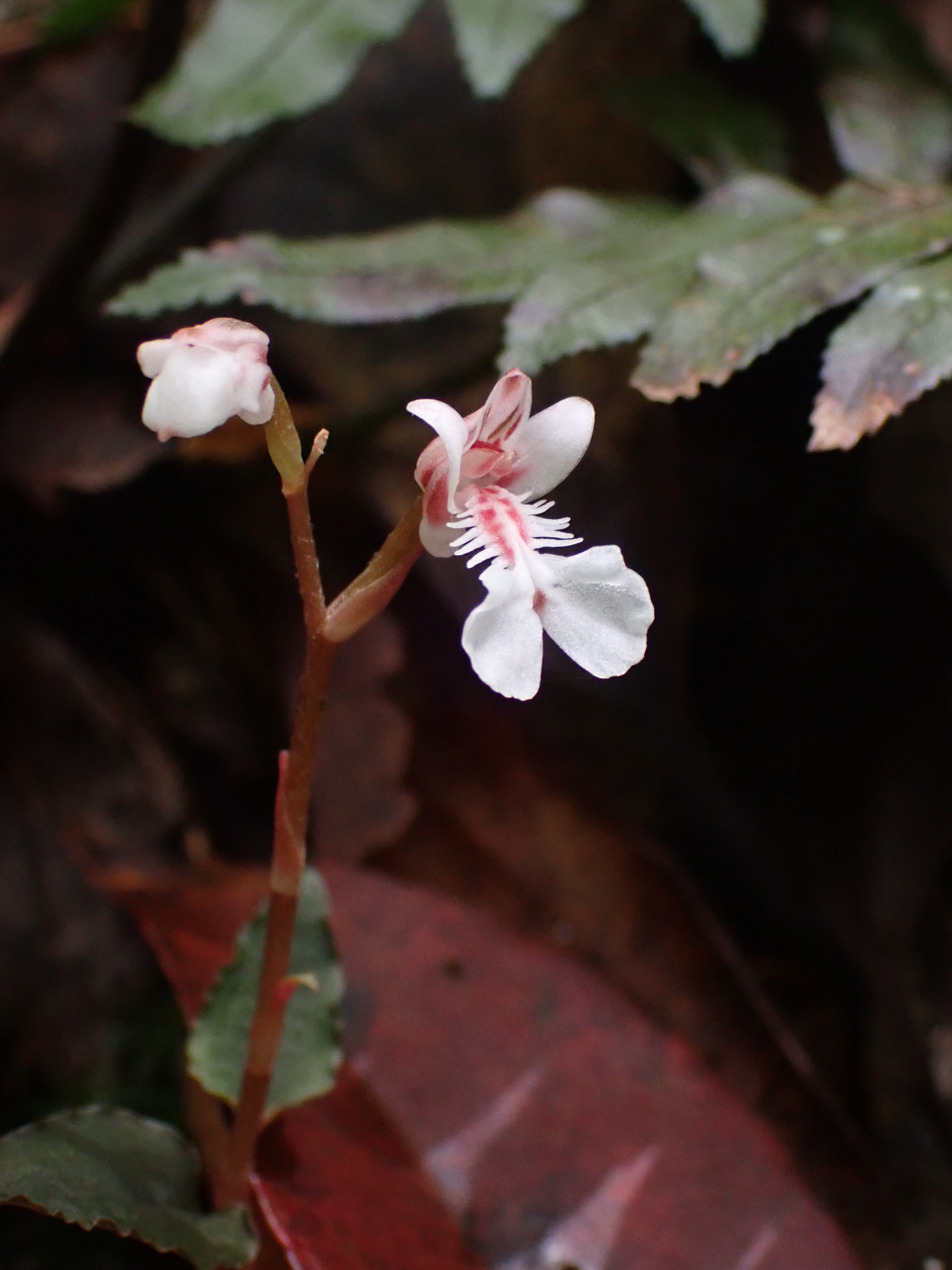
Odontochilus nanlingensis

Odontochilus is a small genus from the orchid family (Orchidaceae). These terrestrial, mycoparasitic orchids occur from China, Japan, the Himalayas, Southeast Asia, New Guinea and Melanesia. The genus is related to Gonatostylis, endemic to New Caledonia.

== Species ==
As of December 2025, Plants of the World Online accepts the following 73 species:

- Odontochilus acalcaratus (Aver.) Ormerod
- Odontochilus asraoa (J.Joseph & Abbar.) Ormerod
- Odontochilus bakhimensis (D.Maity, N.Pradhan & Maiti) T.Yukawa
- Odontochilus bilobuliferus (J.J.Sm.) T.Yukawa
- Odontochilus bisaccatus (Hayata) Hayata ex T.P.Lin
- Odontochilus brevistylis Hook.f.
- Odontochilus buruensis Ormerod & Juswara
- Odontochilus chalmersii (Schltr.) T.Yukawa
- Odontochilus chinensis (Rolfe) T.Yukawa
- Odontochilus clarkei Hook.f.
- Odontochilus coerulescens (Schltr.) J.M.H.Shaw
- Odontochilus crispus (Lindl.) Hook.f.
- Odontochilus degeneri L.O.Williams
- Odontochilus drymoglossifolius (Hayata) T.Yukawa
- Odontochilus duplex (Holttum) Ormerod
- Odontochilus elongatus (Blume) J.M.H.Shaw
- Odontochilus elwesii C.B.Clarke ex Hook.f.
- Odontochilus fimbriatus (J.J.Sm.) J.M.H.Shaw
- Odontochilus formosanus T.C.Hsu
- Odontochilus gilesii (Ormerod) T.Yukawa
- Odontochilus glaber (Blume) T.Yukawa
- Odontochilus gouanyuanensis (S.S.Ying) S.S.Ying
- Odontochilus gracilis (Blume) T.Yukawa
- Odontochilus grandiflorus (Lindl.) Benth. ex Hook.f.
- Odontochilus guangdongensis S.C.Chen, S.W.Gale & P.J.Cribb
- Odontochilus hasseltii (Blume) J.J.Wood
- Odontochilus hatumetensis (J.J.Sm.) J.M.H.Shaw
- Odontochilus hatusimanus Ohwi & T.Koyama
- Odontochilus humilis S.S.Ying
- Odontochilus hydrocephalus (J.J.Sm.) J.J.Wood
- Odontochilus integrus (Fukuy.) T.Yukawa
- Odontochilus japonicus (Rchb.f.) T.Yukawa
- Odontochilus javanicus (J.J.Sm.) T.Yukawa
- Odontochilus kinabaluensis (Carr) T.Yukawa
- Odontochilus lanceolatus (Lindl.) Blume
- Odontochilus longiflorus (Rchb.f.) Benth. & Hook.f. ex Drake
- Odontochilus macranthus Hook.f.
- Odontochilus marivelensis Ormerod & Cootes
- Odontochilus mindanaensis (Ames) J.M.H.Shaw
- Odontochilus montanus (Schltr.) J.M.H.Shaw
- Odontochilus muricatus (J.J.Sm.) T.Yukawa
- Odontochilus nakaianus (F.Maek.) T.Yukawa
- Odontochilus nandae Raskoti & Kurzweil
- Odontochilus nanlingensis (L.P.Siu & K.Y.Lang) Ormerod
- Odontochilus napoensis H.Tang & Y.F.Huang
- Odontochilus occultus (Blume) J.M.H.Shaw
- Odontochilus papuanus (J.J.Sm.) T.Yukawa
- Odontochilus pectinifer (Schltr.) J.M.H.Shaw
- Odontochilus perpusillus (Ames) T.Yukawa
- Odontochilus philippinensis (Ames) J.M.H.Shaw
- Odontochilus poilanei (Gagnep.) Ormerod
- Odontochilus puberulus (Schltr.) J.M.H.Shaw
- Odontochilus pubescens (Blume) J.M.H.Shaw
- Odontochilus pumilus Hook.f.
- Odontochilus quadrilobatus (Schltr.) T.Yukawa
- Odontochilus rajanus (J.J.Sm.) T.Yukawa
- Odontochilus reniformis (Hook.f.) Ormerod
- Odontochilus saprophyticus (Aver.) Ormerod
- Odontochilus seranicus (J.J.Sm.) T.Yukawa
- Odontochilus serriformis (J.J.Sm.) J.J.Wood
- Odontochilus shaolinchianus S.S.Ying
- Odontochilus sibelae (Ormerod) T.Yukawa
- Odontochilus spicatus (Blume) J.M.H.Shaw
- Odontochilus tashiroi (Maxim.) Makino
- Odontochilus tetrapterus (Hook.f.) Av.Bhattacharjee & H.J.Chowdhery
- Odontochilus tonkinensis (Gagnep.) Ormerod & Aver.
- Odontochilus tortus King & Pantl.
- Odontochilus tsukusianus (Masam.) T.Yukawa
- Odontochilus umbrosus (Aver.) Ormerod
- Odontochilus uniflorus (Blume) H.A.Pedersen & Ormerod
- Odontochilus urceolatus (Tang & K.Y.Lang) T.Yukawa
- Odontochilus whiteheadii (Rendle) T.Yukawa
- Odontochilus yakushimensis (Yamam.) T.Yukawa
