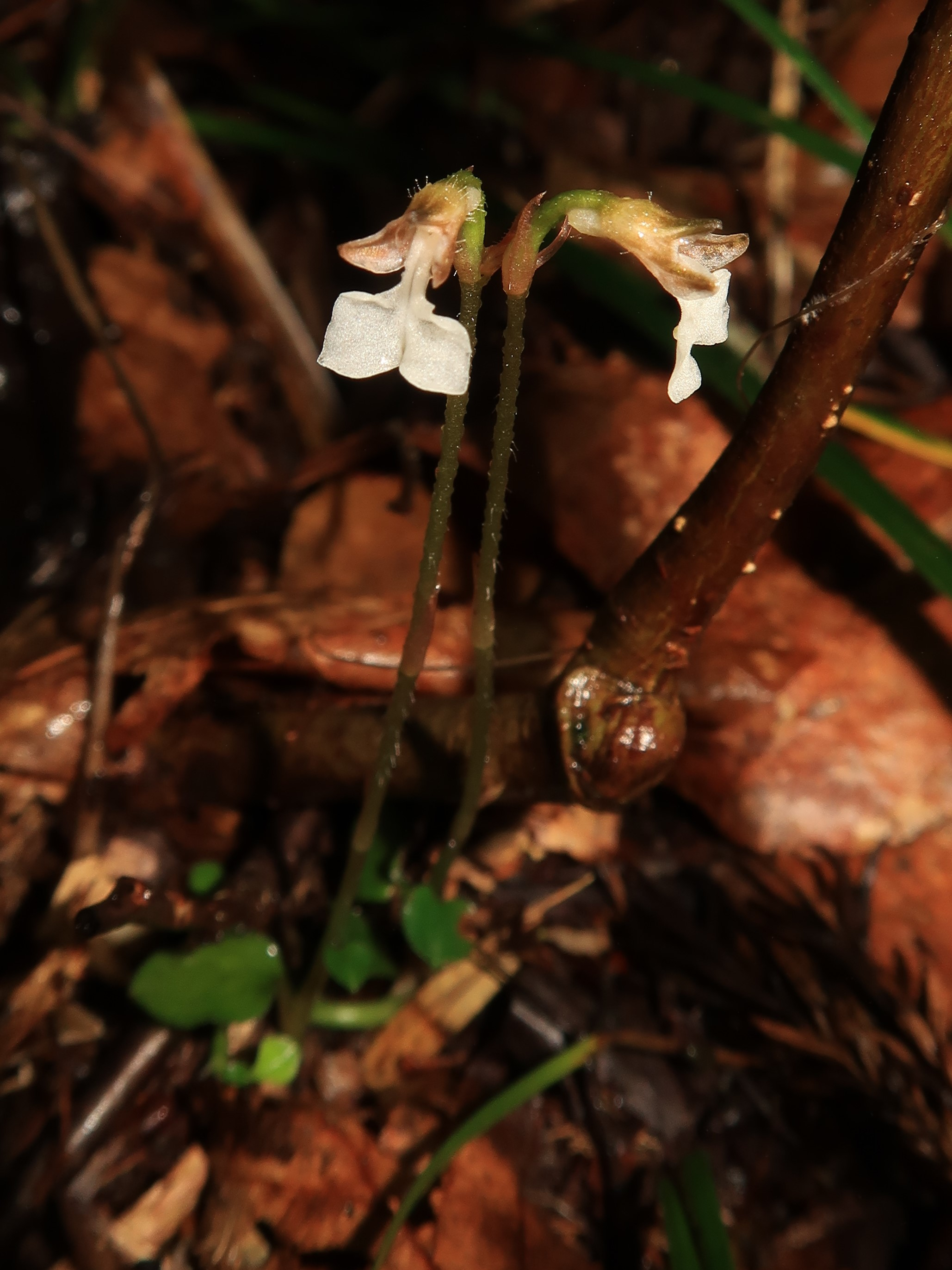
- Kuhlhasseltia nakaiana

Scientific classification
- Kingdom: Plantae
- Clade: Tracheophytes
- Clade: Angiosperms
- Clade: Monocots
- Order: Asparagales
- Family: Orchidaceae
- Subfamily: Orchidoideae
- Tribe: Cranichideae
- Subtribe: Goodyerinae
- Genus: Kuhlhasseltia; J.J.Sm.

Synonyms
- Vexillabium F.Maek.

= Kuhlhasseltia =

Species of orchid

Kuhlhasseltia is a genus of orchids (family Orchidaceae) belonging to the subfamily Orchidoideae. It is native to China, Southeast Asia and New Guinea.

== Species ==
1. Kuhlhasseltia gilesii Ormerod, Lindleyana 17: 207 (2002).
2. Kuhlhasseltia javanica J.J.Sm., Icon. Bogor.: t. 301 (1910).
3. Kuhlhasseltia muricata (J.J.Sm.) J.J.Sm., Icon. Bogor.: t. 301 (1910).
4. Kuhlhasseltia nakaiana (F.Maek.) Ormerod, Lindleyana 17: 209 (2002).
5. Kuhlhasseltia papuana J.J.Sm., Nova Guinea 12: 9 (1913).
6. Kuhlhasseltia rajana J.J.Sm., Mitt. Inst. Allg. Bot. Hamburg 7: 26 (1927).
7. Kuhlhasseltia sibelae Ormerod, Lindleyana 17: 209 (2002).
8. Kuhlhasseltia whiteheadii (Rendle) Ames, Orchidaceae 5: 32 (1915).
9. Kuhlhasseltia yakushimensis (Yamam.) Ormerod, Lindleyana 17: 209 (2003).
