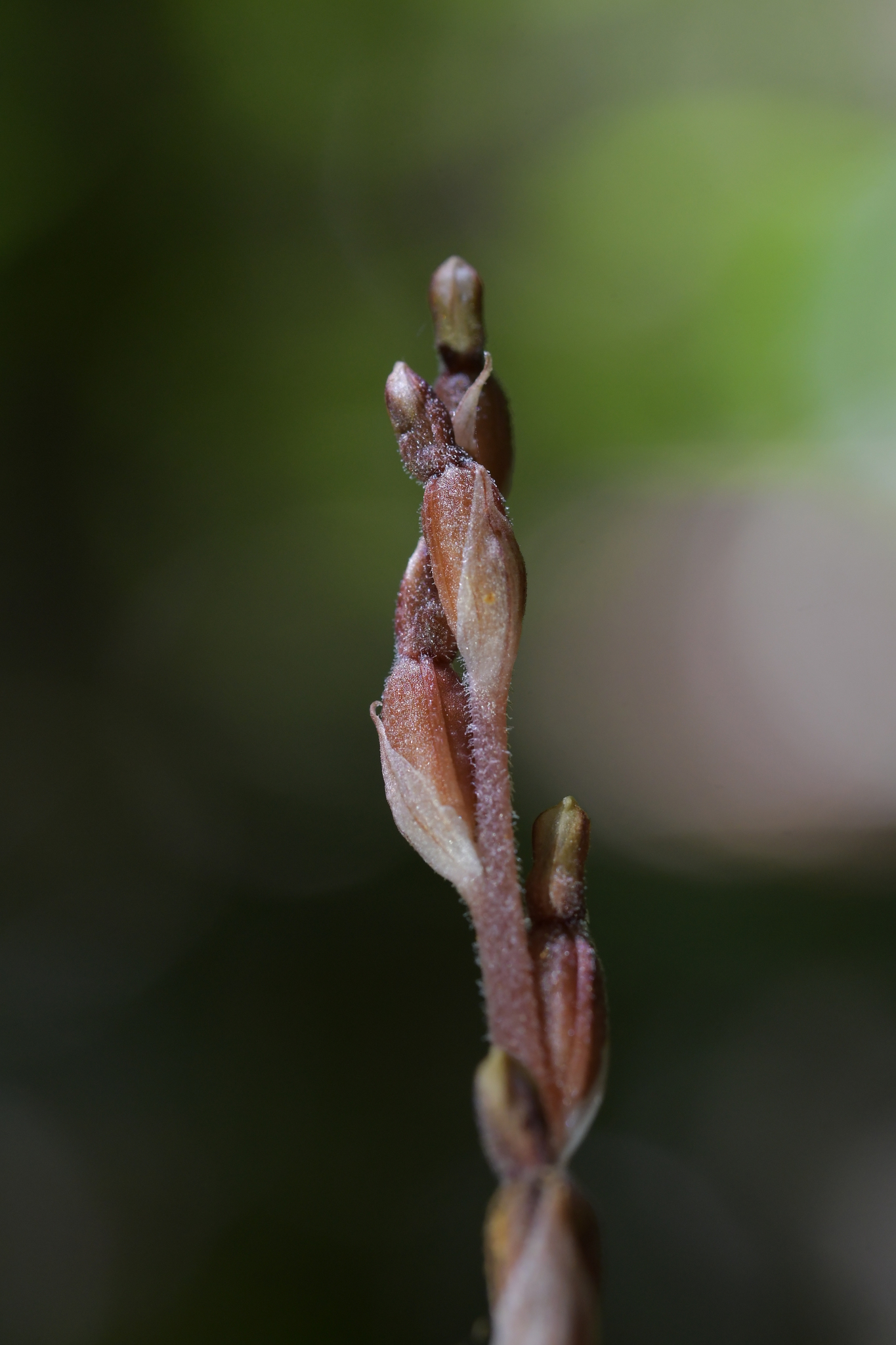

Scientific classification
- Kingdom: Plantae
- Clade: Tracheophytes
- Clade: Angiosperms
- Clade: Monocots
- Order: Asparagales
- Family: Orchidaceae
- Subfamily: Orchidoideae
- Tribe: Cranichideae
- Genus: Danhatchia
- Species: D. australis

Binomial name
- Danhatchia australis (Hatch) Garay & Christenson

Synonyms
- Yoania australis Hatch

= Danhatchia australis =

Species of orchid

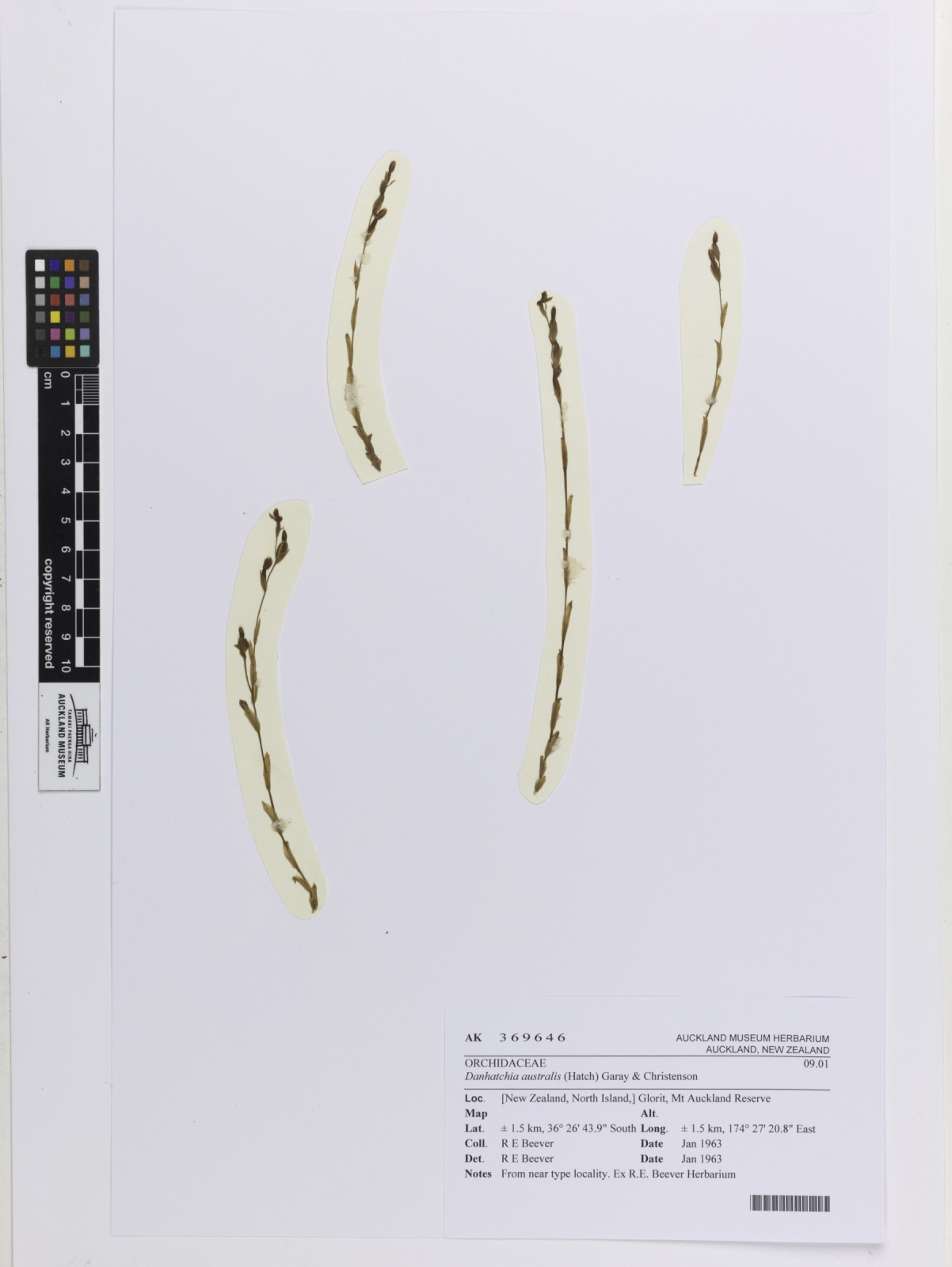
Specimen of Danhatchia australis

Danhatchia australis is a species of terrestrial orchid, lacking chlorophyll and obtaining nutrients from fungi in the soil. It is native to New Zealand (both main islands) and to New South Wales. Within New Zealand, this species is classified as At Risk - Naturally Uncommon.
