= Gonatostylis =

Scientific classification
- Kingdom: Plantae
- Clade: Tracheophytes
- Clade: Angiosperms
- Clade: Monocots
- Order: Asparagales
- Family: Orchidaceae
- Subfamily: Orchidoideae
- Tribe: Cranichideae
- Subtribe: Goodyerinae
- Genus: Gonatostylis; Schltr.

Genus of orchids

Gonatostylis is a genus of flowering plants from the orchid family, Orchidaceae. It contains only two species, both endemic to New Caledonia.

- Gonatostylis bougainvillei N.Hallé
- Gonatostylis vieillardii (Rchb.f.) Schltr.

== See also ==
- List of Orchidaceae genera
