= Halleorchis =

Conservation status
- Endangered (IUCN 3.1)
- CITES Appendix II

Scientific classification
- Kingdom: Plantae
- Clade: Tracheophytes
- Clade: Angiosperms
- Clade: Monocots
- Order: Asparagales
- Family: Orchidaceae
- Subfamily: Orchidoideae
- Tribe: Cranichideae
- Genus: Halleorchis; Szlach. & Olszewski
- Species: H. aspidogynoides

Binomial name
- Halleorchis aspidogynoides Szlach. & Olszewski

Genus of plants

Halleorchis is a genus of terrestrial orchids containing only one species, Halleorchis aspidogynoides, which is an endangered species native to Central Africa.

== Distribution and habitat ==
Halleorchis aspidogynoides is known only from two populations: one at Belinga in Gabon, and one at Lolodorf in Cameroon. A 2017 assessment for the IUCN Red List of Threatened Species estimated the total area of occupancy of this species to be 8 km^{2} (3.1 sq mi). It grows at the base of damp rocks in humid forests at altitudes of 850–950 m (2,790–3,120 ft).

== Description ==
Halleorchis aspidogynoides is a terrestrial herb. The stem is erect and grows to 34 cm (13 in) long. The leaves are ovate-lanceolate, measuring 10.5 cm (4.1 in) long and 2.8 cm (1.1 in) wide. The scape grows to 23 cm (9.1 in) long. The inflorescence is a 13 cm (5.1 in) spike that carries 50-60 delicate pink flowers.

== Conservation status ==
Halleorchis aspidogynoides is listed as endangered on the International Union for Conservation of Nature's Red List under criteria B2ab(iii), based on its area of occupancy and the small number of locations at which this species is present. The two known populations of H. aspidogynoides occur in unprotected areas and are at risk of human disturbance. The main threat to the population in Gabon is mining, while the population in Cameroon is threatened by urbanization, agriculture (particularly cocoa farming), and logging.
