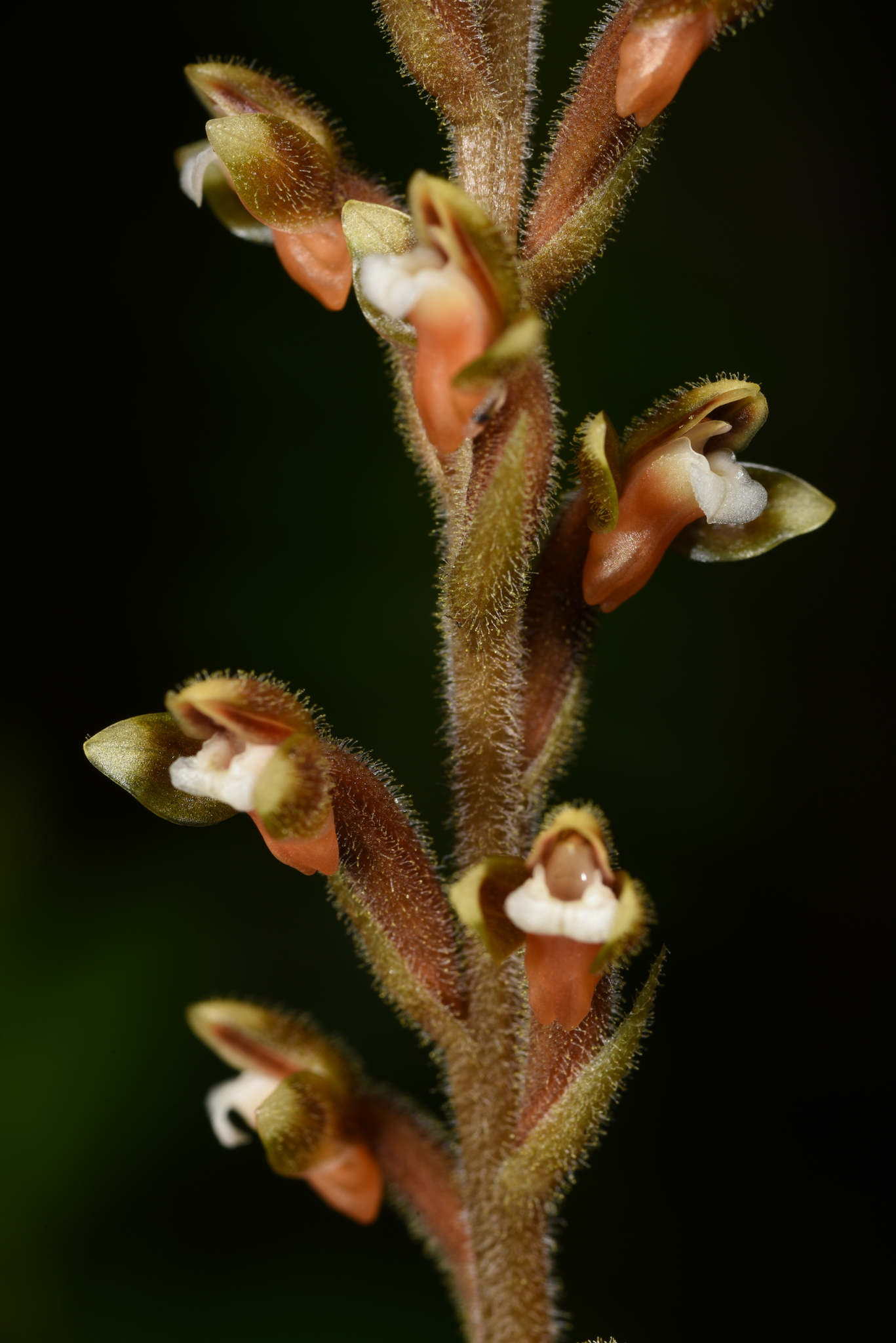
- Erythrodes chinensis

Scientific classification
- Kingdom: Plantae
- Clade: Tracheophytes
- Clade: Angiosperms
- Clade: Monocots
- Order: Asparagales
- Family: Orchidaceae
- Subfamily: Orchidoideae
- Tribe: Cranichideae
- Subtribe: Goodyerinae
- Genus: Erythrodes; Blume

Synonyms
- Physurus Rich. ex Lindl., superfluous illegitimate name

= Erythrodes =

False helmet orchids

Genus of orchids

Erythrodes (false helmetorchid) is a genus of flowering plants from the orchid family, Orchidaceae. It contains 26 currently recognised species, native to Southeast Asia, China, the Indian subcontinent, New Guinea, and some islands of the Pacific.

- Erythrodes aggregata (T.P.Lin & W.M.Lin) T.P.Lin
- Erythrodes amboinensis (J.J.Sm.) J.J.Sm. - Ambon
- Erythrodes bicarinata Schltr. - New Guinea, Vanuatu
- Erythrodes blumei (Lindl.) Schltr. in K.M.Schumann & C.A.G.Lauterbach - from Assam east to Taiwan, south to Java
- Erythrodes boettcheri Ames - Luzon
- Erythrodes celebensis P.O'Byrne - Sulawesi
- Erythrodes chinensis (Rolfe) Schltr.
- Erythrodes forcipata Schltr. - New Guinea
- Erythrodes glandulosa (Lindl.) Ames - Borneo
- Erythrodes glaucescens Schltr. - New Guinea
- Erythrodes hirsuta (Griff.) Ormerod in G.Seidenfaden - Hainan, Assam, Bhutan, Myanmar, Thailand, Vietnam
- Erythrodes humilis (Blume) J.J.Sm. - Java, Sumatra, peninsular Malaysia
- Erythrodes johorensis (P.O'Byrne) Ormerod - peninsular Malaysia
- Erythrodes latifolia Blume - Java, Sumatra, peninsular Malaysia
- Erythrodes latiloba Ormerod - Sri Lanka
- Erythrodes oxyglossa Schltr. - Fiji, New Caledonia, Samoa, Tonga, Vanuatu, Wallis & Futuna
- Erythrodes papuana Schltr. in K.M.Schumann & C.A.G.Lauterbach - New Guinea
- Erythrodes parvula Kores - Fiji, Tonga
- Erythrodes praemorsa Schltr. - New Guinea
- Erythrodes purpurascens Schltr. in K.M.Schumann & C.A.G.Lauterbach - New Guinea, Fiji, Tonga, Samoa
- Erythrodes sepikana Schltr. - New Guinea
- Erythrodes tetrodonta Ormerod - New Guinea
- Erythrodes torricellensis Schltr. - New Guinea
- Erythrodes triloba Carr - Sabah
- Erythrodes weberi Ames - Philippines
- Erythrodes wenzelii Ames - Philippines

== See also ==
- List of Orchidaceae genera
