= Aspidogyne mendoncae =

Scientific classification
- Kingdom: Plantae
- Clade: Tracheophytes
- Clade: Angiosperms
- Clade: Monocots
- Order: Asparagales
- Family: Orchidaceae
- Subfamily: Orchidoideae
- Tribe: Cranichideae
- Genus: Aspidogyne
- Species: A. mendoncae

Binomial name
- Aspidogyne mendoncae (Brade & Pabst) Ormerod

Synonyms
- Erythrodes mendoncae Brade & Pabst (basionym); Rhamphorhynchus mendoncae (Brade & Pabst) Garay

Species of flowering plant

Aspidogyne mendoncae is a species of orchid that grows in Brazil.

== Biology ==
Aspidogyne mendoncae grows in humus on the floor of lowland forests, in the Brazilian state of Espírito Santo.

== Taxonomic history ==
Aspidogyne mendoncae was first described by Alexander Curt Brade and Guido Frederico João Pabst in 1958, under the name Erythrodes mendoncae. In 1977, Leslie Andrew Garay transferred the species to a new, monotypic genus, Rhamphorhynchus, as Rhamphorhynchus mendoncae. In 2008, Paul Ormerod concluded that the genus Rhamphorhynchyus could not be maintained as separate from Aspidogyne, creating the current combination, Aspidogyne mendoncae.
