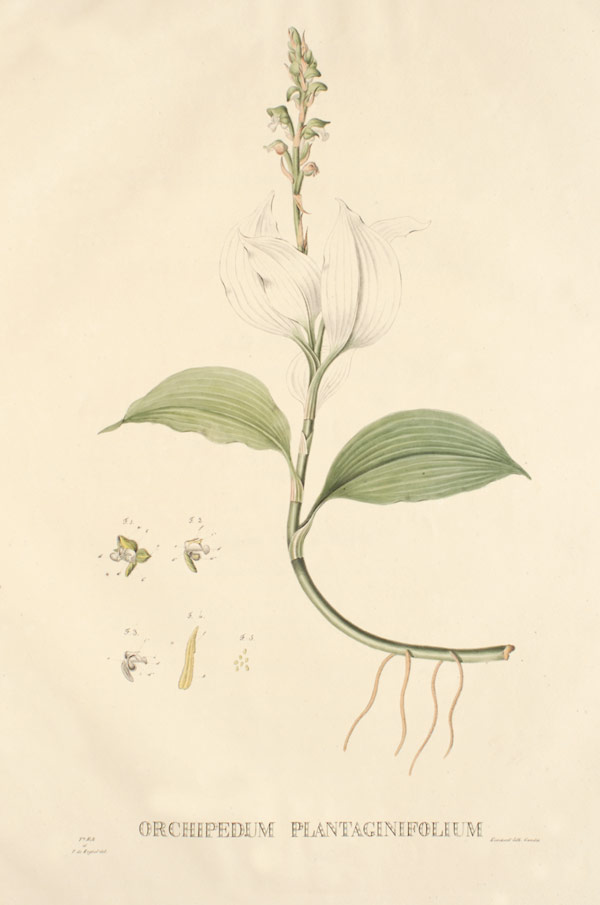
- Orchipedum plantaginifolium 1829 illustration

Scientific classification
- Kingdom: Plantae
- Clade: Tracheophytes
- Clade: Angiosperms
- Clade: Monocots
- Order: Asparagales
- Family: Orchidaceae
- Subfamily: Orchidoideae
- Tribe: Cranichideae
- Subtribe: Goodyerinae
- Genus: Orchipedum; Breda, Gen. Sp. Orchid. Asclep. 2: t. 10 (1829)

Type species
- Orchipedum plantaginifolium Breda

Synonyms
- Queteletia Blume, Coll. Orchid.: 117 (1859); Philippinaea Schltr. & Ames in O.Ames, Orchidaceae 6: 278 (1920)

= Orchipedum (plant) =

Genus of orchids

Orchipedum is a genus of flowering plants from the orchid family, Orchidaceae. It contains three known species, all native to Southeast Asia.

1. Orchipedum echinatum Aver. & Averyanova - Vietnam
2. Orchipedum plantaginifolium Breda - Thailand, Java, Peninsular Malaysia
3. Orchipedum wenzelii (Ames) J.J.Sm. - Philippines

== See also ==
- List of Orchidaceae genera
