= Orchipedum (flatworm) =

Scientific classification
- Kingdom: Animalia
- Phylum: Platyhelminthes
- Class: Trematoda
- Order: Plagiorchiida
- Family: Orchipedidae
- Genus: Orchipedum; Braun, 1901

Type species
- Orchipedum tracheicola Braun, 1901

Genus of flukes

Orchipedum is a genus of trematodes in the family Orchipedidae.
