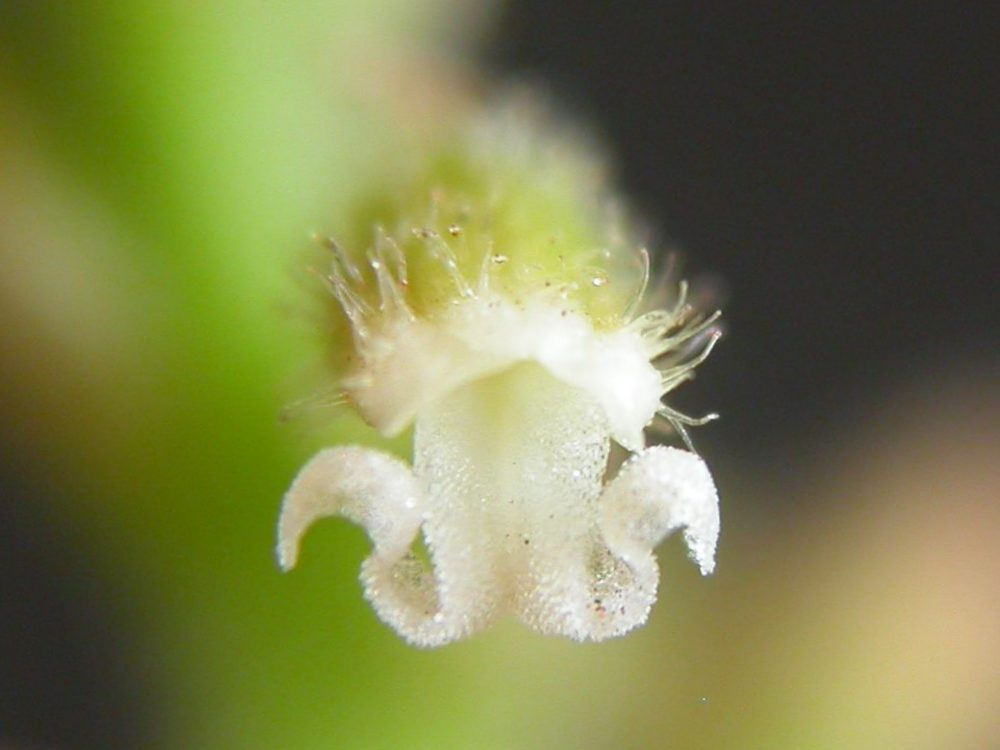
- Microchilus arietinus

Scientific classification
- Kingdom: Plantae
- Clade: Tracheophytes
- Clade: Angiosperms
- Clade: Monocots
- Order: Asparagales
- Family: Orchidaceae
- Subfamily: Orchidoideae
- Tribe: Cranichideae
- Subtribe: Goodyerinae
- Genus: Microchilus; C.Presl.

Synonyms
- List: Aspidogyne Garay in Bradea 2: 200 (1977); Kreodanthus Garay in Bradea 2: 198 (1977); Ligeophila Garay in Bradea 2: 194 (1977); Platythelys Garay in Bradea 2: 196 (1977); Rhamphorhynchus Garay in Bradea 2: 196 (1977); Stephanothelys Garay in Bradea 2: 199 (1977)

= Microchilus =

Genus of orchids

Microchilus is a neotropical genus of about 261 species belonging to the orchid family (Orchidaceae). The native range of this genus is tropical & subtropical America.

It was first described by Carl Borivoj Presl in 1827, but the genus was not widely recognized until it was separated in 2002 by P. Ormerod from the genus Erythrodes s. str.. It corresponds to its New World species. The two genera were distinguished by the different characters of the column and pollinia. It need dissecting the flowers, to see the differences at generic level with Erythrodes.

In 2005, another 32 new species were added to this genus by Ormerod.

The horticultural abbreviation for this genus is Mcr.

== Selected species ==
- Microchilus anchoriferus (Schltr.) Ormerod (2002) - (Western South America)
- Microchilus arietinus (Rchb.f. & Warm.) Ormerod (2002) - (tropical America to Argentina)
- Microchilus austrobrasiliensis (Porsch) Ormerod (2002) - (Brazil)
- Microchilus bimentatus (Dressler) Ormerod (2004) - (Costa Rica)
- Microchilus brachyplectron (Pabst) Ormerod (2002) - (Brazil)
- Microchilus brunnescens Ormerod (2005) - (Ecuador)
- Microchilus buchtienii (Schltr.) Ormerod (2002) - (Bolivia)
- Microchilus callophylloides (Garay) Ormerod (2002) - (Ecuador)
- Microchilus calophyllus (Rchb.f.) Ormerod (2002) - (Costa Rica)
- Microchilus campanulatus Ormerod (2005) - (Venezuela)
- Microchilus capitatus Ormerod (2005) - (Peru)
- Microchilus caucanus (Schltr.) Ormerod (2002) - (Colombia)
- Microchilus constrictus Ormerod (2005) (Amazonas)
- Microchilus curviflorus Ormerod (2005) - (Venezuela)
- Microchilus densiflorus (Lindl.) D.Dietr. (1852) - (Brazil)
- Microchilus dolichostachys (Schltr.) Ormerod (2002) - (Colombia)
- Microchilus ecuadorensis (Garay) Ormerod (2002) - (Ecuador)
- Microchilus ensicalcar Ormerod (2005) - (Peru)
- Microchilus epiphyticus (Dressler) Ormerod (2002) - (Costa Rica, Panama)
- Microchilus erythrodoides (Schltr.) Ormerod (2002) - (Colombia, Venezuela)
- Microchilus fendleri Ormerod (2005) - (Venezuela)
- Microchilus fosbergii Ormerod (2005) - (Colombia)
- Microchilus glacensis (Dod) Ormerod, Lindleyana 17: 216 (2002) - (Haiti)
- Microchilus glanduliferus Ormerod (2005) - (Venezuela)
- Microchilus globosus Ormerod (2005) - (Colombia)
- Microchilus haughtii Ormerod (2005) - (Colombia)
- Microchilus herzogii (Schltr.) Ormerod, Lindleyana 17: 217 (2002) - (Bolivia)
- Microchilus hirtellus (Sw.) D.Dietr. (1852) - (West Indies - threatened or endangered species; northern South America)
- Microchilus hughjonesii Ormerod (2005) - (Colombia)
- Microchilus integrus Ormerod (2005) - (Ecuador)
- Microchilus kuduyariensis Ormerod (2005) - (Colombia)
- Microchilus lamprophyllus (Linden & Rchb.f.) Ormerod (2002) - (Brazil)
- Microchilus laticalcar (Dod) Ormerod (2002) - (Dominican rep.)
- Microchilus lechleri Ormerod (2005) - (Peru)
- Microchilus luniferus (Schltr.) Ormerod (2002) - (Mexico to Central America)
- Microchilus madrinanii Ormerod (2005) - (Colombia)
- Microchilus major C.Presl (1827) - (north & west South America)
- Microchilus mexicanus (Ames) Ormerod (2002) - (Mexico)
- Microchilus micayvallis Ormerod (2005) - (Colombia)
- Microchilus microcaprinus Ormerod (2005) - (Peru)
- Microchilus minor C.Presl (1827) (Peru)
- Microchilus moritzii Ormerod (2005) - (Venezuela)
- Microchilus nigrescens (Schltr.) Ormerod (2002) - (Costa Rica to Ecuador)
- Microchilus ortgiesii (Rchb.f.) Ormerod (2002) - (Colombia)
- Microchilus ovatus (Lindl.) D.Dietr. (1852) - (Colombia, Venezuela)
- Microchilus paleaceus (Schltr.) Ormerod (2002) - (Caribbean, W. South America to N. Brazil)
- Microchilus panamanicus Ormerod (2005) - (Panama)
- Microchilus pauciflorus (Poepp. & Endl.) D.Dietr. (1852) - (Brazil)
- Microchilus pedrojuanensis Ormerod (2005) - (Paraguay)
- Microchilus peytonorum Ormerod (2005) - (Peru)
- Microchilus plantagineus (L.) D.Dietr. (1852) - (Caribbean - threatened or endangered species; Venezuela)
- Microchilus platanilloensis Ormerod (2004) - (Costa Rica)
- Microchilus platysepalus Ormerod (2005) - (Colombia)
- Microchilus plowmanii Ormerod (2005) - (Peru)
- Microchilus preslii Ormerod (2002) - (Peru)
- Microchilus pseudobrunnescens Ormerod (2005) - (Ecuador)
- Microchilus pseudominor Ormerod (2005) - (Colombia)
- Microchilus putumayoensis Ormerod (2005) - (Colombia)
- Microchilus quadratus (Garay) Ormerod (2002) - (Colombia, Ecuador)
- Microchilus rioesmeraldae Ormerod (2005) - (Colombia)
- Microchilus rioitayanus Ormerod (2005) - (Peru)
- Microchilus riopalenquensis Ormerod (2004) - (Ecuador, Peru)
- Microchilus rojasii Ormerod (2005) - (Paraguay)
- Microchilus schultesianus (Garay) Ormerod (2002) - (Trinidad)
- Microchilus scrotiformis (C.Schweinf.) Ormerod (2002) - (Colombia, Venezuela)
- Microchilus sparreorum (Garay) Ormerod (2002) - (Ecuador)
- Microchilus sprucei (Garay) Ormerod (2002) - (Ecuador)
- Microchilus tridax (Rchb.f.) Ormerod (2002) - (Central America)
- Microchilus trifasciatusOrmerod (2002) - (Peru)
- Microchilus valverdei Ormerod (2005) - (Costa Rica)
- Microchilus venezuelanus (Garay & Dunst.) Ormerod (2002) - (Venezuela)
- Microchilus vesicifer (Rchb.f.) Ormerod (2002) - (Mexico to Peru)
- Microchilus weberianus (Garay) Ormerod (2002) - (Ecuador, Galapagos)
- Microchilus xystophyllus (Rchb.f.) Ormerod (2002) - (Venezuela, Brazil)
- Microchilus zeuxinoides (Schltr.) Ormerod (2002) - (Colombia)

== Other sources ==
- Ormerod, P. 2002. Taxonomic changes in Goodyerinae (Orchidaceae: Orchidoideae). Lindleyana 17: 189-238
- Ormerod, P. 2005. Studies of Neotropical Goodyerinae (Orchidaceae). Harvard Pap. Bot. 9: 391–423
