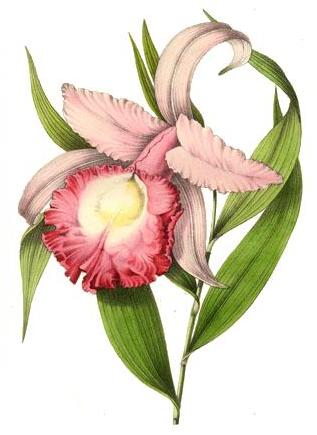
- Sobralia macrantha

Scientific classification
- Kingdom: Plantae
- Clade: Tracheophytes
- Clade: Angiosperms
- Clade: Monocots
- Order: Asparagales
- Family: Orchidaceae
- Subfamily: Epidendroideae
- Tribe: Arethuseae
- Subtribe: Sobraliinae

Genera
- Elleanthus C.Presl; Sobralia Ruiz & Pav.

= Sobraliinae =

Subtribe of orchids

Sobraliinae is a subtribe of orchids (family Orchidaceae). Sobraliinae includes two genera, Elleanthus and Sobralia. It is a sub-tribe of the subfamily Epidendroideae, family Orchidaceae. The APG III classification now considers that it is the tribe of Sobralieae also including the genus Sertifera, whereas before, this sub-tribe was not classified in a tribe.
