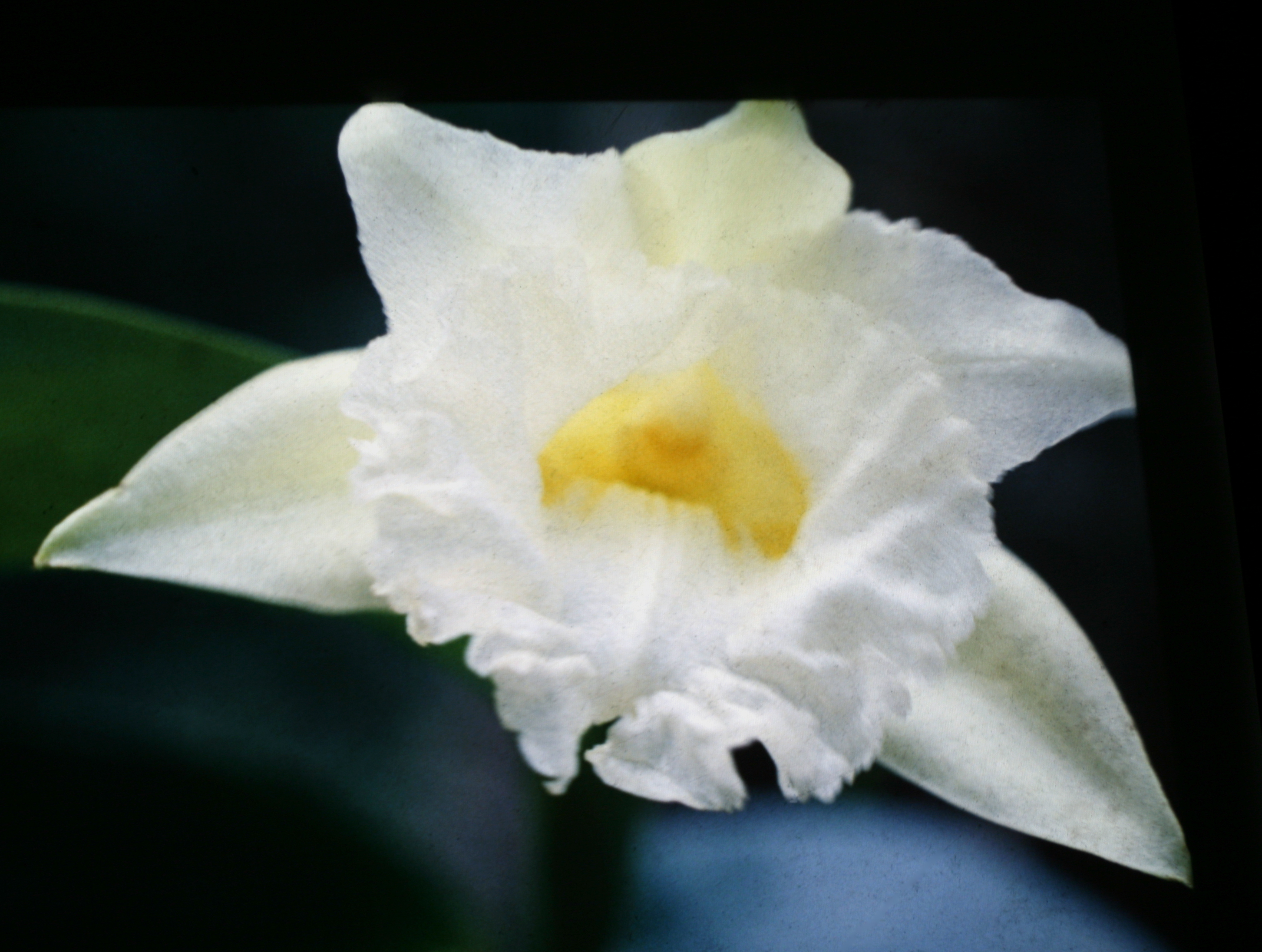
- Flower of Sobralia macrophylla

Scientific classification
- Kingdom: Plantae
- Clade: Tracheophytes
- Clade: Angiosperms
- Clade: Monocots
- Order: Asparagales
- Family: Orchidaceae
- Subfamily: Epidendroideae
- Genus: Sobralia
- Species: S. macrophylla

Binomial name
- Sobralia macrophylla Rchb.f.

Synonyms
- Sobralia chlorantha Hook.; Cattleya chlorantha (Hook.) Beer; Cyathoglottis macrantha Lem.

= Sobralia macrophylla =

Large-leafed sobralia

Species of orchid

Sobralia macrophylla, commonly known as the large-leafed sobralia, is a species of orchid found from Central America to tropical South America.

In the past, the naming of Sobralia chlorantha was also widely used. Noticeably different in appearance from other members of the genus.

== Gallery ==
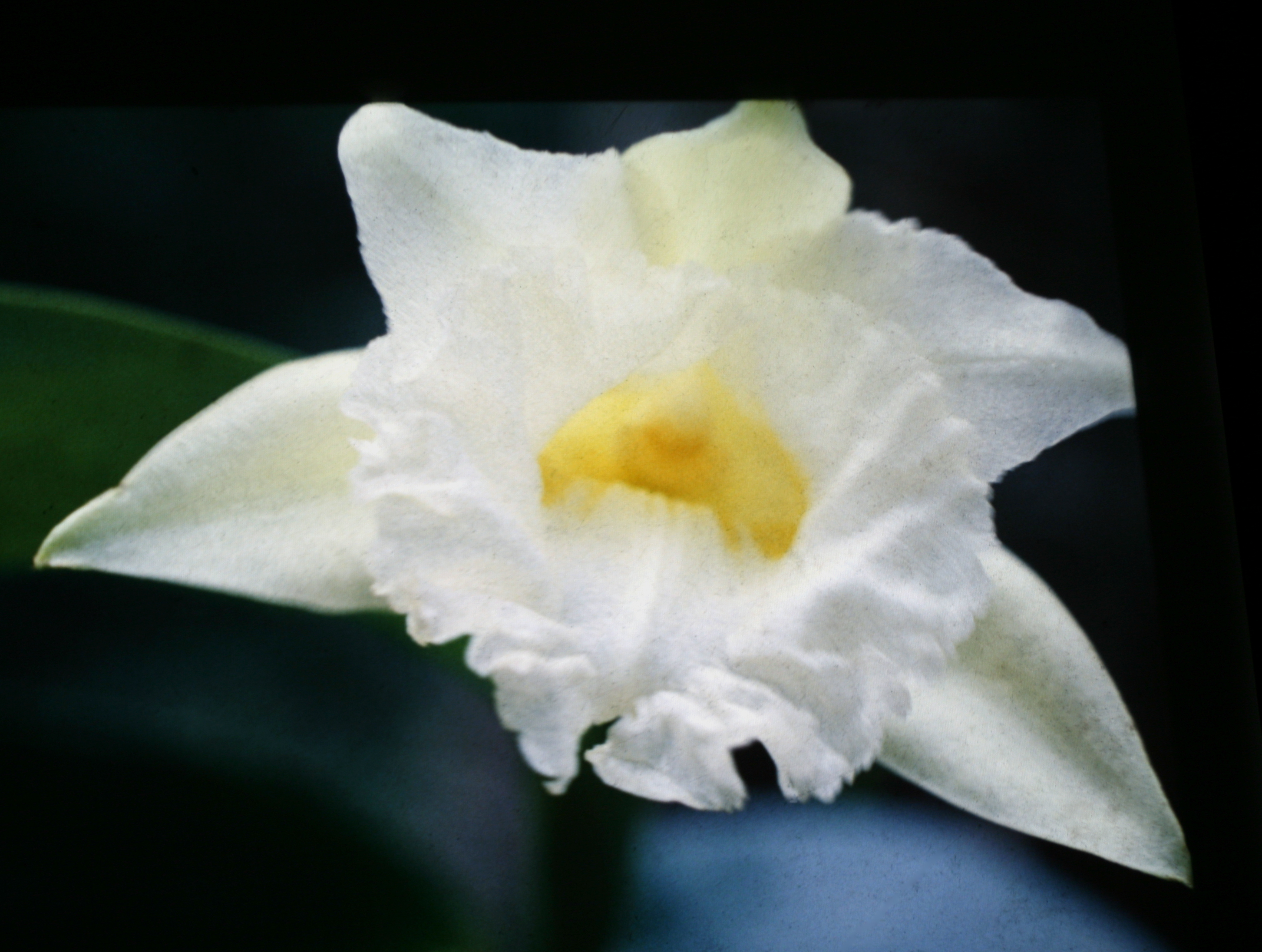
Sobralia macrophylla

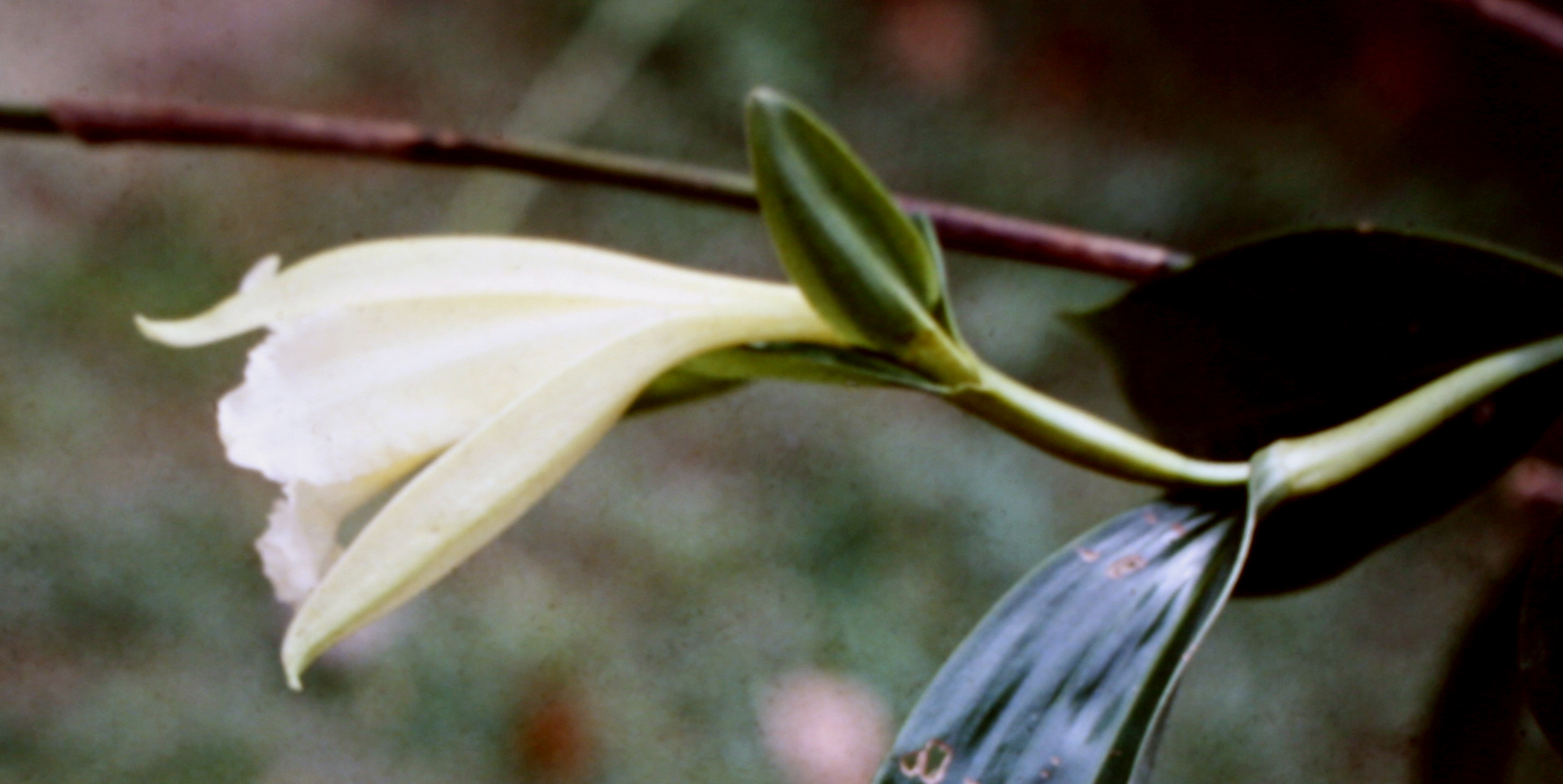
Sobralia macrophylla

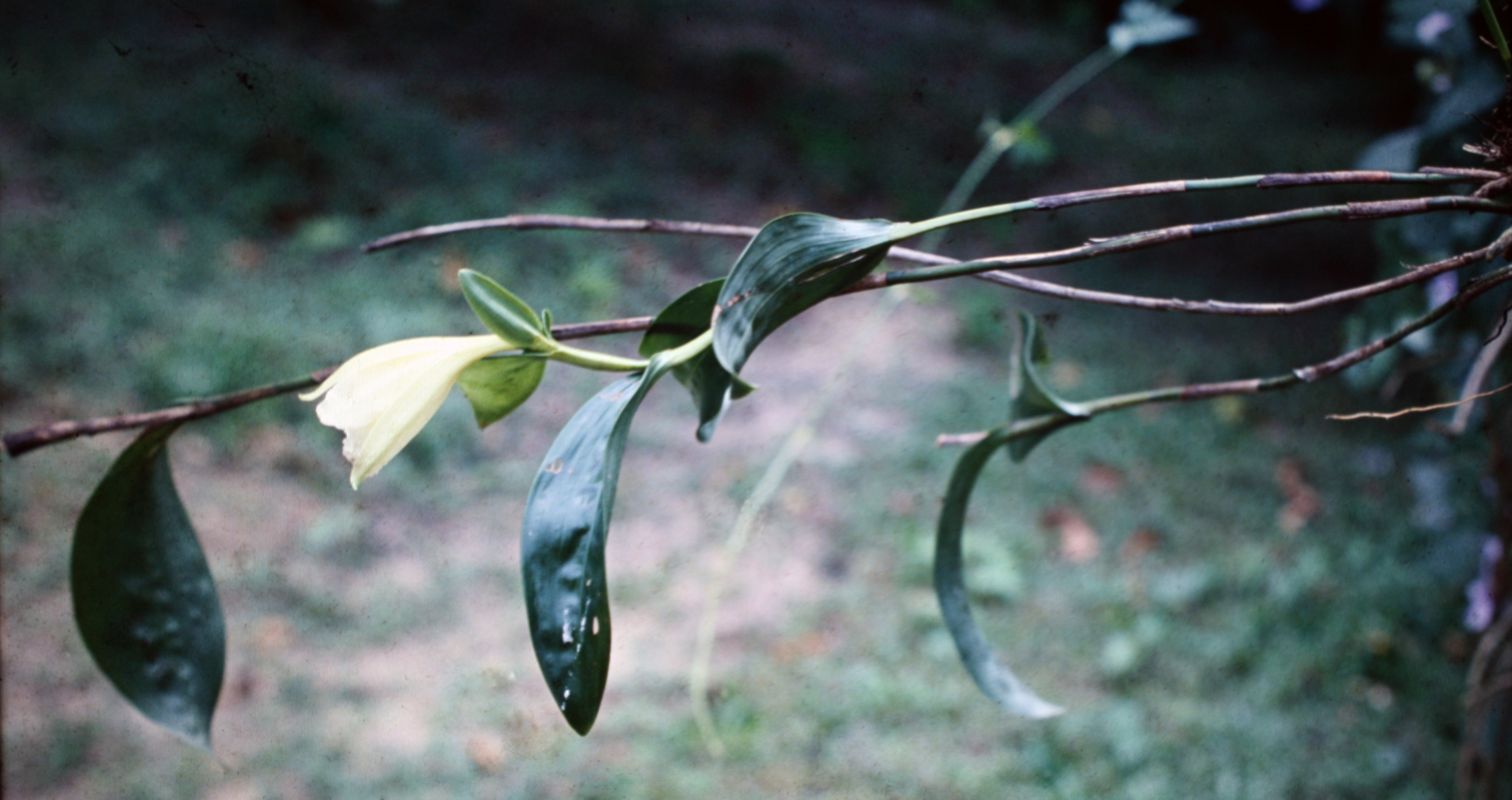
Sobralia macrophylla

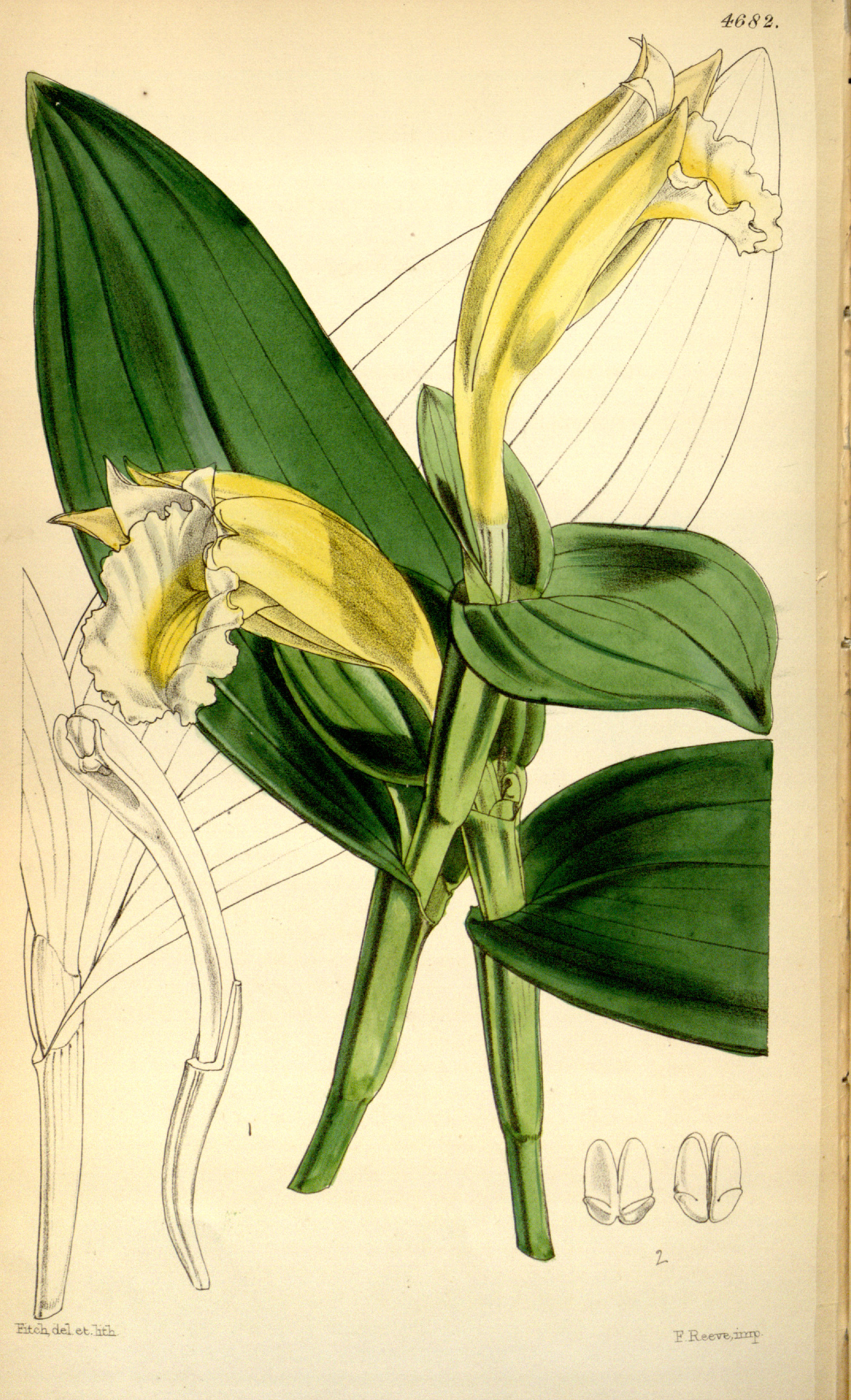
Curtis's Botanical Magazine vol. 78 (ser. 3 no. 8) tab. 4682 (as syn. Sobralia chlorantha)

== See also ==
- Sobralia decora
- Sobralia macrantha
