= S. neglecta =

S. neglecta may refer to:

- Scorpaena neglecta, a marine fish species in the genus Scorpaena
- Serapias neglecta, an orchid species endemic to southern Europe
- Sitta neglecta, the chestnut-bellied nuthatch, a bird species
- Sturnella neglecta, the western meadowlark, a medium-sized icterid bird species

== Synonyms ==
- Schinia neglecta, a synonym for Schinia diffusa, a moth species found in North America
- Sobralia neglecta, a synonym for Sobralia decora, the beautiful sobralia, an orchid species

== See also ==
- Neglecta (disambiguation)
