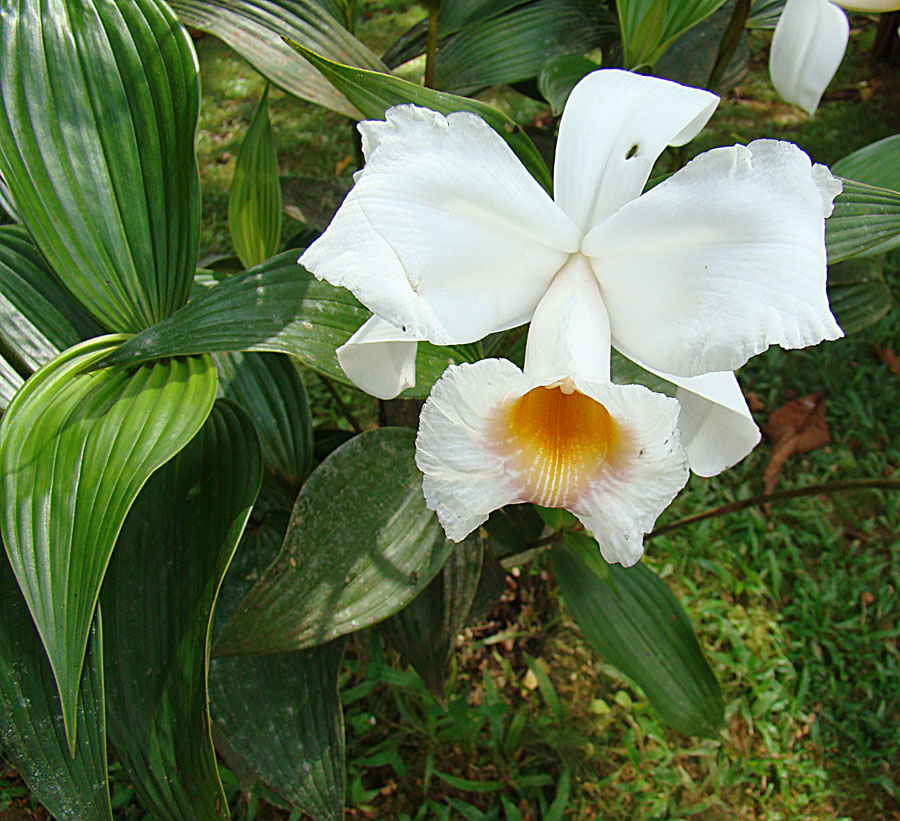

Scientific classification
- Kingdom: Plantae
- Clade: Tracheophytes
- Clade: Angiosperms
- Clade: Monocots
- Order: Asparagales
- Family: Orchidaceae
- Subfamily: Epidendroideae
- Genus: Sobralia
- Species: S. leucoxantha

Binomial name
- Sobralia leucoxantha Rchb. f. 1866

= Sobralia leucoxantha =

Species of orchid

Sobralia leucoxantha is a species of Sobralia.

== Distribution ==
Plants are found growing in Mexico (Chiapas), Costa Rica, Panama and Colombia.
