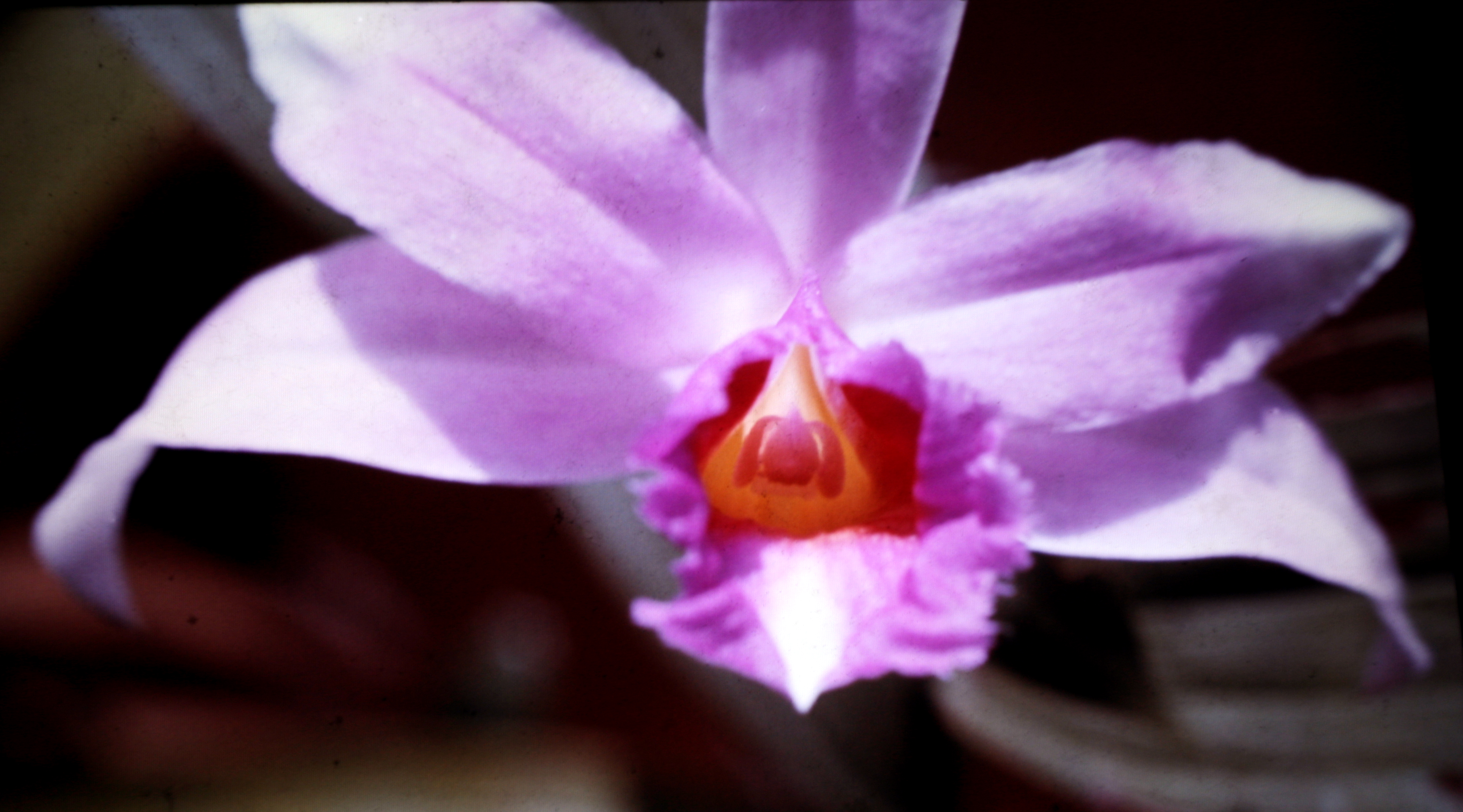
- Sobralia decora (syn. Sobralia sessilis), Suriname

Scientific classification
- Kingdom: Plantae
- Clade: Tracheophytes
- Clade: Angiosperms
- Clade: Monocots
- Order: Asparagales
- Family: Orchidaceae
- Subfamily: Epidendroideae
- Tribe: Sobralieae; Pfitzer, Entw. Nat. Anord. Orch., (1987)

Genera
- Elleanthus; Epilyna; Sertifera; Sobralia

= Sobralieae =

Tribe of orchids

Sobralieae is an orchid tribe in the subfamily Epidendroideae.

== See also ==
- Taxonomy of the Orchidaceae
