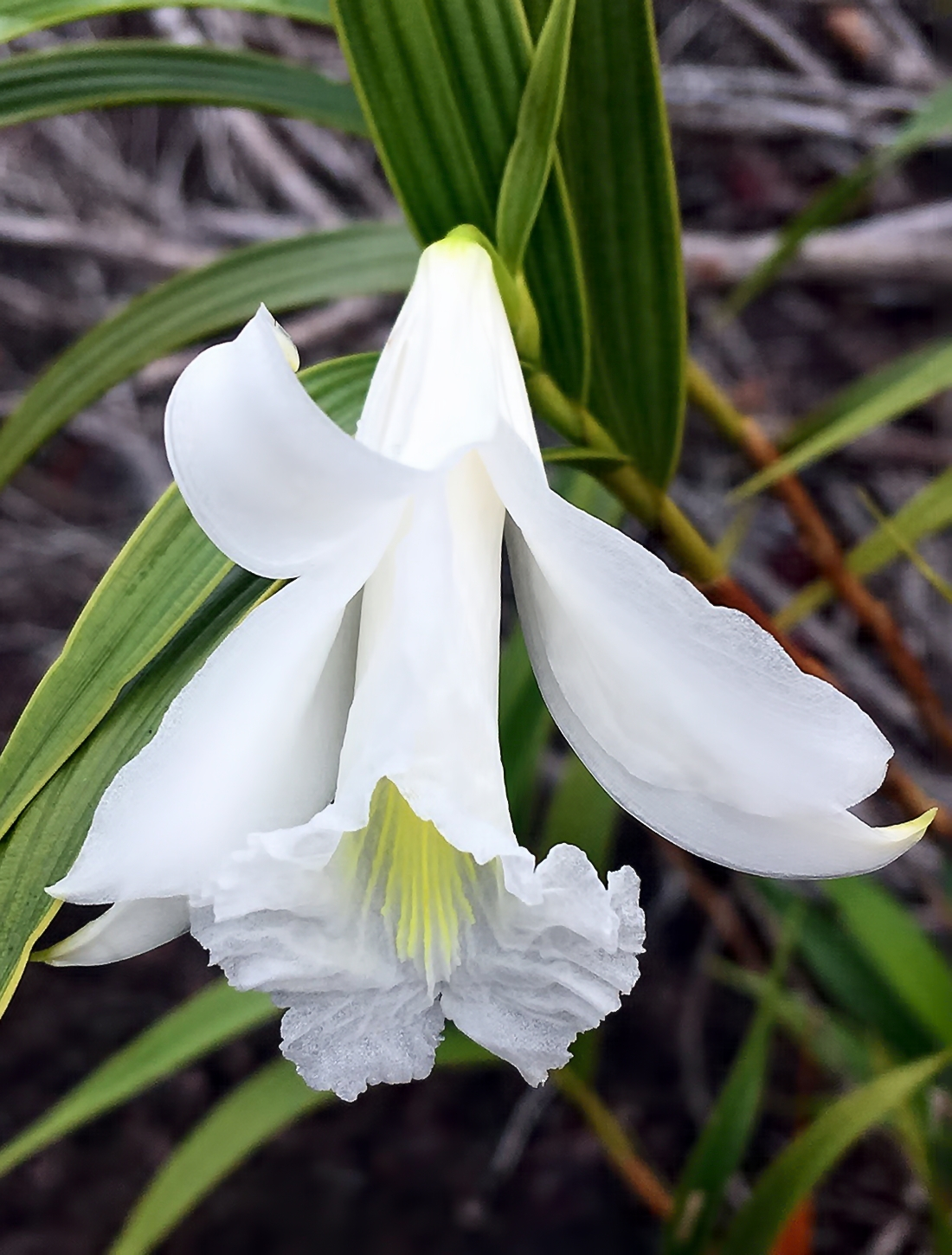

Scientific classification
- Kingdom: Plantae
- Clade: Tracheophytes
- Clade: Angiosperms
- Clade: Monocots
- Order: Asparagales
- Family: Orchidaceae
- Subfamily: Epidendroideae
- Genus: Sobralia
- Species: S. granitica

Binomial name
- Sobralia granitica G.A.Romero & Carnevali 2000

= Sobralia granitica =

Species of orchid

Sobralia granitica is a species of Sobralia.

== Distribution ==
Plants have been found in Colombia, Venezuela, and Brazil growing at elevations of 50 to 700 meters.
