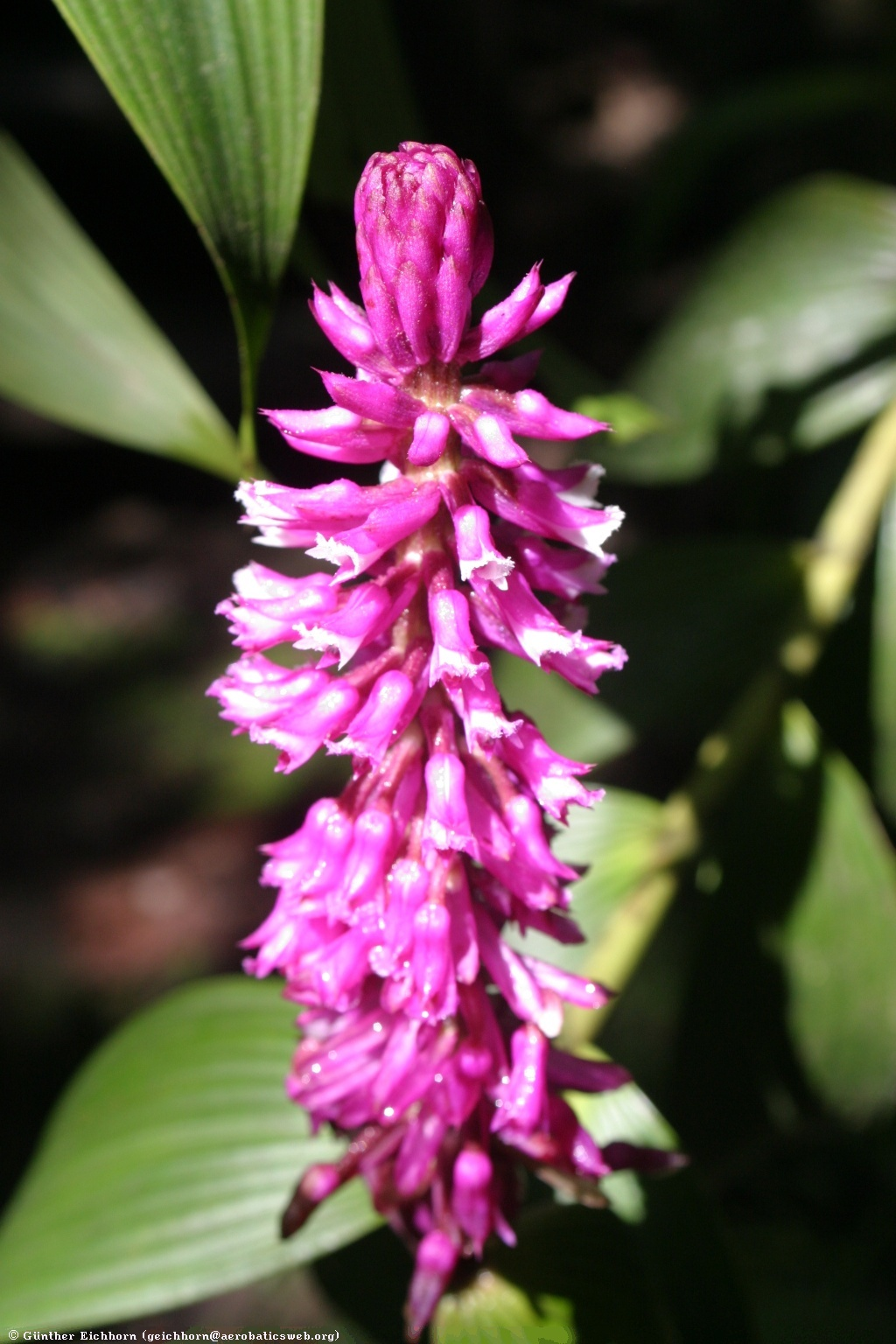

Scientific classification
- Kingdom: Plantae
- Clade: Tracheophytes
- Clade: Angiosperms
- Clade: Monocots
- Order: Asparagales
- Family: Orchidaceae
- Subfamily: Epidendroideae
- Genus: Elleanthus
- Species: E. robustus

Binomial name
- Elleanthus robustus Rchb. f.

Synonyms
- Evelyna robusta Rchb.f.

= Elleanthus robustus =

Species of orchid

Elleanthus robustus is a species of flowering plant from the orchid family, Orchidaceae.

Evelyna robusta is native to Colombia, Costa Rica, Ecuador, Peru and Venezuela
