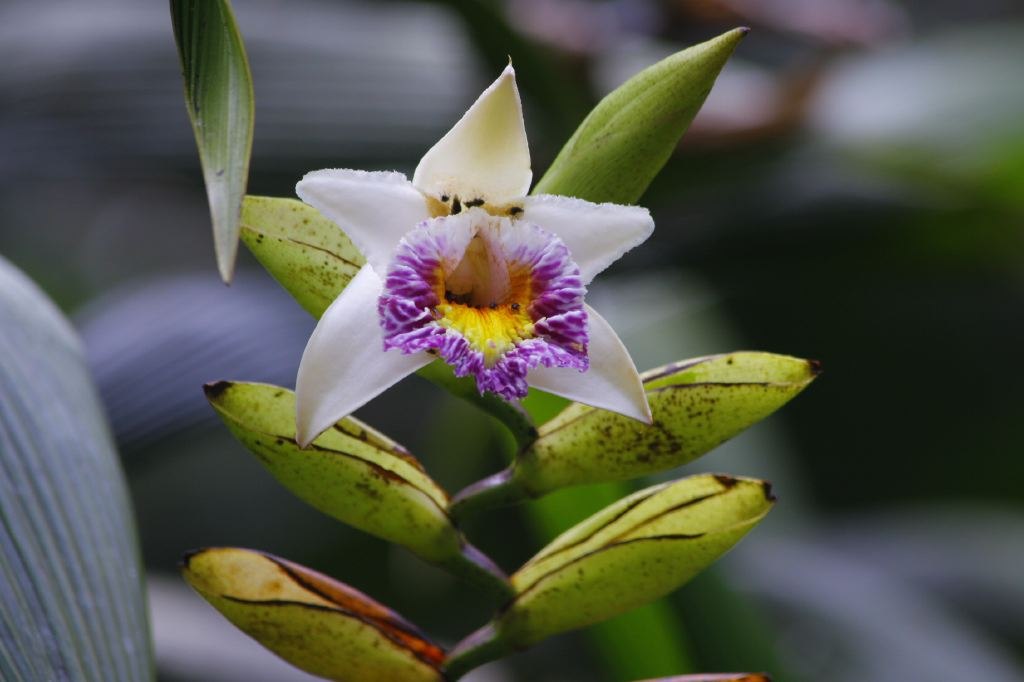

Scientific classification
- Kingdom: Plantae
- Clade: Tracheophytes
- Clade: Angiosperms
- Clade: Monocots
- Order: Asparagales
- Family: Orchidaceae
- Subfamily: Epidendroideae
- Genus: Sobralia
- Species: S. luerorum

Binomial name
- Sobralia luerorum Dodson 1998

= Sobralia luerorum =

Species of orchid

Sobralia luerorum is a species of Sobralia.

== Distribution ==
Plants are found growing epiphytic or terrestrially in Azuay, Napo, Tungurahua province of Ecuador and Antioquia state of Colombia at elevations around 1500 to 2200 meters.

== Taxonomy ==
This species was first collected by Calaway H. Dodson, P. Dodson, Carlyle A. Luer, and Jane P. Luer on March 9, 1985 in Azuay, Ecuador. The plant was later described in 1998 in Orquideologia.
