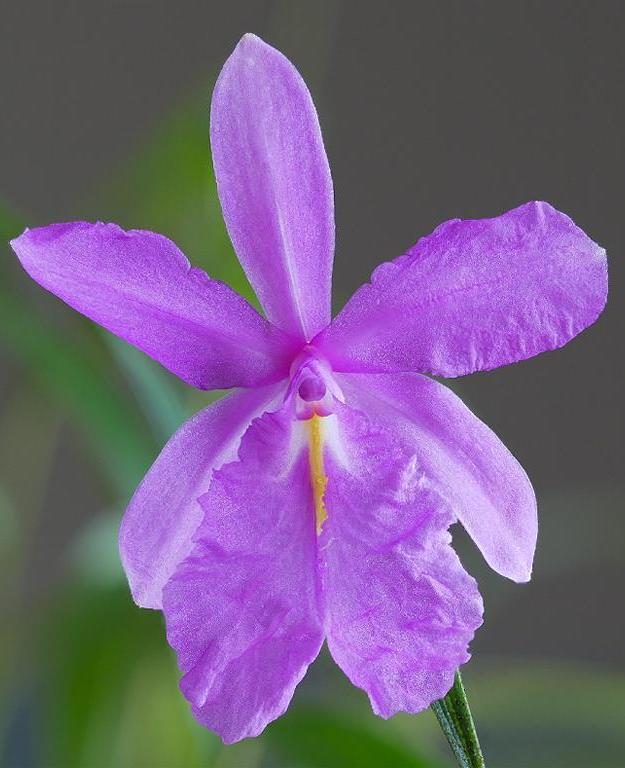

Scientific classification
- Kingdom: Plantae
- Clade: Tracheophytes
- Clade: Angiosperms
- Clade: Monocots
- Order: Asparagales
- Family: Orchidaceae
- Subfamily: Epidendroideae
- Genus: Sobralia
- Species: S. callosa

Binomial name
- Sobralia callosa L.O.Williams 1946

Synonyms
- Lindsayella amabilis Ames & C.Schweinf. 1937

= Sobralia callosa =

Species of orchid

Sobralia callosa is a species of Sobralia.

== Distribution ==
Plants are found growing in Panama and Colombia at elevations around 650 to 800 meters. Plants are pollinated by hummingbirds.
