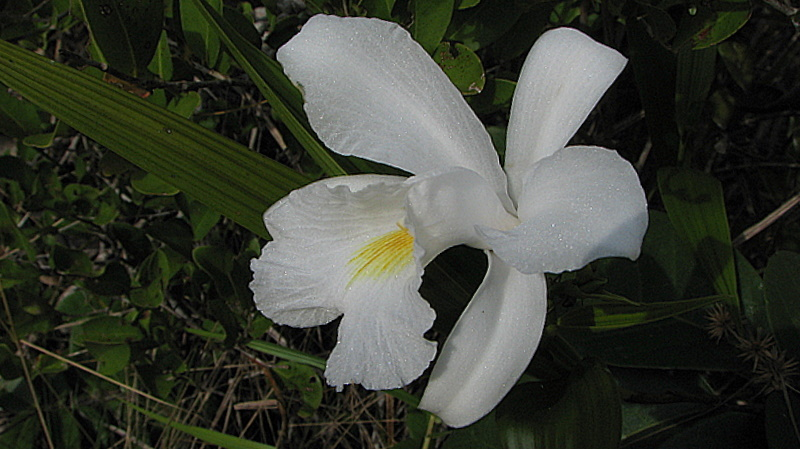

Scientific classification
- Kingdom: Plantae
- Clade: Tracheophytes
- Clade: Angiosperms
- Clade: Monocots
- Order: Asparagales
- Family: Orchidaceae
- Subfamily: Epidendroideae
- Genus: Sobralia
- Species: S. liliastrum

Binomial name
- Sobralia liliastrum Lindl. 1833

Synonyms
- Cattleya liliastrum (Lindl.) Beer 1854; Epidendrum liliastrum Salzm. ex Lindl. 1833; Sobralia liliastrum var. alba Lindl. 1854; Sobralia liliastrum f. maior Hoehne 1912; Sobralia liliastrum var. rosea Lindl. 1854

= Sobralia liliastrum =

Species of orchid

Sobralia liliastrum is a species of Sobralia.

== Distribution ==
Plants are found growing in Colombia, Venezuela, French Guiana, Guyana, Suriname, Peru, Bolivia and Brazil at elevations around 700 to 2255 meters
