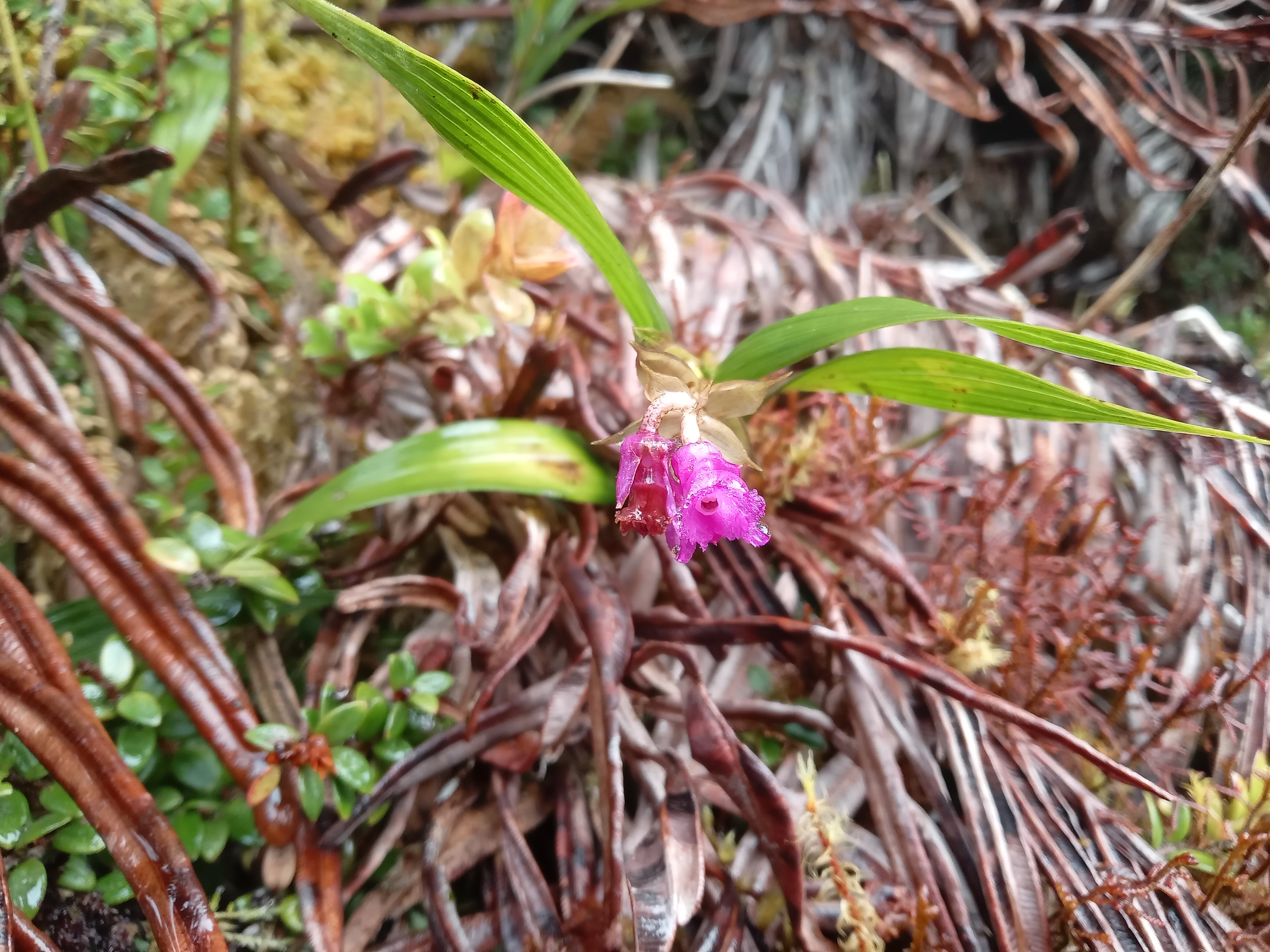

Scientific classification
- Kingdom: Plantae
- Clade: Tracheophytes
- Clade: Angiosperms
- Clade: Monocots
- Order: Asparagales
- Family: Orchidaceae
- Subfamily: Epidendroideae
- Genus: Elleanthus
- Species: E. tricallosus

Binomial name
- Elleanthus tricallosus Ames & C.Schweinf.

= Elleanthus tricallosus =

Species of flowering plant

Elleanthus tricallosus is a species of flowering plant within the orchid family.

== Description ==
Elleanthus tricallosus is a small or medium-sized orchid. It has slender stems, basal leaves, and a dark pink inflorescence.

== Range ==
Endemic to Costa Rica, it can be found at 1100 to 2600 meters elevations.

== Habitat ==
It lives in premontane rainforests, oak forests, and cloud forests.
