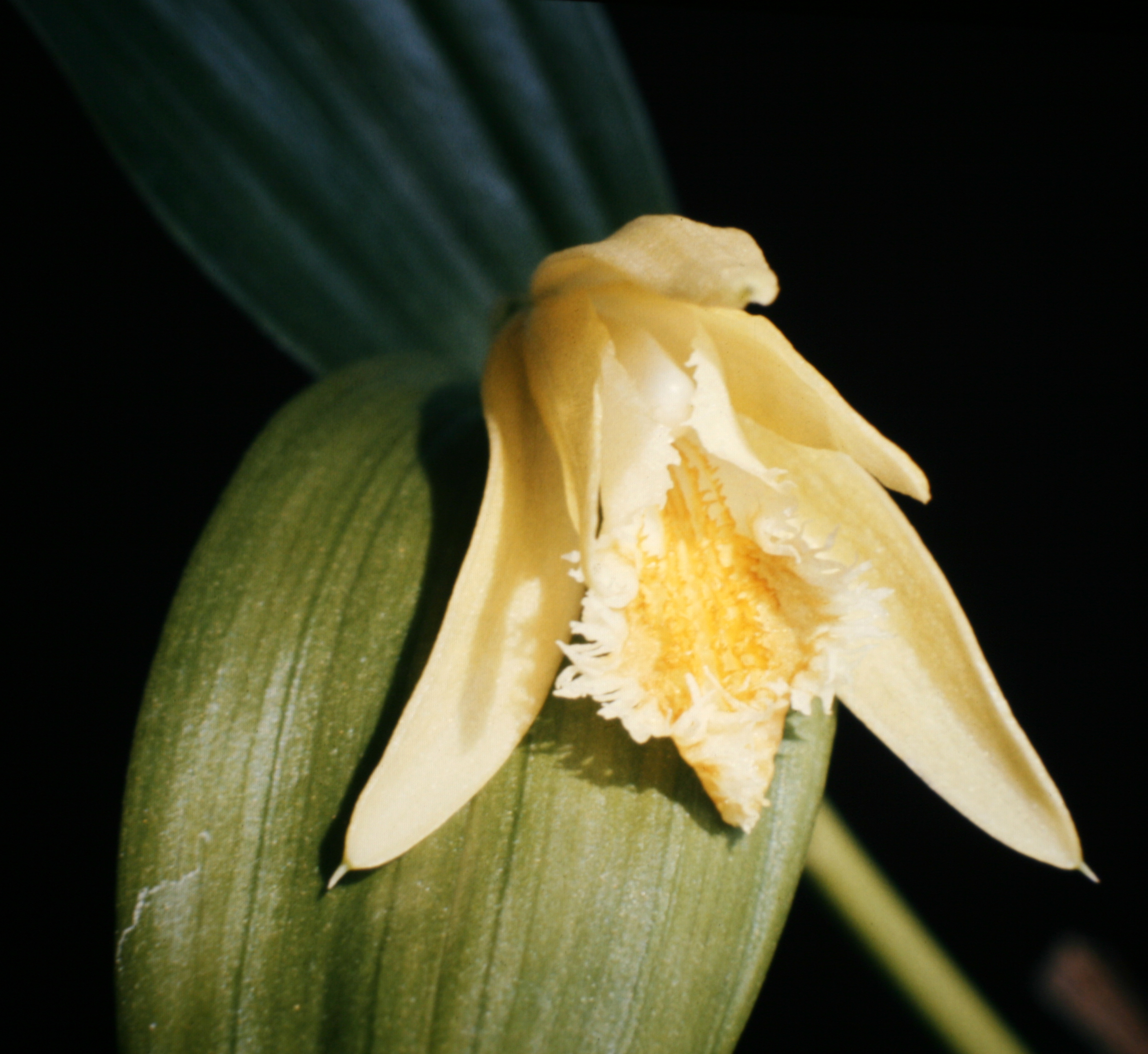
- Flower of Sobralia fragrans

Scientific classification
- Kingdom: Plantae
- Clade: Tracheophytes
- Clade: Angiosperms
- Clade: Monocots
- Order: Asparagales
- Family: Orchidaceae
- Subfamily: Epidendroideae
- Genus: Sobralia
- Species: S. fragrans

Binomial name
- Sobralia fragrans Lindl.

Synonyms
- Sobralia eublepharis Rchb.f. ex Kraenzl.

= Sobralia fragrans =

Fragrant sobralia

Species of orchid

Sobralia fragrans, commonly known as the fragrant sobralia, is a species of orchid found from Mexico to tropical South America.
