= Sobralia altissima =

Scientific classification
- Kingdom: Plantae
- Clade: Tracheophytes
- Clade: Angiosperms
- Clade: Monocots
- Order: Asparagales
- Family: Orchidaceae
- Subfamily: Epidendroideae
- Genus: Sobralia
- Species: S. altissima

Binomial name
- Sobralia altissima D.E. Benn. & Christenson

Species of plant

Sobralia altissima (Common name Inquil) is a species of orchid endemic to Huancavelica Department, Peru. It holds the record for tallest cane-like (ie non-vining) orchid species, with stems up to 13.4 m (44 feet) tall. with the self-supporting canes not over two inches (five centimeters) thick. This is the most tree-like orchid to be discovered to date. The six-inch (fifteen centimeter) wide purple flowers have white tips on their petals. The species was discovered in 1999 by Benjamin Collantes and Marco Leon.
