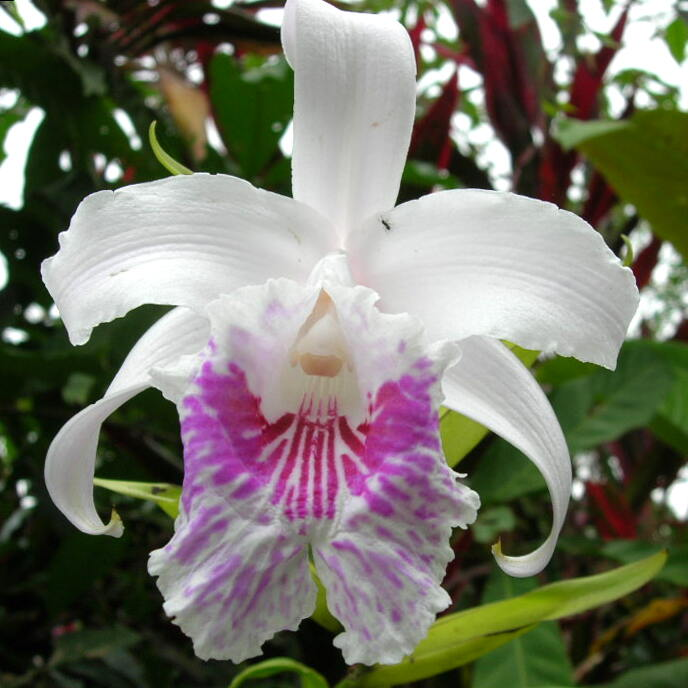
- Plant of Sobralia rosea

Scientific classification
- Kingdom: Plantae
- Clade: Tracheophytes
- Clade: Angiosperms
- Clade: Monocots
- Order: Asparagales
- Family: Orchidaceae
- Subfamily: Epidendroideae
- Genus: Sobralia
- Species: S. rosea

Binomial name
- Sobralia rosea Poepp. & Endl.

Synonyms
- Sobralia ruckeri Linden ex Lindl. 1851; Sobralia lindenii Mast. 1895

= Sobralia rosea =

Species of plant

Sobralia rosea, is a species of orchid native to Colombia, Ecuador and Peru.
