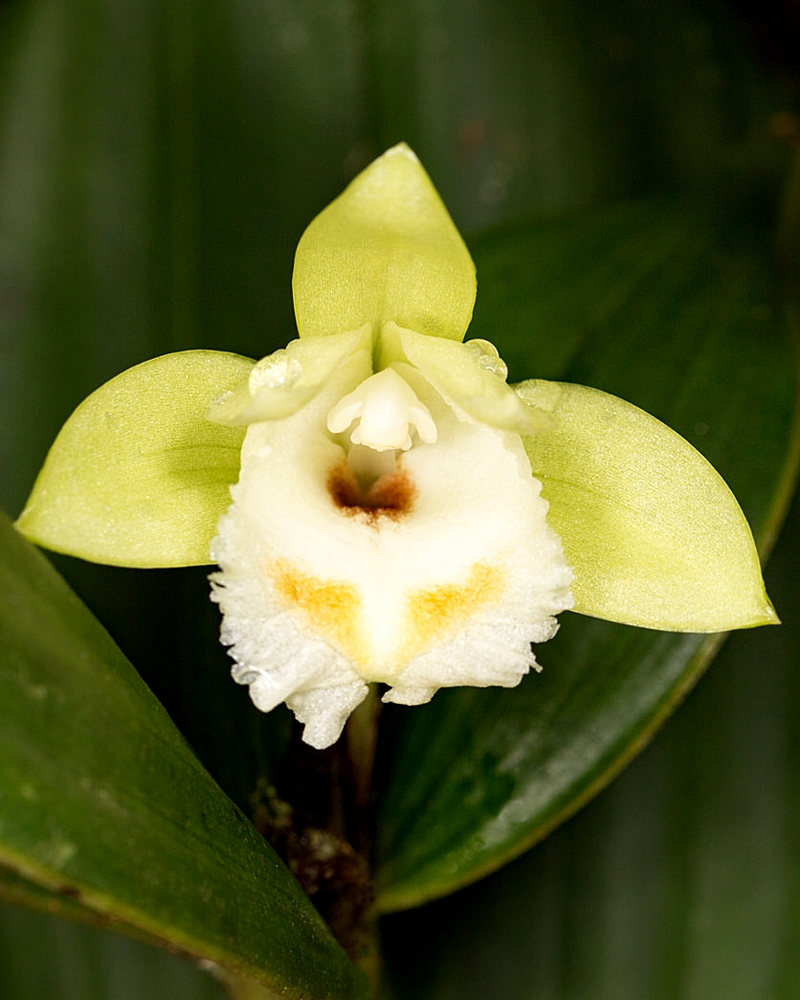

Scientific classification
- Kingdom: Plantae
- Clade: Tracheophytes
- Clade: Angiosperms
- Clade: Monocots
- Order: Asparagales
- Family: Orchidaceae
- Subfamily: Epidendroideae
- Genus: Sobralia
- Species: S. bimaculata

Binomial name
- Sobralia bimaculata Garay 1975

= Sobralia bimaculata =

Species of orchid

Sobralia bimaculata is a species of Sobralia. Chromosome count is 2n = 44

== Distribution ==
Plants are found growing in Colombia (Antioquia) and Ecuador (Azuay) at elevations of 1850 to 2000 meters.
