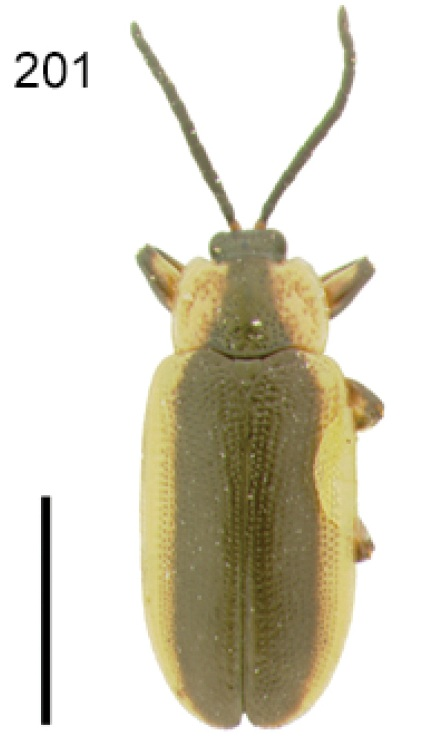

Scientific classification
- Kingdom: Animalia
- Phylum: Arthropoda
- Class: Insecta
- Order: Coleoptera
- Suborder: Polyphaga
- Infraorder: Cucujiformia
- Family: Chrysomelidae
- Genus: Cephaloleia
- Species: C. orchideivora

Binomial name
- Cephaloleia orchideivora Sekerka, Windsor & Staines, 2013

= Cephaloleia orchideivora =

Species of beetle

Cephaloleia orchideivora is a species of beetle of the family Chrysomelidae. It is found in Panama.

== Description ==
Adults reach a length of about 5.5–6.9 mm. The head is metallic olive-green with bluish-violet reflection and the antennae (except for the basal antennomere which is rust-colored) are black. The pronotum is yellow (in dry specimens) to pink (in live specimens) with a medial black triangular marking from the base to the apex. The elytron is brownish or yellow with a broad olive-green marking from the base to the apex. The legs are black on the upper surface and yellowish on the lower surface.

== Biology ==
The recorded host plants for this species are Elleanthus species, Epidendrum werklei, Oerstedella exasperata and Oerstedella wallisii.
