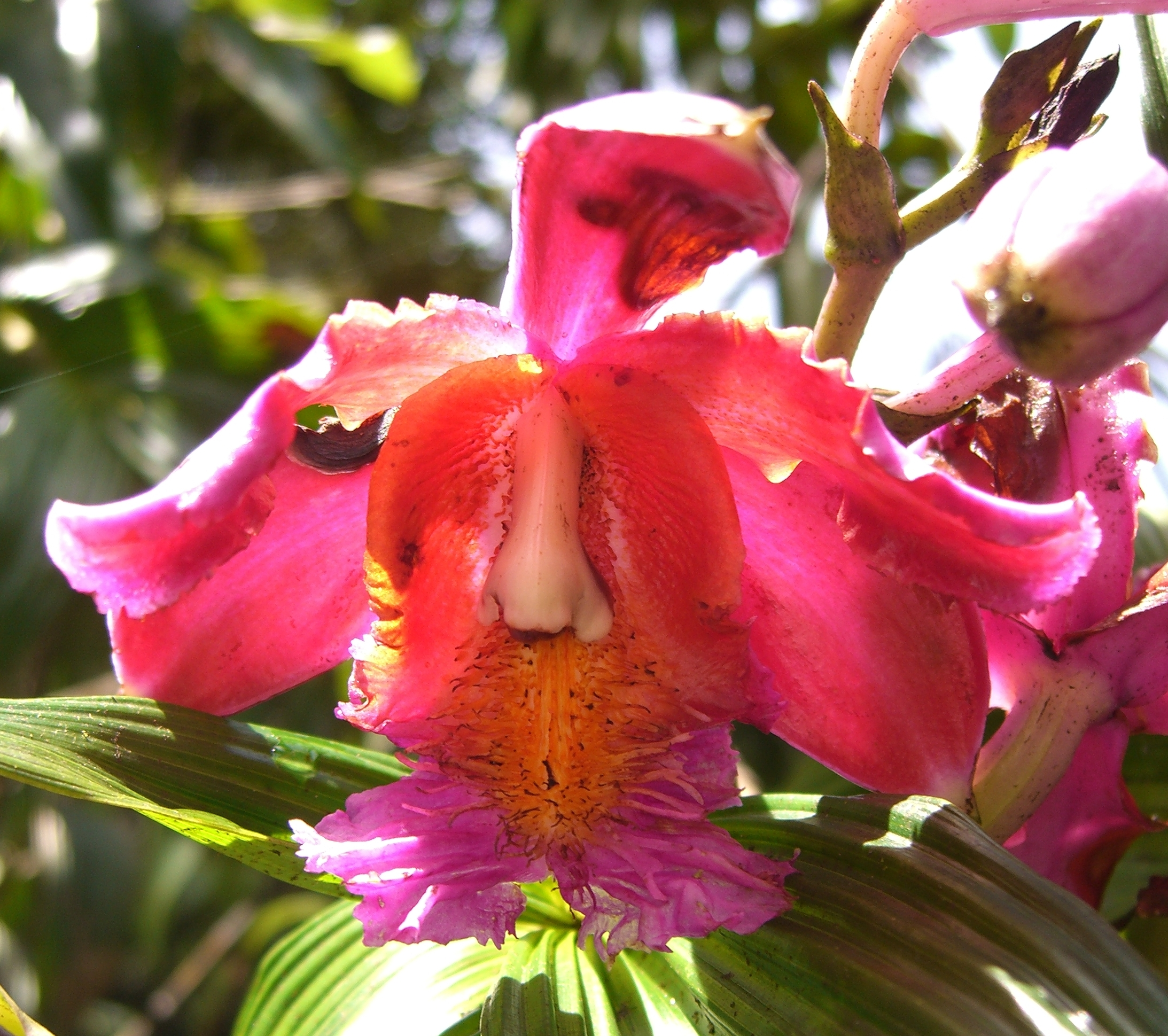
- Flower of Sobralia dichotoma

Scientific classification
- Kingdom: Plantae
- Clade: Tracheophytes
- Clade: Angiosperms
- Clade: Monocots
- Order: Asparagales
- Family: Orchidaceae
- Subfamily: Epidendroideae
- Genus: Sobralia
- Species: S. dichotoma

Binomial name
- Sobralia dichotoma Ruiz & Pav.

Synonyms
- Brasolia dichotoma (Ruiz & Pav.) Baranow, Dudek & Szlach.; Cattleya dichotoma (Ruiz & Pav.) Beer; Cattleya tichotoma Beer; Sobralia mandonii Rchb.f.; Sobralia mandonii f. coerulea Christenson

= Sobralia dichotoma =

Species of plant

Sobralia dichotoma, is a species of flowering plant in the family Orchidaceae. It is native to Colombia, Ecuador, Peru and Bolivia.
