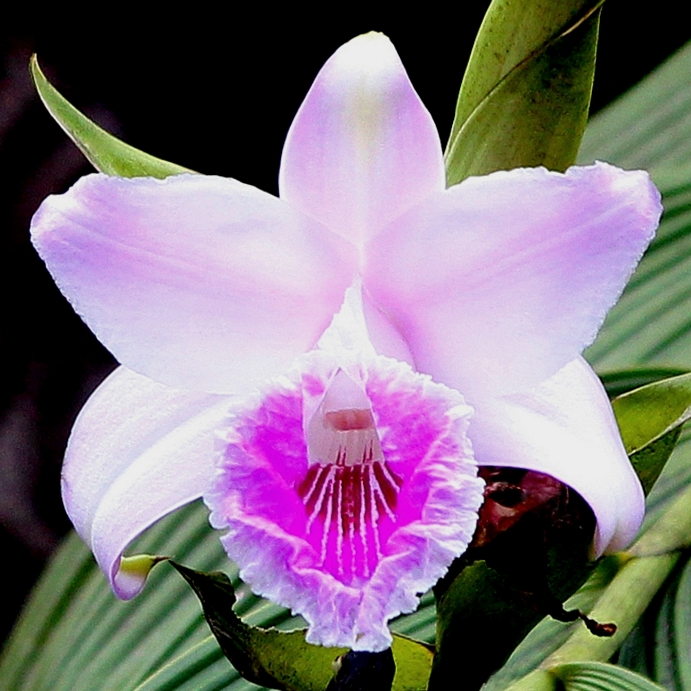

Scientific classification
- Kingdom: Plantae
- Clade: Tracheophytes
- Clade: Angiosperms
- Clade: Monocots
- Order: Asparagales
- Family: Orchidaceae
- Subfamily: Epidendroideae
- Genus: Sobralia
- Species: S. pulcherrima

Binomial name
- Sobralia pulcherrima Garay 1978

Synonyms
- Sobralia lindenii W.Watson 1895

= Sobralia pulcherrima =

Species of orchid

Sobralia pulcherrima is a species of Sobralia.

== Distribution ==
Plants are found growing lowland forest edges in Valle del Cauca, Nariño, Antioquia, Chocó states of Colombia and Pichincha, Carchi, Imbabura, and Cotopaxi provinces of Ecuador at elevations between 500 and 2000 meters

== Taxonomy ==
This species was first collected in Pichincha, Ecuador by G. Harling and L. Andersson and published in Flora of Ecuador by Garay in 1978.
