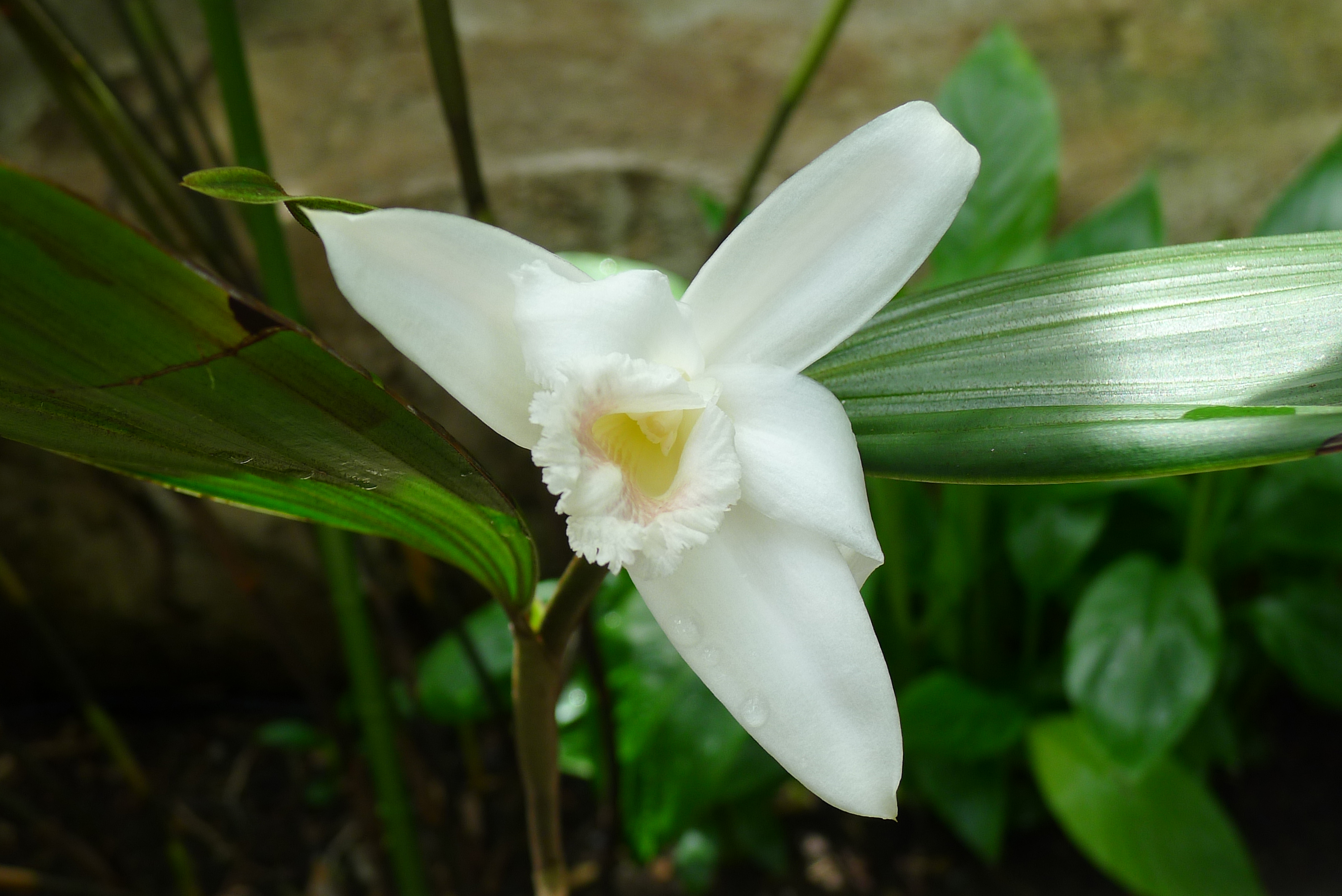
- Flower of Sobralia setigera

Scientific classification
- Kingdom: Plantae
- Clade: Tracheophytes
- Clade: Angiosperms
- Clade: Monocots
- Order: Asparagales
- Family: Orchidaceae
- Subfamily: Epidendroideae
- Genus: Sobralia
- Species: S. setigera

Binomial name
- Sobralia setigera Poepp. & Endl.

= Sobralia setigera =

Species of plant

Sobralia setigera, is a species of orchid native to Peru, with snow-white flowers that are about 2 in (51 mm) long.
