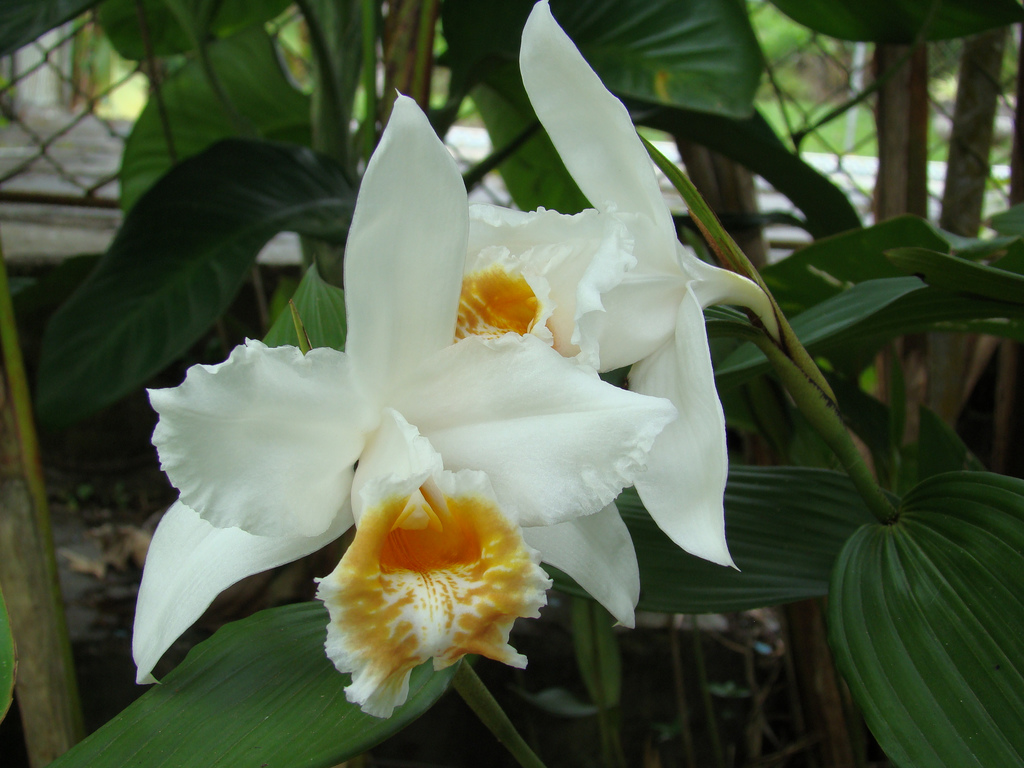

Scientific classification
- Kingdom: Plantae
- Clade: Tracheophytes
- Clade: Angiosperms
- Clade: Monocots
- Order: Asparagales
- Family: Orchidaceae
- Subfamily: Epidendroideae
- Genus: Sobralia
- Species: S. chrysostoma

Binomial name
- Sobralia chrysostoma Dressler 2001

= Sobralia chrysostoma =

Species of orchid

Sobralia chrysostoma is a species of Sobralia.

== Distribution ==
Plants are found growing in Costa Rica, Nicaragua, and Panama at elevations of 20 to 1050 meters.

== Taxonomy ==
This species was first collected in July 16, 199 by Robert Dressler from Alajuela, Costa Rica. It was later described in the American Orchid Society's Orchids magazine in 2001. The epithet chrysostoma refers to the golden color lip of the flowers.
