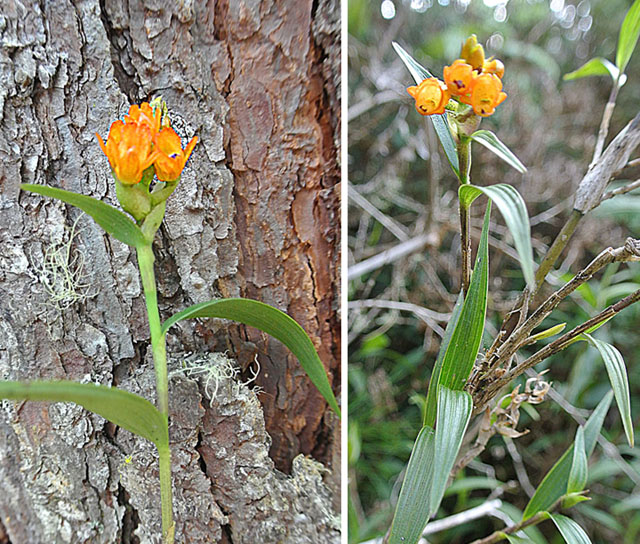

Scientific classification
- Kingdom: Plantae
- Clade: Tracheophytes
- Clade: Angiosperms
- Clade: Monocots
- Order: Asparagales
- Family: Orchidaceae
- Subfamily: Epidendroideae
- Genus: Elleanthus
- Species: E. aurantiacus

Binomial name
- Elleanthus aurantiacus (Lindl.) Rchb. f.

= Elleanthus aurantiacus =

Species of orchid

Ellianthus aurantiacus is an orchid (family Orchidaceae) native from Costa Rica to Peru. It is unique among orchids in being a shrub with repeated orders of branching. The plant gets about three feet (0.9 meters) in height and not quite as wide.

The species was described in 1863 by the botanist Heinrich Gustav Reichenbach as a part of the Wilhelm Gerhard Walpers work Annales Botanices Systematicae. The basionym is Evelyna aurantiaca as described by John Lindley in 1845.

This epiphytic plant is mostly found in wet tropical biomes from Nicaragua in the north through the rest of Central America including Nicaragua, Costa Rica, Honduras and Panama. The range extends into northern South America including Colombia, Venezuela, Bolivia and Peru in the south.
