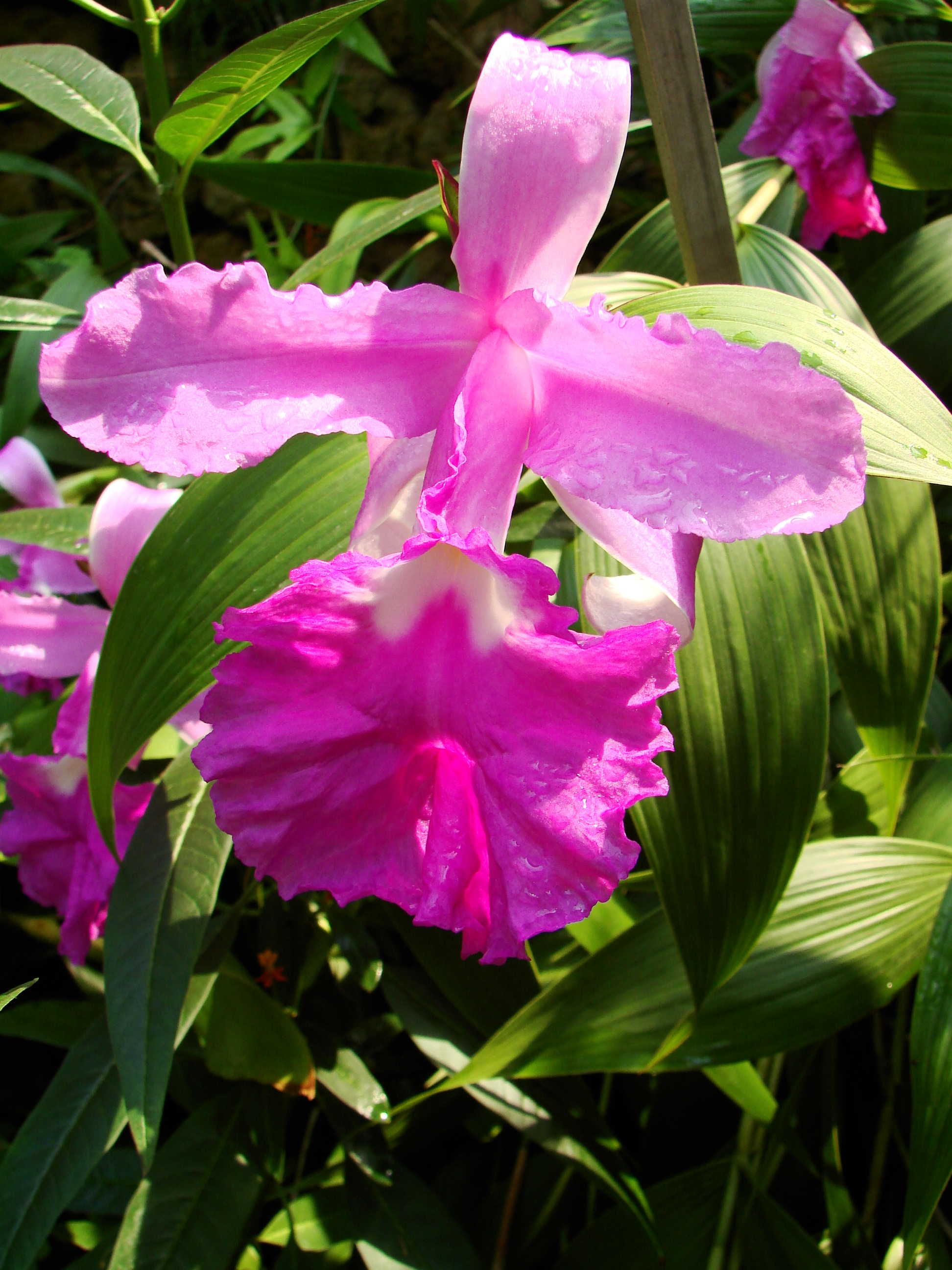
- Sobralia macrantha

Scientific classification
- Kingdom: Plantae
- Clade: Embryophytes
- Clade: Tracheophytes
- Clade: Angiosperms
- Clade: Monocots
- Order: Asparagales
- Family: Orchidaceae
- Subfamily: Epidendroideae
- Tribe: Sobralieae
- Genus: Sobralia; Ruiz & Pav.

Type species
- Sobralia biflora Ruiz & Pav.

Species
- See text

Synonyms
- Cyathoglottis Poepp. & Endl.; Fregea Rchb.f.; Lindsayella Ames & C.Schweinf.

= Sobralia =

Genus of orchids

Sobralia is a genus of orchids native to Mexico, Central and South America. The plants are more commonly terrestrial, but are also found growing epiphytically, in wet forests from sea level to about 8,800 ft. The genus was named for Dr. Francisco Sobral, a Spanish botanist. The genus is abbreviated Sob in trade journals.

Their reed-like stems range in height from about 1 ft (33 cm) (such as in Sobralia galeottiana) to 44 ft. (13.4 m) (in Sobralia altissima). They have typically heavily veined, bilobed, plicate, apical leaves all along the stem. The inflorescences on the apex of the stem carry one or two successive ephemeral flowers with large sepals and petals. The short duration of the flower is caused by a self-digesting enzyme. The lip is entire or lobed and clasps the column at its base. This columns carries eight soft pollinia. These flowers range in color from pure white to yellow, green, pink, purple, red, brown, and even a blue violet.

== Taxonomy ==
The following species are recognized:

- Sobralia aerata (C.K.Allen & L.O.Williams) Garay
- Sobralia allenii L.O.Williams
- Sobralia altissima D.E.Benn. & Christenson
- Sobralia amabilis (Rchb.f.) L.O.Williams
- Sobralia anceps Schltr.
- Sobralia andreae Dressler
- Sobralia antioquiensis Schltr.
- Sobralia aspera Dressler & Pupulin
- Sobralia atropubescens Ames & C.Schweinf.
- Sobralia augusta Hoehne.
- Sobralia aurantiaca Linden & Rchb.f.
- Sobralia biflora Ruiz & Pav.
- Sobralia bimaculata Garay
- Sobralia blancoi Dressler & Pupulin
- Sobralia bletiae Rchb.f.
- Sobralia boliviensis Schltr.
- Sobralia buchtienii Schltr.
- Sobralia calliantha D.E.Benn. & Christenson
- Sobralia callosa L.O.Williams
- Sobralia caloglossa Schltr.
- Sobralia candida (Poepp. & Endl.) Rchb.f.
- Sobralia carazoi Lank. & Ames
- Sobralia cardosoi Campacci & J.B.F.Silva
- Sobralia cataractarum Hoehne
- Sobralia cattleya Rchb.f.
- Sobralia chatoensis A.H.Heller & A.D.Hawkes
- Sobralia chrysantha Lindl.
- Sobralia chrysoleuca Rchb.f.
- Sobralia chrysostoma Dressler
- Sobralia ciliata (C.Presl) C.Schweinf. ex Foldats
- Sobralia citrea Dressler
- Sobralia crispissima Dressler
- Sobralia crocea (Poepp. & Endl.) Rchb.f.
- Sobralia decora Bateman
- Sobralia densifoliata Schltr.
- Sobralia dichotoma Ruiz & Pav.
- Sobralia dissimilis Dressler
- Sobralia dorbignyana Rchb.f.
- Sobralia doremiliae Dressler
- Sobralia ecuadorana Dodson
- Sobralia exigua Dressler
- Sobralia exilis Schltr.
- Sobralia fimbriata Poepp. & Endl.
- Sobralia fragilis Dressler & Bogarín
- Sobralia fragrans Lindl.
- Sobralia fruticetorum Schltr.
- Sobralia fuzukiae Dressler & Bogarín
- Sobralia galeottiana A.Rich.
- Sobralia gentryi Dodson
- Sobralia gloriana Dressler
- Sobralia gloriosa Rchb.f.
- Sobralia granitica G.A.Romero & Carnevali
- Sobralia hagsateri Dodson
- Sobralia hawkesii A.H.Heller
- Sobralia helleri A.D.Hawkes
- Sobralia herzogii Schltr.
- Sobralia hirta D.E.Benn. & Christenson
- Sobralia hirtzii Dodson
- Sobralia hoppii Schltr.
- Sobralia imavieirae Campacci & J.B.F.Silva
- Sobralia infundibuligera Garay & Dunst.
- Sobralia kermesina Garay
- Sobralia kerryae Dressler
- Sobralia klotzscheana Rchb.f.
- Sobralia kruskayae Dressler
- Sobralia labiata Warsz. & Rchb.f.
- Sobralia lancea Garay
- Sobralia leucoxantha Rchb.f.
- Sobralia liliastrum Lindl.
- Sobralia lindleyana Rchb.f.
- Sobralia lowii Rolfe
- Sobralia luerorum Dodson
- Sobralia luteola Rolfe
- Sobralia macdougallii Soto Arenas Pérez-García & Salazar
- Sobralia macra Schltr.
- Sobralia macrantha Lindl.
- Sobralia macrophylla Rchb.f.
- Sobralia madisonii Dodson
- Sobralia maduroi Dressler
- Sobralia malmiana Pabst
- Sobralia malmquistiana Schltr.
- Sobralia margaritae Pabst
- Sobralia mariannae Dressler
- Sobralia mucronata Ames & C.Schweinf.
- Sobralia mutisii P.Ortiz
- Sobralia neudeckeri Dodson
- Sobralia nutans Dressler
- Sobralia odorata Schltr.
- Sobralia oliva-estevae Carnevali & I.Ramírez
- Sobralia oroana Dodson
- Sobralia paludosa Linden
- Sobralia paradisiaca Rchb.f.
- Sobralia pardalina Garay
- Sobralia parviflora L.O.Williams
- Sobralia persimilis Garay
- Sobralia pfavii Schltr.
- Sobralia piedadiae Dodson
- Sobralia portillae Christenson
- Sobralia powellii Schltr.
- Sobralia pulcherrima Garay
- Sobralia pumila Rolfe
- Sobralia purpurea Dressler
- Sobralia purpurella Dressler & Bogarín
- Sobralia quinata Dressler
- Sobralia rarae-avis Dressler
- Sobralia recta Dressler
- Sobralia rhizophorae Cornejo & Dodson
- Sobralia rigidissima Linden ex Rchb.f.
- Sobralia roezlii Rchb.f.
- Sobralia rogersiana Christenson
- Sobralia rolfeana Schltr.
- Sobralia rondonii Hoehne
- Sobralia rosea Poepp. & Endl.
- Sobralia roseoalba Rchb.f.
- Sobralia ruckeri Linden & Rchb.f.
- Sobralia ruparupaensis D.E.Benn. & Christenson
- Sobralia rupicola Kraenzl.
- Sobralia sancti-josephi Kraenzl.
- Sobralia sanctorum Dressler & Bogarín
- Sobralia sanfelicis Dressler
- Sobralia schultzei Schltr.
- Sobralia scopulorum Rchb.f.
- Sobralia semperflorens Kraenzl.
- Sobralia setigera Poepp. & Endl.
- Sobralia sobralioides (Kraenzl.) Garay
- Sobralia sororcula Dressler
- Sobralia sotoana Dressler & Bogarín
- Sobralia speciosa C.Schweinf.
- Sobralia splendida Schltr.
- Sobralia stenophylla Lindl.
- Sobralia stevensonii Dodson
- Sobralia tamboana Dodson
- Sobralia theobromina Dressler
- Sobralia tricolor Dressler
- Sobralia turkeliae Christenson
- Sobralia undatocarinata C.Schweinf.
- Sobralia uribei P.Ortiz
- Sobralia valida Rolfe
- Sobralia violacea Linden ex Lindl.
- Sobralia virginalis Peeters & Cogn.
- Sobralia warszewiczii Rchb.f.
- Sobralia weberbaueriana Kraenzl.
- Sobralia wilsoniana Rolfe
- Sobralia withneri D.E.Benn. & Christenson
- Sobralia xantholeuca B.S.Williams
- Sobralia yauaperyensis Barb. Rodr.

== Hybrids ==
- Sobralia × intermedia P.H.Allen
- Sobralia × veitchii hort.

== Gallery ==
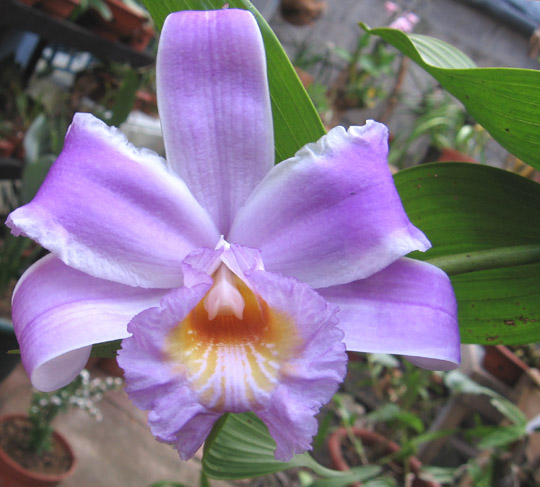
Sobralia decora

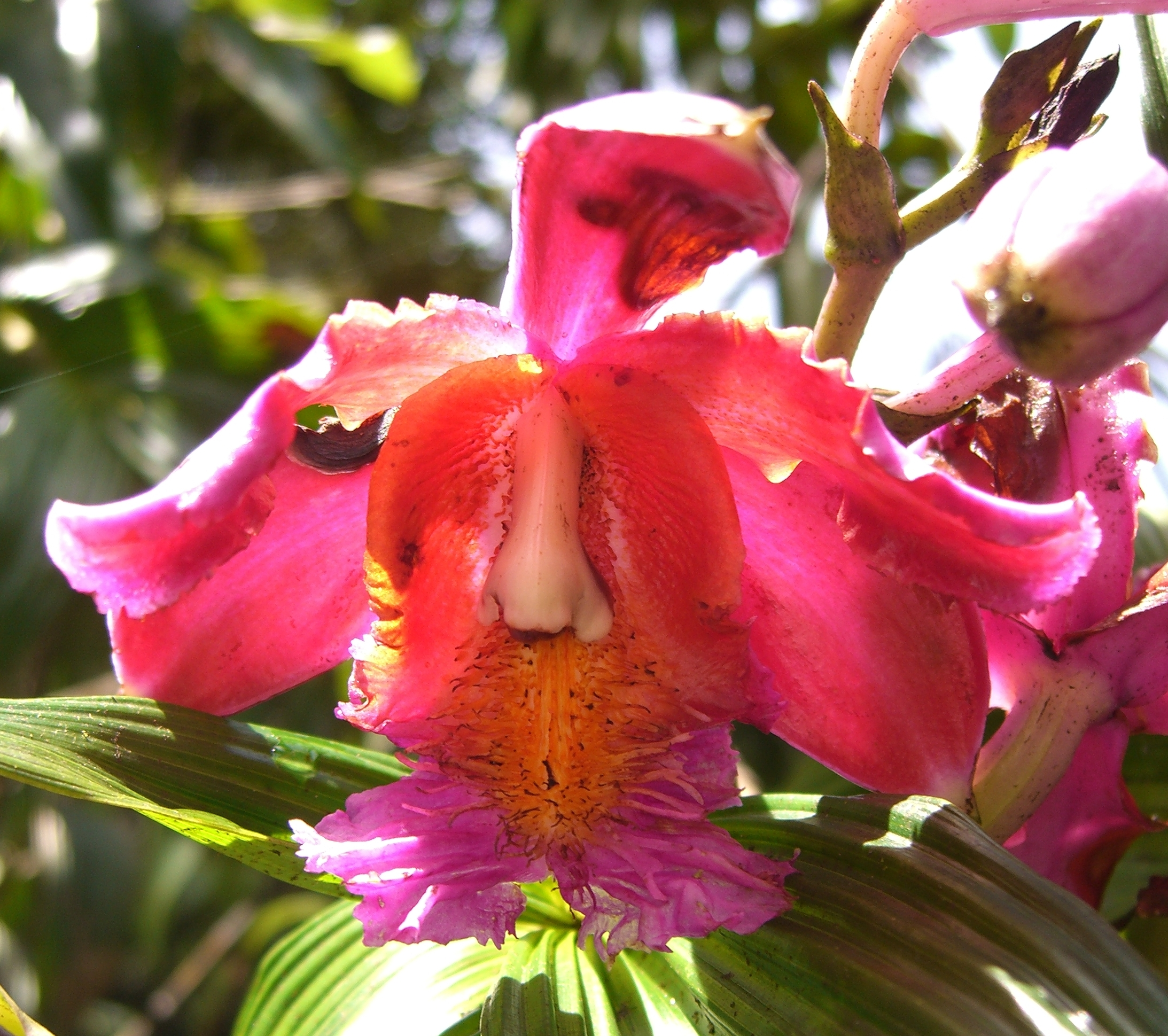
Sobralia dichotoma

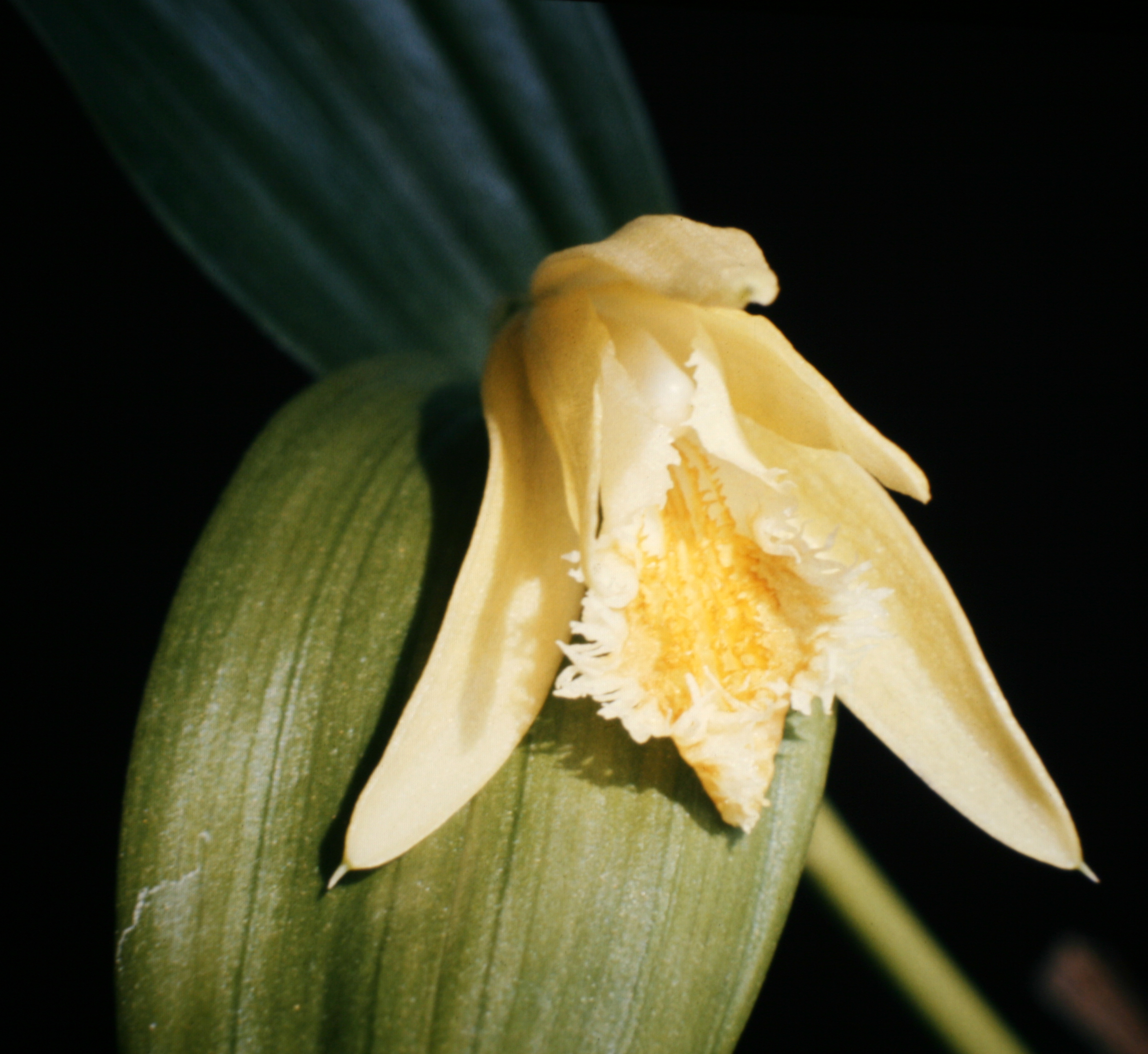
Sobralia fragrans

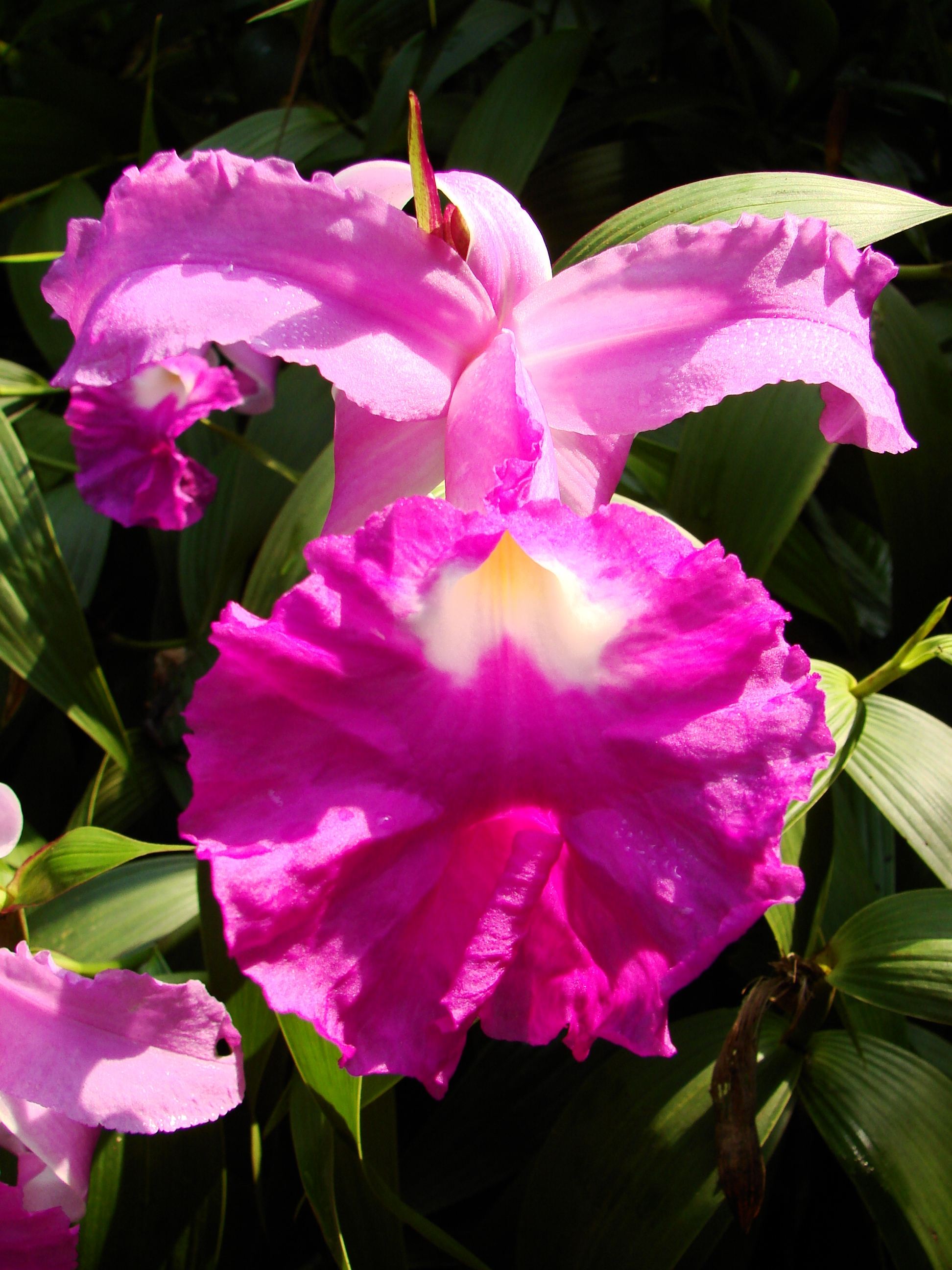
Sobralia macrantha

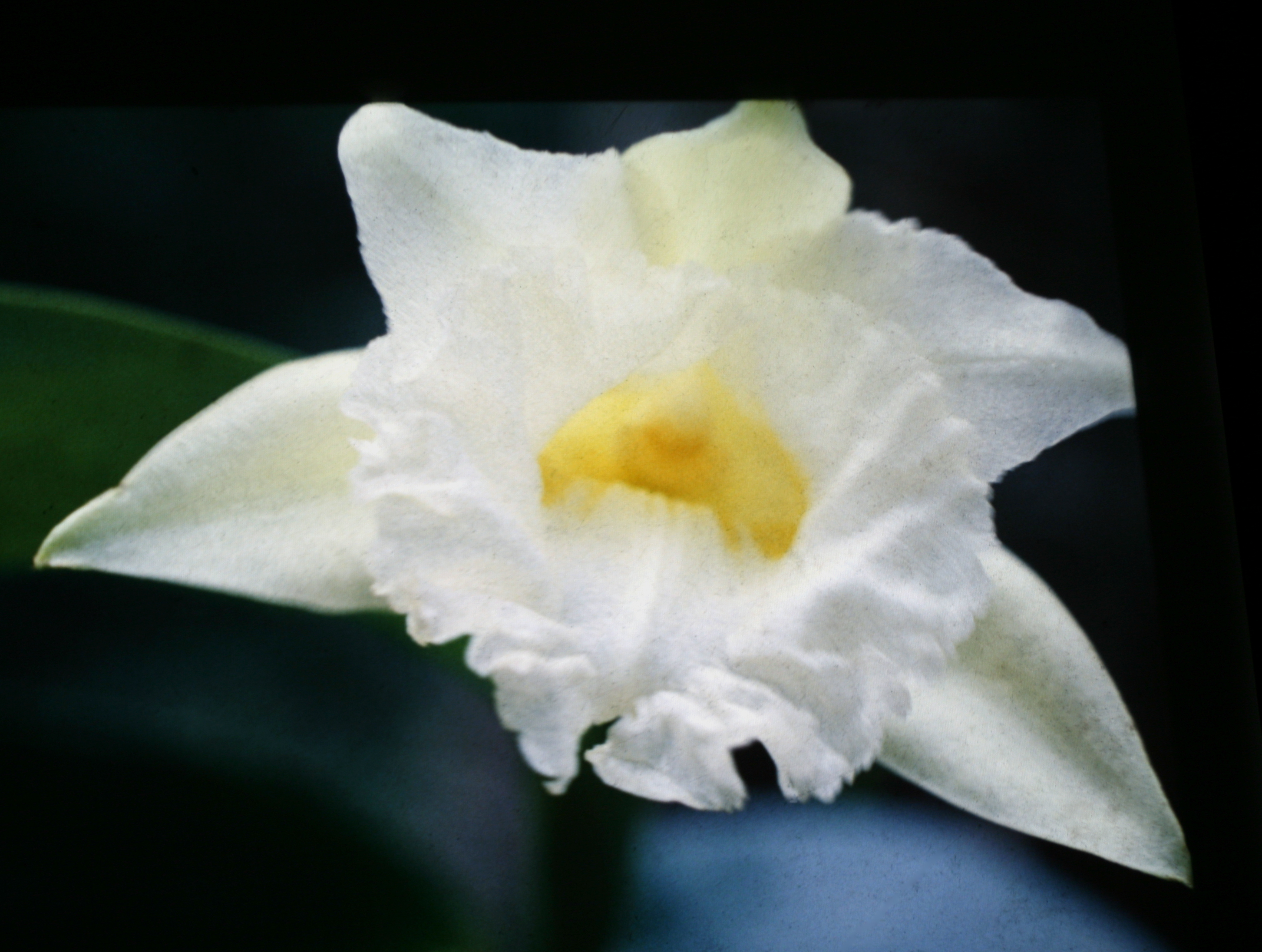
Sobralia macrophylla

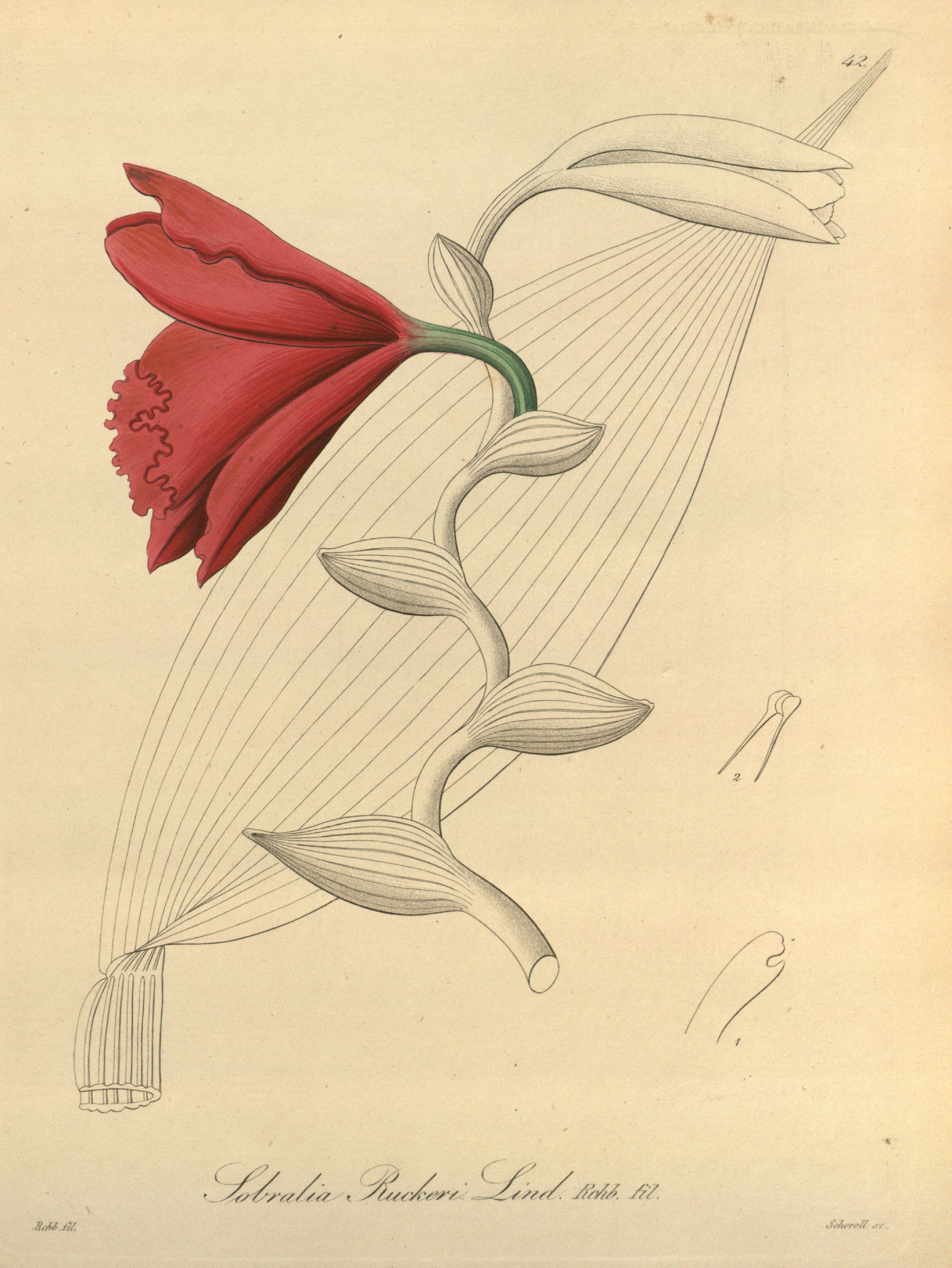
Sobralia ruckeri
