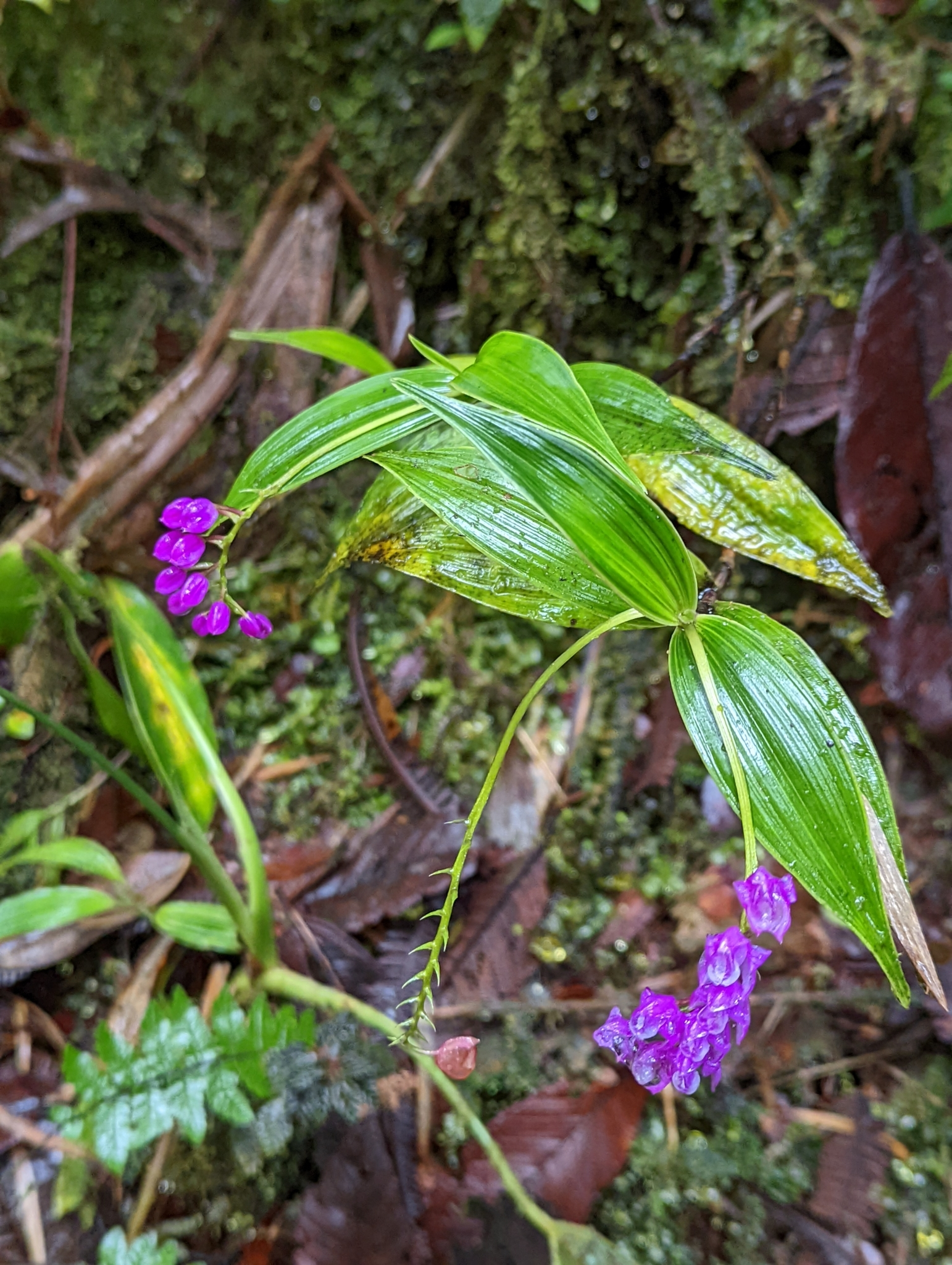
- Sertifera purpurea in Colombia

Scientific classification
- Kingdom: Plantae
- Clade: Tracheophytes
- Clade: Angiosperms
- Clade: Monocots
- Order: Asparagales
- Family: Orchidaceae
- Subfamily: Epidendroideae
- Tribe: Sobralieae
- Genus: Sertifera; Lindl. ex Rchb.f.

= Sertifera =

Genus of orchids

Sertifera is a genus of flowering plants from the orchid family, Orchidaceae, native to northwestern South America.

The following species are recognized as of June 2014:

- Sertifera aurantiaca C.Schweinf. - Colombia, Venezuela
- Sertifera colombiana Schltr. - Colombia, Venezuela
- Sertifera grandifolia L.O.Williams - Colombia
- Sertifera lehmanniana (Kraenzl.) Garay - Ecuador
- Sertifera major Schltr. - Colombia, Ecuador
- Sertifera parviflora Schltr. - Colombia, Ecuador
- Sertifera purpurea Lindl. & Rchb.f. - Colombia, Ecuador

== See also ==
- List of Orchidaceae genera
