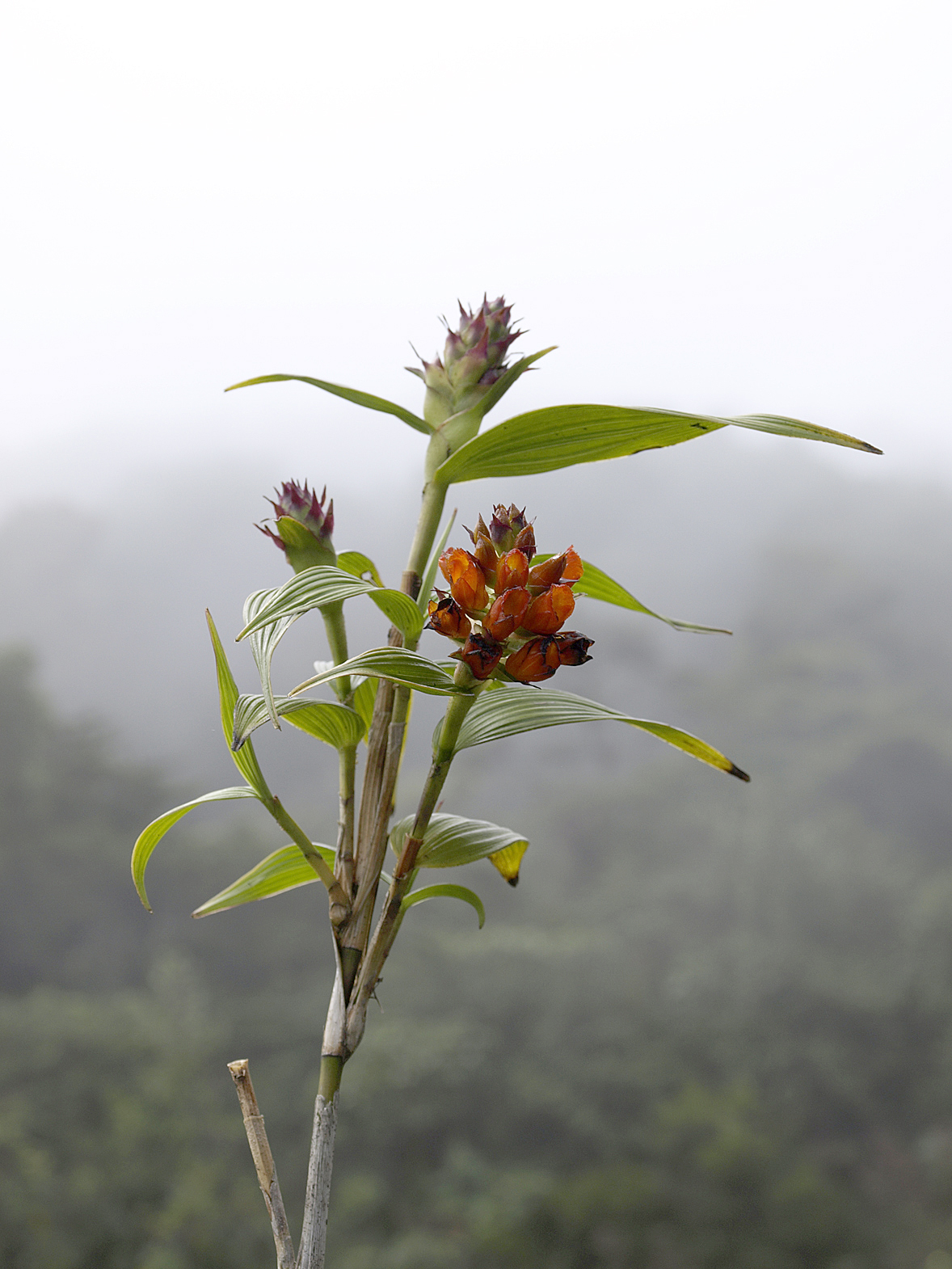

Scientific classification
- Kingdom: Plantae
- Clade: Tracheophytes
- Clade: Angiosperms
- Clade: Monocots
- Order: Asparagales
- Family: Orchidaceae
- Subfamily: Epidendroideae
- Tribe: Sobralieae
- Genus: Elleanthus; C.Presl

Synonyms
- Evelyna Poepp. & Endl.; Adeneleuterophora Barb.Rodr.; Adeneleuthera Kuntze in T.E.von Post; Epilyna Schltr.; Pseudelleanthus Brieger in F.R.R.Schlechter

= Elleanthus =

Genus of American tiger orchids

Elleanthus is a genus of flowering plants from the orchid family, Orchidaceae. They are commonly known as tiger orchid. All the species are native to the warmer parts of the Western Hemisphere (Mexico, Central America, South America, West Indies).

List of species in genus Elleanthus

- E. amethystinoides Garay
- E. amethystinus (Rchb.f. & Warsz.) Rchb.f.
- E. ampliflorus Schltr.
- E. aristatus Garay
- E. arpophyllostachys (Rchb.f.) Rchb.f.
- E. asplundii Garay
- E. aurantiacus (Lindl.) Rchb. f.
- E. aureus (Poepp. & Endl.) Rchb. f.
- E. auriculatus Garay
- E. bifarius Garay
- E. blatteus Garay
- E. bogotensis Schltr.
- E. bonplandii (Rchb. f.) Rchb. f.
- E. bradeorum Schltr.
- E. brasiliensis (Lindl.) Rchb.f.
- E. capitatellus Dressler
- E. capitatus (Poepp. & Endl.) Rchb. f.
- E. caravata (Aubl.) Rchb. f.
- E. caricoides Nash
- E. carinatus Dressler & Bogarmn
- E. caroli Schltr.
- E. caveroi D.E. Benn. & Christenson
- E. cinnabarinus Garay
- E. columnaris (Lindl.) Rchb. f.
- E. condorensis Dodson
- E. confusus Garay
- E. congestus Schltr.
- E. conifer (Rchb. f. & Warsz.) Rchb. f.
- E. cordidactylus Ackerman
- E. coriifolius (Rchb.f. ex Linden) Rchb.f.
- E. crinipes Rchb. f.
- E. decipiens Dressler
- E. discolor (Rchb. f. & Warsz.) Rchb. f.
- E. dussii Cogn.
- E. ecuadorensis Garay
- E. ensatus (Lindl.) Rchb. f.
- E. escobarii Dodson
- E. flavescens (Lindl.) Rchb.f.
- E. formosus Garay
- E. fractiflexus Schltr.
- E. furfuraceus (Lindl.) Rchb. f.
- E. gastroglottis Schltr.
- E. glaucophyllus Schltr.
- E. glomera Garay
- E. gracilis (Rchb. f.) Rchb. f.
- E. graminifolius (Barb. Rodr.) Lxjtnant
- E. grandiflorus Schltr.
- E. haematoxanthus (Rchb.f. ex Linden) Rchb.f.
- E. hirsutis Barringer
- E. hirtzii Dodson
- E. hookerianus (Barb. Rodr.) Garay
- E. hymenophorus (Rchb. f.) Rchb. f.
- E. isochiloides Lxjtnant
- E. jimenezii (Schltr.) C. Schweinf.
- E. kalbreyeri Garay
- E. kermesinus (Lindl.) Rchb. f.
- E. killipii Garay
- E. koehleri Schltr.
- E. laetus Schltr.
- E. lancifolius C. Presl
- E. lateralis Garay
- E. laxifoliatus Schltr.
- E. leiocaulon Schltr.
- E. lentii Barringer
- E. ligularis Dressler & Bogarmn
- E. linifolius C. Presl.
- E. longibracteatus (Lindl. ex Griseb.) Fawc.
- E. maculatus (Lindl.) Rchb. f.
- E. magnicallosus Garay
- E. malpighiiflorus Carnevali & G.A. Romero
- E. muscicola Schltr.
- E. myrosmatis (rchb.f.) Rchb.f.
- E. norae Garay & Dunst.
- E. oliganthus (Poepp. & Endl.) Rchb. f.
- E. pastoensis Schltr.
- E. petrogeiton Schltr.
- E. phorcophyllus Garay
- E. poiformis Schltr.
- E. porphyrocephalus Schltr.
- E. purpureus (Rchb. f.) Rchb. f.
- E. reichenbachianus Garay
- E. rhizomatosus Garay
- E. rhodolepis (Rchb. f.) Rchb. f.
- E. robustus (Rchb. f.) Rchb. f.
- E. roseus Schltr.
- E. ruizii (Rchb. f.) Rchb. f.
- E. scharfii Dodson
- E. scopula Schltr.
- E. setosus Schltr.
- E. smithii Schltr.
- E. sodiroi Schltr.
- E. sphaerocephalus Schltr.
- E. steyermarkii Barringer
- E. stolonifer Barringer
- E. strobilifer (Poepp. & Endl.) Rchb. f.
- E. tandapianus Dodson
- E. teotepecensis Soto Arenas
- E. tillandsioides Barringer
- E. tonduzii Schltr.
- E. tovarensis Ames
- E. tricallosus Ames & C. Schweinf.
- E. ventricosus Schltr.
- E. venustus Schltr.
- E. vernicosus Garay
- E. vinosus Schltr.
- E. virgatus (Rchb. f.) C. Schweinf.
- E. wageneri (Rchb. f.) Rchb. f.
- E. wallnoeferi Szlach.
- E. weberbauerianus Kraenzl.
- E. wercklei Schltr.
- E. yungasensis Rolfe ex Rusby

== See also ==
- List of Orchidaceae genera
