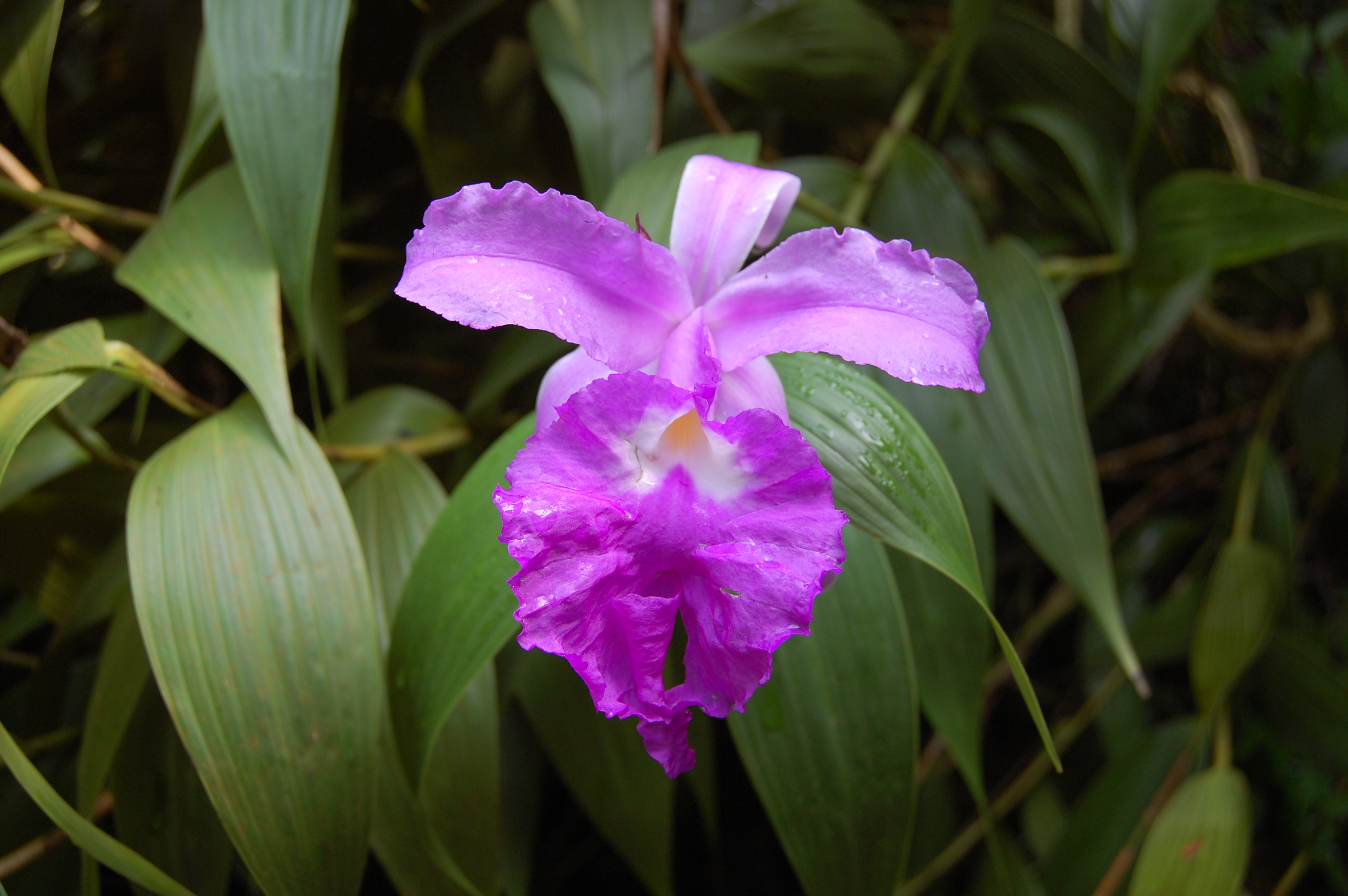
- Flower of Sobralia macrantha

Scientific classification
- Kingdom: Plantae
- Clade: Tracheophytes
- Clade: Angiosperms
- Clade: Monocots
- Order: Asparagales
- Family: Orchidaceae
- Subfamily: Epidendroideae
- Genus: Sobralia
- Species: S. macrantha

Binomial name
- Sobralia macrantha Lindl.

Synonyms
- Cattleya macrantha (Lindl.) Beer 1854

= Sobralia macrantha =

Large-flowered sobralia

Species of orchid

Sobralia macrantha, commonly known as the large-flowered sobralia, is a species of orchid found from north-central and southern Mexico to Central America.

== Subspecies ==
Accepted subspecies:

Image	Name	Distribution
	Sobralia macrantha var. kienastiana Rchb.f.	Costa Rica, El Salvador
	Sobralia macrantha var. macrantha	Belize, Costa Rica, El Salvador, Guatemala, Honduras, Mexico, Nicaragua
