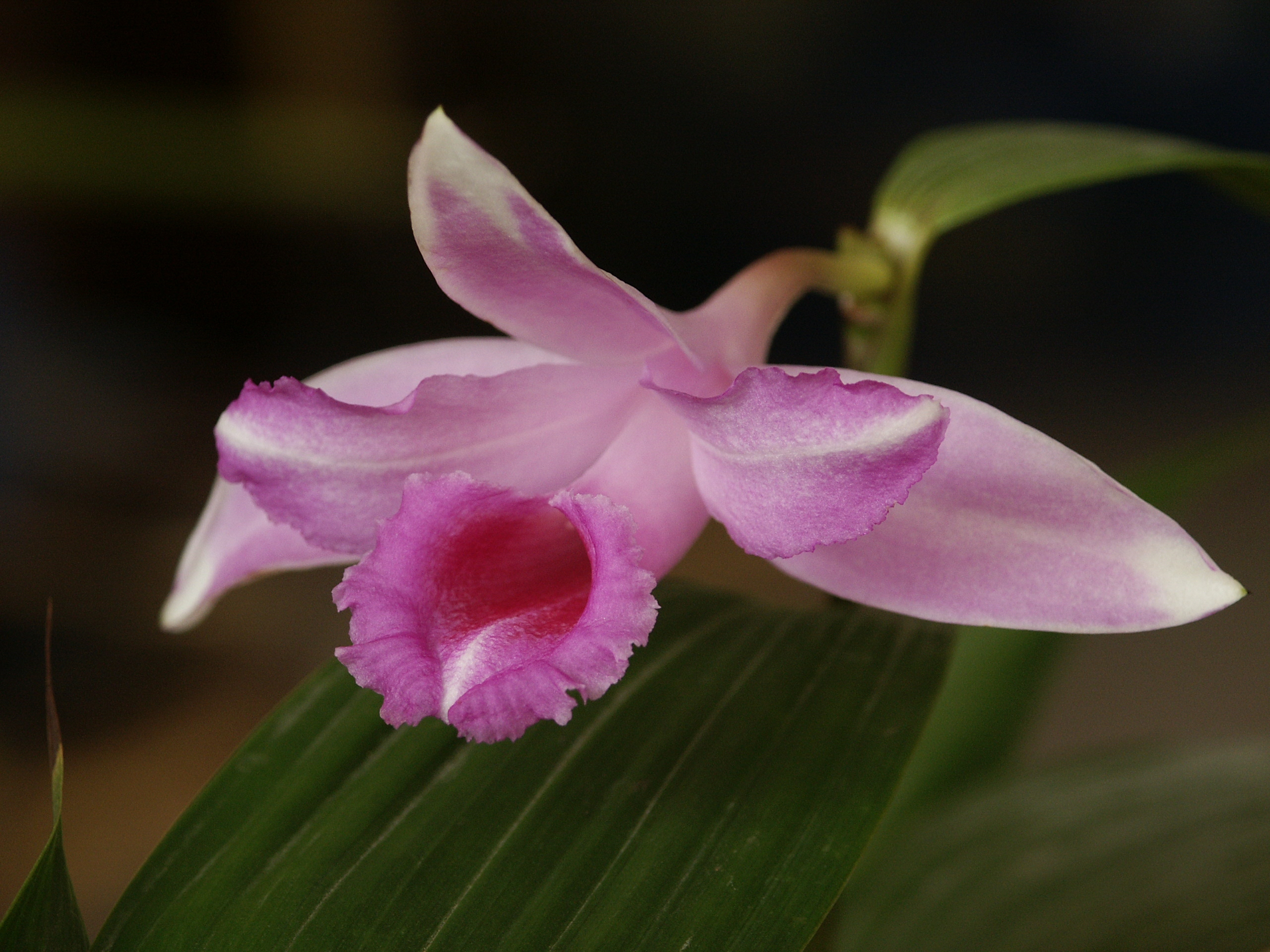
- Sobralia decora

Scientific classification
- Kingdom: Plantae
- Clade: Tracheophytes
- Clade: Angiosperms
- Clade: Monocots
- Order: Asparagales
- Family: Orchidaceae
- Subfamily: Epidendroideae
- Genus: Sobralia
- Species: S. decora

Binomial name
- Sobralia decora Bateman

Synonyms
- Cattleya decora (Bateman) Beer; Sobralia sessilis Lindl.; Sobralia fenzliana Rchb.f.; Cattleya sessilis (Lindl.) Beer; Sobralia panamensis Schltr.; Sobralia panamensis var. albiflos Schltr.; Sobralia neglecta Schltr.

= Sobralia decora =

Beautiful sobralia

Species of orchid

Sobralia decora, commonly known as the beautiful sobralia, is a species of orchid. It is pink-lavender and is found from Mexico through Central America. It is kept by orchid fanciers.

== Note on species name and synonyms ==
There has been a lot of confusion and dubious determinations of this species in the 19th century, see the text in:

- Curtis's botanical magazine vol. 120 (ser. 3 no. 50) tab. 7376: (http://www.botanicus.org/page/453767)
- Biologia Centrali-Americana :zoology, botany and archaeology /edited by Frederick Ducane Godman and Osbert Salvin, vol. 3 page 295. (http://www.botanicus.org/page/598626)
