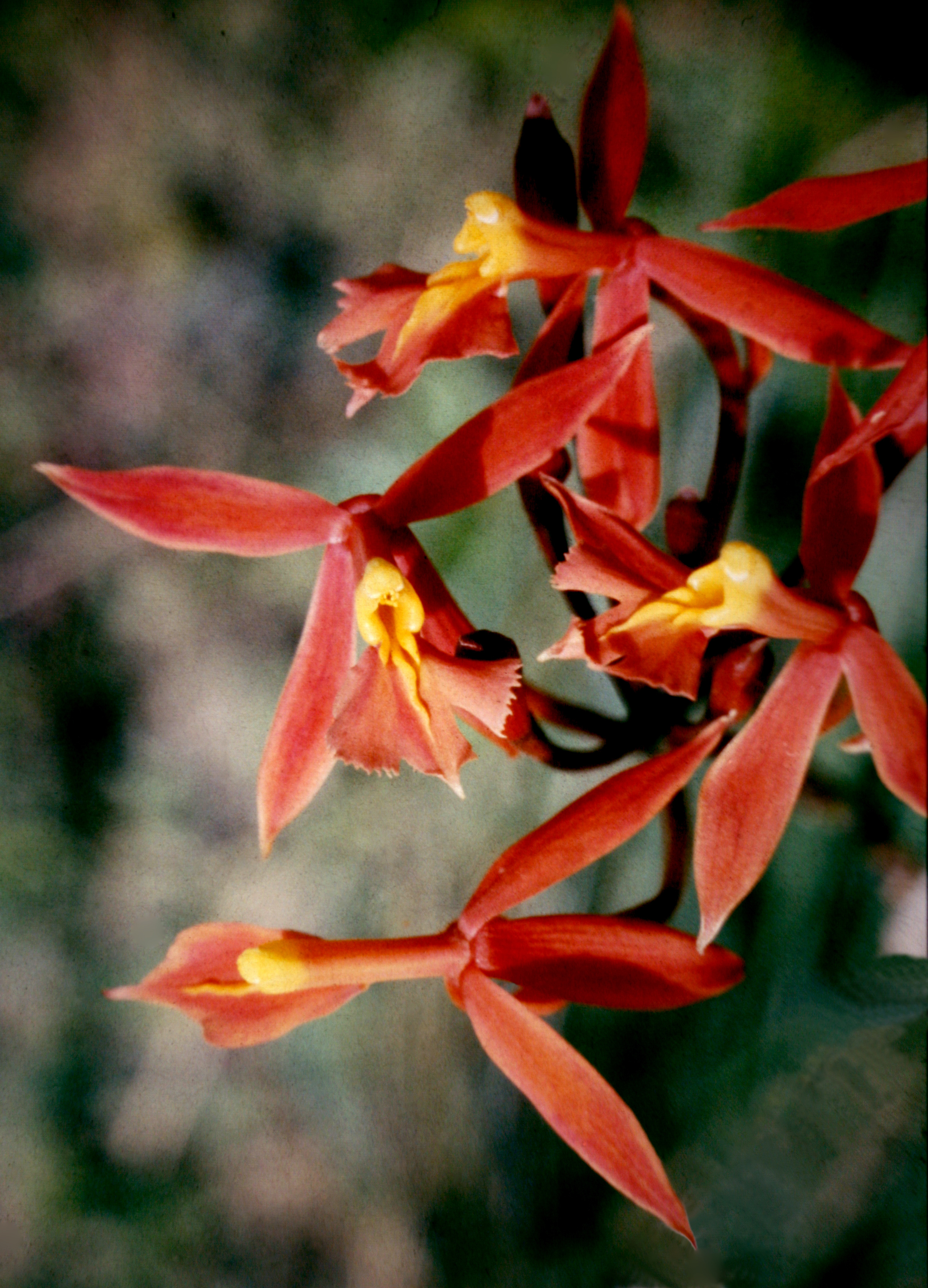
- Epidendrum schomburgkii

Scientific classification
- Kingdom: Plantae
- Clade: Embryophytes
- Clade: Tracheophytes
- Clade: Spermatophytes
- Clade: Angiosperms
- Clade: Monocots
- Order: Asparagales
- Family: Orchidaceae
- Subfamily: Epidendroideae; Kostel.

Type genus
- Epidendrum L.

Tribes
- See text
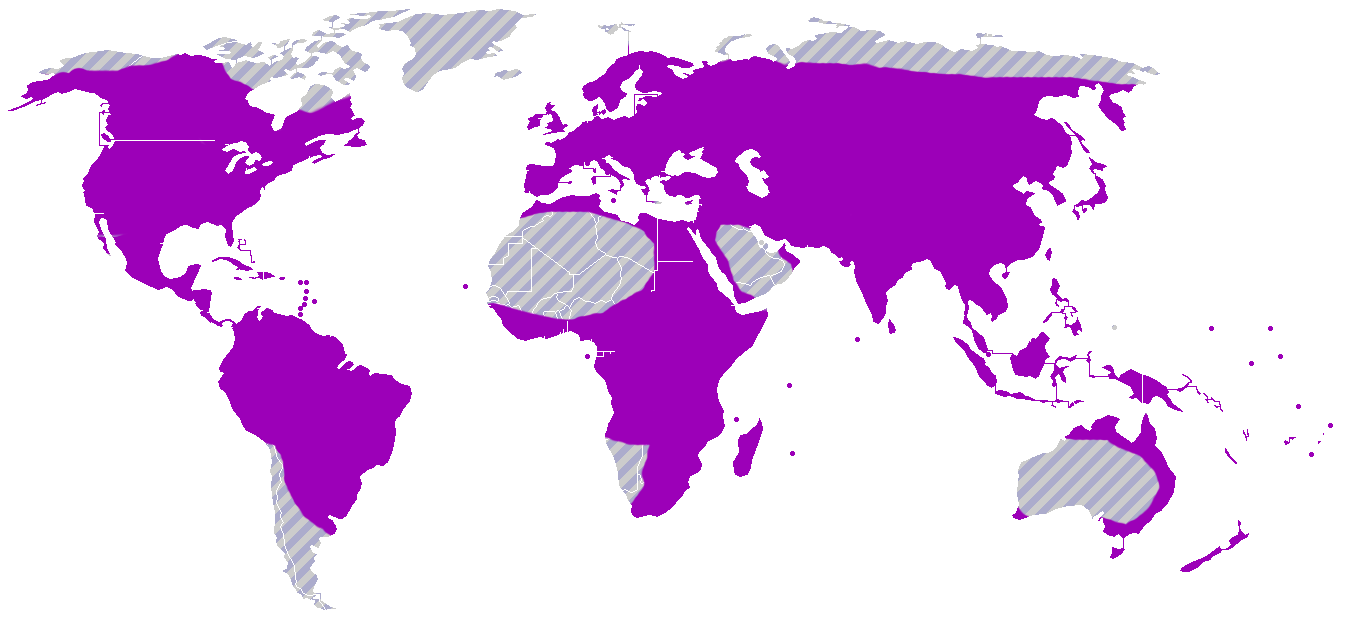

Synonyms
- Vandoideae

= Epidendroideae =

Subfamily of orchids

Epidendroideae is a subfamily of plants in the orchid family, Orchidaceae. Epidendroideae is larger than all the other orchid subfamilies together, comprising more than 15,000 species in 576 genera. Most epidendroid orchids are tropical epiphytes, typically with pseudobulbs. There are, however, some terrestrials such as Epipactis and even a few myco-heterotrophs, which are parasitic upon mycorrhizal fungi.

They typically contain the remaining orchids with a single, fertile anther ( = monandrous), which is also fully incumbent ( = strongly convex) to suberect (= ascending towards the edges). The anther form arises from column elongation or, as in the vandoids, from early anther bending. The incumbent anther forms a right angle with the column axis or is pointed backward in many genera. Most have hard pollinia, i.e. a mass of waxy pollen or of coherent pollen grains. The pollinia are with caudicle and viscidium or without. The stigma are entire or three-lobed; a beak is present. The apical part of the middle stigma lobe forms a stipe ( = pollinium stalk). The ovary is unilocular. The leaves are distichous or spiraling, growing on thickened stems.

The Epidendroideae are difficult to classify. They have been divided in "lower epidendroids" and "higher epidendroids".

== Description ==
Epiphytes are plants which grow above the ground, on top of other plants. They are not planted in the soil and are not parasitic (i.e. they do not feed on other plants; however, some types still damage their host in various ways). By growing on other plants, the epiphytes can reach to the light better or where they can avoid struggling for light. Many mosses and lichens are epiphytes, as are approximately 10 per cent of all seed plants and ferns. Epiphytes are common in some groups of plants, such as ferns, mosses, lichens, and algae. Over half of the 20,000 species of orchids are epiphytes.

== Habitat ==
Most epiphytic seed plants and ferns are found in tropical and subtropical rainforests because they need high humidity to survive. The areas which most epiphytes grow are the montane rainforests. Epiphytic orchids are found on many positions of the host tree, depending on species requirements and size, some large species will grow in a fork, whereas some small species scramble through thin branches, other species will climb up the trunk etc. etc. The trees provide many habitats with different conditions of temperature, contact and light. In temperate places, epiphytes are most common in moist forests, such as the rainforests in Queensland.

== Adaptation ==
Epiphytes are not adapted to droughts in the same way are other flora, because they don't have access to the ground, but they still have some mechanisms to help them survive. Some become completely dormant for months at a time; many epiphytes show crassulacean acid metabolism (CAM), which involves taking in CO_{2} at night, and photo-fixing it during the day with closed stomata to reduce water loss by transpiration. They also contain absorptive plants that are capable at quickly taking up water when it is available and preventing drought when water is scarcer. CAM can be impeded by higher night-time temperatures, dehydrated tissues, and high saturation deficits in the surrounding air, which lower the "stomata conductance" of the epiphytes, reducing the CO_{2} uptake, which in turn reduces growth and reproduction and even induces carbon loss. Higher temperatures, strain on evaporation, and contact to light cause CAM-idling, which is the epiphyte closing its stomata when it becomes stressed, that brings down the range of habitats a species can inhabit. Epiphyte species work biomasses are much more sensitive to different relative moisture levels than other plants.

== Taxonomy ==
It was published by Vincenz Franz Kosteletzky in 1831 with Epidendrum L. as the type genus.

=== Tribe classification ===
The subfamily Epidendroideae is divided into two clades or subgroups known as the higher epidendroids (vandoids) and the lower epidendroids. The lower epidendroids contain polyphyletic tribes, particularly the Arethuseae and Epidendreae. The tribes are listed below:

- - - - - - Epidendreae
          - - Maxillarieae
            - Vandeae
        - - - Collabieae
            - Podochileae
          - Calypsoeae
      - Arethuseae
    - Dendrobieae
  - Malaxideae

The tribes of the subfamily Epidendroideae (as of 2014)

Higher epidendroids (vandoids)

- Cymbidieae
- Vandeae

Lower epidendroids

- Arethuseae (polyphyletic)
- Calypsoeae
- Collabieae
- Dendrobieae
- Epidendreae (polyphyletic)
- Gastrodieae
- Malaxideae
- Neottieae
- Nervilieae
- Podochileae
- Sobraliinae
- Triphoreae
- Tropidieae
- Xerorchideae

This classification has a rather ephemeral nature and is prone to frequent revision. Changes are likely to occur as new morphological and genetic data become available.

The genus Devogelia is not placed in a tribe.
