= Helmet orchid =

Helmet orchid is a common name for several plants and may refer to:

- Coryanthes
- Corybas
- Cranichis
- Nematoceras
- Pterostylis
