= Cranichis ricartii =

Conservation status
- Endangered (ESA)

Scientific classification
- Kingdom: Plantae
- Clade: Tracheophytes
- Clade: Angiosperms
- Clade: Monocots
- Order: Asparagales
- Family: Orchidaceae
- Subfamily: Orchidoideae
- Tribe: Cranichideae
- Genus: Cranichis
- Species: C. ricartii

Binomial name
- Cranichis ricartii Ackerman

Species of orchid

Cranichis ricartii is a rare species of orchid known by the common name Puerto Rico helmet orchid. It is native to Puerto Rico, where it is known from three locations in one forest. The plant has also been seen in Guadeloupe. The plant's rarity is the main reason for its listing as an endangered species of the United States.

This orchid was discovered in 1979 growing in the mountain forest habitat of the Maricao Commonwealth Forest on the west side of the island of Puerto Rico. There have been no more than 30 individuals noted in total. Though it is known to occur at three sites, it is not seen at all three sites each year. This is a serpentine endemic plant, growing in areas that are rich in serpentine soils such as the Maricao Forest, which has over 85% serpentine substrate. This terrestrial orchid grows in the humus of the understory of trees such as Coccoloba pirifolia, Randia aculeata and Comocladia glabra. It can often be found with its relative, the orchid Cranichis tenuis.

This orchid grows up to 27 centimeters tall, the base of the stem surrounded by several small oval leaves up to 3.5 centimeters long by 2 wide. The inflorescence bears a raceme of several green flowers about 2 centimeters long by 1 wide. The plant blooms in the fall.

The plant is threatened mainly by its limited numbers and by disturbance in its habitat. The Maricao Commonwealth Forest is a protected area but certain activities may be detrimental to the species, such as trail maintenance and selective thinning of the forest. One population was destroyed in 1995 when a road was built in the area.
