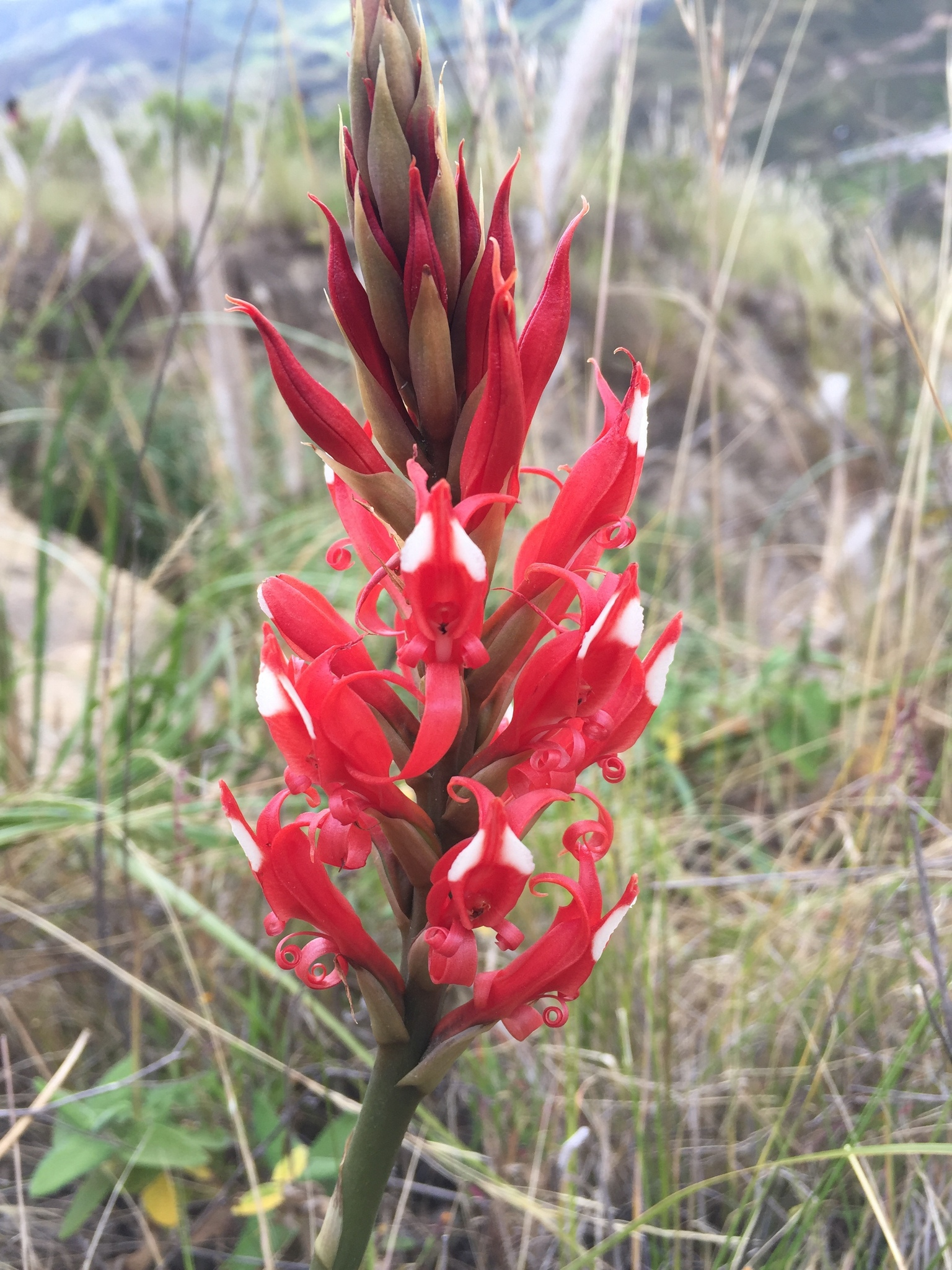
- Porphyrostachys pilifera

Scientific classification
- Kingdom: Plantae
- Clade: Tracheophytes
- Clade: Angiosperms
- Clade: Monocots
- Order: Asparagales
- Family: Orchidaceae
- Subfamily: Orchidoideae
- Tribe: Cranichideae
- Subtribe: Cranichidinae
- Genus: Porphyrostachys; Rchb.f.

= Porphyrostachys =

Genus of flowering plants

Porphyrostachys is a genus of flowering plants from the orchid family, Orchidaceae, native to South America. As of June 2014, it contains two known species:

- Porphyrostachys parviflora (C.Schweinf.) Garay - Peru
- Porphyrostachys pilifera (Kunth) Rchb.f. - Peru, Ecuador
