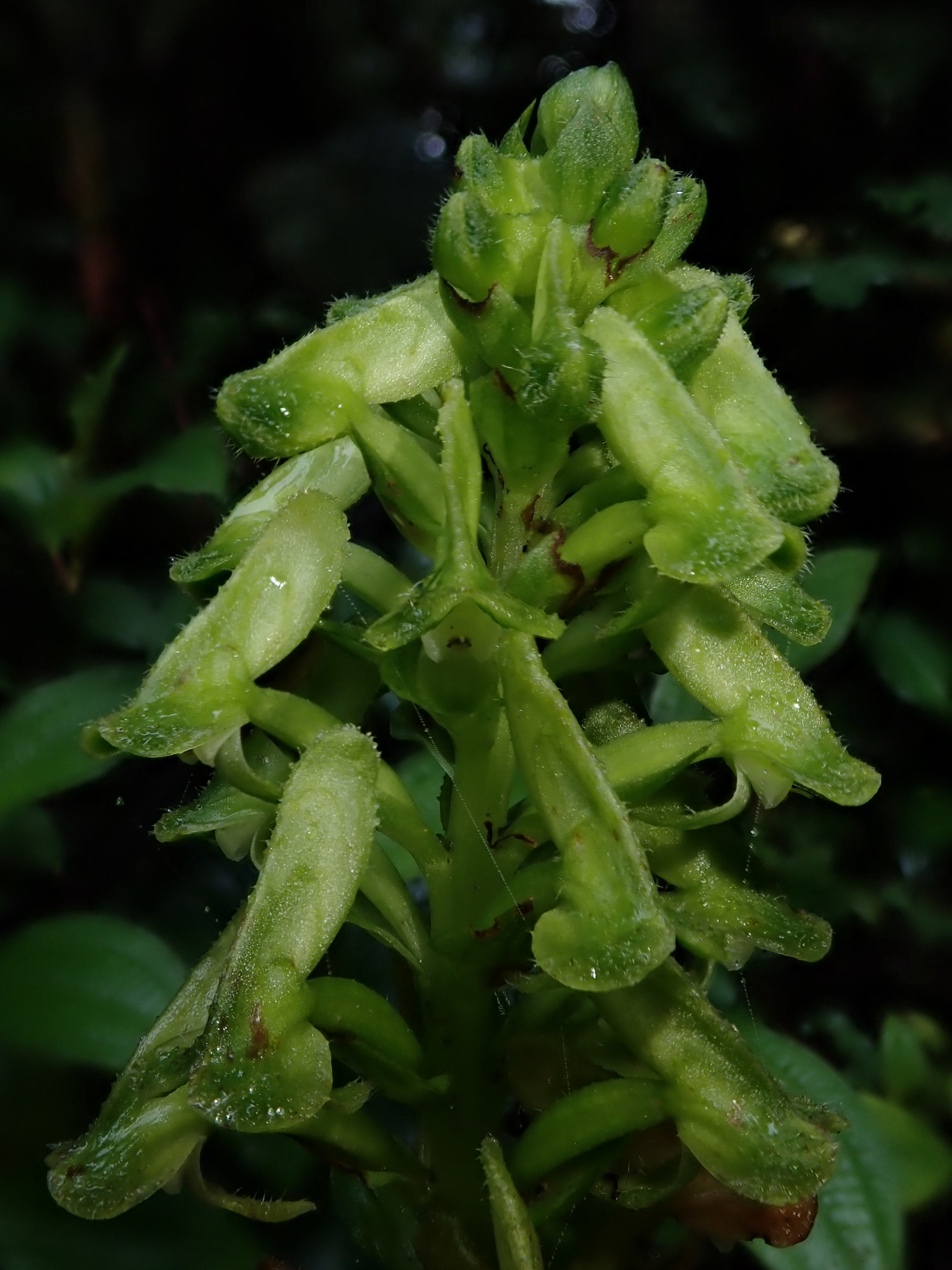
- Pseudocentrum bursarium in Napo, Ecuador

Scientific classification
- Kingdom: Plantae
- Clade: Tracheophytes
- Clade: Angiosperms
- Clade: Monocots
- Order: Asparagales
- Family: Orchidaceae
- Subfamily: Orchidoideae
- Tribe: Cranichideae
- Subtribe: Cranichidinae
- Genus: Pseudocentrum; Lindl.

= Pseudocentrum =

Genus of flowering plants

Pseudocentrum is a genus of flowering plants from the orchid family, Orchidaceae. It is native to Central America, the West Indies and northern South America.

Species recognized as of June 2014:

1. Pseudocentrum bursarium Rchb.f. - Colombia, Ecuador, Peru
2. Pseudocentrum guadalupense Cogn. in I.Urban - Guadeloupe
3. Pseudocentrum hoffmannii (Rchb.f.) Rchb.f. - Costa Rica, Panama
4. Pseudocentrum macrostachyum Lindl. - Colombia, Ecuador, Peru
5. Pseudocentrum minus Benth. - Jamaica, Dominican Republic
6. Pseudocentrum purdii Garay - Colombia
7. Pseudocentrum sylvicola Rchb.f. - Colombia, Ecuador
