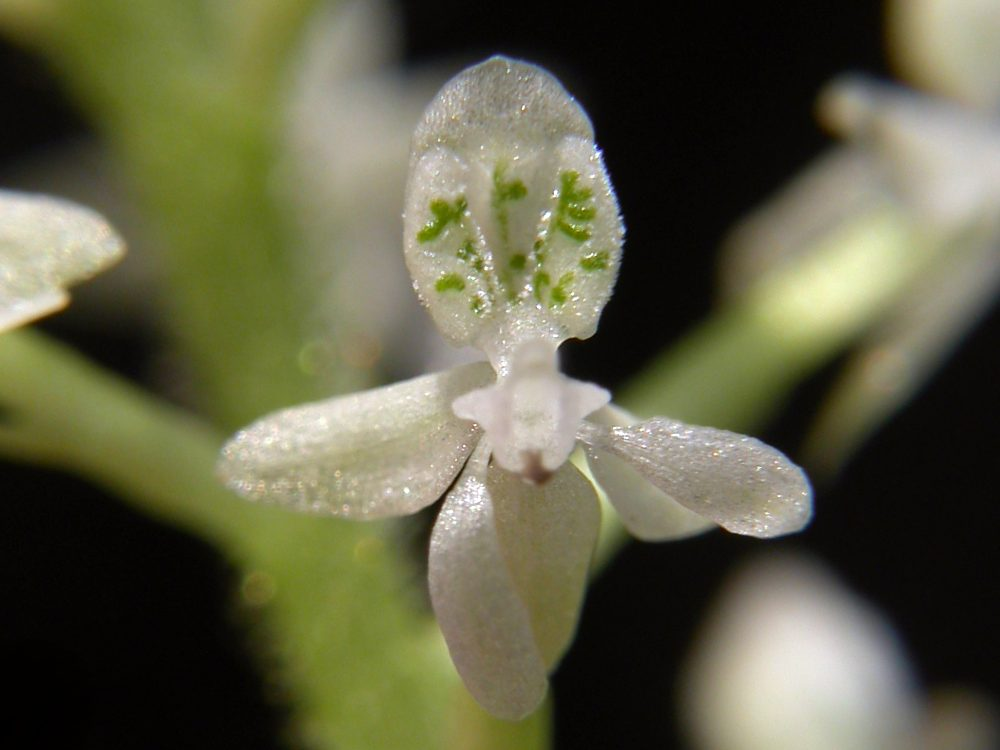
- Cranichis candida

Scientific classification
- Kingdom: Plantae
- Clade: Tracheophytes
- Clade: Angiosperms
- Clade: Monocots
- Order: Asparagales
- Family: Orchidaceae
- Subfamily: Orchidoideae
- Tribe: Cranichideae
- Subtribe: Cranichidinae; Lindl. ex Meisn. (1842)

Genera
- Aa; Altensteinia; Baskervilla; Cranichis; Fuertesiella; Galeoglossum; Gomphichis; Myrosmodes; Ponthieva; Porphyrostachys; Prescottia; Pseudocentrum; Pterichis; Solenocentrum; Stenoptera

Synonyms
- Prescottiinae Dressler

= Cranichidinae =

Subtribe of orchids

Cranichidinae is an orchid subtribe in the tribe Cranichideae.

== See also ==
- Taxonomy of the Orchidaceae
