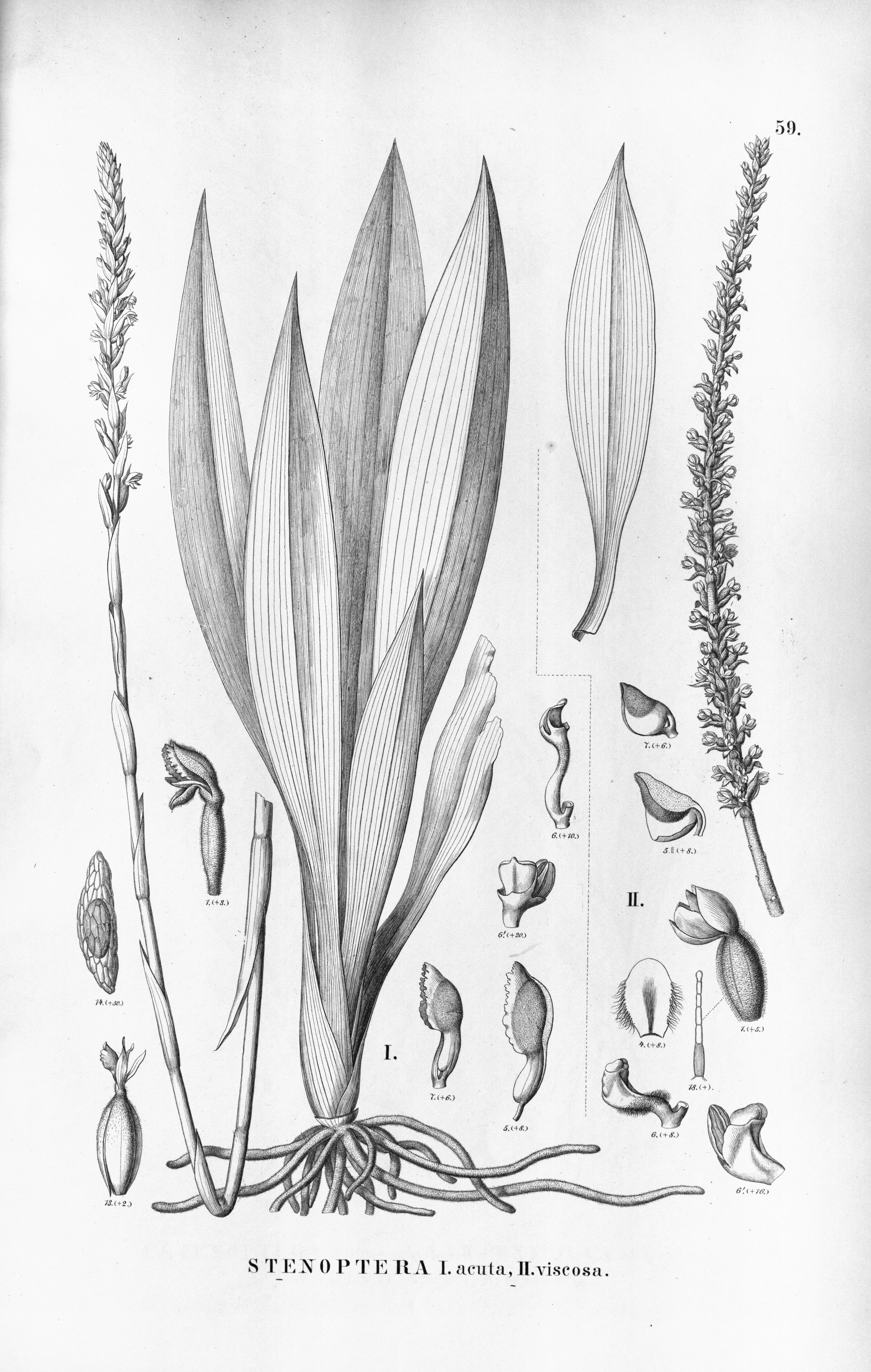
- Botanical illustration of Stenoptera acuta

Scientific classification
- Kingdom: Plantae
- Clade: Tracheophytes
- Clade: Angiosperms
- Clade: Monocots
- Order: Asparagales
- Family: Orchidaceae
- Subfamily: Orchidoideae
- Tribe: Cranichideae
- Subtribe: Cranichidinae
- Genus: Stenoptera; C.Presl

Type species
- Stenoptera peruviana C.Presl

= Stenoptera =

Genus of flowering plants

The gelechioid moth genus Stenoptera, established by Duponchel in 1838, is a junior synonym of Esperia. The gall midge genus Stenoptera, invalidly established by Meunier in 1902, has been renamed Neostenoptera.

Stenoptera is a genus of flowering plants from the family Orchidaceae, endemic to South America.

== Species ==
Species accepted as of June 2014:

1. Stenoptera acuta Lindl. - Peru, Brazil
2. Stenoptera ciliaris C.Schweinf. - Peru
3. Stenoptera ecuadorana Dodson & C.Vargas - Ecuador
4. Stenoptera huilaensis Garay - Colombia
5. Stenoptera laxiflora C.Schweinf. - Peru
6. Stenoptera montana C.Schweinf. - Peru
7. Stenoptera peruviana C.Presl - Colombia, Ecuador, Peru
