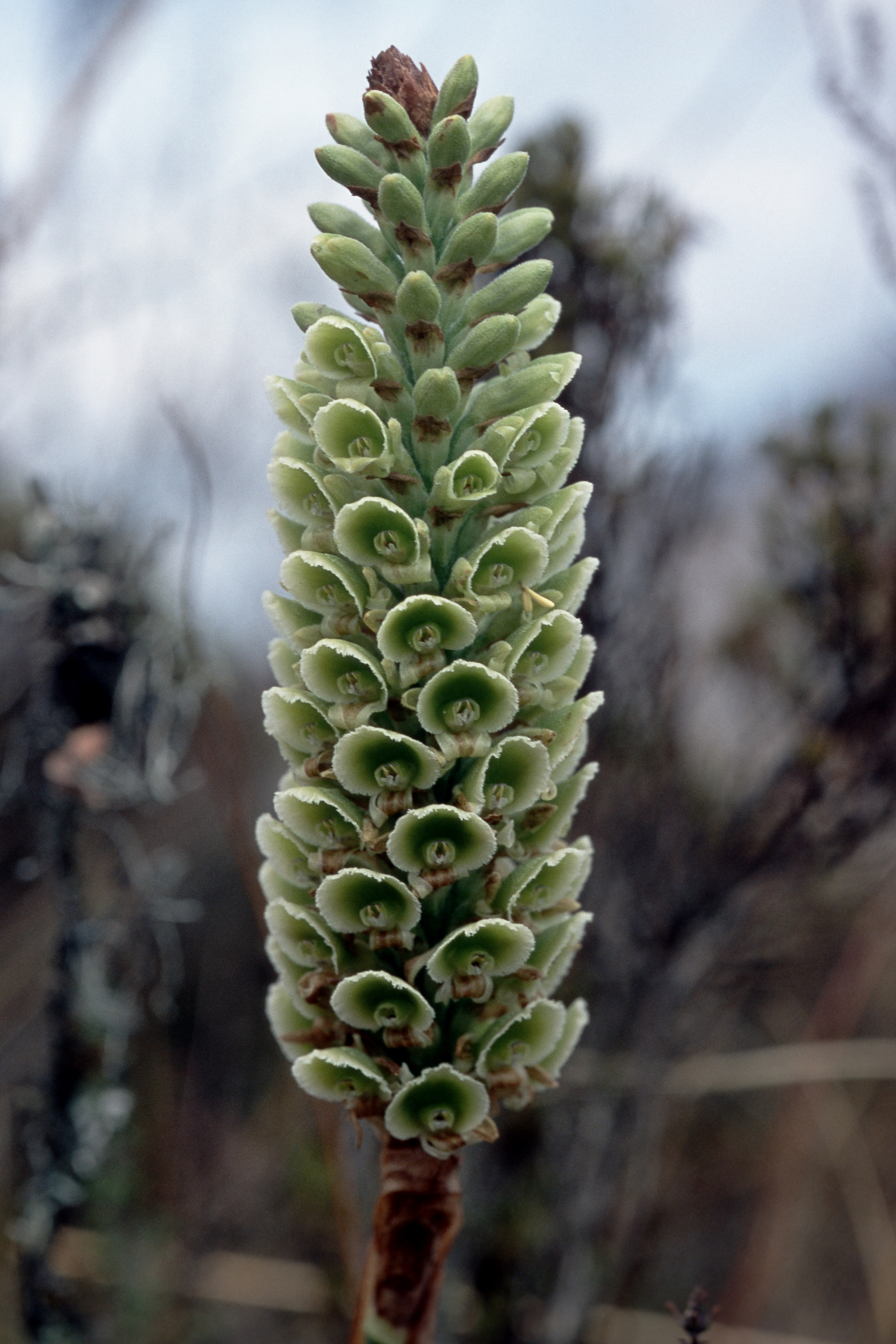
- Altensteinia virescens

Scientific classification
- Kingdom: Plantae
- Clade: Tracheophytes
- Clade: Angiosperms
- Clade: Monocots
- Order: Asparagales
- Family: Orchidaceae
- Subfamily: Orchidoideae
- Tribe: Cranichideae
- Subtribe: Cranichidinae
- Genus: Altensteinia; Kunth

Species
- See text

= Altensteinia =

Species of plant

Altensteinia is a genus of orchids. It is found in the Andean region of South America. At present (May 2014), eight species are accepted.

== List of species ==
- Altensteinia boliviensis Rolfe ex Rusby (1895) - Peru, Bolivia
- Altensteinia citrina Garay (1978) - Ecuador
- Altensteinia cundinamarcae S.Nowak, Szlach. & Mytnik, 2014 - Colombia (Cundinamarca).
- Altensteinia elliptica C.Schweinf. (1951) - Peru
- Altensteinia fimbriata Kunth (1816) - type species - Venezuela, Bolivia, Colombia, Ecuador, Peru
- Altensteinia longispicata C.Schweinf. (1941) - Peru
- Altensteinia marginata Rchb.f. (1878) - Peru
- Altensteinia virescens Lindl. (1845) - Colombia, Ecuador
