= Prescottia =

Prescottia may refer to:

- Prescottia (leafhopper), a leafhopper genus in the family Cicadellidae
- Prescottia (plant), a plant genus in the family Orchidaceae
- Prescottia (bacterium), a synonym of the bacterial genus Nocardia
