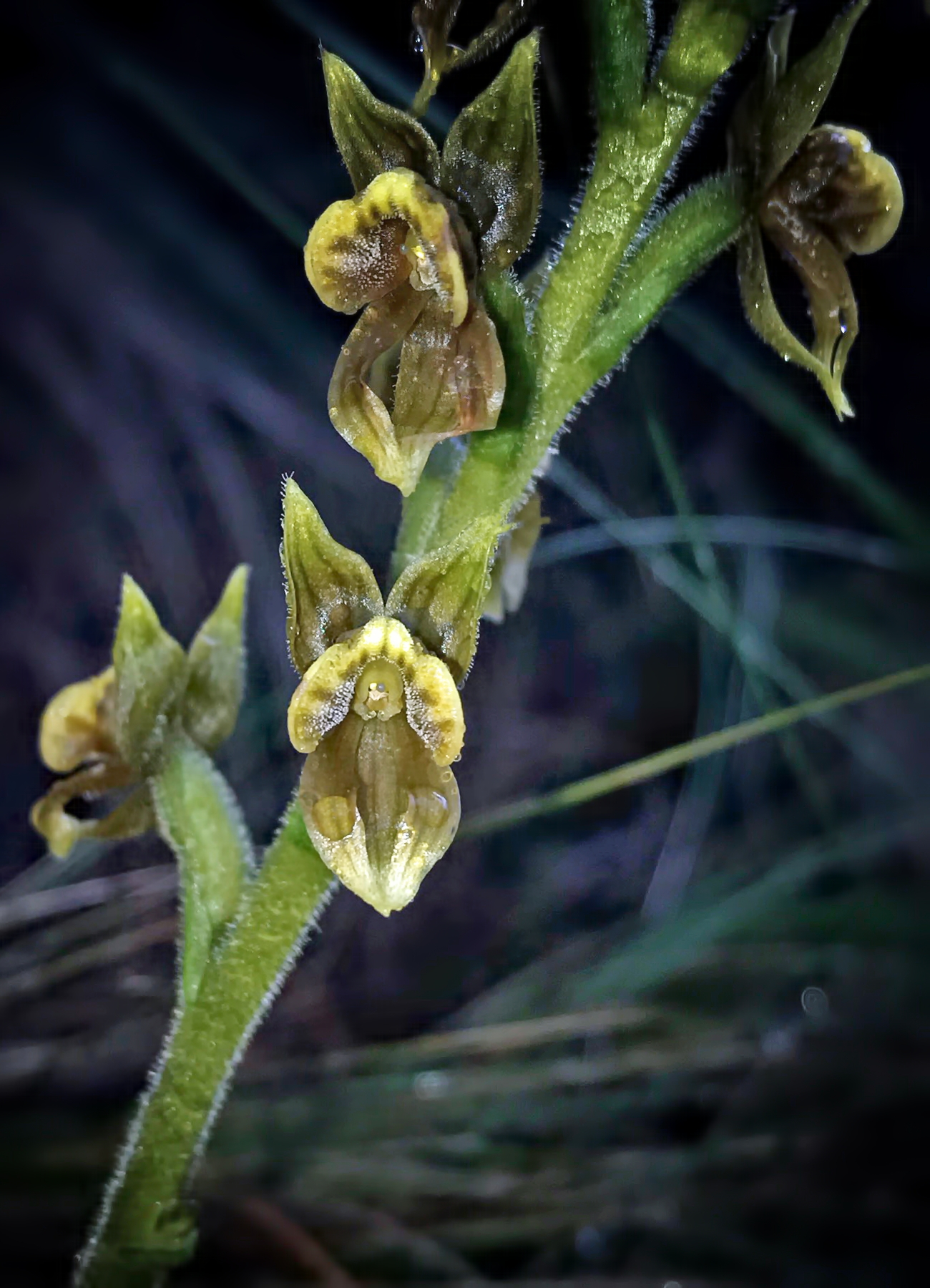
- Pterichis triloba

Scientific classification
- Kingdom: Plantae
- Clade: Tracheophytes
- Clade: Angiosperms
- Clade: Monocots
- Order: Asparagales
- Family: Orchidaceae
- Subfamily: Orchidoideae
- Tribe: Cranichideae
- Subtribe: Cranichidinae
- Genus: Pterichis; Lindl. (1840)

Synonyms
- Acraea Lindl. in G.Bentham

= Pterichis =

Genus of flowering plants

Pterichis is a genus of flowering plants from the orchid family, Orchidaceae. It is native to South America, Central America and Jamaica.

Species recognized as of June 2014:

1. Pterichis acuminata Schltr. - Colombia, Ecuador, Peru
2. Pterichis bangii Rolfe - Bolivia
3. Pterichis boliviana Schltr. - Bolivia, Argentina
4. Pterichis colombiana G.Morales - Colombia
5. Pterichis fernandezii G.Morales - Colombia
6. Pterichis galeata Lindl. - Colombia, Bolivia, Argentina, Ecuador, Peru, Costa Rica
7. Pterichis habenarioides (F.Lehm. & Kraenzl.) Schltr. - Costa Rica, Panama, Colombia, Ecuador, Venezuela
8. Pterichis latifolia Garay & Dunst. - Venezuela
9. Pterichis leucoptera Schltr. - Peru
10. Pterichis macroptera Schltr. - Peru
11. Pterichis mandonii (Rchb.f.) Rolfe - Bolivia
12. Pterichis multiflora (Lindl.) Schltr. - Colombia, Ecuador, Venezuela, Argentina
13. Pterichis parvifolia (Lindl.) Schltr. - Colombia, Ecuador, Peru
14. Pterichis pauciflora Schltr. - Colombia, Ecuador
15. Pterichis proctorii Garay - Jamaica
16. Pterichis saxicola Schltr. - Bolivia
17. Pterichis silvestris Schltr. - Bolivia, Peru
18. Pterichis triloba (Lindl.) Schltr. - Colombia, Ecuador, Peru
19. Pterichis weberbaueriana Kraenzl. - Peru
20. Pterichis yungasensis Schltr. - Bolivia
