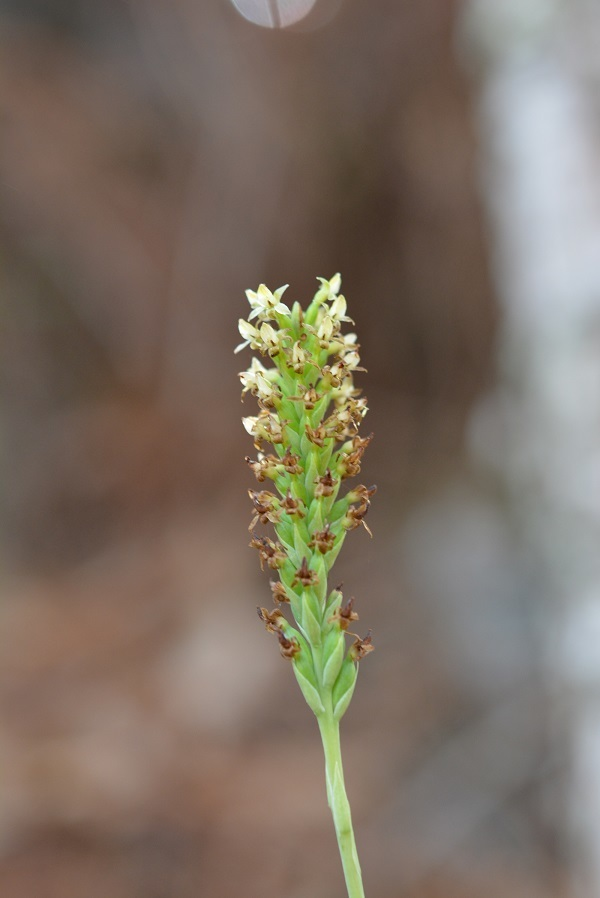
- Galeoglossum tubulosum

Scientific classification
- Kingdom: Plantae
- Clade: Tracheophytes
- Clade: Angiosperms
- Clade: Monocots
- Order: Asparagales
- Family: Orchidaceae
- Subfamily: Orchidoideae
- Tribe: Cranichideae
- Subtribe: Cranichidinae
- Genus: Galeoglossum; A.Rich. & Galeotti

Synonyms
- Pseudocranichis Garay

= Galeoglossum =

Genus of orchids

Galeoglossum is a genus of orchids native to Mexico and Guatemala.

Species:

- Galeoglossum cactorum Salazar & C.Chávez - Oaxaca
- Galeoglossum thysanochilum (B.L.Rob. & Greenm.) Salazar - Oaxaca
- Galeoglossum tubulosum (Lindl.) Salazar & Soto Arenas from Central Mexico south to Guatemala
