= Manniella =

Manniella may refer to:

- Manniella (plant), a genus of orchids
- Manniella (subgenus), a subgenus of carpenter ants
