= Fuertesiella =

Scientific classification
- Kingdom: Plantae
- Clade: Tracheophytes
- Clade: Angiosperms
- Clade: Monocots
- Order: Asparagales
- Family: Orchidaceae
- Subfamily: Orchidoideae
- Tribe: Cranichideae
- Subtribe: Cranichidinae
- Genus: Fuertesiella; Schltr. in I.Urban
- Species: F. pterichoides

Binomial name
- Fuertesiella pterichoides Schltr. in I.Urban

Synonyms
- Cranichis grandiflora Ames & C.Schweinf.; Fuertesiella grandiflora (Ames & C.Schweinf.) Schltr.

Genus of orchids

Fuertesiella is a genus of flowering plants from the orchid family, Orchidaceae. It contains only one known species, Fuertesiella pterichoides, native to Cuba and to the Dominican Republic.

== See also ==
- List of Orchidaceae genera
