= Solenocentrum =

Scientific classification
- Kingdom: Plantae
- Clade: Tracheophytes
- Clade: Angiosperms
- Clade: Monocots
- Order: Asparagales
- Family: Orchidaceae
- Subfamily: Orchidoideae
- Tribe: Cranichideae
- Subtribe: Cranichidinae
- Genus: Solenocentrum; Schltr.

Genus of flowering plants

Solenocentrum is a genus of flowering plants from the orchid family, Orchidaceae. It is native to southeastern Central America and northwestern South America, from Costa Rica to Bolivia.

As of June 2014, four species are known:

- Solenocentrum asplundii (Garay) Garay - Colombia, Ecuador
- Solenocentrum costaricense Schltr. - Costa Rica, Panama
- Solenocentrum lueri Dodson & R.Vásquez - Bolivia
- Solenocentrum maasii Dressler - Costa Rica
