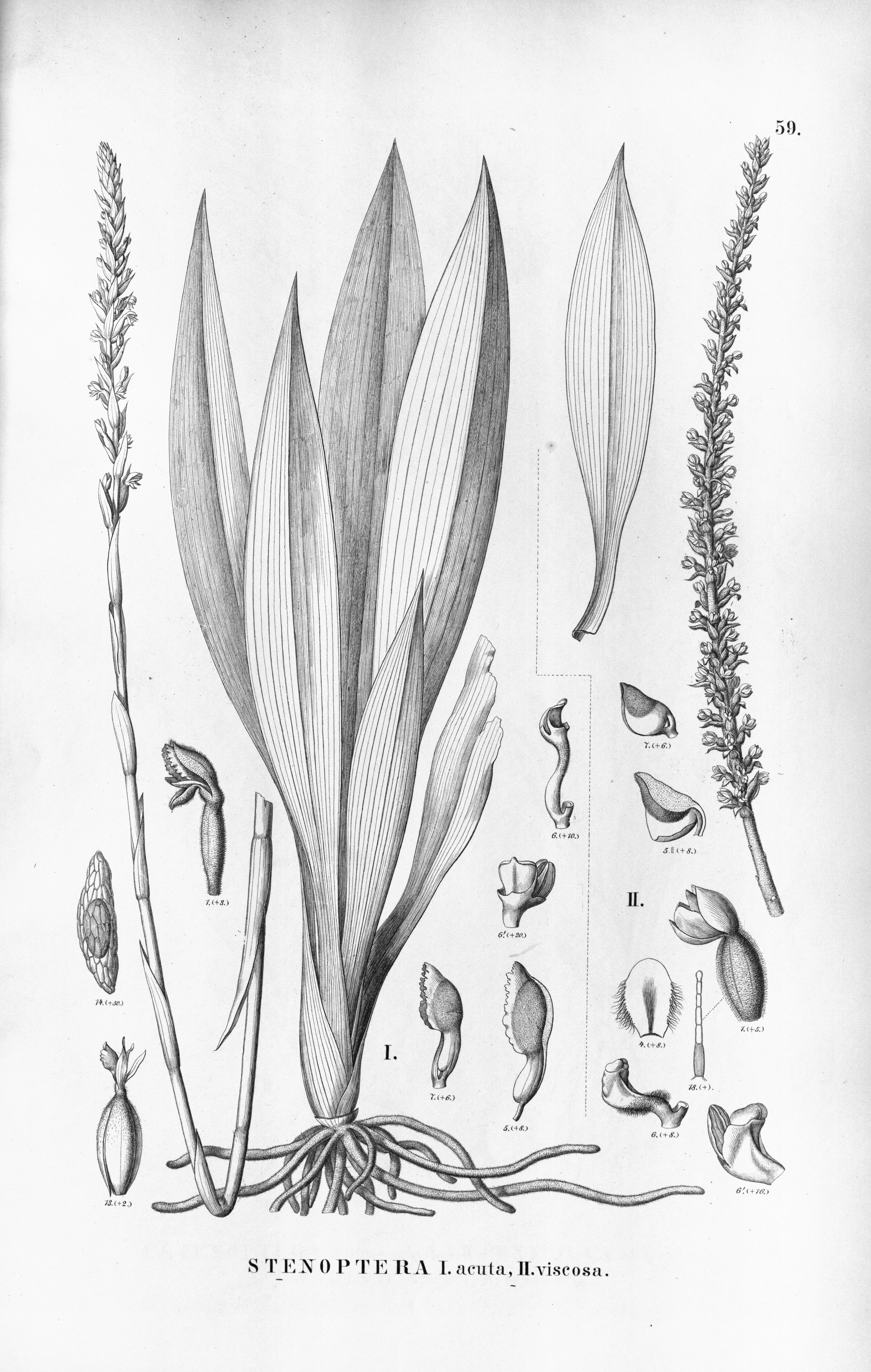
- Gomphichis viscosa 1895 illustration

Scientific classification
- Kingdom: Plantae
- Clade: Tracheophytes
- Clade: Angiosperms
- Clade: Monocots
- Order: Asparagales
- Family: Orchidaceae
- Subfamily: Orchidoideae
- Tribe: Cranichideae
- Subtribe: Cranichidinae
- Genus: Gomphichis; Lindl. (1840)

= Gomphichis =

Genus of orchids

Gomphichis is a genus of flowering plants from the orchid family, Orchidaceae, native to Costa Rica and northern South America.

Species:

1. Gomphichis adnata (Ridl.) Schltr.
2. Gomphichis alba F.Lehm. & Kraenzl.
3. Gomphichis altissima Renz
4. Gomphichis bogotensis Renz
5. Gomphichis brachystachys Schltr.
6. Gomphichis caucana Schltr.
7. Gomphichis cladotricha Renz
8. Gomphichis crassilabia Garay
9. Gomphichis cundinamarcae Renz
10. Gomphichis goodyeroides Lindl.
11. Gomphichis gracilis Schltr.
12. Gomphichis hetaerioides Schltr.
13. Gomphichis koehleri Schltr.
14. Gomphichis lancipetala Schltr.
15. Gomphichis longifolia (Rolfe) Schltr.
16. Gomphichis longiscapa (Kraenzl.) Schltr.
17. Gomphichis macbridei C.Schweinf.
18. Gomphichis plantaginea Schltr.
19. Gomphichis plantaginifolia C.Schweinf.
20. Gomphichis scaposa Schltr.
21. Gomphichis steyermarkii Foldats
22. Gomphichis traceyae Rolfe
23. Gomphichis valida Rchb.f
24. Gomphichis viscosa (Rchb.f.) Schltr.
