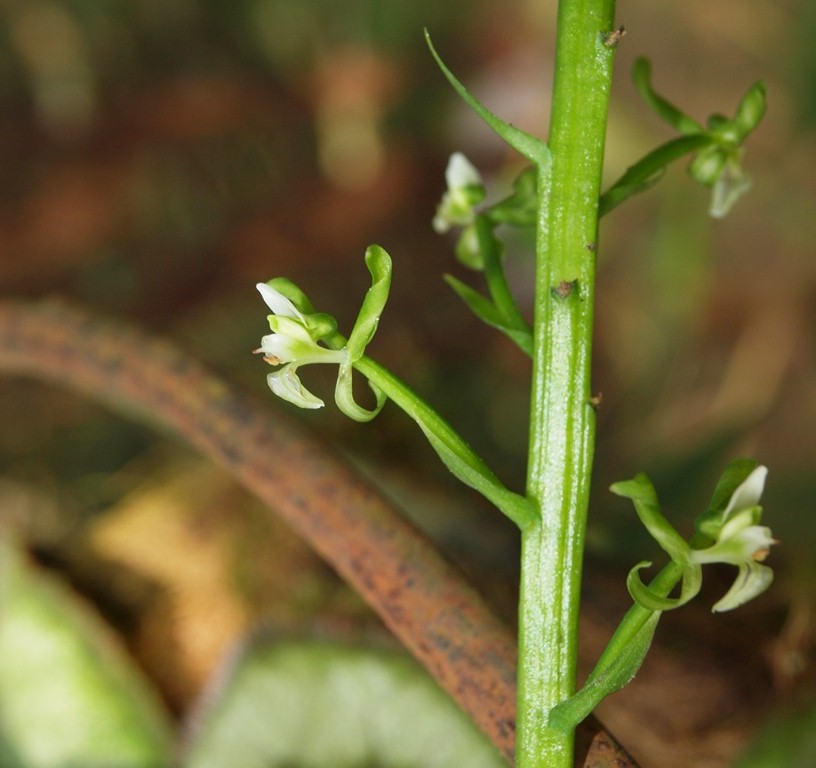
- Baskervilla colombiana

Scientific classification
- Kingdom: Plantae
- Clade: Tracheophytes
- Clade: Angiosperms
- Clade: Monocots
- Order: Asparagales
- Family: Orchidaceae
- Subfamily: Orchidoideae
- Tribe: Cranichideae
- Subtribe: Cranichidinae
- Genus: Baskervilla; Lindl. (1840)

Type species
- Baskervilla assurgens Lindl.

= Baskervilla =

Genus of flowering plants

Baskervilla is a genus of flowering plants from the orchid family, Orchidaceae. It consists of 10 species native to Central America and South America.

Species:

1. Baskervilla assurgens Lindl. - Colombia, Ecuador, Peru
2. Baskervilla auriculata Garay - Ecuador, Bolivia
3. Baskervilla boliviana T.Hashim - Bolivia
4. Baskervilla colombiana Garay - Costa Rica, Nicaragua, Panama, Colombia, Venezuela
5. Baskervilla leptantha Dressler - Costa Rica
6. Baskervilla machupicchuensis Nauray & Christenson - Peru
7. Baskervilla paranaensis (Kraenzl.) Schltr. - Brazil
8. Baskervilla pastasae Garay - Ecuador
9. Baskervilla stenopetala Dressler - Panama
10. Baskervilla venezuelana Garay & Dunst. - Colombia, Venezuela, Guyana

== See also ==
- List of Orchidaceae genera
