= Altensteinia boliviensis =

Conservation status
- CITES Appendix II

Scientific classification
- Kingdom: Plantae
- Clade: Tracheophytes
- Clade: Angiosperms
- Clade: Monocots
- Order: Asparagales
- Family: Orchidaceae
- Subfamily: Orchidoideae
- Tribe: Cranichideae
- Genus: Altensteinia
- Species: A. boliviensis

Binomial name
- Altensteinia boliviensis Rolfe ex Rusby

Species of orchid

Altensteinia boliviensis is a species of terrestrial orchid found in Bolivia and Peru. It was described by Robert Allen Rolfe, as reported by Henry Hurd Rusby in Memoirs of the Torrey Botanical Club.
