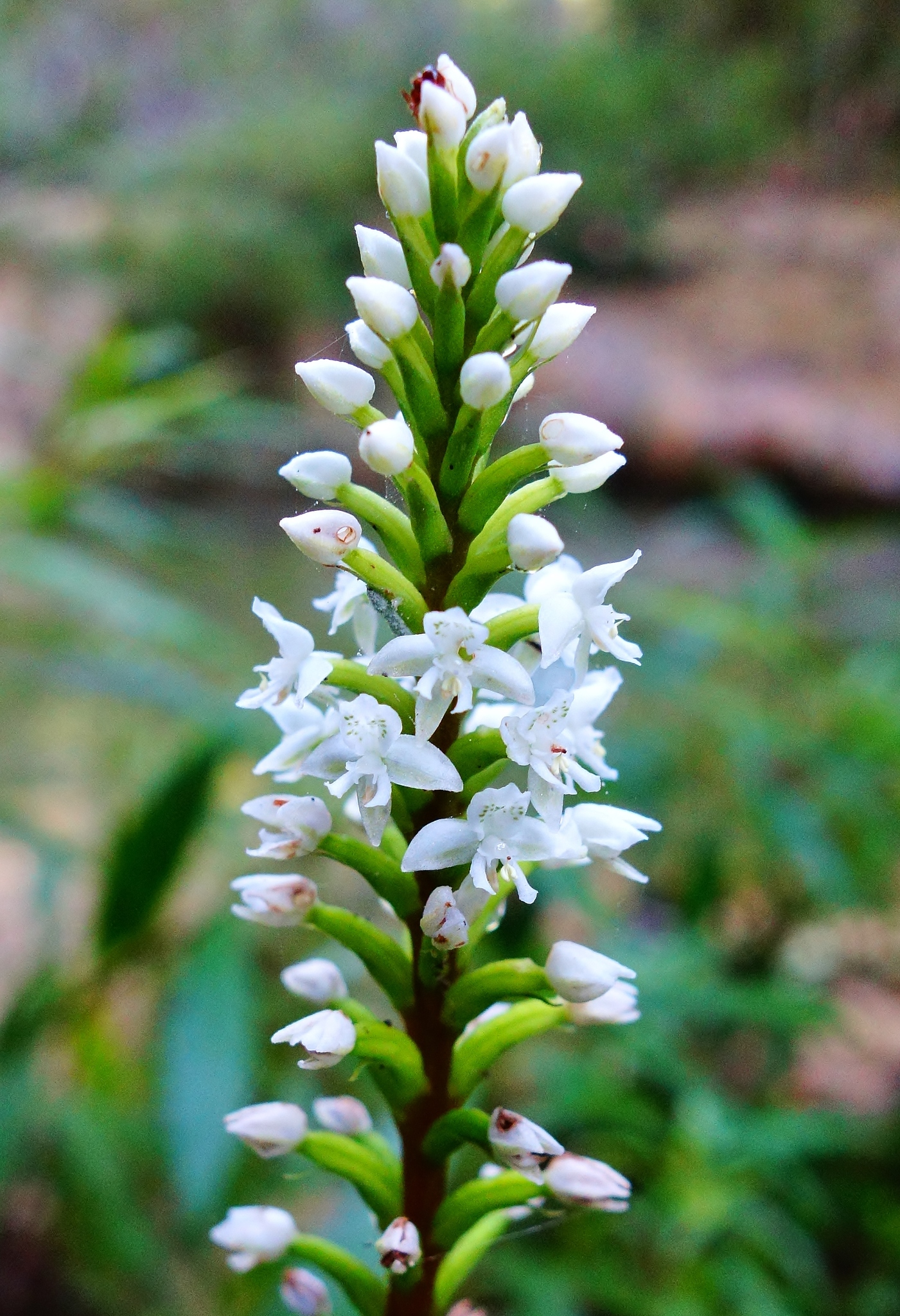

Scientific classification
- Kingdom: Plantae
- Clade: Tracheophytes
- Clade: Angiosperms
- Clade: Monocots
- Order: Asparagales
- Family: Orchidaceae
- Subfamily: Orchidoideae
- Tribe: Cranichideae
- Genus: Cranichis
- Species: C. muscosa

Binomial name
- Cranichis muscosa Sw.

Synonyms
- Cranichis bradei Schltr.

= Cranichis muscosa =

Cypress-knee helmet orchid

Species of orchid

Cranichis muscosa, the cypress-knee helmet orchid, is a species of terrestrial orchid. It is widespread across most of the West Indies, extending into Central America, southern Mexico, Belize, northern South America, and southern Florida.
