= Manniella cypripedioides =

Conservation status
- Endangered (IUCN 3.1)

Scientific classification
- Kingdom: Plantae
- Clade: Embryophytes
- Clade: Tracheophytes
- Clade: Spermatophytes
- Clade: Angiosperms
- Clade: Monocots
- Order: Asparagales
- Family: Orchidaceae
- Subfamily: Orchidoideae
- Tribe: Cranichideae
- Genus: Manniella
- Species: M. cypripedioides

Binomial name
- Manniella cypripedioides Salazar, T.Franke, Zapfack & Beenken

Species of flowering plant

Manniella cypripedioides is a species of plant in the family Orchidaceae. It is found in Cameroon and Equatorial Guinea. Its natural habitat is subtropical or tropical moist lowland forests. It is threatened by habitat loss.
