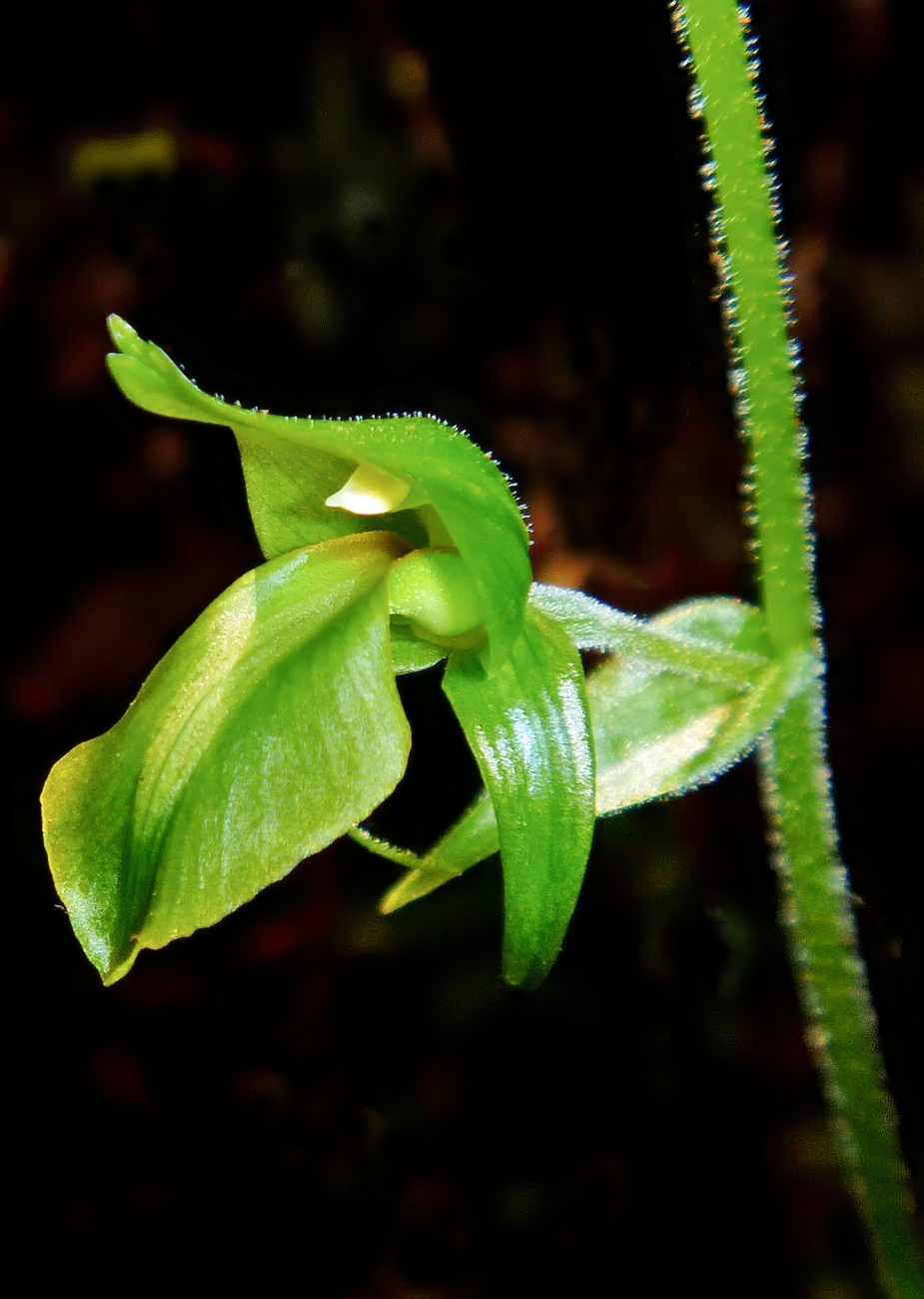

Scientific classification
- Kingdom: Plantae
- Clade: Tracheophytes
- Clade: Angiosperms
- Clade: Monocots
- Order: Asparagales
- Family: Orchidaceae
- Subfamily: Orchidoideae
- Tribe: Cranichideae
- Subtribe: Pterostylidinae
- Genus: Achlydosa; M.A.Clem. & D.M.Jones
- Species: A. glandulosa

Binomial name
- Achlydosa glandulosa (Schltr.) M.A.Clem. & D.L.Jones

Synonyms
- Megastylis glandulosa (Schltr.) Schltr.

= Achlydosa =

Genus of flowering plants

Achlydosa glandulosa is a species of orchid endemic to New Caledonia and the only species of the genus Achlydosa. This species has previously been placed in the genus Megastylis. Its closest relative is Pterostylis, the sole other genus of subtribe Pterostylidinae.
