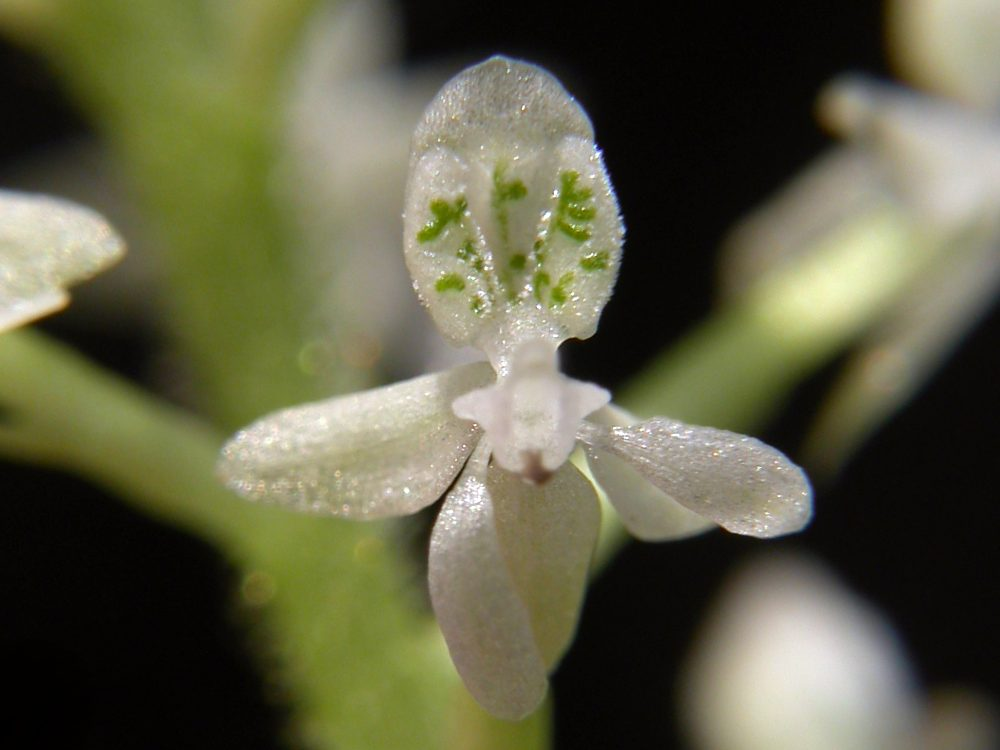
- Cranichis candida

Scientific classification
- Kingdom: Plantae
- Clade: Tracheophytes
- Clade: Angiosperms
- Clade: Monocots
- Order: Asparagales
- Family: Orchidaceae
- Subfamily: Orchidoideae
- Tribe: Cranichideae
- Subtribe: Cranichidinae
- Genus: Cranichis; Sw., Prodr. Veg. Ind. Occ.: 120 (1788)

Synonyms
- Cystochilum Barb.Rodr.; Nezahualcoyotlia R.González

= Cranichis =

Genus of orchids

Cranichis is a genus of flowering plants from the orchid family, Orchidaceae. It contains about 50 species, native to South America, Central America, Mexico and the West Indies, with one species (C. muscosa) extending into Florida.

== Species ==
- Cranichis acuminatissima
- Cranichis amplectens
- Cranichis antioquiensis
- Cranichis apiculata
- Cranichis brachyblephara
- Cranichis callifera
- Cranichis calva
- Cranichis candida
- Cranichis castellanosii
- Cranichis ciliata
- Cranichis ciliilabia
- Cranichis cochleata
- Cranichis crumenifera
- Cranichis diphylla
- Cranichis elliptica
- Cranichis engelii
- Cranichis fendleri
- Cranichis foliosa
- Cranichis galatea
- Cranichis garayana
- Cranichis gibbosa
- Cranichis glabricaulis
- Cranichis glandulosa
- Cranichis gracilis
- Cranichis hassleri
- Cranichis hieroglyphica
- Cranichis lankesteri
- Cranichis lehmanniana
- Cranichis lehmannii
- Cranichis lichenophila
- Cranichis longipetiolata
- Cranichis macroblepharis
- Cranichis muscosa
- Cranichis notata
- Cranichis nudilabia
- Cranichis ovata
- Cranichis parvula
- Cranichis picta
- Cranichis polyantha
- Cranichis pulvinifera
- Cranichis reticulata
- Cranichis revoluta
- Cranichis ricartii
- Cranichis saccata
- Cranichis scripta
- Cranichis sparrei
- Cranichis subumbellata
- Cranichis sylvatica
- Cranichis talamancana
- Cranichis tenuis
- Cranichis turkeliae
- Cranichis wageneri
- Cranichis werffii
