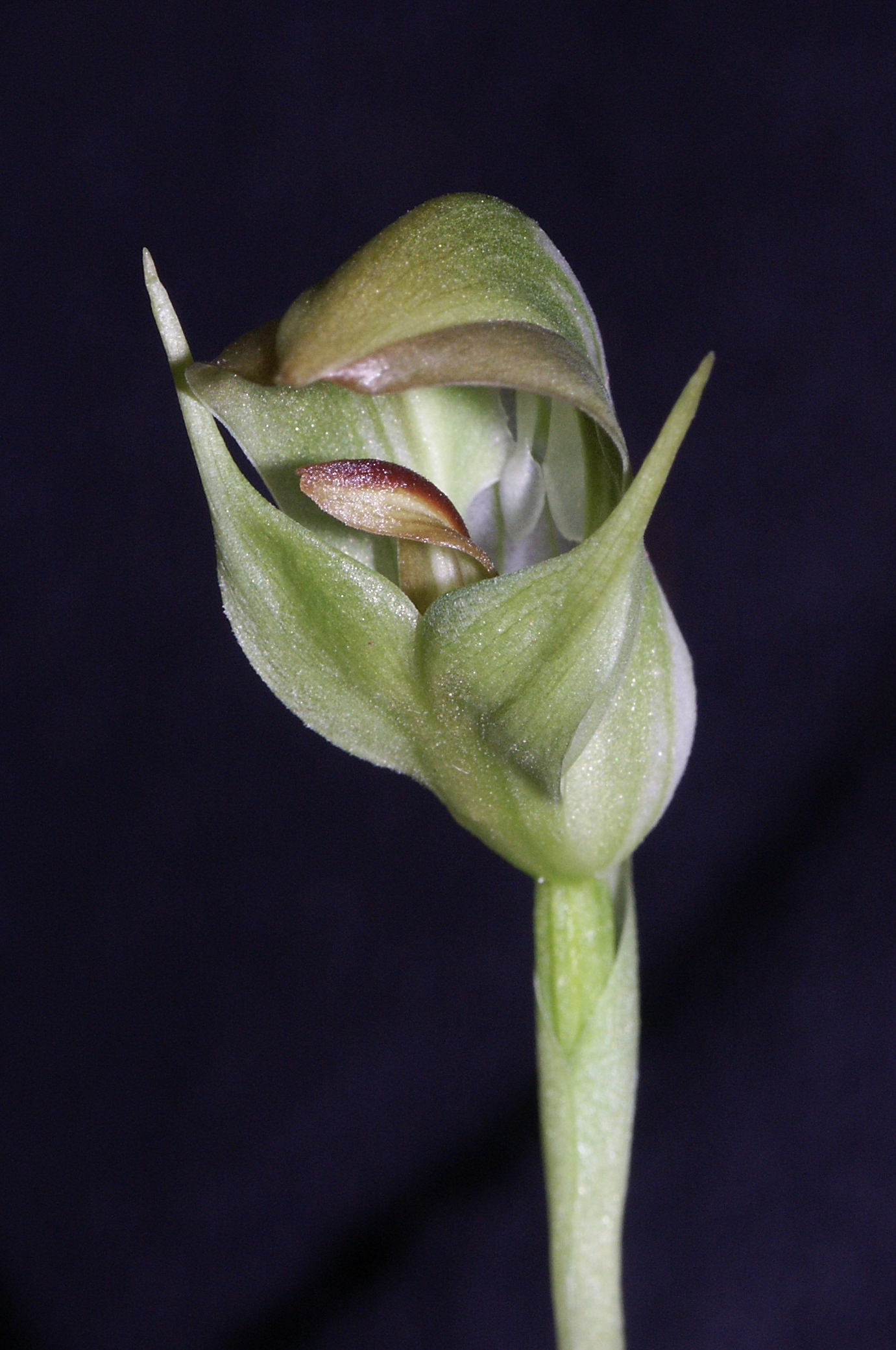
- Pterostylis curta

Scientific classification
- Kingdom: Plantae
- Clade: Tracheophytes
- Clade: Angiosperms
- Clade: Monocots
- Order: Asparagales
- Family: Orchidaceae
- Subfamily: Orchidoideae
- Tribe: Cranichideae
- Subtribe: Pterostylidinae; Pfitzer

Genera
- Achlydosa; Pterostylis

= Pterostylidinae =

Subtribe of orchids

Pterostylidinae is an orchid subtribe in the tribe Cranichideae.

== See also ==
- Taxonomy of the Orchidaceae
