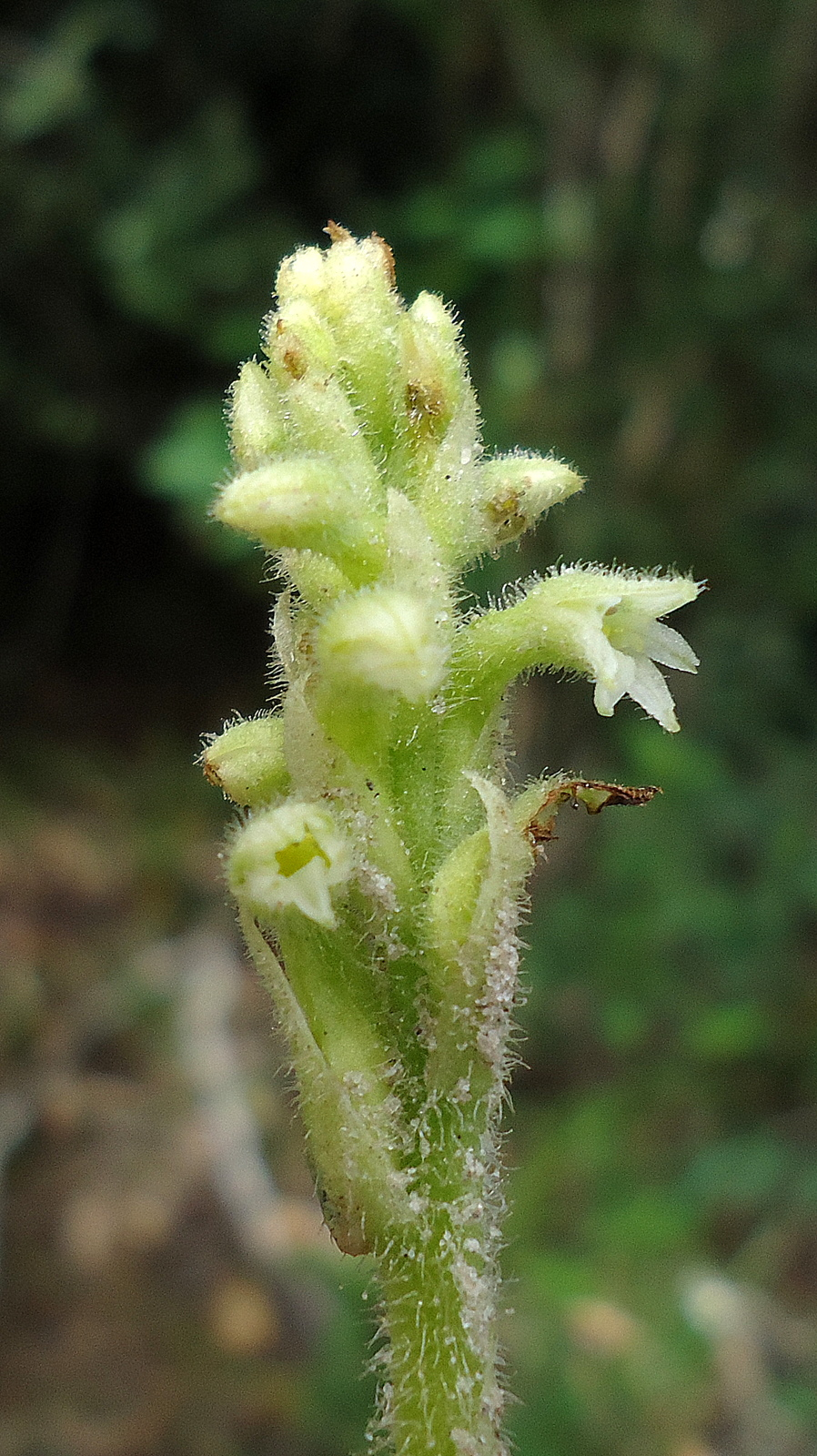

Scientific classification
- Kingdom: Plantae
- Clade: Tracheophytes
- Clade: Angiosperms
- Clade: Monocots
- Order: Asparagales
- Family: Orchidaceae
- Subfamily: Orchidoideae
- Tribe: Cranichideae
- Subtribe: Discyphinae; Salazar & Van den Berg
- Genus: Discyphus; Schltr.
- Species: D. scopulariae

Binomial name
- Discyphus scopulariae (Rchb.f.) Schltr.

Synonyms
- Dikylikostigma Kraenzl.; Spiranthes scopulariae Rchb.f.; Gyrostachys scopulariae (Rchb.f.) Kuntze; Dikylikostigma preussii Kraenzl.

= Discyphus =

Genus of orchids

Discyphus is a genus of flowering plants from the orchid family, Orchidaceae. It is the only genus in the subtribe Discyphinae of the tribe Cranichideae. It contains only one currently recognized species, Discyphus scopulariae, with two accepted varieties:

- Discyphus scopulariae var. longiauriculata Szlach. - Trinidad
- Discyphus scopulariae var. scopulariae - Trinidad, Panama, Venezuela, Brazil
