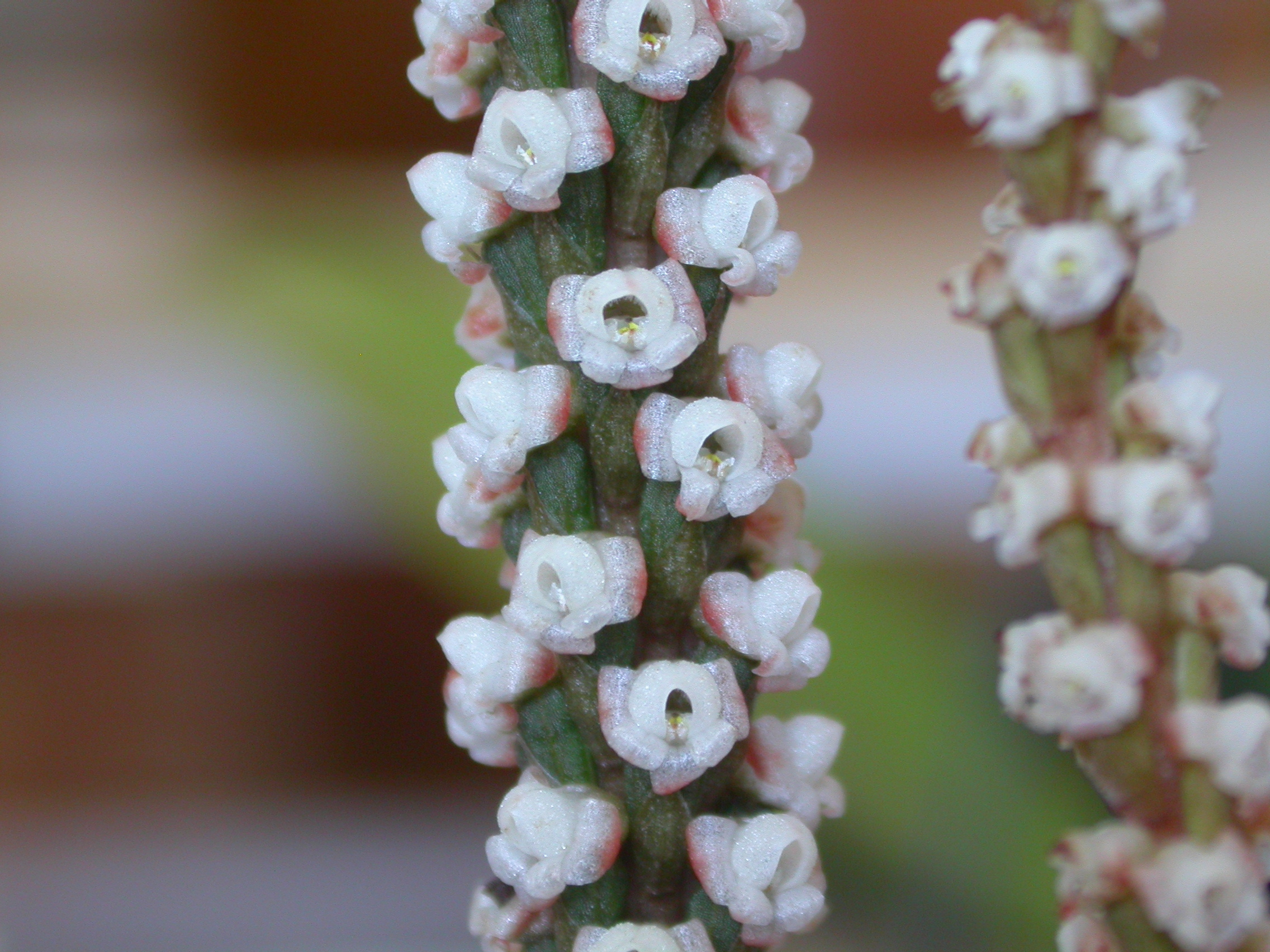
- Prescottia oligantha

Scientific classification
- Kingdom: Plantae
- Clade: Embryophytes
- Clade: Tracheophytes
- Clade: Spermatophytes
- Clade: Angiosperms
- Clade: Monocots
- Order: Asparagales
- Family: Orchidaceae
- Subfamily: Orchidoideae
- Tribe: Cranichideae
- Subtribe: Cranichidinae
- Genus: Prescottia; Lindl.

Synonyms
- Decaisnea Brongn. in L.I.Duperrey

= Prescottia (plant) =

Genus of flowering plants

Prescottia is a genus of flowering plants from the orchid family, Orchidaceae. It is widespread across much of Latin America and the West Indies, with one species (P. oligantha) extending into Florida.

The name is sometimes misspelled as Prescotia, including in the original generic description. The genus was named for John Prescott, so is to be spelled with a double t per ICN.

As of December 2025, Plants of the World Online accepts the following 25 species:

- Prescottia auyantepuiensis Carnevali & G.A.Romero
- Prescottia carnosa C.Schweinf.
- Prescottia congesta Pupulin
- Prescottia cordifolia Rchb.f.
- Prescottia densiflora (Brongn.) Lindl.
- Prescottia ecuadorensis C.O.Azevedo & Van den Berg
- Prescottia filiformis Schltr.
- Prescottia glazioviana Cogn.
- Prescottia gracilis Schltr.
- Prescottia lancifolia Lindl.
- Prescottia leptostachya Lindl.
- Prescottia lojana Dodson
- Prescottia montana Barb.Rodr.
- Prescottia mucugensis C.O.Azevedo & Van den Berg
- Prescottia nervosa Archila, Szlach. & Chiron
- Prescottia oligantha (Sw.) Lindl.
- Prescottia ostenii Pabst
- Prescottia petiolaris Lindl.
- Prescottia phleoides Lindl.
- Prescottia plantaginifolia Lindl. ex Hook.
- Prescottia polyphylla Porsch
- Prescottia sibundoyensis S.Nowak, Kolan., Medina Tr. & Szlach.
- Prescottia smithii Schltr.
- Prescottia spiranthophylla Barb.Rodr.
- Prescottia stachyodes (Sw.) Lindl.
