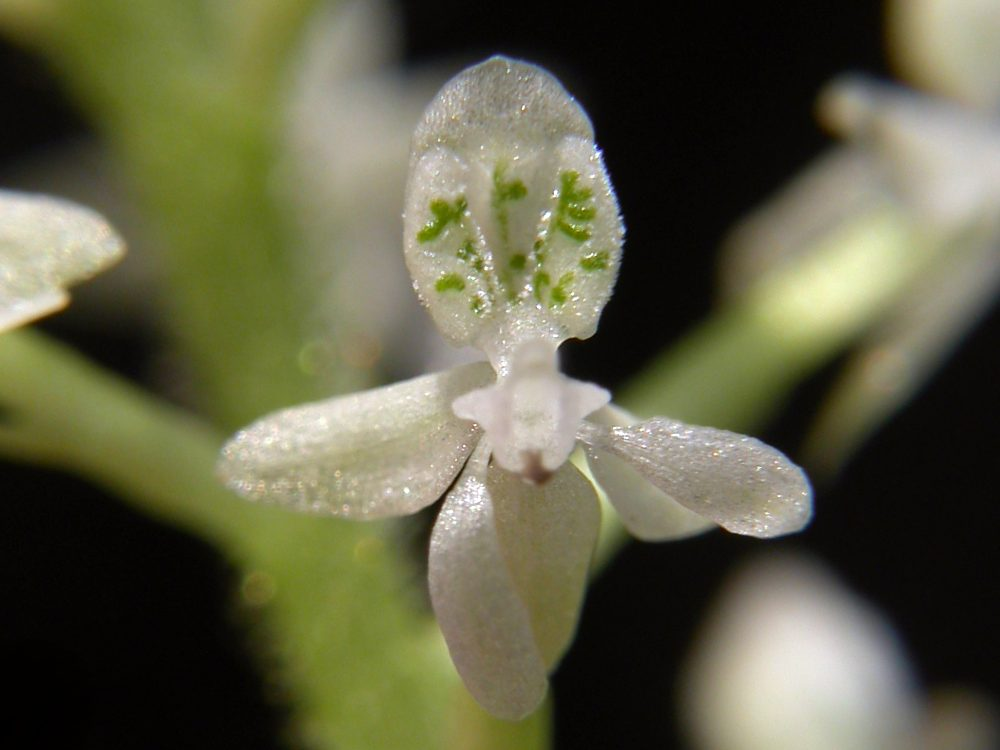

Scientific classification
- Kingdom: Plantae
- Clade: Tracheophytes
- Clade: Angiosperms
- Clade: Monocots
- Order: Asparagales
- Family: Orchidaceae
- Subfamily: Orchidoideae
- Tribe: Cranichideae
- Genus: Cranichis
- Species: C. candida

Binomial name
- Cranichis candida Cogn., 1895

= Cranichis candida =

Species of orchid

Cranichis candida is a species of orchid in the subfamily Orchidoideae.

It was described by Célestin Alfred Cogniaux.
