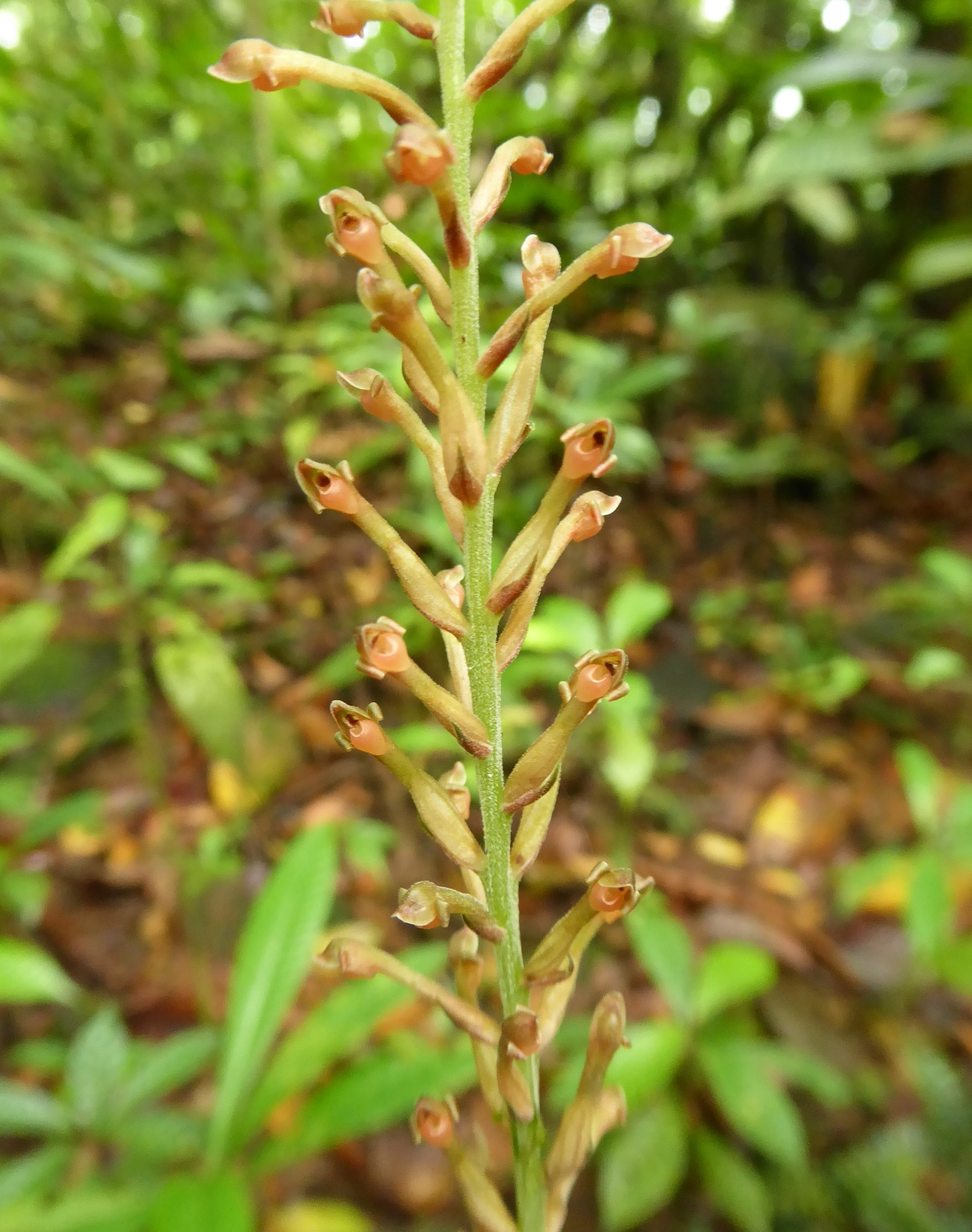
- Manniella gustavi

Scientific classification
- Kingdom: Plantae
- Clade: Embryophytes
- Clade: Tracheophytes
- Clade: Spermatophytes
- Clade: Angiosperms
- Clade: Monocots
- Order: Asparagales
- Family: Orchidaceae
- Subfamily: Orchidoideae
- Tribe: Cranichideae
- Subtribe: Manniellineae; Schltr.
- Genus: Manniella; Rchb.f., 1881

Type species
- Manniella gustavi Rchb.f., 1881

Species
- Manniella gustavi Rchb.f.; Manniella cypripedioides Salazar & al.

= Manniella (plant) =

Genus of orchids

Manniella is a genus of orchids (family Orchidaceae) belonging to the subfamily Orchidoideae.

It consists of two species: the type species Manniella gustavi Rchb.f. and Manniella cypripedioides, Salazar & al., both from West Africa. Because of its phylogenetic position as the sister of Neotropical subtribes Cranichidinae s.l. and Spiranthinae, its status as the sole genus in the subtribe Manniellineae is justified on evolutionary grounds.

The genus is named after Gustav Mann
