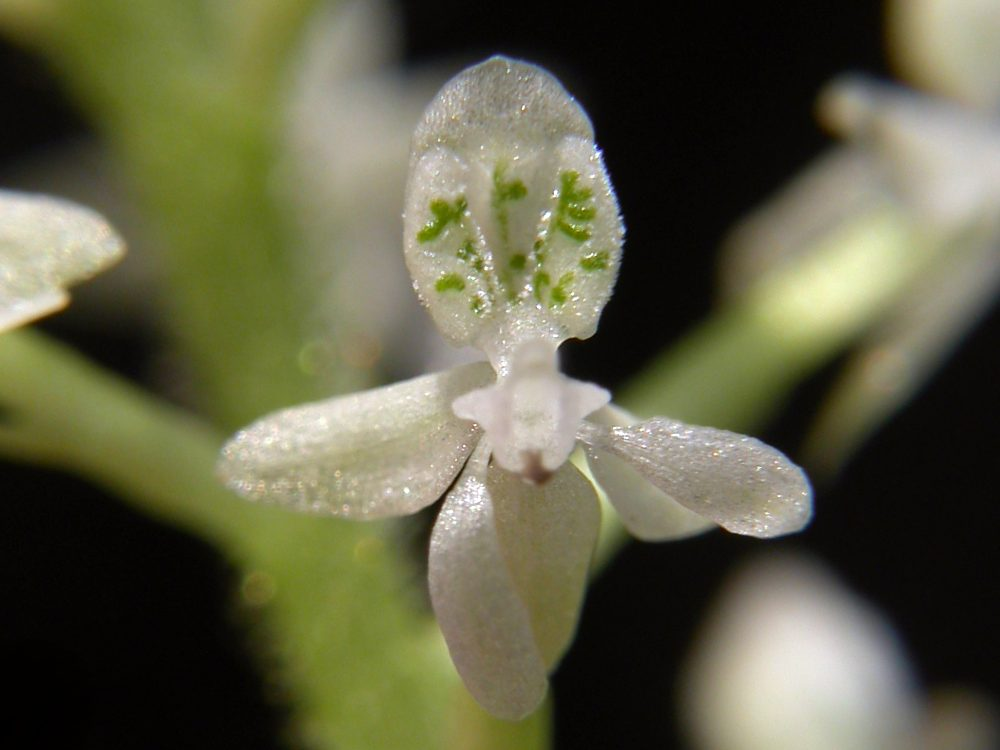
- Cranichis candida

Scientific classification
- Kingdom: Plantae
- Clade: Tracheophytes
- Clade: Angiosperms
- Clade: Monocots
- Order: Asparagales
- Family: Orchidaceae
- Subfamily: Orchidoideae
- Tribe: Cranichideae; Lindl. ex Meisn., Nomencl. Bot. 1(2): 901. (1873)

Subtribes
- Chloraeinae; Cranichidinae; Discyphinae; Galeottiellinae; Goodyerinae; Manniellinae; Pterostylidinae; Spiranthinae

= Cranichideae =

Tribe of orchids

Cranichideae is an orchid tribe in the subfamily Orchidoideae.

== See also ==
- Taxonomy of the Orchidaceae
