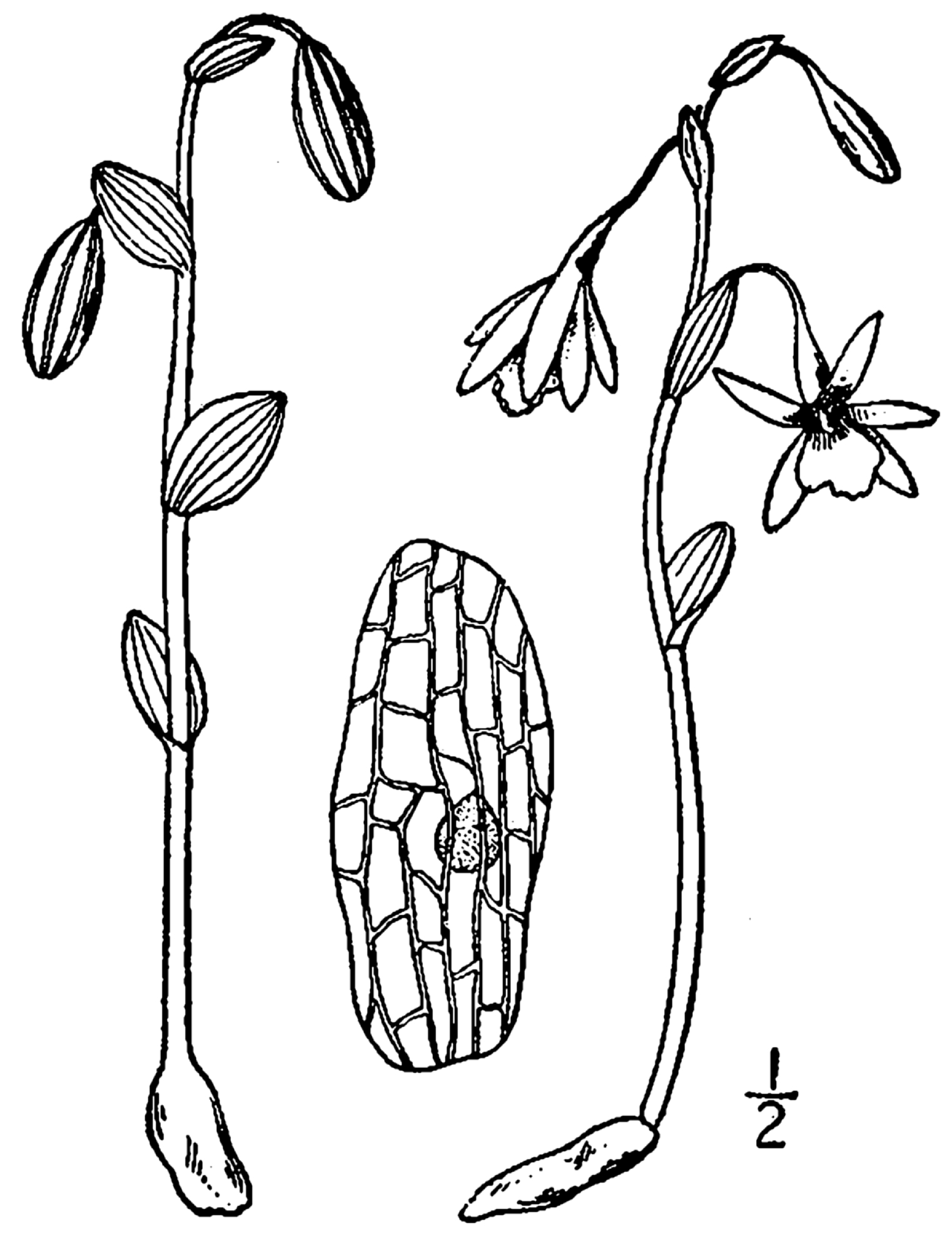
- Triphora trianthophoros

Scientific classification
- Kingdom: Plantae
- Clade: Tracheophytes
- Clade: Angiosperms
- Clade: Monocots
- Order: Asparagales
- Family: Orchidaceae
- Subfamily: Epidendroideae
- Tribe: Triphoreae
- Subtribe: Triphorinae (Dressler) Szlach. Folia. Geobot. Phytotax. 26, 325. (1991)

Genera
- Monophyllorchis; Pogoniopsis; Psilochilus; Triphora

= Triphorinae =

Subtribe of orchids

Triphorinae is an orchid subtribe in the tribe Triphoreae.

== See also ==
- Taxonomy of the Orchidaceae
