= Triphora =

Triphora is the generic name of two groups of organisms. It can refer to:

- Triphora (gastropod), a genus of sea snails in the family Triphoridae
- Triphora (plant), a genus of plants in the family Orchidaceae
