= Diceratostele =

Scientific classification
- Kingdom: Plantae
- Clade: Tracheophytes
- Clade: Angiosperms
- Clade: Monocots
- Order: Asparagales
- Family: Orchidaceae
- Subfamily: Epidendroideae
- Tribe: Triphoreae
- Subtribe: Diceratostelinae; Szlach.
- Genus: Diceratostele; Summerh.
- Species: D. gabonensis

Binomial name
- Diceratostele gabonensis Summerh.

Genus of orchids

Diceratostele is a genus of flowering plants from the orchid family, Orchidaceae. At the present time (June 2014), there is only one known species, Diceratostele gabonensis, native to western and central Africa (Gabon, Cameroon, Liberia, Ivory Coast and Congo-Kinshasa).

== See also ==
- List of Orchidaceae genera
