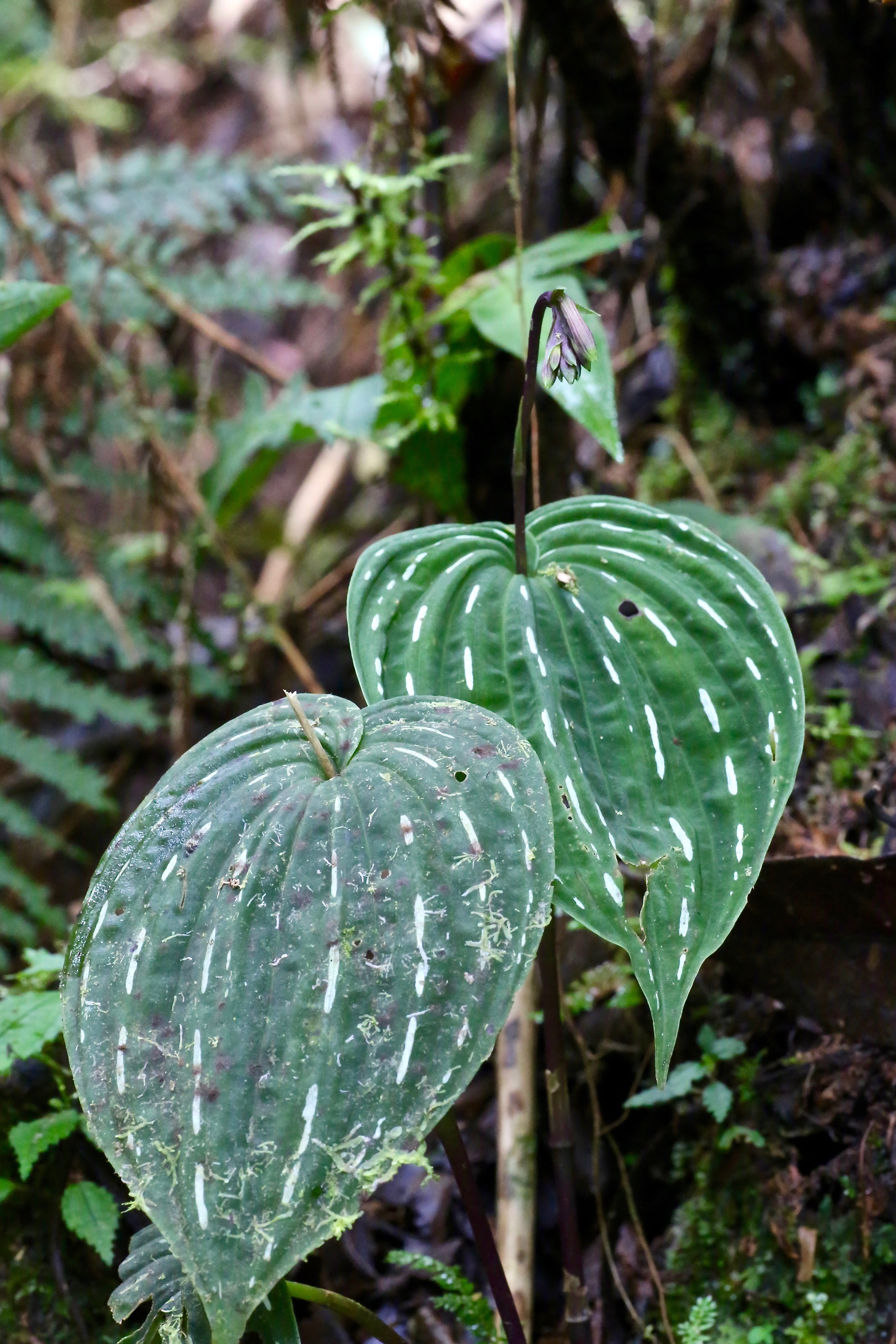

Scientific classification
- Kingdom: Plantae
- Clade: Tracheophytes
- Clade: Angiosperms
- Clade: Monocots
- Order: Asparagales
- Family: Orchidaceae
- Subfamily: Epidendroideae
- Tribe: Triphoreae
- Subtribe: Triphorinae
- Genus: Monophyllorchis; Schltr.
- Species: M. microstyloides

Binomial name
- Monophyllorchis microstyloides (Rchb.f.) Garay

Synonyms
- Monophyllorchis colombiana Schltr.; Monophyllorchis maculata Garay; Pogonia microstyloides Rchb.f.

= Monophyllorchis =

Genus of orchids

Monophyllorchis is a monotypic genus of flowering plants from the orchid family, Orchidaceae. The sole species is Monophyllorchis microstyloides, native to Costa Rica, Nicaragua, Colombia and Ecuador.

== See also ==
- List of Orchidaceae genera
