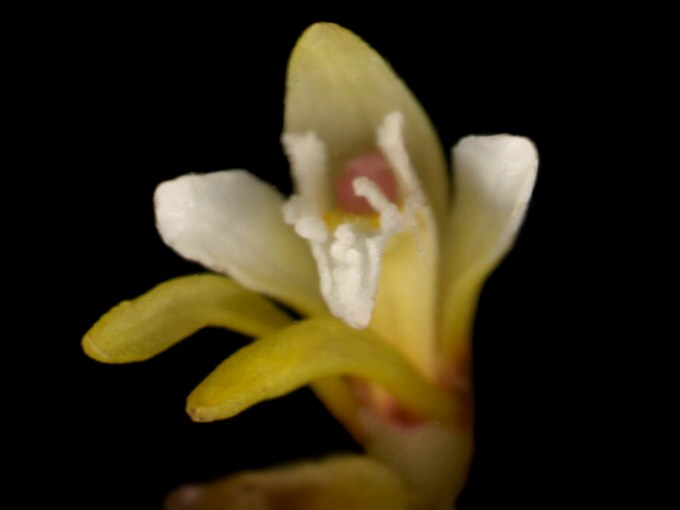
- Pogoniopsis schenkii

Scientific classification
- Kingdom: Plantae
- Clade: Tracheophytes
- Clade: Angiosperms
- Clade: Monocots
- Order: Asparagales
- Family: Orchidaceae
- Subfamily: Epidendroideae
- Tribe: Triphoreae
- Subtribe: Triphorinae
- Genus: Pogoniopsis; Rchb.f.

= Pogoniopsis =

Genus of orchids

Pogoniopsis is a genus of orchids (family Orchidaceae). It contains two known species, both endemic to Brazil. It was previously included in the subfamily Vanilloideae, but is now placed in the tribe Triphoreae of the subfamily Epidendroideae.

- Pogoniopsis nidus-avis Rchb.f.
- Pogoniopsis schenkii Cogn. in C.F.P.von Martius
