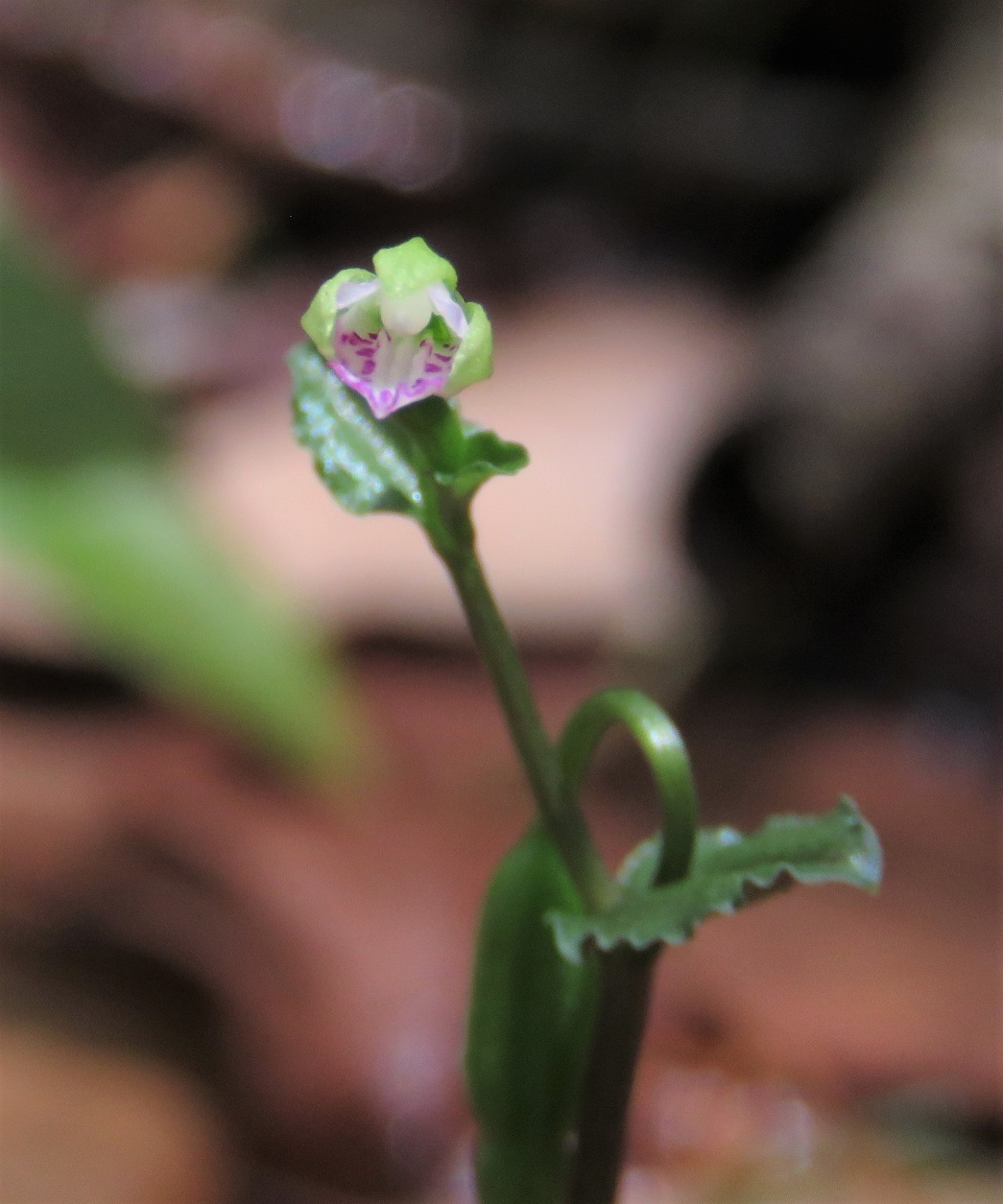

Conservation status
- Critically Imperiled (NatureServe)

Scientific classification
- Kingdom: Plantae
- Clade: Tracheophytes
- Clade: Angiosperms
- Clade: Monocots
- Order: Asparagales
- Family: Orchidaceae
- Subfamily: Epidendroideae
- Genus: Triphora
- Species: T. craigheadii

Binomial name
- Triphora craigheadii Luer

= Triphora craigheadii =

Species of flowering plant

Triphora craigheadii, commonly referred to as Craighead's noddingcaps, is a species of orchid endemic to peninsular Florida, United States. Today it is only known from Citrus and Hernando counties. Historic occurrences from Sumter and Collier counties are recorded, though these may no longer be extant.

== Habitat ==
It is only known from heavily shaded hydric/mesic hammocks in proximity to limestone outcroppings.

== Conservation ==
Known threats include habitat loss, pressure from invasive species, and poaching for the orchid horticultural trade.
