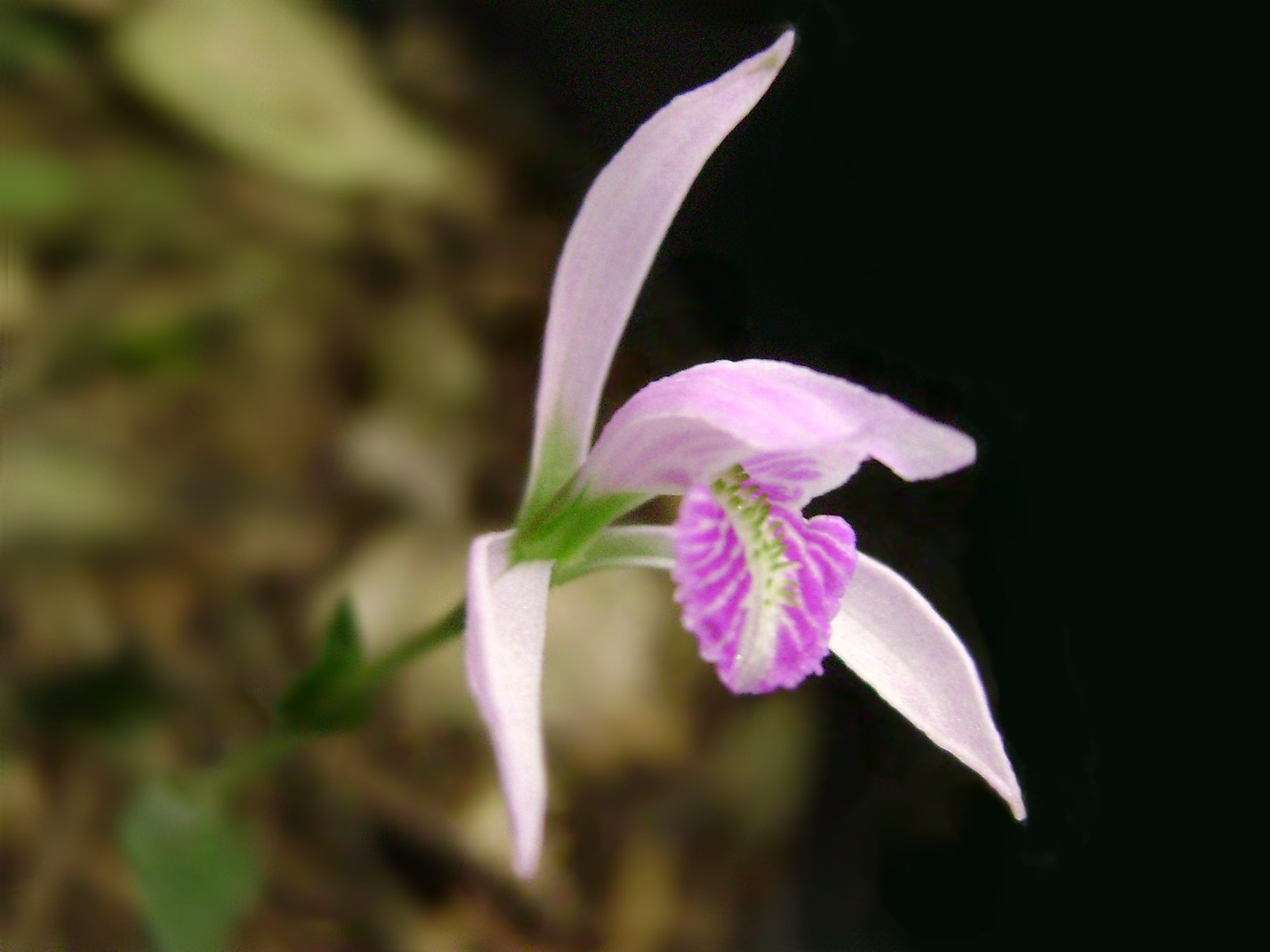
- Triphora uniflora

Scientific classification
- Kingdom: Plantae
- Clade: Tracheophytes
- Clade: Angiosperms
- Clade: Monocots
- Order: Asparagales
- Family: Orchidaceae
- Subfamily: Epidendroideae
- Tribe: Triphoreae; Dressler (1979) Selbyana, 5, 197-206 (1979)

Subtribes and genera
- Diceratostelinae; Diceratostele; Triphorinae; Monophyllorchis; Pogoniopsis; Psilochilus; Triphora

= Triphoreae =

Tribe of orchids

Triphoreae is an orchid tribe in the subfamily Epidendroideae.

== See also ==
- Taxonomy of the Orchidaceae
