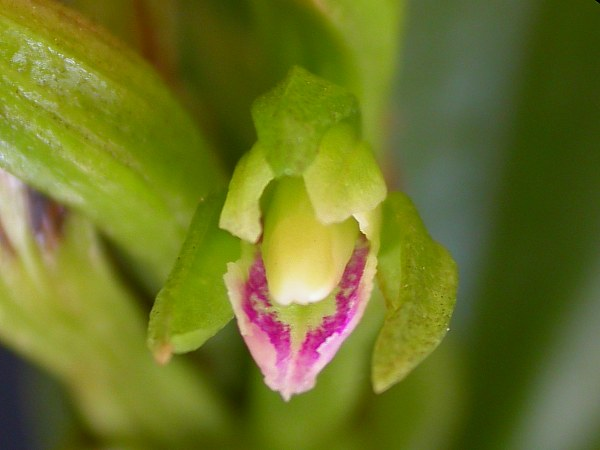
- Psilochilus modestus

Scientific classification
- Kingdom: Plantae
- Clade: Tracheophytes
- Clade: Angiosperms
- Clade: Monocots
- Order: Asparagales
- Family: Orchidaceae
- Subfamily: Epidendroideae
- Tribe: Triphoreae
- Subtribe: Triphorinae
- Genus: Psilochilus; Barb.Rodr.

= Psilochilus =

Genus of orchids

Psilochilus is a genus of flowering plants from the orchid family, Orchidaceae. It is native to South America, Central America, Mexico and the West Indies.

1. Psilochilus carinatus Garay - Colombia
2. Psilochilus dusenianus Kraenzl. ex Garay & Dunst. - Venezuela, Brazil
3. Psilochilus macrophyllus (Lindl.) Ames - widespread from central Mexico and the West indies south to Peru
4. Psilochilus maderoi (Schltr.) Schltr. - Colombia
5. Psilochilus modestus Barb.Rodr. - Venezuela, Brazil
6. Psilochilus mollis Garay - Ecuador
7. Psilochilus physurifolius (Rchb.f.) Løjtnant - Venezuela, Guyana
8. Psilochilus vallecaucanus Kolan. & Szlach. - Colombia

== See also ==
- List of Orchidaceae genera
