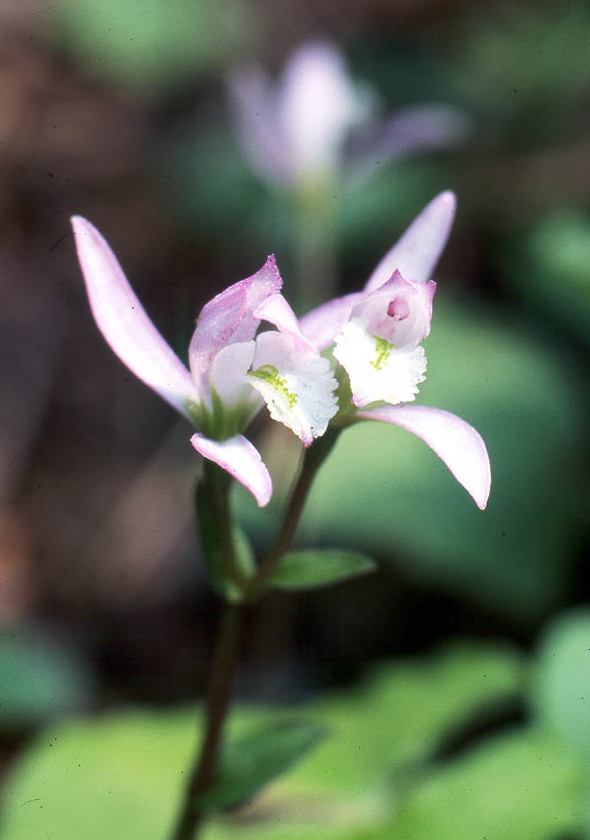

Scientific classification
- Kingdom: Plantae
- Clade: Tracheophytes
- Clade: Angiosperms
- Clade: Monocots
- Order: Asparagales
- Family: Orchidaceae
- Subfamily: Epidendroideae
- Genus: Triphora
- Species: T. trianthophoros

Binomial name
- Triphora trianthophoros (Sw.) Rydb.

= Triphora trianthophoros =

Species of orchid

Triphora trianthophoros, the threebirds or three birds orchid, or nodding pogonia, is a species of terrestrial orchid native to eastern North America.

== Description ==
Triphora trianthophoros is a small, terrestrial, semi-saprophytic orchid. The showiest member of its genus, T. trianthophoros has 1-8 (often 3, thus the name) nodding flowers that are roughly 2 cm in size and sit atop stems 8–25 cm tall. Leaves are small (~1 cm X 1.5 cm) and typically dark green to purple. The leafs are arranged in an alternate pattern and a lobed labellum is present. The orchid blooms from July through September, but is infamous for its elusive nature, with ephemeral flowers lasting for only several hours on a few days of the year. It has been noted that this plant only produces flowers in years during which the conditions are favourable. It has further been reported that populations across a region synchronize blooming on specific days, making observation of flowering specimens even more difficult. The seeds of T. trianthophoros are dispersed by wind (anemochory).

There are two subsepcies of this orchid: Triphora trianthophoros (found throughout the USA and Ontario) and Triphora trianthophoros mexicana (found in Mexico and Central America). Several color forms of T. trianthophoros exist, including forma albidoflava (Keenan) with white flowers, forma caerulea (P.M. Brown) with blue flowers, and forma rossii (P.M. Brown) with multi-colored flowers.

== Habitat, Range and Status Listings ==
Triphora trianthophoros is native to the eastern North America, ranging from as far south as Panama and north through Central America and the central and eastern United States into Ontario. Despite its wide distribution, the species is rare throughout much of its range and has been given G3G4 (secured, but with cause for concern) conservation status by NatureServe. In the United States, it is listed as rare or extremely rare in the New England states.

In Canada, T. trianthophoros was listed as endangered in 2010 under Canada's Species At Risk Act and Ontario's Endangered Species Act the following year. Its Canadian range is limited to two small populations in the Carolinian zone of Southwestern Ontario discovered in 1950, however one of which has not been seen since 1987. In Canada, under the Accord for the Protection of Species at Risk, recovery efforts are being made to seize the population decline of T. trianthophoros. It has only been rarely observed in one of them since 2008, Rondeau Provincial Park. Despite it is only being seen in one remaining population, it is still considered extant at the other since the species may remain underground and a lack of landowner permission has stopped searches at the site. It is considered to be at the northern limit of its range in Ontario.

Triphora trianthophoros is predominantly found in mixed hardwood forests with a deep humus layer, however the species also appears in floodplain forests and the margins of bogs or swamps within its range. It is shade-tolerant. It is also most commonly found in areas with no competing plant species and under leaf litter.

Co-located species often include partridgeberry, maple, and beech trees, and many mycorrhizal associations in the soil microbiome, which are hypothesized to help supplement nutrients under the closed-canopy conditions. T. trianthophoros occurrences are frequently positively correlated with beech spp. occurrences, suggesting a potential plant+fungi+plant interaction of nutrient and photosynthate sharing between the plant species via mycorrhizae.

== Threats ==
The central threat contributing to endangerment of Nodding pogonia are invasive species, including other invasive understory plants (Japanese barberry and garlic mustard in Ontario), invasive earthworms that degrade the organic forest soils and herbivory from white-tailed deer.

Any bottlenecking event also threatens this species survival, because they're populations are often small subpopulations or metapopulations. T. trianthophoros commonly reproduce asexually via secondary tuberoids which shrinks the gene pool, a second characteristic that risks genetic diversity loss at the hands of a genetic drift event.
