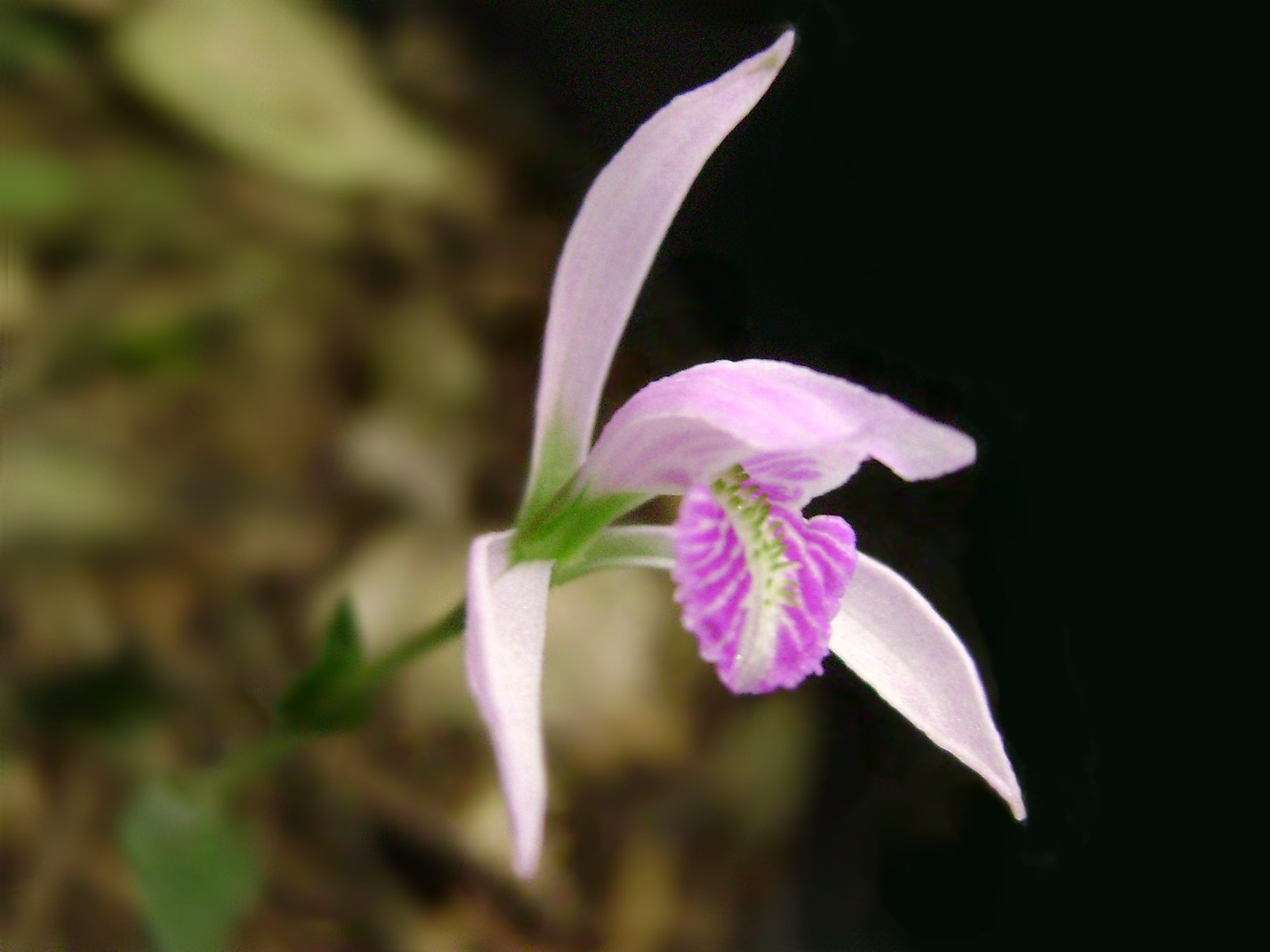
- Triphora uniflora

Scientific classification
- Kingdom: Plantae
- Clade: Tracheophytes
- Clade: Angiosperms
- Clade: Monocots
- Order: Asparagales
- Family: Orchidaceae
- Subfamily: Epidendroideae
- Tribe: Triphoreae
- Subtribe: Triphorinae
- Genus: Triphora; Nutt.

= Triphora (plant) =

Genus of orchids

Triphora is a genus of flowering plants from the orchid family, Orchidaceae. It is native to South America, Central America, southern Mexico, the West Indies and eastern North America as far north as Ontario. Noddingcaps is a common name for plants in this genus.

- Triphora amazonica Schltr. - Florida, Caribbean, south to Brazil
- Triphora carnosula (Rchb.f.) Schltr. - Brazil
- Triphora craigheadii Luer - Florida
- Triphora debilis (Schltr.) Schltr. - southern Mexico, Costa Rica, Guatemala, Panama
- Triphora duckei Schltr. - Brazil
- Triphora foldatsii Carnevali - Venezuela
- Triphora gentianoides (Sw.) Nutt. ex Ames & Schltr. - Florida, Southern Mexico, Costa Rica, Venezuela, Colombia, Ecuador, Bahamas, Greater Antilles
- Triphora hassleriana (Cogn. ex Chodat & Hassl.) Schltr. - from Mexico to Argentina
- Triphora heringeri Pabst - Brazil
- Triphora miserrima (Cogn.) Acuña - Cuba, Hispaniola
- Triphora nitida (Schltr.) Schltr. - Costa Rica
- Triphora pusilla (Rchb.f. & Warm.) Schltr. - Brazil
- Triphora ravenii (L.O.Williams) Garay - Costa Rica, Panama
- Triphora santamariensis Portalet - Brazil
- Triphora surinamensis (Lindl. ex Benth.) Britton - West Indies south to Brazil
- Triphora trianthophoros (Sw.) Rydb. Ontario, Eastern United States, much of Mexico
- Triphora uniflora A.W.C.Ferreira, Baptista & Pansarin - Brazil
- Triphora wagneri Schltr. - from Mexico to Ecuador
- Triphora yucatanensis Ames - Florida and the Yucatán Peninsula

== See also ==
- List of Orchidaceae genera
