= Ophioglossella =

Scientific classification
- Kingdom: Plantae
- Clade: Tracheophytes
- Clade: Angiosperms
- Clade: Monocots
- Order: Asparagales
- Family: Orchidaceae
- Subfamily: Epidendroideae
- Tribe: Vandeae
- Subtribe: Aeridinae
- Genus: Ophioglossella; Schuit. & Ormerod
- Species: O. chrysostoma

Binomial name
- Ophioglossella chrysostoma Schuit. & Ormerod
- Distribution of Ophioglossella

Flowering plant endemic to New Guinea

Ophioglossella is a monotypic genus of flowering plants belonging to the family Orchidaceae endemic to New Guinea. The sole species is Ophioglossella chrysostoma.

== Description ==
This species has been previously misidentified as member of the genera Sarcochilus, Pteroceras, Dryadorchis, and Grosourdya. Ophioglossella chrysostoma Schuit. & Ormerod is a small, short-stemmed, monopodial epiphyte with nearly sickle-shaped, twisted leaves, and sparsely to many-flowered racemes. The flowers are white with additional pink colouration. The labellum is mobile and does not possess a spur. The androecium consists of four pollinia.

== Ecology ==
It occurs at elevations of 1,700–2,300 metres (5,600–7,500 ft) above sea level in montane forests.

== Etymology ==
The specific epithet of the type species chrysostoma consists of chryso-, meaning golden, and -stoma meaning mouth. It refers to the golden inner side of the labellum.

== Conservation ==
This species appears to be widespread, but rare and appears to have a low numbers of individuals.
