= Sarcophyton =

Sarcophyton is the scientific name of several genera of organisms and may refer to:

- Sarcophyton (plant), a genus of plants in the family Orchidaceae
- Sarcophyton (coral), a genus of corals in the family Alcyoniidae
