= Stereochilus =

Stereochilus is the scientific name of two genera of organisms and may refer to:

- Stereochilus (amphibian), a genus of salamanders in the family Plethodontidae
- Stereochilus (plant), a genus of plants in the family Orchidaceae
