= Eclecticus =

Eclecticus may refer to:

- Eclecticus (amphipod), a genus of amphipods in the family Lysianassidae
- Eclecticus (plant), a genus of plants in the family Orchidaceae
