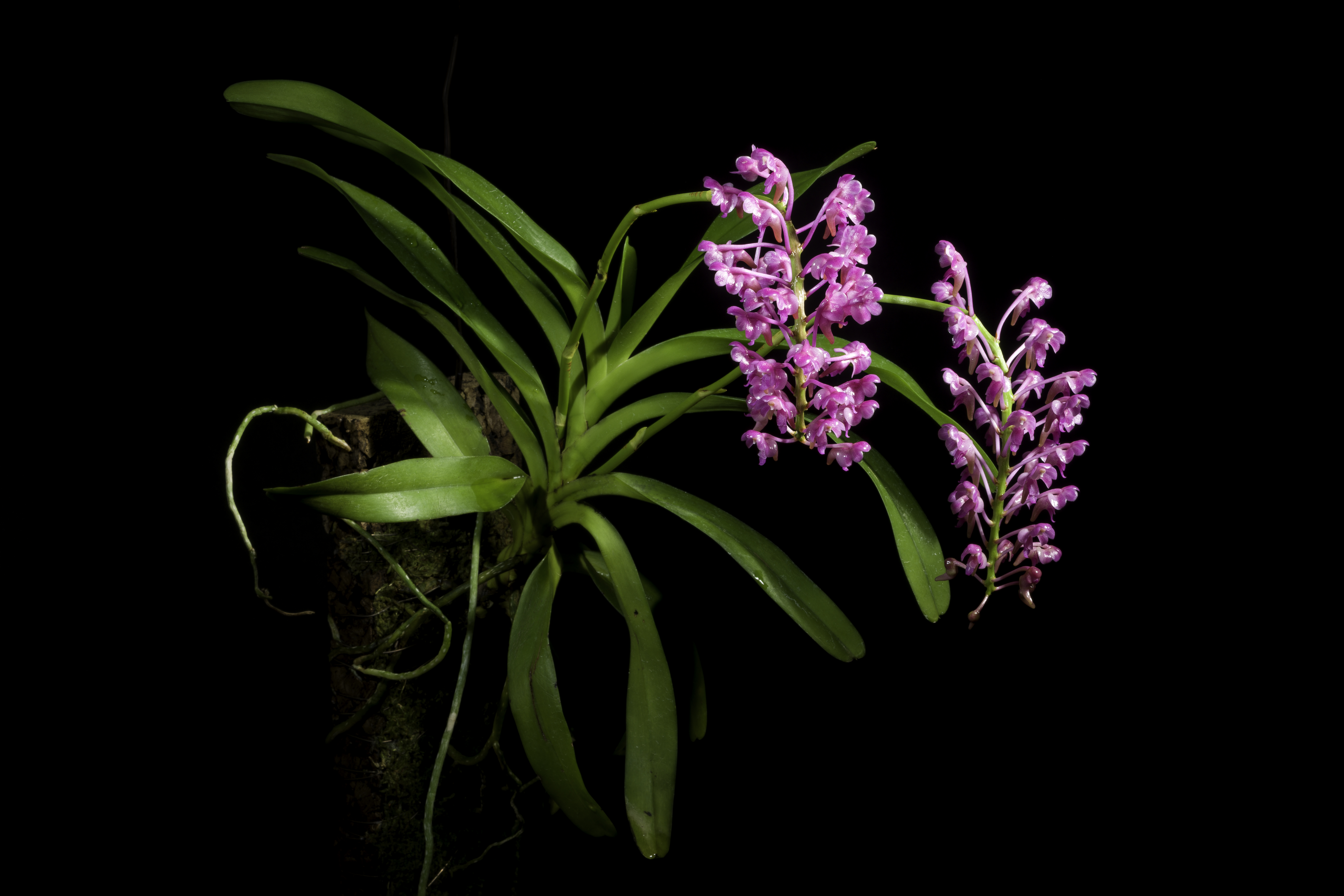
- Aerides leeana

Scientific classification
- Kingdom: Plantae
- Clade: Tracheophytes
- Clade: Angiosperms
- Clade: Monocots
- Order: Asparagales
- Family: Orchidaceae
- Subfamily: Epidendroideae
- Tribe: Vandeae
- Subtribe: Aeridinae; Pfitzer (1887)

Type genus
- Aerides Lour.

Genera
- See here

Synonyms
- Sarcanthinae Benth.; Vandinae Rchb.f.; Deceptorinae Szlach.; Diplocentrinae Szlach.; Gastrochilinae Szlach.; Pelatantheriinae Szlach.; Phalaenopsidinae Szlach.; Taeniophyllinae Szlach.

= Aeridinae =

Subtribe of orchids

In the botanical classification of plants, Aeridinae Pfitzer is a subtribe of the tribe Vandeae (Family Orchidaceae) whose representatives all have a monopodial growth habit and do not possess pseudobulbs.

This subtribe is a monophyletic group within Vandeae, and it contains more than 1,300 species in 103 genera, including about 208 (38%) hybrid genera. They occur mostly in Asia with a few in Africa. They are distinguished from the other subtribes of Vandeae by having an entire rostellum, a relatively small spur formed by the lip, and four (or two) pollinia.

Some of the genera it contains have some of the largest and most spectacular flowers in the whole of the orchid family. Also included in this subtribe are some of the most economically important genera in the horticultural trade, such as Phalaenopsis and Vanda.

== Leaflessness ==
Aeridinae contains the largest diversity of leafless taxa within the tribe Vandeae. These leafless species of the genera Chiloschista, Phalaenopsis, and Taeniophyllum (syn. Microtatorchis), which is the most species rich genus of Aeridinae with 245 accepted species, exhibit reduced stems and enhanced importance and photosynthetic function of the root system. This extreme reduction of leaves has likely evolved in three to four separate instances within Aeridinae. These leafless genera have a tight relationship with fungi of the Ceratobasidiaceae family. The roots of leafless epiphytic orchids are also heavily colonized by nitrogen-fixating cyanobacteria, which are thought to supply the plants with nitrogen.

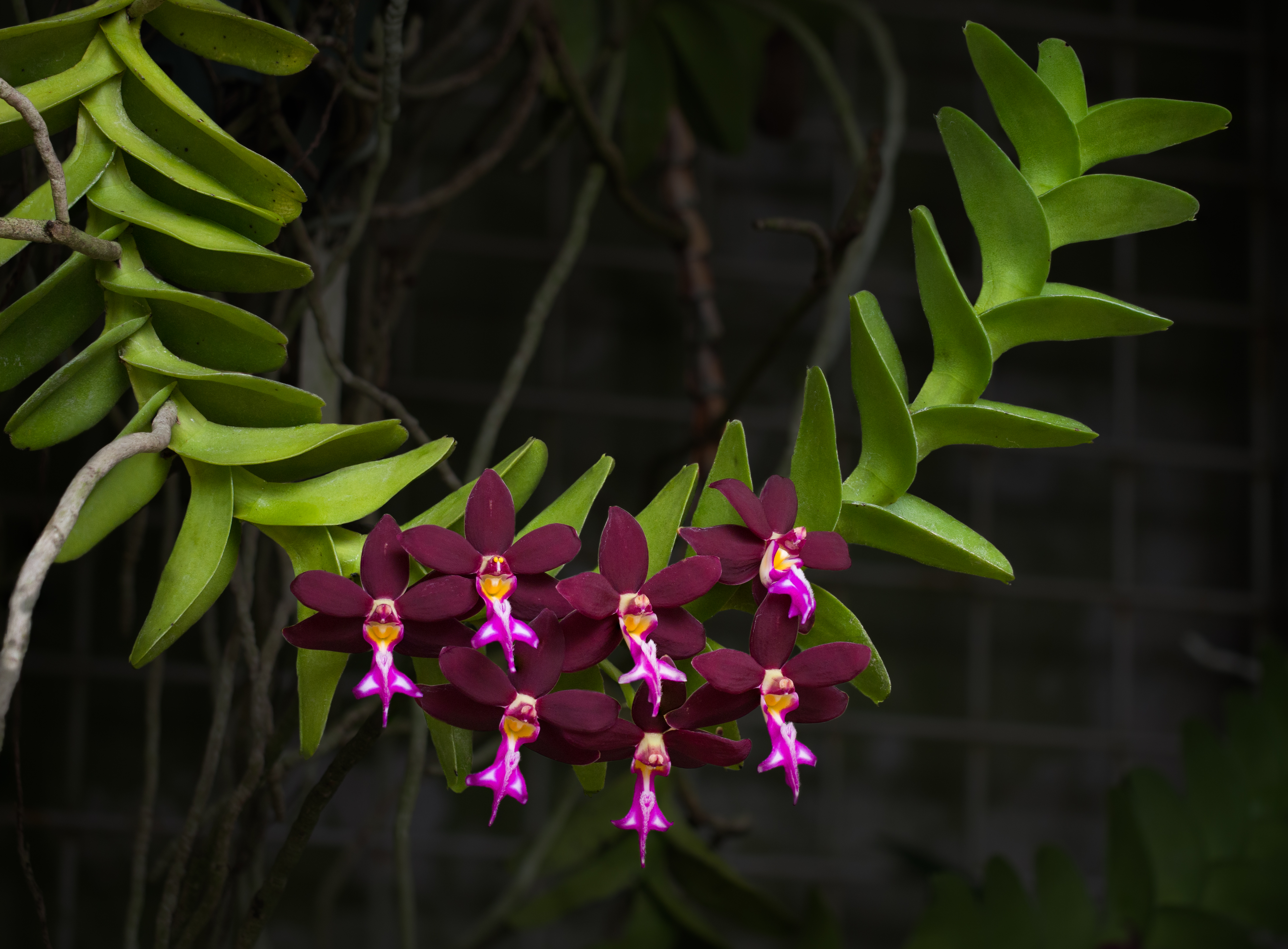
Trichoglottis atropurpurea

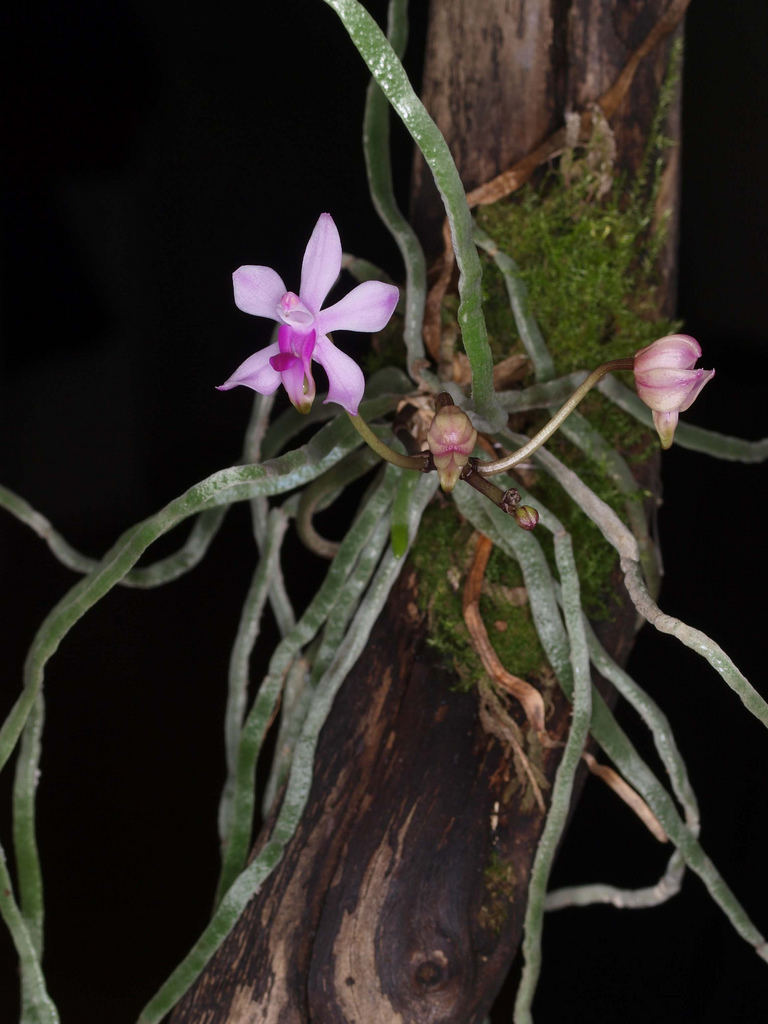
Flowering Phalaenopsis taenialis

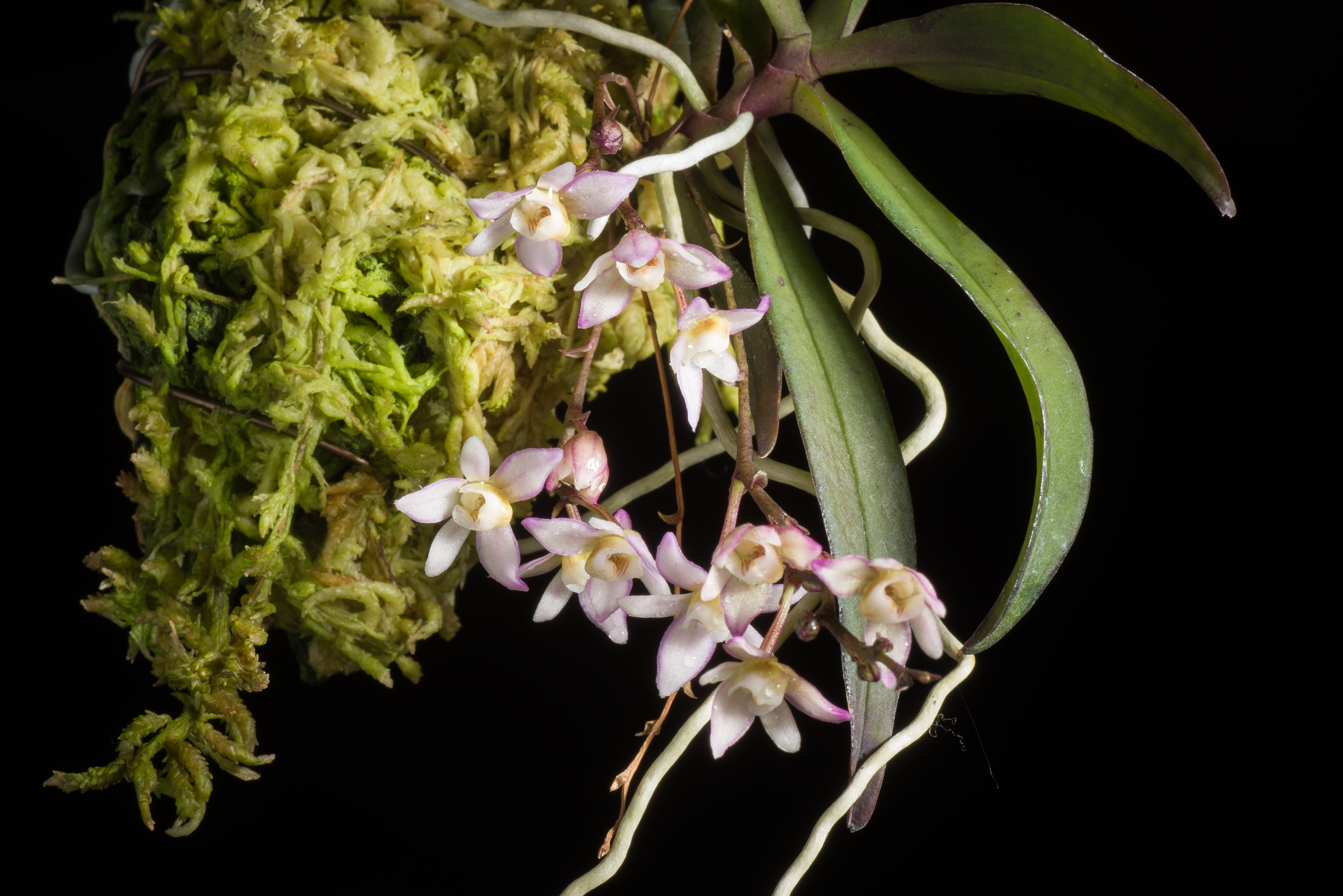
Thrixspermum saruwatarii

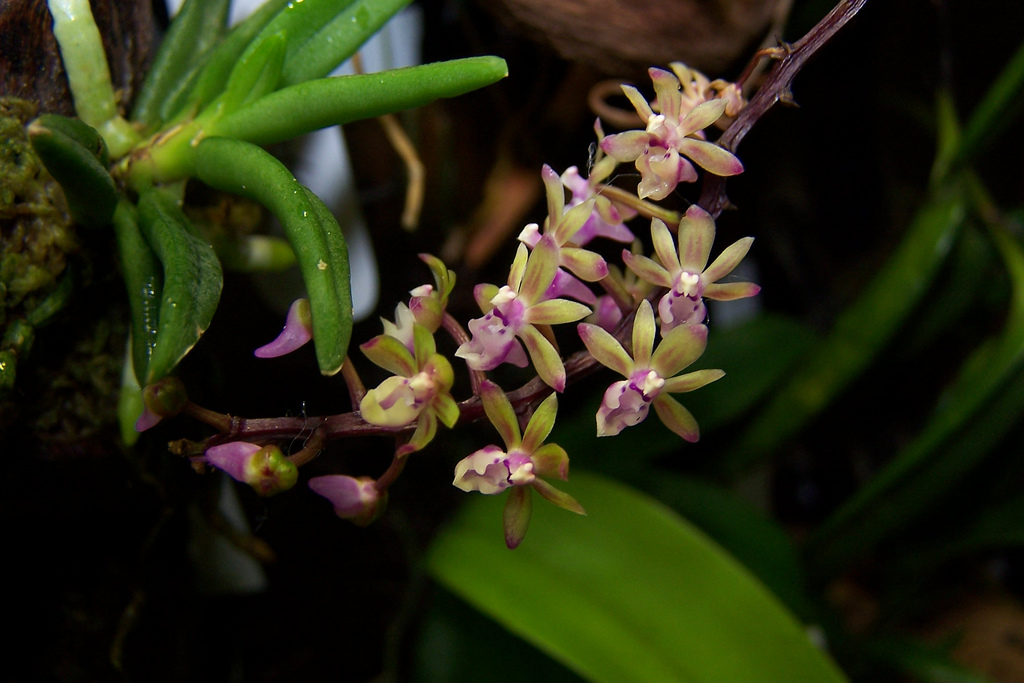
Cleisostoma crochetii

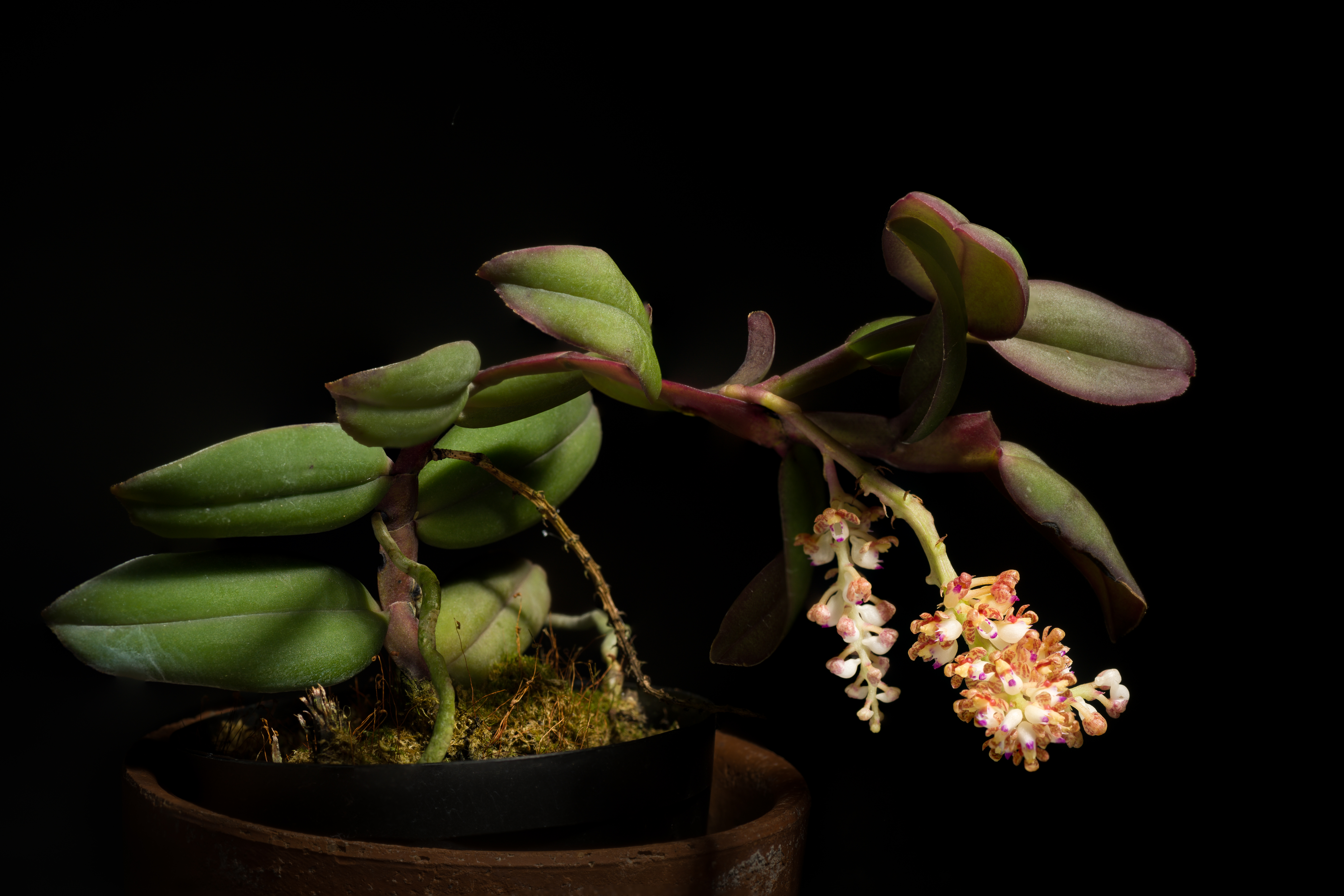
Robiquetia ilocosnortensis

== Taxonomy ==
It was published by Pfitzer in 1887 with Aerides Lour. as the type genus.
It has multiple synonyms:

- Deceptorinae Szlach.
- Diplocentrinae Szlach.
- Gastrochilinae Szlach.
- Pelatantheriinae Szlach.
- Phalaenopsidinae Szlach.
- Sarcanthinae Benth.
- Taeniophyllinae Szlach.
- Vandinae Rchb. f.

== Phylogeny ==
The subtribe Aeridinae is the sister group to the subtribe Angraecinae (incl. Aerangidinae):

- Vandeae s.l.
  - - - Aeridinae
      - Angraecinae (including Aerangidinae)
    - Adrorhizinae
  - Polystachyinae

== Genera ==
The following genera are accepted members of the subtribe Aeridinae according to Chase et al., 2015:

- Acampe Lindl.
- Adenoncos Blume
- Aerides Lour.
- Amesiella Schltr. ex Garay
- Arachnis Blume
- Biermannia King & Pantl.
- Bogoria J.J.Sm.
- Brachypeza Garay
- Calymmanthera Schltr.
- Ceratocentron Senghas
- Chamaeanthus Schltr.
- Chiloschista Lindl.
- Chroniochilus J.J.Sm.
- Cleisocentron Brühl
- Cleisomeria Lindl. ex D.Don
- Cleisostoma Blume
- Cleisostomopsis Seidenf.
- Cottonia Wight
- Cryptopylos Garay
- Deceptor Seidenf.
- Dimorphorchis Rolfe
- Diplocentrum Lindl.
- Diploprora Hook.f.
- Dryadorchis Schltr.
- Drymoanthus Nicholls
- Dyakia Christenson
- Eclecticus P.O’Byrne
- Gastrochilus D.Don
- Grosourdya Rchb.f.
- Gunnarella Senghas
- Holcoglossum Schltr.
- Hymenorchis Schltr.
- Jejewoodia Szlach.
- Luisia Gaudich.
- Macropodanthus L.O.Williams
- Micropera Lindl.
- Microsaccus Blume
- Mobilabium Rupp
- Omoea Blume
- Ophioglossella Schuit. & Ormerod
- Papilionanthe Schltr.
- Papillilabium Dockrill
- Paraphalaenopsis A.D.Hawkes
- Pelatantheria Ridl.
- Pennilabium J.J.Sm.
- Peristeranthus T.E.Hunt
- Phalaenopsis Blume
- Phragmorchis L.O.Williams
- Plectorrhiza Dockrill
- Pomatocalpa Breda
- Porrorhachis Garay
- Pteroceras Hassk.
- Renanthera Lour.
- Rhinerrhiza Rupp
- Rhinerrhizopsis Ormerod
- Rhynchogyna Seidenf. & Garay
- Rhynchostylis Blume
- Robiquetia Gaudich.
- Saccolabiopsis J.J.Sm.
- Saccolabium Blume
- Santotomasia Ormerod
- Sarcanthopsis Garay
- Sarcochilus R.Br.
- Sarcoglyphis Garay
- Sarcophyton Garay
- Schistotylus Dockrill
- Schoenorchis Reinw. ex Blume
- Seidenfadenia Garay
- Seidenfadeniella C.S.Kumar
- Singchia Z.J.Liu & L.J.Chen
- Smithsonia C.J.Saldanha
- Smitinandia Holttum
- Spongiola J.J.Wood & A.L.Lamb
- Stereochilus Lindl.
- Taeniophyllum Blume
- Taprobanea Christenson
- Thrixspermum Lour.
- Trachoma Garay
- Trichoglottis Blume
- Tuberolabium Yaman.
- Uncifera Lindl.
- Vanda R.Br.
- Vandopsis Pfitzer

However, this classification includes genera, which are not recognized by Plants of the World Online of the Royal Botanic Gardens, Kew:

- Cryptopylos Garay is a synonym of Macropodanthus L.O.Williams
- Papillilabium Dockrill is a synonym of Plectorrhiza Dockrill
- Rhinerrhizopsis Ormerod is a synonym of Bogoria J.J.Sm.
- Schistotylus Dockrill is a synonym of Plectorrhiza Dockrill
- Seidenfadeniella C.S.Kumar is a synonym of Cleisostomopsis Seidenf.
- Singchia Z.J.Liu & L.J.Chen is a synonym of Cleisocentron Brühl
- Spongiola J.J.Wood & A.Lamb is a synonym of Pennilabium J.J.Sm.

Additionally, some new genera have been recognized since the publication from Chase et al., 2015:

- Cymbilabia D.K.Liu & Ming H.Li
