= Pennilabium =

Scientific classification
- Kingdom: Plantae
- Clade: Tracheophytes
- Clade: Angiosperms
- Clade: Monocots
- Order: Asparagales
- Family: Orchidaceae
- Subfamily: Epidendroideae
- Tribe: Vandeae
- Subtribe: Aeridinae
- Genus: Pennilabium; J.J.Sm.

Genus of orchids

Pennilabium is a genus of flowering plants from the orchid family, Orchidaceae. It is native to Southeast Asia and the Himalayas.

- Pennilabium acuminatum (Ridl.) Holttum - Malaysia
- Pennilabium angraecoides (Schltr.) J.J.Sm. - Borneo
- Pennilabium angraecum (Ridl.) J.J.Sm. - Malaysia, Java
- Pennilabium armanii P.O'Byrne, Phoon & P.T.Ong - Malaysia
- Pennilabium aurantiacum J.J.Sm. - Java
- Pennilabium confusum (Ames) Garay - Philippines
- Pennilabium kidmancoxii J.J.Wood - Sabah
- Pennilabium lampongense J.J.Sm. - Sumatra
- Pennilabium longicaule J.J.Sm. - Sumatra
- Pennilabium luzonense (Ames) Garay - Philippines
- Pennilabium naja P.O'Byrne - Sulawesi
- Pennilabium poringense (J.J.Wood & A.L.Lamb) Schuit. - Sabah
- Pennilabium proboscidcum A.S.Rao & J.Joseph - Arunachal Pradesh, Assam
- Pennilabium struthio Carr - Malaysia, Thailand
- Pennilabium yunnanense S.C.Chen & Y.B.Luo - Yunnan, Thailand

== See also ==
- List of Orchidaceae genera
