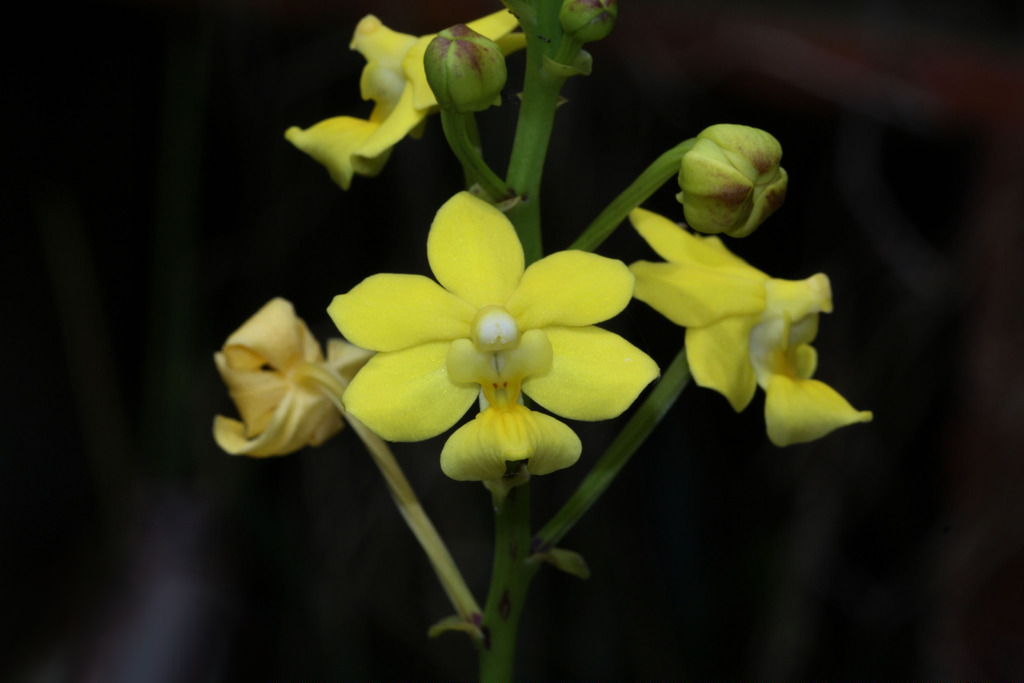

Scientific classification
- Kingdom: Plantae
- Clade: Tracheophytes
- Clade: Angiosperms
- Clade: Monocots
- Order: Asparagales
- Family: Orchidaceae
- Subfamily: Epidendroideae
- Tribe: Vandeae
- Subtribe: Aeridinae
- Genus: Taprobanea; Christenson
- Species: T. spathulata

Binomial name
- Taprobanea spathulata (L.) Christenson

Synonyms
- Epidendrum spathulatum L.; Limodorum spathulatum (L.) Willd.; Cymbidium spathulatum (L.) Moon; Vanda spathulata (L.) Spreng.; Aerides maculata Buch.-Ham. ex Sm. in A.Rees

= Taprobanea =

Genus of orchids

Taprobanea is a genus of flowering plants from the orchid family, Orchidaceae. There is only one known species, Taprobanea spathulata, native to India and to Sri Lanka.

== See also ==
- List of Orchidaceae genera
