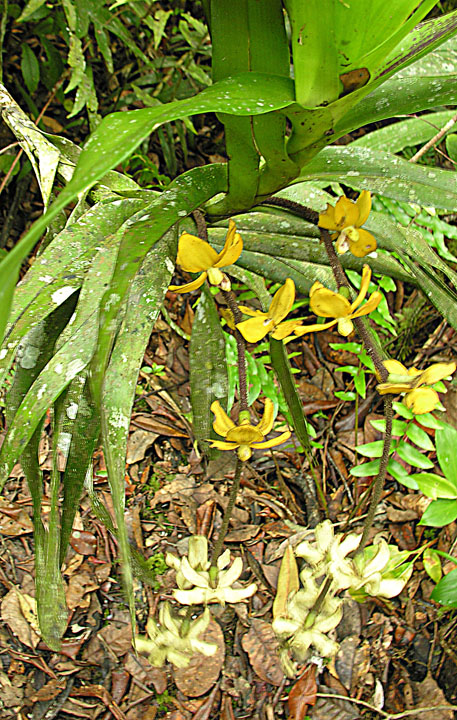
- Dimorphorchis rossii
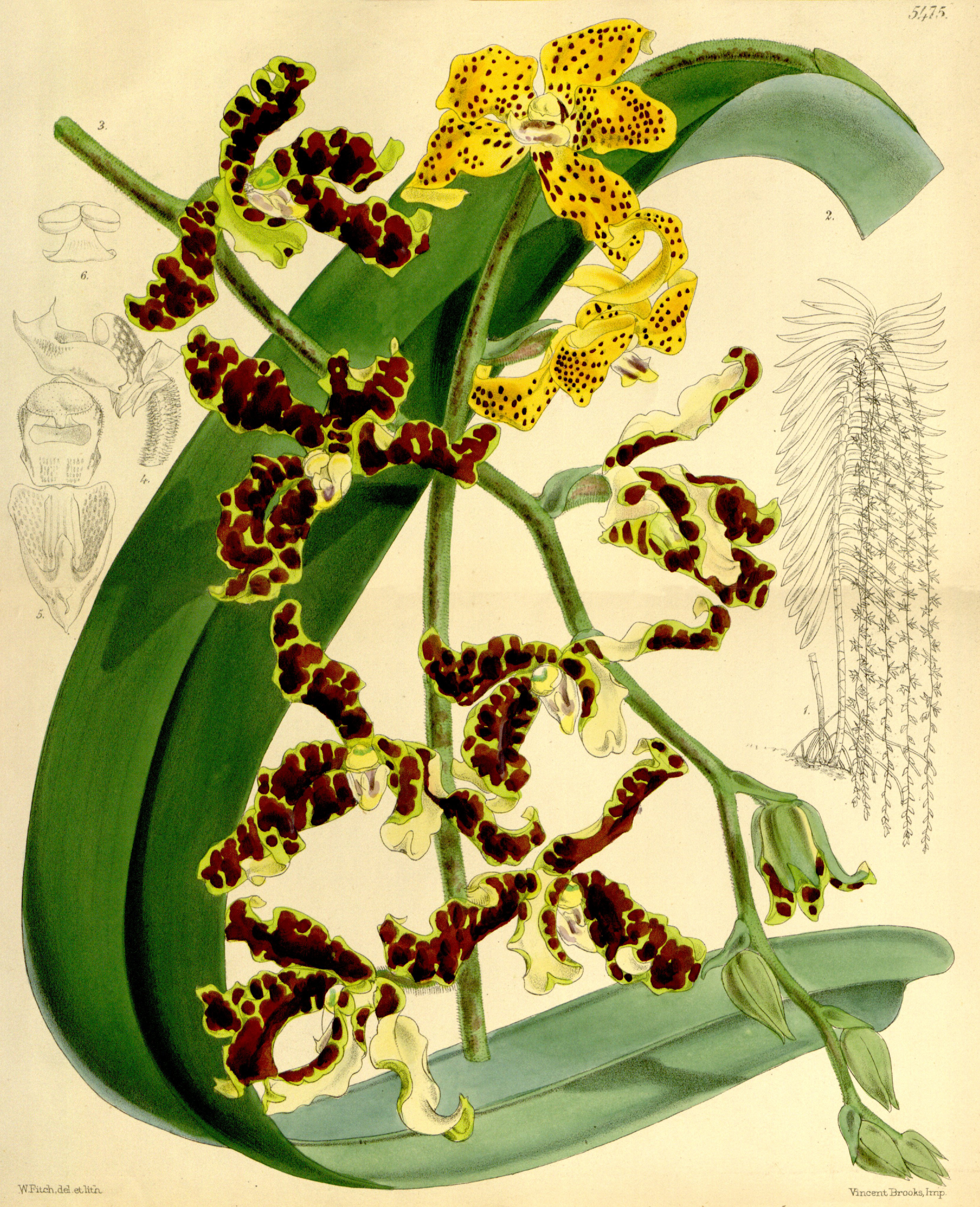
- Botanical illustration of Dimorphorchis lowii

Scientific classification
- Kingdom: Plantae
- Clade: Tracheophytes
- Clade: Angiosperms
- Clade: Monocots
- Order: Asparagales
- Family: Orchidaceae
- Subfamily: Epidendroideae
- Tribe: Vandeae
- Subtribe: Aeridinae
- Genus: Dimorphorchis; Rolfe

Type species
- Dimorphorchis lowii (Benth. & Hook. f.) Rolfe

Synonyms
- Arachnopapua R.Rice; Lowianthus Becc.

= Dimorphorchis =

Genus of plants

Dimorphorchis is a genus of flowering plants from the orchid family, Orchidaceae. It contains 9 species, which are native to Papua New Guinea, the Philippines, Indonesia, Malaysia, Solomon Islands, and Brunei. It is remarkable for its two flower morphs present on the same plant.

== Description ==
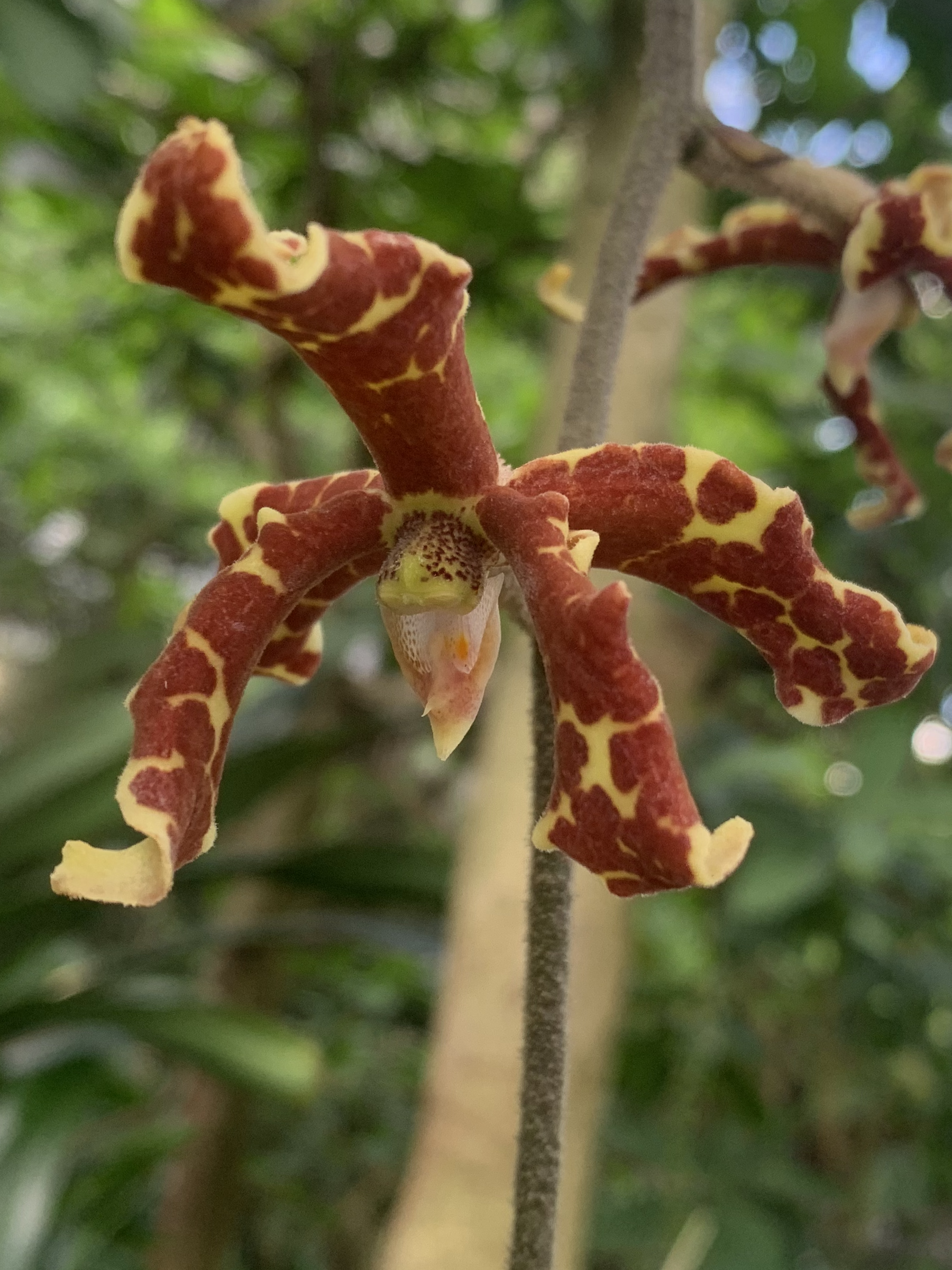
D. rossii distal flower. At Sakuya Konohana Kan.

=== Vegetative characteristics ===
Its species are epiphytic, monopodial herbs with large, pendulous, spreading, or erect up to 200 cm long stems. The basal part of the stem bears roots. The distichously arranged, coriaceous, linear up to 70 cm long leaves have an unequally bilobed to acute apex.

=== Generative characteristics ===
The long, glabrous or pubescent, pendent or erect, racemose or paniculate, up to 3 metres long inflorescences bear dimorphic (heteranthous) or not dimorphic, bisexual flowers. The 2-3 flowers closest to the base of the inflorescence are strongly fragrant, slightly smaller, and of a different colour compared to the rest of the flowers, which are unscented and have wavy petals. The four pollinia with an elliptic viscidium are grouped in two pairs. It is unknown how the genus is pollinated.

== Taxonomy ==
It was published by Robert Allen Rolfe in 1919 with Dimorphorchis lowii (Benth. & Hook. f.) Rolfe as the type species.

=== Species ===
It has nine species:

- Dimorphorchis beccarii (Rchb.f.) Kocyan & Schuit.
- Dimorphorchis breviscapa (J.J.Sm.) Kocyan & Schuit.
- Dimorphorchis celebica (Schltr.) Ormerod
- Dimorphorchis graciliscapa (A.Lamb & Shim) P.J.Cribb
- Dimorphorchis lowii (Lindl.) Rolfe
- Dimorphorchis lyonii (Ames) Ormerod
- Dimorphorchis rohaniana (Rchb.f.) P.J.Cribb
- Dimorphorchis rossii Fowlie
- Dimorphorchis tenomensis (A.Lamb) P.J.Cribb

=== Phylogenetic relationships ===
Within the subtribe Aeridinae, it is the sistergroup to Thrixspermum.

== Etymology ==
The generic name Dimorphorchis references the characteristic two flower morphs preset within the same plant.

== Ecology ==
=== Habitat ===
It can grow as a lithophyte or epiphyte in rainforests.
