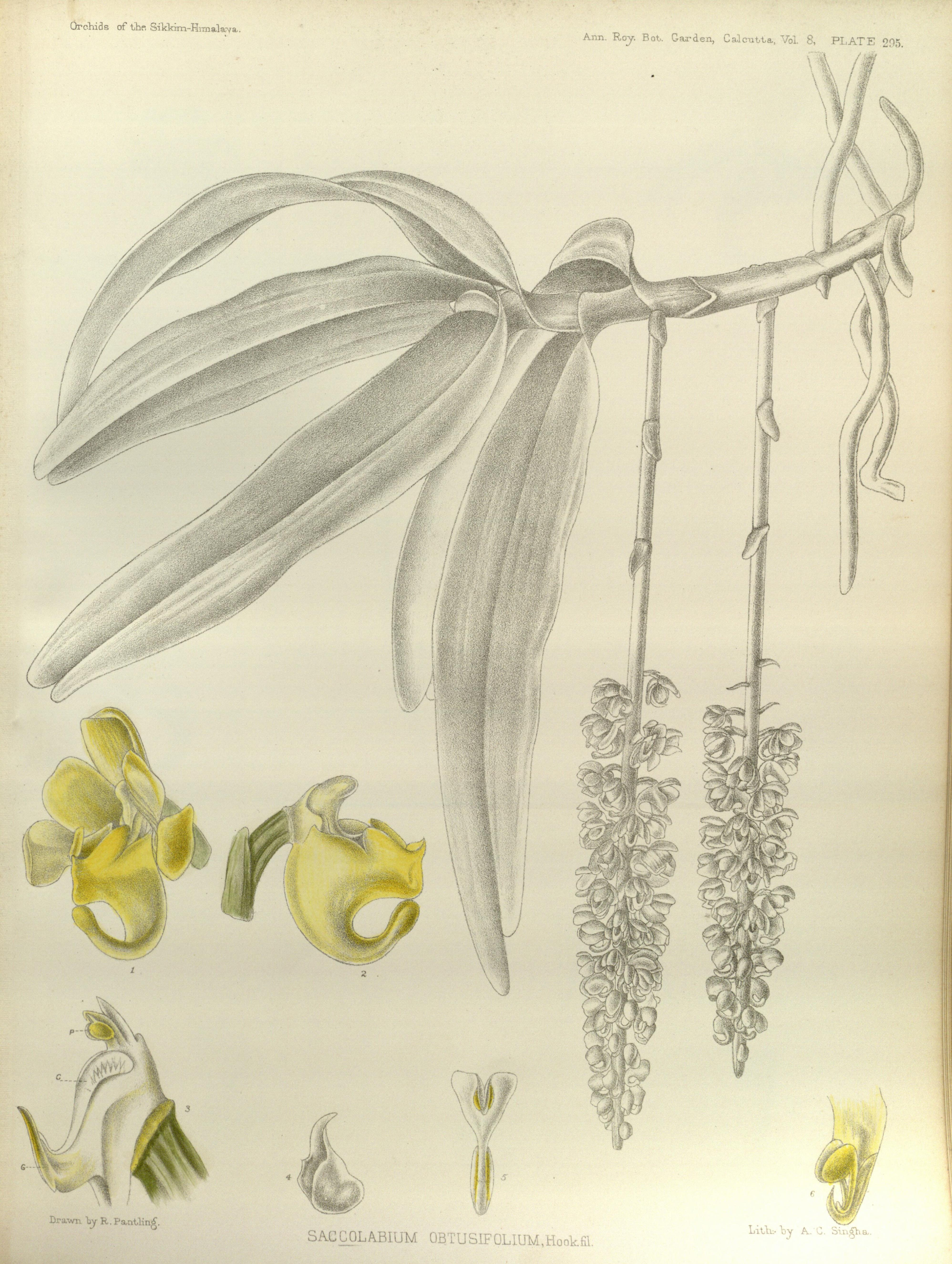
- Botanical drawing of Uncifera obtusifolia, 1889

Scientific classification
- Kingdom: Plantae
- Clade: Tracheophytes
- Clade: Angiosperms
- Clade: Monocots
- Order: Asparagales
- Family: Orchidaceae
- Subfamily: Epidendroideae
- Tribe: Vandeae
- Subtribe: Aeridinae
- Genus: Uncifera; Lindl.

= Uncifera =

Genus of orchids

Uncifera is a genus of epiphytic flowering plants from the orchid family, Orchidaceae. It is native to the Himalayas and to Indochina.

Species accepted as of June 2014:

- Uncifera acuminata Lindl. - Nepal, Sikkim, Bhutan, Assam, Yunnan, Guizhou
- Uncifera dalatensis (Guillaumin) Seidenf. & Smitinand - Thailand
- Uncifera lancifolia (King & Pantl.) Schltr. - Vietnam, Assam, Bhutan, Nepal, Sikkim
- Uncifera obtusifolia Lindl. - Vietnam, Assam, Bhutan, Nepal, Sikkim
- Uncifera thailandica Seidenf. & Smitinand - Yunnan, Thailand
- Uncifera verrucosa Summerh. - Myanmar

== See also ==
- List of Orchidaceae genera
