= Sarcoglyphis =

Scientific classification
- Kingdom: Plantae
- Clade: Tracheophytes
- Clade: Angiosperms
- Clade: Monocots
- Order: Asparagales
- Family: Orchidaceae
- Subfamily: Epidendroideae
- Tribe: Vandeae
- Subtribe: Aeridinae
- Genus: Sarcoglyphis; Garay

Genus of orchids

Sarcoglyphis is a genus of flowering plants from the orchid family, Orchidaceae. It is native to Southeast Asia, the Himalayas and southern China.

Species currently accepted as of June 2014:

- Sarcoglyphis arunachalensis A.N.Rao - Arunachal Pradesh
- Sarcoglyphis brevilabia Aver. - Vietnam
- Sarcoglyphis comberi (J.J.Wood) J.J.Wood - Java
- Sarcoglyphis fimbriata (Ridl.) Garay - Sarawak
- Sarcoglyphis flava (Hook.f.) Garay - Myanmar
- Sarcoglyphis lilacina (J.J.Sm.) Garay - Sumatra
- Sarcoglyphis magnirostris Z.H.Tsi -Yunnan
- Sarcoglyphis masiusii Miadin, A.L.Lamb & Emoi - Sabah
- Sarcoglyphis mirabilis (Rchb.f.) Garay - Indochina
- Sarcoglyphis pensilis (Ridl.) Seidenf. - Malaysia
- Sarcoglyphis potamophila (Schltr.) Garay & W.Kittr. - Borneo
- Sarcoglyphis smithiana (Kerr) Seidenf. - Yunnan, Laos, Thailand, Vietnam
- Sarcoglyphis thailandica Seidenf. - Thailand

== See also ==
- List of Orchidaceae genera
