= Deceptor =

Scientific classification
- Kingdom: Plantae
- Clade: Tracheophytes
- Clade: Angiosperms
- Clade: Monocots
- Order: Asparagales
- Family: Orchidaceae
- Subfamily: Epidendroideae
- Tribe: Vandeae
- Subtribe: Aeridinae
- Genus: Deceptor; Seidenf.
- Species: D. bidoupensis

Binomial name
- Deceptor bidoupensis (Tixier & Guillaumin) Seidenf.

Genus of plants

Deceptor is a genus of flowering plants belonging to the family Orchidaceae. The only species is Deceptor bidoupensis.

Its native range is Indo-China.
