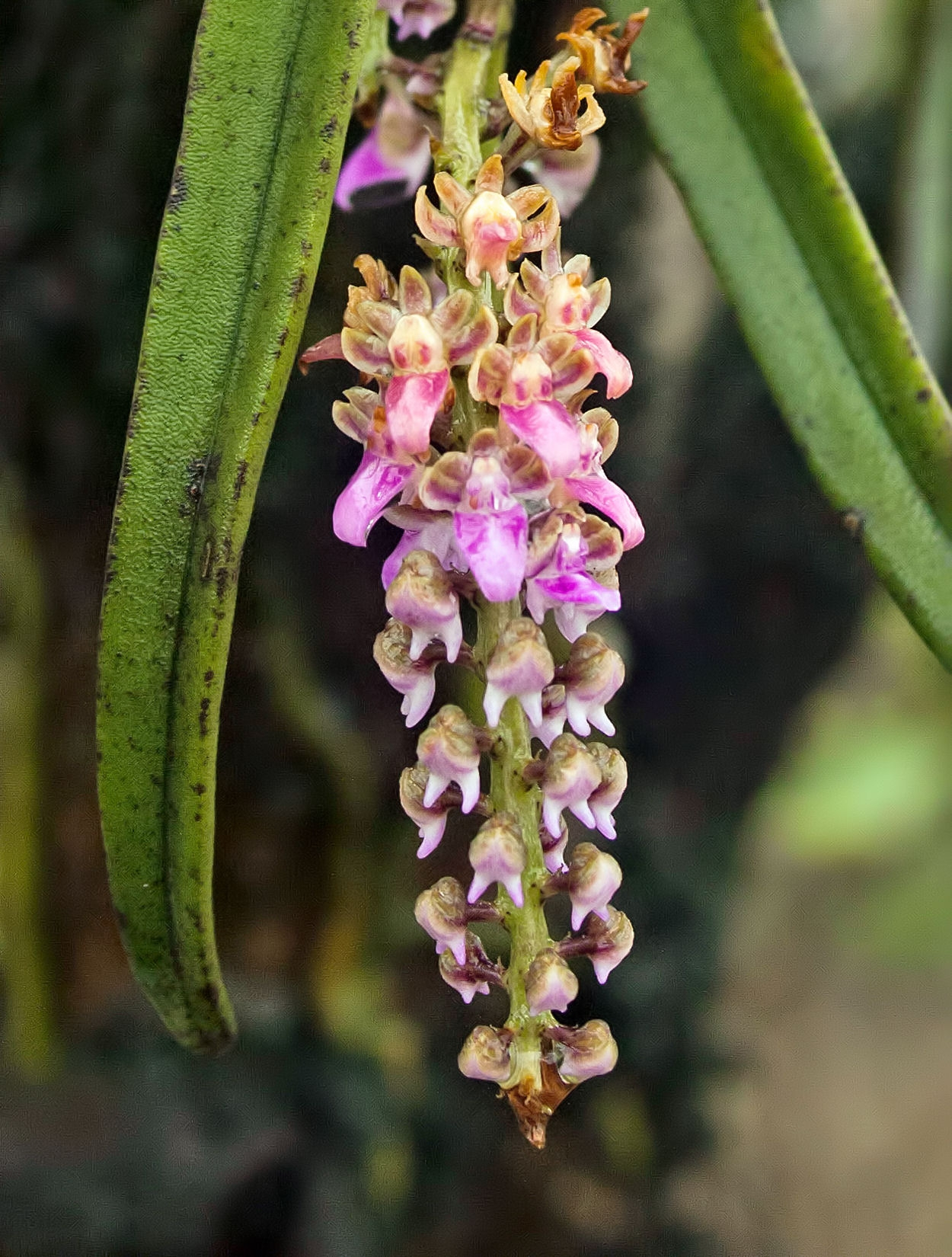
- Diplocentrum recurvum

Scientific classification
- Kingdom: Plantae
- Clade: Tracheophytes
- Clade: Angiosperms
- Clade: Monocots
- Order: Asparagales
- Family: Orchidaceae
- Subfamily: Epidendroideae
- Tribe: Vandeae
- Subtribe: Aeridinae
- Genus: Diplocentrum; Lindl.

= Diplocentrum =

Genus of orchids

Diplocentrum is a genus of flowering plants from the orchid family, Orchidaceae. It has two known species:

- Diplocentrum congestum Wight - southern India
- Diplocentrum recurvum Lindl. - southern India, Sri Lanka

== See also ==
- List of Orchidaceae genera
