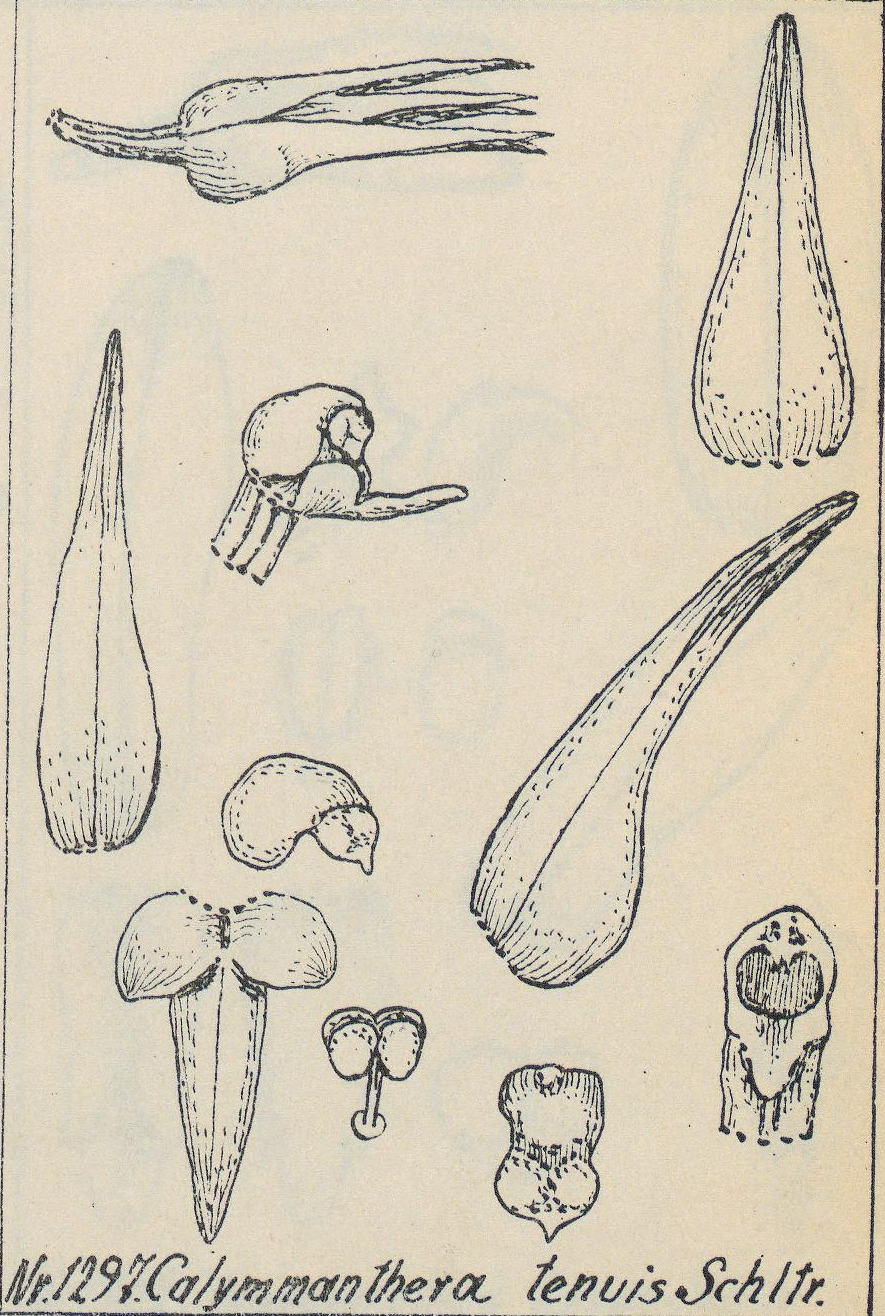
- Botanical illustration of Calymmanthera tenuis

Scientific classification
- Kingdom: Plantae
- Clade: Tracheophytes
- Clade: Angiosperms
- Clade: Monocots
- Order: Asparagales
- Family: Orchidaceae
- Subfamily: Epidendroideae
- Tribe: Vandeae
- Subtribe: Aeridinae
- Genus: Calymmanthera; Schltr.

= Calymmanthera =

Genus of orchids

Calymmanthera is a genus of flowering plants from the orchid family, Orchidaceae. It contains 5 species, native to Maluku, New Guinea, Fiji and the Solomon Islands.

- Calymmanthera filiformis (J.J.Sm.) Schltr. - New Guinea
- Calymmanthera major Schltr. - New Guinea, Fiji and the Solomon Islands
- Calymmanthera montana Schltr. - - New Guinea
- Calymmanthera paniculata (J.J.Sm.) Schltr. - New Guinea, Morotai
- Calymmanthera tenuis Schltr. - New Guinea

== See also ==
- List of Orchidaceae genera
