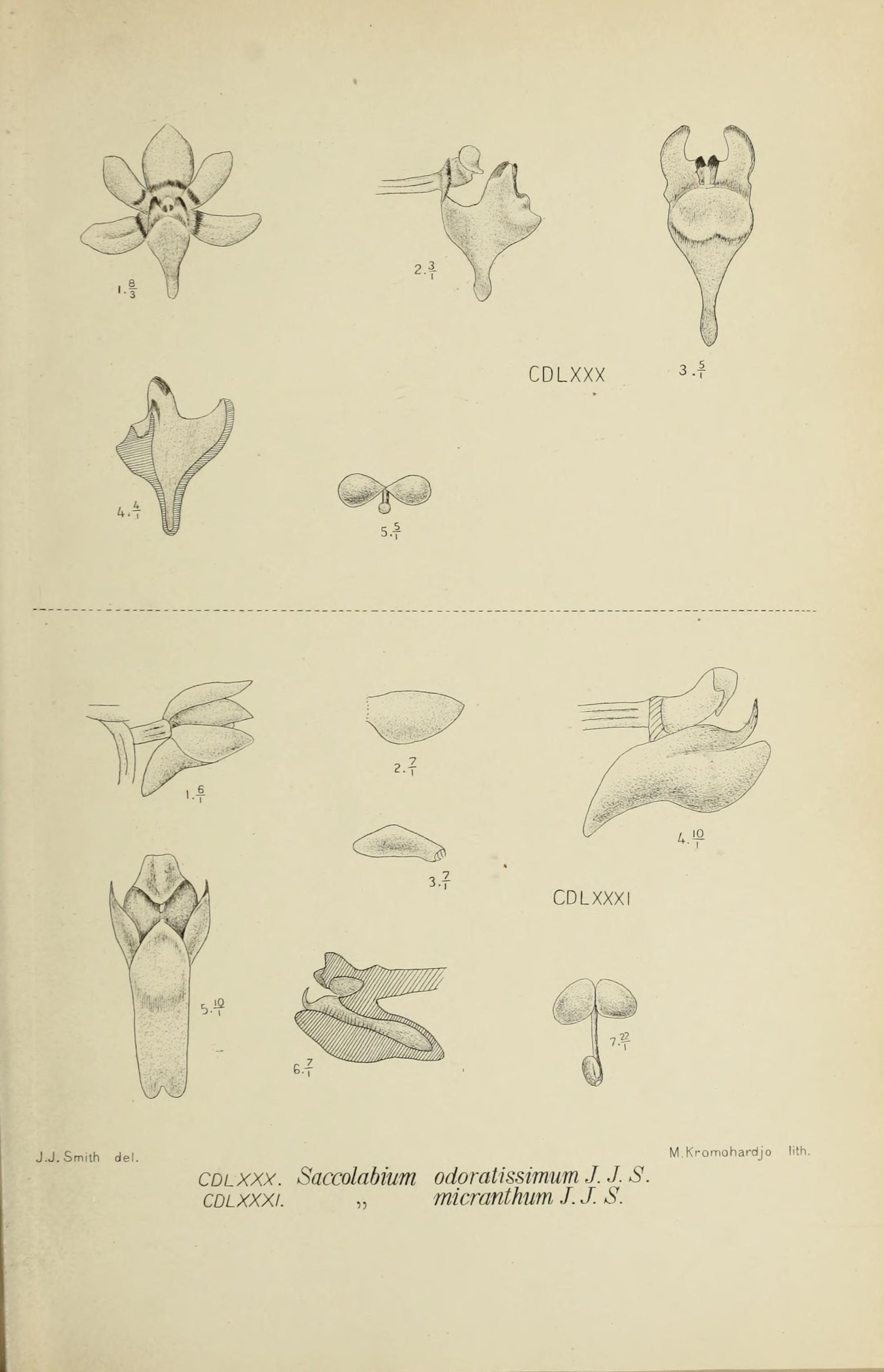
- Omoea micrantha below (as Saccolabium micranthum)

Scientific classification
- Kingdom: Plantae
- Clade: Tracheophytes
- Clade: Angiosperms
- Clade: Monocots
- Order: Asparagales
- Family: Orchidaceae
- Subfamily: Epidendroideae
- Tribe: Vandeae
- Subtribe: Aeridinae
- Genus: Omoea; Blume

= Omoea =

Genus of orchids

Omoea is a genus of flowering plants from the orchid family, Orchidaceae. It includes two known species, both native to Southeast Asia.

- Omoea micrantha Blume - Java, Sumatra
- Omoea philippinensis Ames - Luzon

== See also ==
- List of Orchidaceae genera
