= Adenoncos =

- Illustration of Adenoncos virens

Scientific classification
- Kingdom: Plantae
- Clade: Tracheophytes
- Clade: Angiosperms
- Clade: Monocots
- Order: Asparagales
- Family: Orchidaceae
- Subfamily: Epidendroideae
- Tribe: Vandeae
- Subtribe: Aeridinae
- Genus: Adenoncos; Blume

Type species
- Adenoncos virens Blume

Species
- Adenoncos adenoncoides; Adenoncos borneensis; Adenoncos buruensis; Adenoncos celebica; Adenoncos elongata; Adenoncos macranthus; Adenoncos major; Adenoncos nasonioides; Adenoncos papuana; Adenoncos parviflora; Adenoncos quadrangularis; Adenoncos saccata; Adenoncos suborbicularis; Adenoncos sumatrana; Adenoncos triangularis; Adenoncos triloba; Adenoncos uniflora; Adenoncos vesiculosa; Adenoncos virens

Synonyms
- Podochilopsis Guillaumin

Genus of orchids

Adenoncos is a genus of the orchid family (Orchidaceae), consisting of 20 species native to Thailand, Vietnam, Malaysia, Indonesia and New Guinea.
