= Santotomasia =

Scientific classification
- Kingdom: Plantae
- Clade: Tracheophytes
- Clade: Angiosperms
- Clade: Monocots
- Order: Asparagales
- Family: Orchidaceae
- Subfamily: Epidendroideae
- Tribe: Vandeae
- Subtribe: Aeridinae
- Genus: Santotomasia; Ormerod
- Species: S. wardiana

Binomial name
- Santotomasia wardiana Ormerod

Genus of plants

Santotomasia is a monotypic genus of flowering plants belonging to the family Orchidaceae. The only species is Santotomasia wardiana.

Its native range is Philippines.
