= Mobilabium =

Hook-leaf

Scientific classification
- Kingdom: Plantae
- Clade: Embryophytes
- Clade: Tracheophytes
- Clade: Spermatophytes
- Clade: Angiosperms
- Clade: Monocots
- Order: Asparagales
- Family: Orchidaceae
- Subfamily: Epidendroideae
- Tribe: Vandeae
- Subtribe: Aeridinae
- Genus: Mobilabium; Rupp
- Species: M. hamatum

Binomial name
- Mobilabium hamatum Rupp

Genus of orchids

Mobilabium hamatum, commonly known as hook-leaf, is the only species in the genus Mobilabium from the orchid family, Orchidaceae. It is an epiphytic orchid with between three and twelve stiff, oblong leaves with a hooked tip. There are up to fifteen star-shaped, cream-coloured, pale green or brownish flowers with red or purple markings. The labellum has three lobes with the middle lobe hollow and containing sticky nectar. It mainly grows on rainforest trees at higher altitudes and is found in tropical North Queensland.

== Description ==
Mobilabium hamatum is an epiphytic herb with many stiff roots and upright or hanging stems 100–600 millimetres (3.9–24 in) long. Each stem has between three and fifteen stiff, oblong, yellowish green leaves 30–70 millimetres (1.2–2.8 in) long and 4–6 millimetres (0.16–0.24 in) wide with a hooked tip. Between five and fifteen cream-coloured, pale green or brownish flowers with brownish or purplish markings, 6–7 millimetres (0.24–0.28 in) long and wide are borne on flowering stems 30–60 millimetres (1.2–2.4 in) long. The sepals and petals spread widely apart from each other, the sepals about 3.5 millimetres (0.14 in) long and 1.5 millimetres (0.059 in) wide, the petals slightly shorter and narrower. There is a hinge between the column and the labellum, the latter with three lobes. The middle lobe is rounded and hollow, containing sticky nectar. Flowering occurs from July to August.

== Taxonomy and naming ==
Mobilabium hamatum was first formally described in 1946 by Herman Rupp and the description was published in The North Queensland Naturalist. The type specimen was sent to Rupp by Thomas Edgar Hunt who called it "hookey leaf" and whose brother "R.Hunt" had collected it. The name Mobilabium is derived from the Latin words mobilis meaning "mobile" and labium meaning "lip". The specific epithet (hamatum) is a Latin word meaning "with hooks" or "hooked".

== Distribution and habitat ==
Hook-leaf mostly grows on rainforest trees, sometimes on isolated trees in paddocks and on other plants near streams, at altitudes between 600 and 1,300 metres (2,000 and 4,300 ft). It is found in north Queensland between the Cedar Bay National Park and Townsville.

== See also ==
- List of Orchidaceae genera
