= Porrorhachis =

Scientific classification
- Kingdom: Plantae
- Clade: Tracheophytes
- Clade: Angiosperms
- Clade: Monocots
- Order: Asparagales
- Family: Orchidaceae
- Subfamily: Epidendroideae
- Tribe: Vandeae
- Subtribe: Aeridinae
- Genus: Porrorhachis; Garay

Genus of orchids

Porrorhachis is a genus of flowering plants from the orchid family, Orchidaceae. It contains two known species, both native to Southeast Asia.

- Porrorhachis galbina (J.J.Sm.) Garay - Sabah, Sulawesi, Java
- Porrorhachis macrosepala (Schltr.) Garay - Sulawesi

== See also ==
- List of Orchidaceae genera
