= Rhynchogyna =

Scientific classification
- Kingdom: Plantae
- Clade: Tracheophytes
- Clade: Angiosperms
- Clade: Monocots
- Order: Asparagales
- Family: Orchidaceae
- Subfamily: Epidendroideae
- Tribe: Vandeae
- Subtribe: Aeridinae
- Genus: Rhynchogyna; Seidenf. & Garay

Genus of orchids

Rhynchogyna is a genus of flowering plants from the orchid family, Orchidaceae. It has three known species, all native to Indochina.

- Rhynchogyna fallax (Guillaumin) Seidenf. - Vietnam
- Rhynchogyna luisifolia (Ridl.) Seidenf. & Garay - Thailand, Peninsular Malaysia
- Rhynchogyna saccata Seidenf. & Garay - Thailand

== See also ==
- List of Orchidaceae genera
