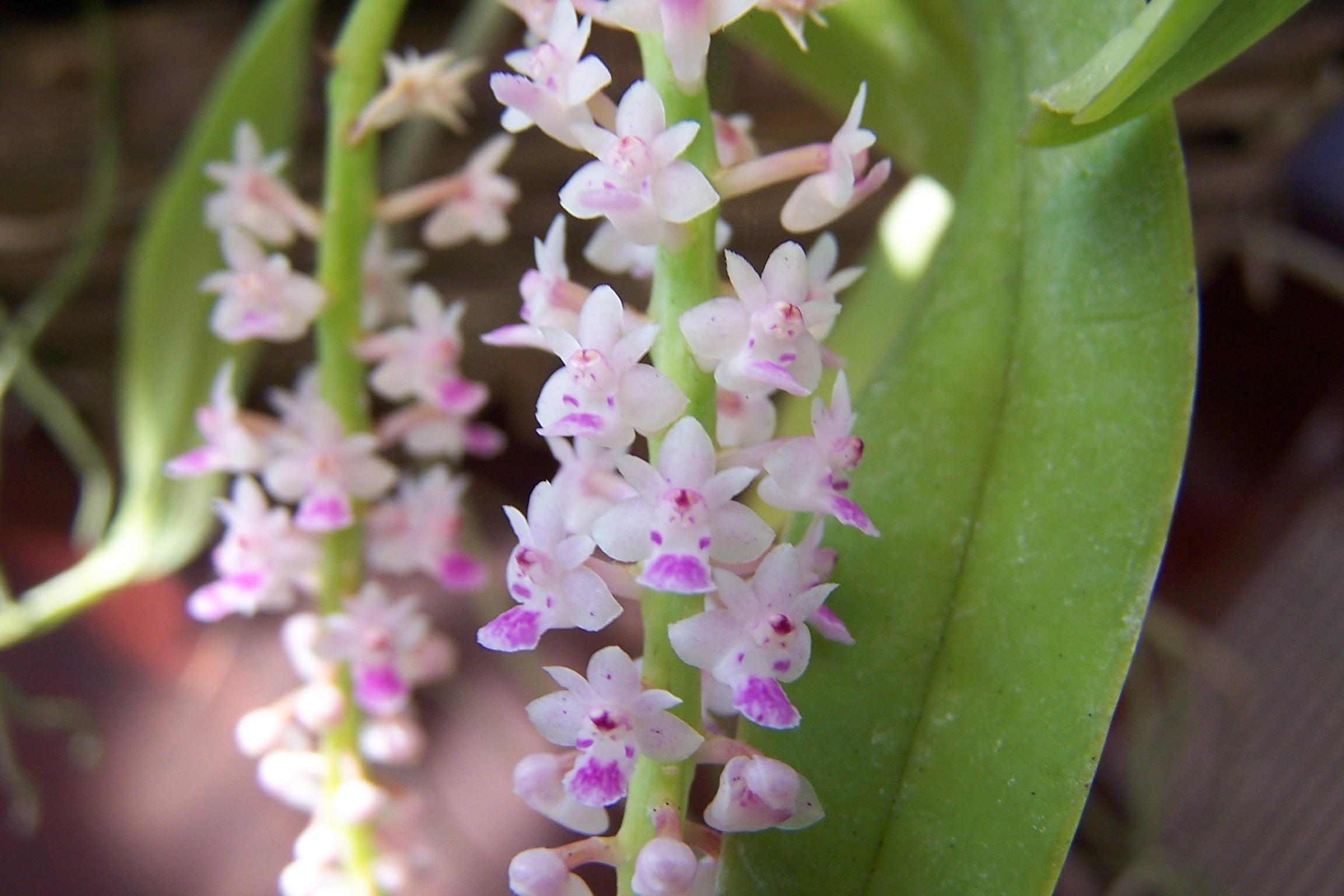
- Smitinandia micrantha

Scientific classification
- Kingdom: Plantae
- Clade: Tracheophytes
- Clade: Angiosperms
- Clade: Monocots
- Order: Asparagales
- Family: Orchidaceae
- Subfamily: Epidendroideae
- Tribe: Vandeae
- Subtribe: Aeridinae
- Genus: Smitinandia; Holttum

= Smitinandia =

Genus of orchids

Smitinandia is a genus of flowering plants from the orchid family, Orchidaceae. It contains three known species, native to Southeast Asia and the Himalayas.

- Smitinandia helferi (Hook.f.) Garay - Indochina, Andaman Islands
- Smitinandia micrantha (Lindl.) Holttum - Yunnan, Assam, Bhutan, Nepal, India, Bangladesh, Indochina, Borneo, Peninsular Malaysia
- Smitinandia selebensis (J.J.Sm.) Garay - Sulawesi

== See also ==
- List of Orchidaceae genera
