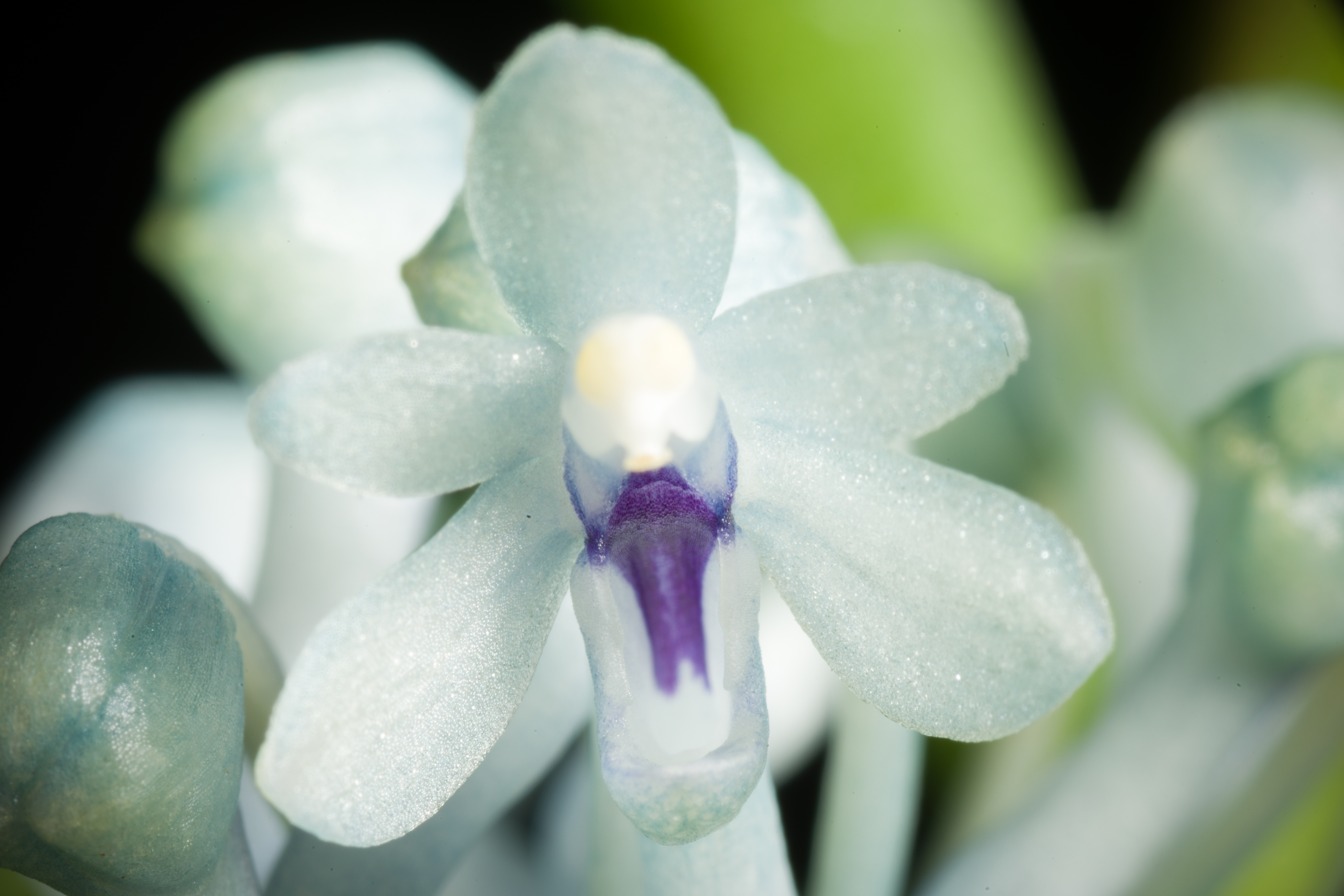
- Cleisocentron merrillianum

Scientific classification
- Kingdom: Plantae
- Clade: Tracheophytes
- Clade: Angiosperms
- Clade: Monocots
- Order: Asparagales
- Family: Orchidaceae
- Subfamily: Epidendroideae
- Tribe: Vandeae
- Subtribe: Aeridinae
- Genus: Cleisocentron; Brühl

Type species
- Cleisocentron trichromum (Rchb. f.) Brühl

Synonyms
- Singchia Z.J.Liu & L.J.Chen

= Cleisocentron =

Genus of orchids

Cleisocentron is a genus of flowering plants from the orchid family, Orchidaceae. It has a disjunct distribution, known from the Himalayas, Vietnam, China and Borneo.

== Description ==
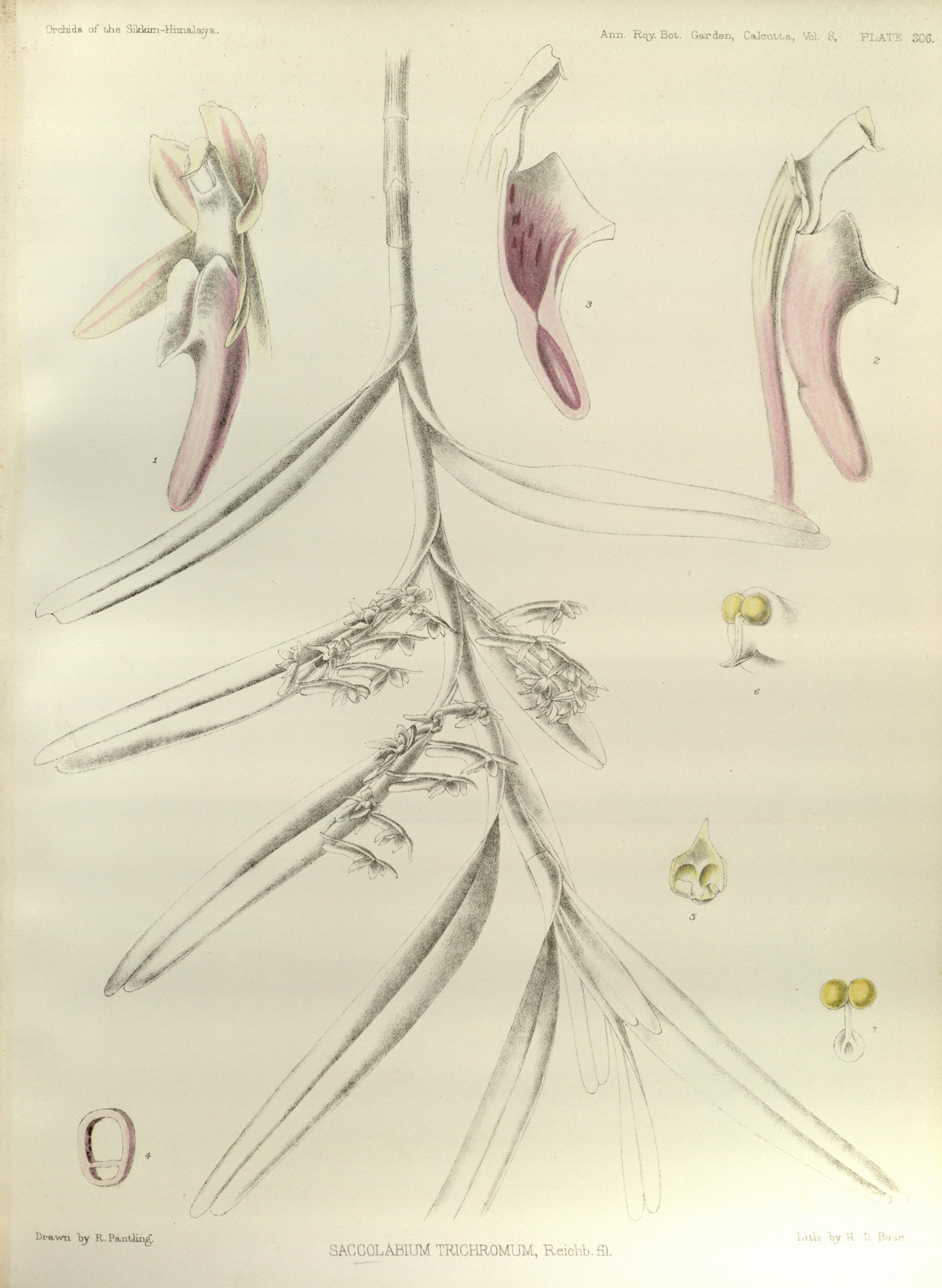
Illustration of Cleisocentron pallens

The species of this genus are tropical epiphytes with a pendent or erect habit. The leaves may be terete or broad. Both types of leaves may occur on the same specimen, as some species exhibit leaf polymorphy. Three species have blue flowers, but other colours, such as pink and white also occur.

== Cytology ==
The diploid chromosome count is 2n = 38.

== Etymology ==
The generic name is derived from the Greek kleistos meaning closed, as well as kentron meaning spur. The name relates to the morphology of the spurred labellum.

== Ecology ==
=== Pollination ===
There have been reports of pollination or visitation by ants, which was observed during field expeditions in Borneo. Alternatively, there have been speculations, that the nectariferous flowers are pollinated by butterflies.

== Taxonomy ==
It was published by Paul Johannes Brühl in 1926 with Cleisocentron trichromum (Rchb. f.) Brühl as the type species.

=== Species ===
Eight species are currently recognized:

- Cleisocentron abasii Cavestro - Sabah
- Cleisocentron gokusingii J.J.Wood & A.L.Lamb - Sabah
- Cleisocentron kinabaluense Metusala & J.J.Wood - Sabah
- Cleisocentron klossii (Ridl.) Garay - Vietnam
- Cleisocentron malipoense (Z.J.Liu & L.J.Chen) R.Rice - Malipo, Yunnan, China
- Cleisocentron merrillianum (Ames) Christenson - Sabah
- Cleisocentron neglectum M.J.Mathew & J.Mathew - India (Karnataka)
- Cleisocentron pallens (Cathcart ex Lindl.) N.Pearce & P.J.Cribb - eastern Himalayas (Sikkim, Bhutan, Assam, India)

=== Formerly included species ===
- Cleisocentron collettianum (King & Pantl.) Garay is now considered a synonym of Robiquetia pachyphylla (Rchb.f.) Garay.

== Horticulture ==
Cleisocentron is rarely found in cultivation. However, they are easy to cultivate. Numerous intergeneric hybrids with Cleisocentron have been described.

== See also ==
- List of Orchidaceae genera
