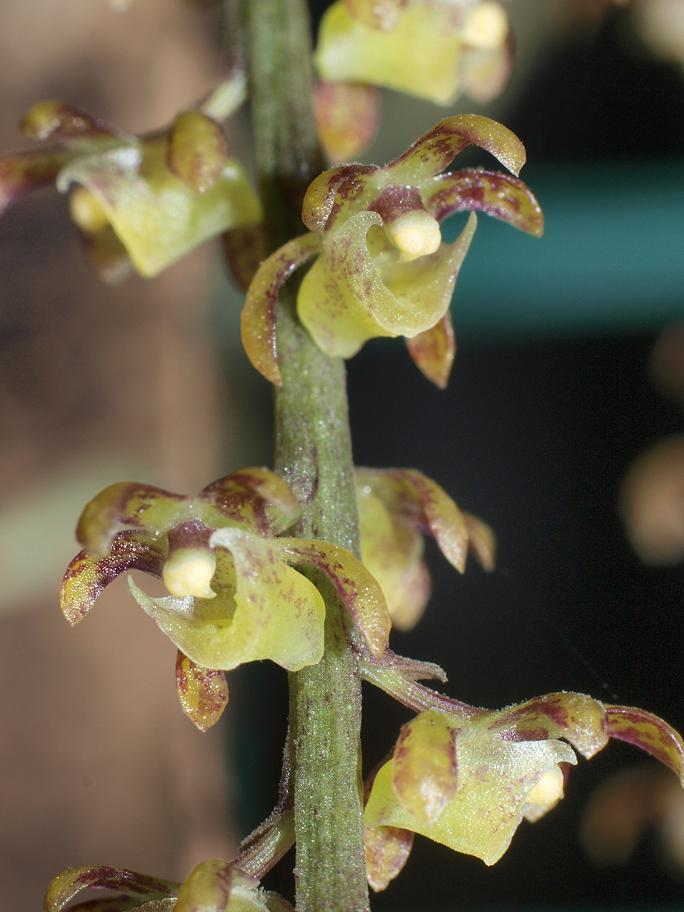

Scientific classification
- Kingdom: Plantae
- Clade: Tracheophytes
- Clade: Angiosperms
- Clade: Monocots
- Order: Asparagales
- Family: Orchidaceae
- Subfamily: Epidendroideae
- Tribe: Vandeae
- Subtribe: Aeridinae
- Genus: Peristeranthus; T.E.Hunt
- Species: P. hillii

Binomial name
- Peristeranthus hillii (F.Muell.) T.E.Hunt

Synonyms
- Saccolabium hillii F.Muell.; Ornithochilus hillii (F.Muell.) Benth.

= Peristeranthus =

Beetle orchid

Genus of orchids

Peristeranthus hillii, commonly known as the beetle orchid or brown fairy-chain orchid is the only species in the genus Peristeranthus from the orchid family, Orchidaceae. It is an epiphytic or lithophytic orchid with more or less pendulous stems, between three and ten widely spaced, leathery leaves and a large number of pale green, often spotted flowers. It mainly grows on tree trunks and thick vines in rainforest and is found between the Bloomfield River in Queensland and Port Macquarie in New South Wales.

== Description ==
Peristeranthus hillii is an epiphytic or lithophytic herb with one or two shoots and more or less pendulous stems 30–250 millimetres (1.2–9.8 in) long. Each stem has between three and ten narrow oblong leaves 150–250 millimetres (5.9–9.8 in) long and 15–40 millimetres (0.59–1.6 in) wide. The leaves have many parallel veins, a drooping tip and are often twisted. Between twenty five and seventy five pale green flowers often with crimson markings, 6–8 millimetres (0.24–0.31 in) long and 5–7 millimetres (0.20–0.28 in) wide are borne on pendulous flowering stems 150–250 millimetres (5.9–9.8 in) long. The sepals and petals spread widely apart from each other and are about 3 millimetres (0.12 in) long and 1 millimetre (0.039 in) wide. The labellum is yellow with red spots, about 2.5 millimetres (0.098 in) long, 3 millimetres (0.12 in) wide with three lobes. The side lobes are triangular and the middle lobe has a hollow, tapered spur. Flowering occurs from September to October.

== Taxonomy and naming ==
The beetle orchid was first formally described in 1859 by Ferdinand von Mueller who gave it the name Saccolabium hillii and published the description in Fragmenta phytographiae Australiae from a specimen collected by Walter Hill near Moreton Bay. In 1954, Trevor Edgar Hunt changed the name to Peristeranthus hillii. According to Hunt, the genus name Peristeranthus is derived from the Greek words peristera meaning "dove" and anthus meaning "flower", as "the flower" is "bearing a fanciful resemblance to a dove". In ancient Greek, "flower" is however anthos (ἄνθος). The specific epithet honours the collector of the type specimen.

== Distribution and habitat ==
Peristeranthus hillii mainly grows on three trunks and vines in highland rainforest in the tropics and in coastal and near-coastal areas in subtropical regions. It is found between the Bloomfield River in Queensland and Port Macquarie in New South Wales.

== Conservation ==
This orchid is listed as vulnerable under the New South Wales Threatened Species Conservation Act 1995. The main threats to the species are habitat loss, storm damage, inappropriate fire regimes and illegal collecting.

== See also ==
- List of Orchidaceae genera
