= Schistotylus =

Purple sprites

Scientific classification
- Kingdom: Plantae
- Clade: Tracheophytes
- Clade: Angiosperms
- Clade: Monocots
- Order: Asparagales
- Family: Orchidaceae
- Subfamily: Epidendroideae
- Tribe: Vandeae
- Subtribe: Aeridinae
- Genus: Schistotylus; Dockrill
- Species: S. purpuratus

Binomial name
- Schistotylus purpuratus (Rupp) Dockrill

Synonyms
- Cleisostoma gemmatum Rupp nom. illeg.; Cleisostoma purpuratum Rupp; Sarcanthus gemmatus Rupp nom. illeg., nom. superfl.; Sarcanthus gemmatus Rupp

Genus of orchids

Schistotylus purpuratus, commonly known as purple sprites, is the only species in the genus Schistotylus from the orchid family, Orchidaceae. It is a small epiphytic orchid with up to six crowded, linear leaves and up to ten cup-shaped, pale green flowers with purple marking and a mostly white labellum. It grows in rainforest and swampy heath in eastern Australia.

== Description ==
Schistotylus purpuratus is a small epiphytic herb, usually with only a single growth. The stems are 20–30 millimetres (0.79–1.2 in) long with between two and six crowded, linear to narrow elliptic leaves 20–40 millimetres (0.79–1.6 in) long and 2–3 millimetres (0.079–0.12 in) wide. Between four and ten fragrant, cup-shaped, pale green flowers with purple blotches, 5–6 millimetres (0.20–0.24 in) long and 4–5 millimetres (0.16–0.20 in) wide are borne on a thin, arching flowering stem 25–40 millimetres (0.98–1.6 in) long. The sepals are about 3 millimetres (0.12 in) long and 1.5 millimetres (0.059 in) wide, the petals are slightly shorter and narrower. The labellum is white with yellow markings, about 5 millimetres (0.20 in) long and 2 millimetres (0.079 in) wide with three lobes. The side lobes have a beak-like front and the middle lobe is short and thickened with a spur 3 millimetres (0.12 in) long. Flowering occurs from August to October.

== Taxonomy and naming ==
Purple sprites was first formally described in 1938 by Herman Rupp who originally gave it the name Cleisostoma gemmatum and published the description in The Victorian Naturalist. That name was, however a nomen illegitimum because it had been used for a different species, and Rupp changed in the name to Cleisostoma purpuratum in a later edition of the same journal. In 1941, Rupp changed the name again to Schistotylus purpuratus. The specific epithet (purpuratus) is derived from the Latin word purpura meaning "a purple dye", referring to "the striking reddish purple suffusion of the column.

== Distribution and habitat ==
Schistotylus purpuratus grows on shrubs and the twigs of trees in forest, heath and scrub. It is found between Nerang in Queensland and the Carrai National Park in New South Wales.

== See also ==
- List of Orchidaceae genera
