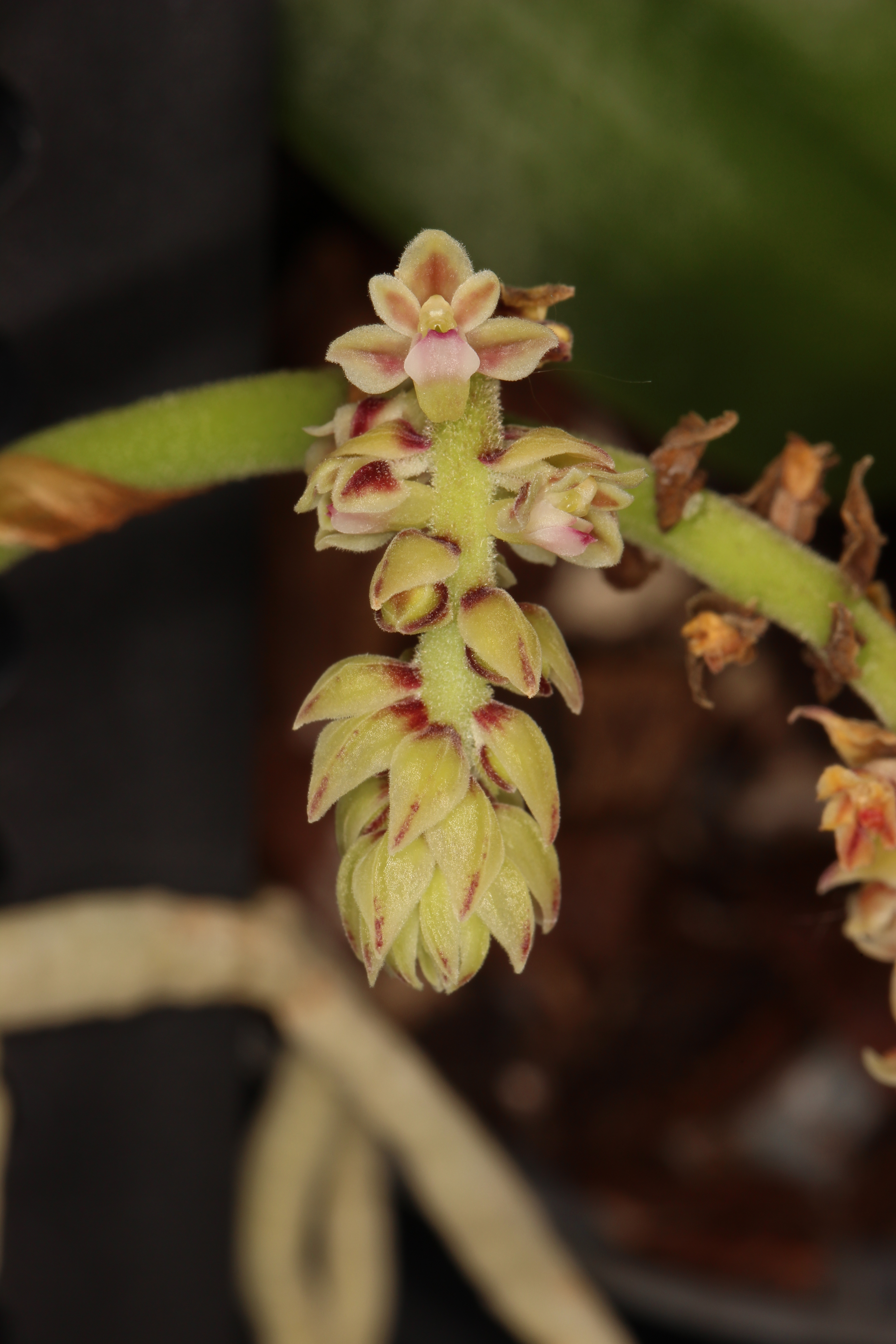
- Detail of Cleisomeria pilosula inflorescence
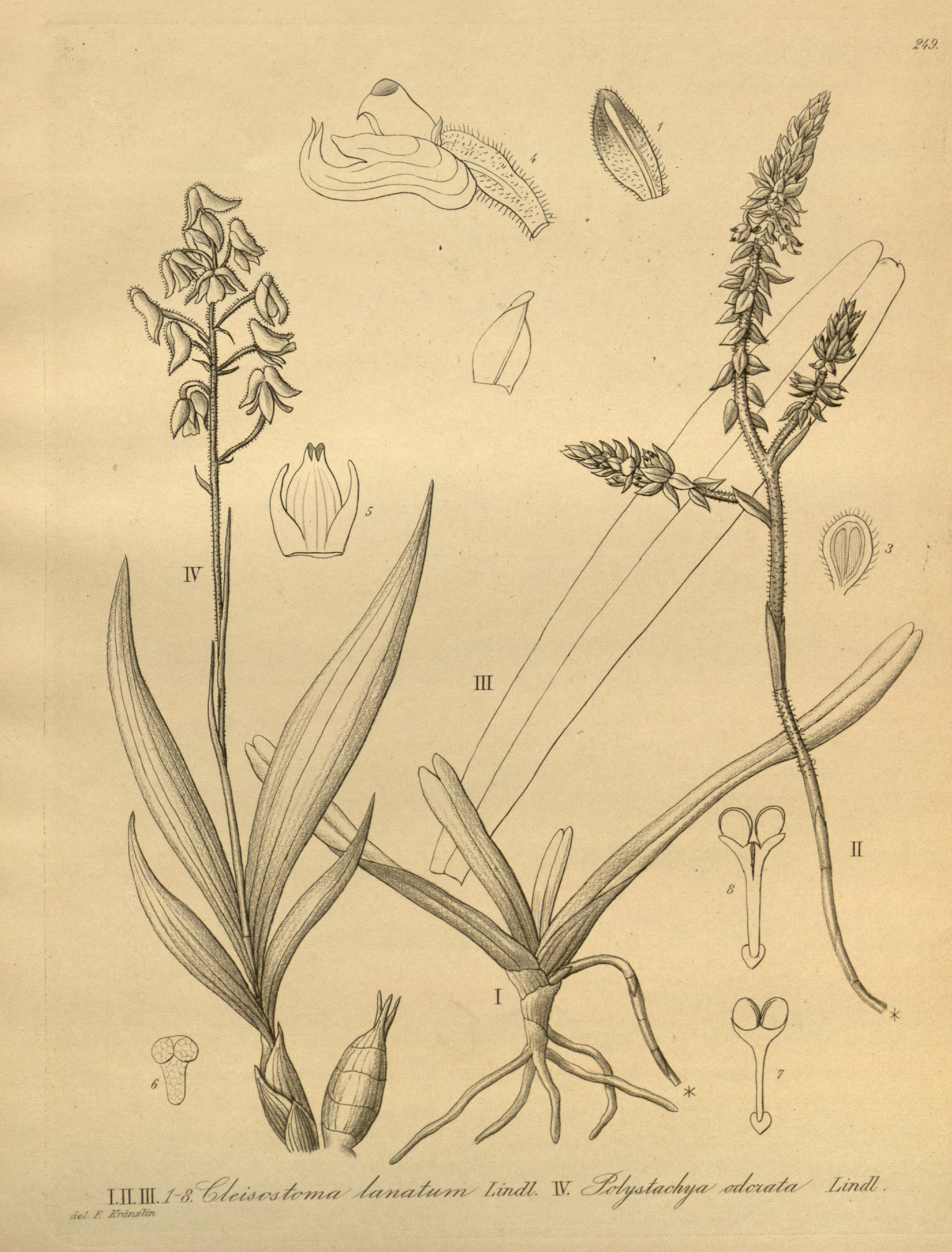
- Botanical illustration of Cleisomeria lanatum (right) and Polystachya odorata (left)

Scientific classification
- Kingdom: Plantae
- Clade: Tracheophytes
- Clade: Angiosperms
- Clade: Monocots
- Order: Asparagales
- Family: Orchidaceae
- Subfamily: Epidendroideae
- Tribe: Vandeae
- Subtribe: Aeridinae
- Genus: Cleisomeria; Lindl. ex G.Don in J.C.Loudon

Type species
- Cleisomeria lanatum Lindl. ex G.Don in J.C.Loudon

= Cleisomeria =

Genus of orchids

Cleisomeria is a genus of flowering plants in the orchid family Orchidaceae native to southeast Asia from Bangladesh to Borneo.

== Taxonomy ==
=== Species ===
The genus contains two accepted species:

- Cleisomeria lanatum (Lindl.) Lindl. ex G.Don in J.C.Loudon - Bangladesh, Myanmar, Thailand, Laos, Vietnam, Cambodia, Malaysia, Borneo
- Cleisomeria pilosulum (Gagnep.) Seidenf. & Garay - Myanmar, Thailand, Laos, Vietnam, Cambodia

== Physiology ==
Various alkaloids, flavonoids, saponins, tannins, phenolic compounds, terpenoids, steroids, glycosides, quinines, coumarins, proteins, and resins have been isolated from Cleisomeria lanatum. The isolated compounds have been shown to exhibit some potential as anti-inflammatory, antioxidant, and thrombolytic agents.
