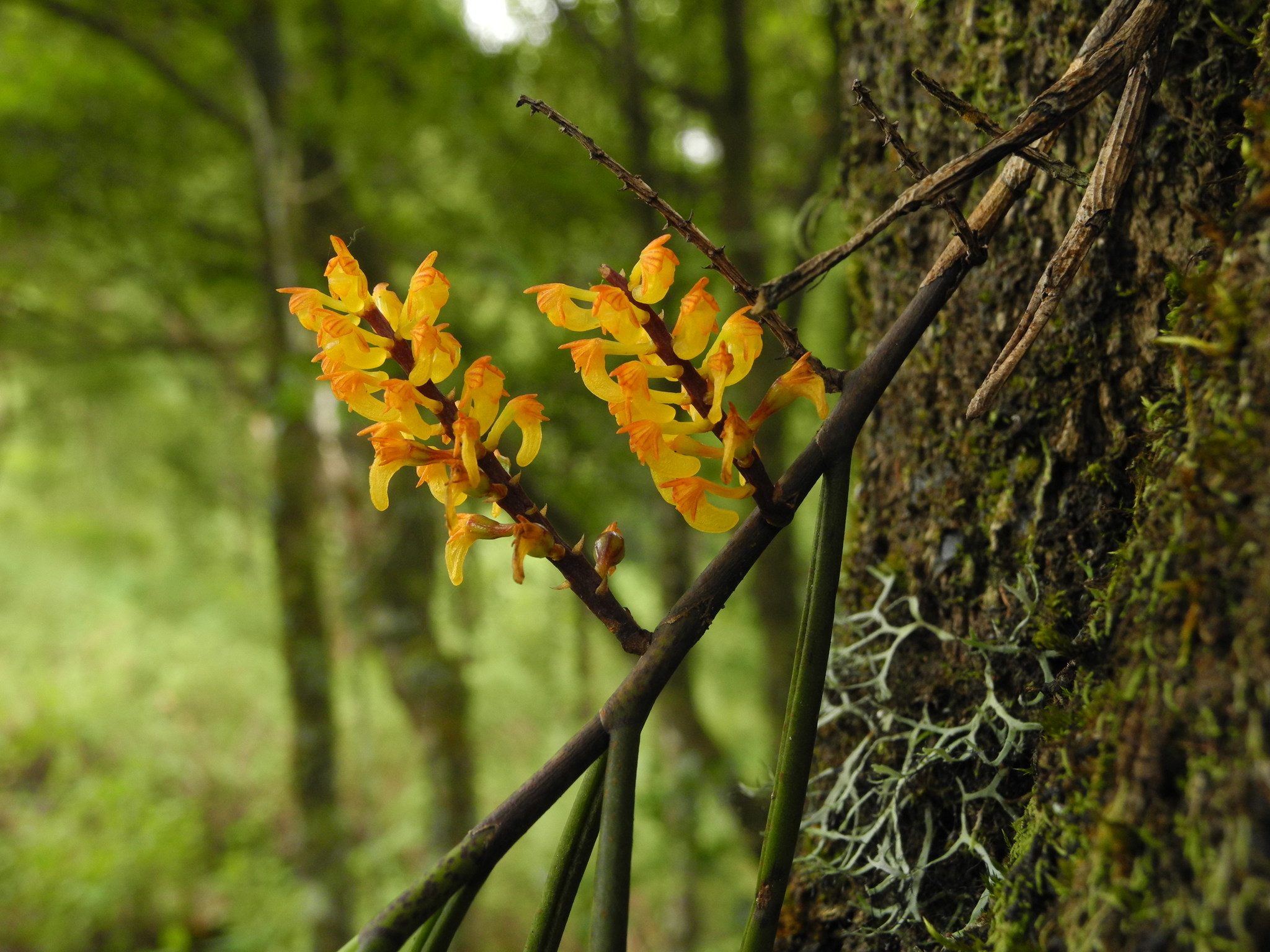
- Cleisostomopsis filiformis

Scientific classification
- Kingdom: Plantae
- Clade: Tracheophytes
- Clade: Angiosperms
- Clade: Monocots
- Order: Asparagales
- Family: Orchidaceae
- Subfamily: Epidendroideae
- Subtribe: Aeridinae
- Genus: Cleisostomopsis; Seidenf.

= Cleisostomopsis =

Genus of flowering plants

Cleisostomopsis is a genus of flowering plants belonging to the family Orchidaceae.

Its native range is Indian Subcontinent to Southeastern China and Indo-China.

== Species ==
The following species are recognized:

- Cleisostomopsis eberhardtii (Finet) Seidenf.
- Cleisostomopsis elytrigera (Seidenf.) Szlach.
- Cleisostomopsis filiformis (Rchb.f.) R.Rice
- Cleisostomopsis roseus (Wight) R.Rice
