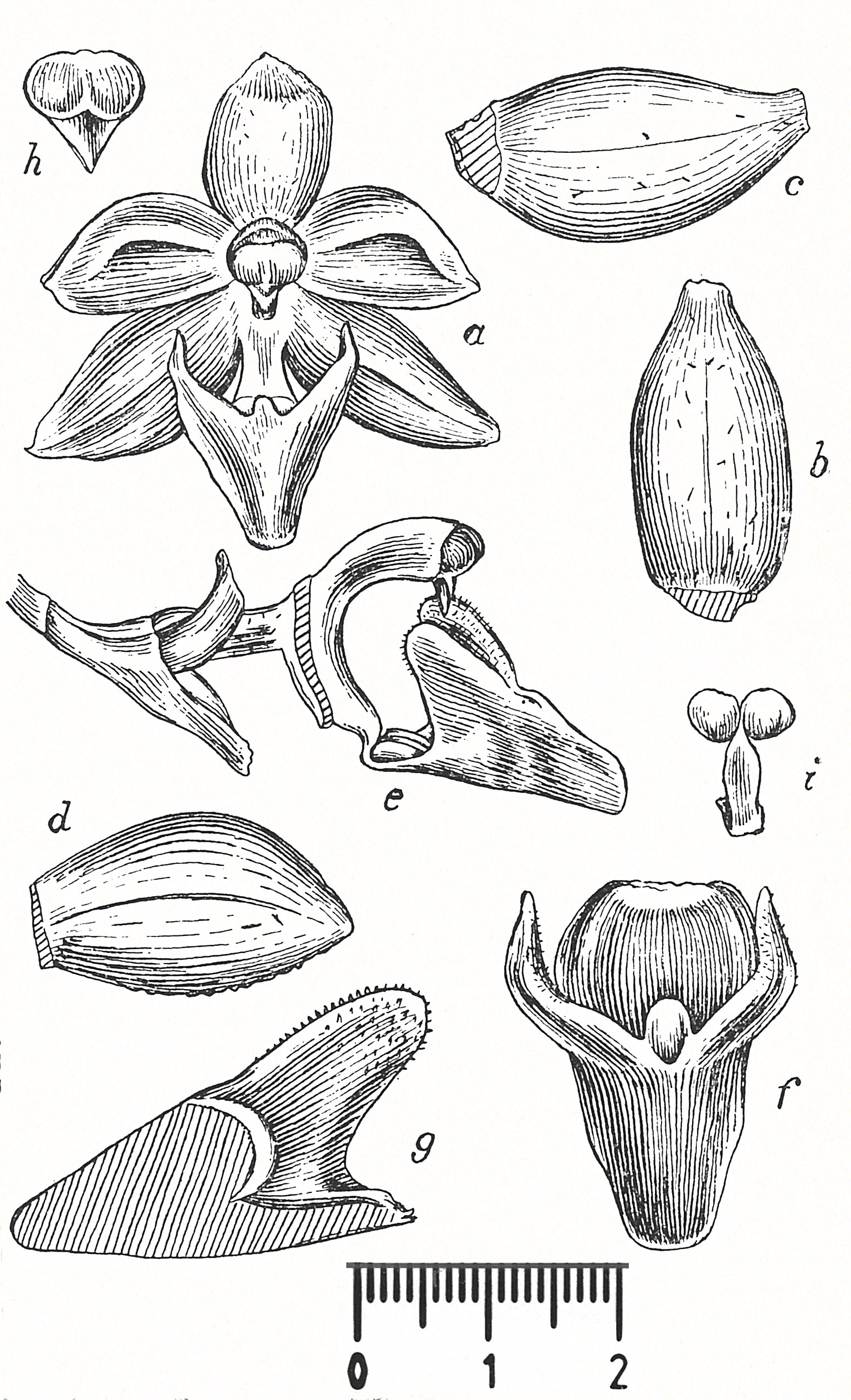
- Botanical illustration of Chroniochilus minimus

Scientific classification
- Kingdom: Plantae
- Clade: Tracheophytes
- Clade: Angiosperms
- Clade: Monocots
- Order: Asparagales
- Family: Orchidaceae
- Subfamily: Epidendroideae
- Tribe: Vandeae
- Subtribe: Aeridinae
- Genus: Chroniochilus; J.J.Sm., 1918

Type species
- Chroniochilus tjidadapense J.J.Sm.

= Chroniochilus =

Genus of orchids

Chroniochilus is a genus of flowering plants from the orchid family, Orchidaceae. It contains 5 species, native to Yunnan, Thailand, Malaysia and Indonesia.

== Taxonomy ==
=== Species ===
1. C. ecalcaratus (Holttum) Garay - Pahang, Sabah
2. C. minimus (Blume) J.J.Sm. - Borneo, Java, Malaysia
3. C. sinicus L.J.Chen & Z.J.Liu - Yunnan
4. C. thrixspermoides (Schltr.) Garay - Sumatra
5. C. virescens (Ridl.) Holttum - Thailand, Borneo, Sumatra, Malaysia

== Description ==
=== Generative characteristics ===
Chroniochilus produces small flowers on racemose inflorescences. The conical, fleshy, mobile labellum does not bear a spur. The androecium consists of two pollinia. In Chroniochilus sinicus, flowering occurs from August to October.

== Etymology ==
The generic name Chroniochilus is derived from the Greek chronios, meaning lasting or persistent, and cheilos, meaning lip.

== Conservation ==
It has been recommended to categorize Chroniochilus sinicus as endangered (EN) according to the IUCN Red List criteria.
