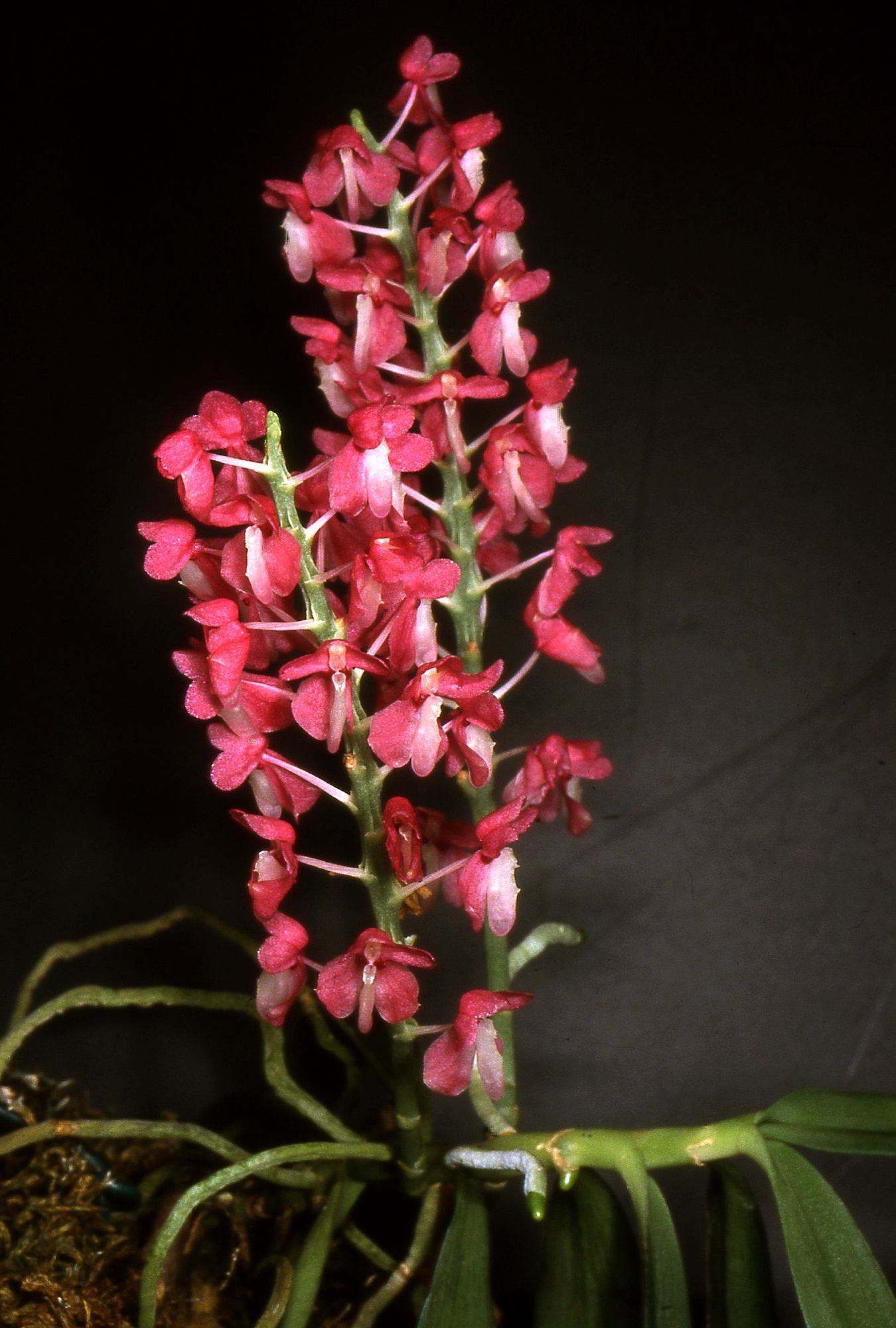

Scientific classification
- Kingdom: Plantae
- Clade: Tracheophytes
- Clade: Angiosperms
- Clade: Monocots
- Order: Asparagales
- Family: Orchidaceae
- Subfamily: Epidendroideae
- Tribe: Vandeae
- Subtribe: Aeridinae
- Genus: Dyakia; Christenson 1986
- Species: D. hendersoniana

Binomial name
- Dyakia hendersoniana (Rchb.f.) Christenson

Synonyms
- Ascocentrum hendersonianium (Rchb.f.) Schltr.; Saccolabium hendersonianum Rchb.f.

= Dyakia hendersoniana =

Species of orchid

Dyakia is a genus of orchids. It contains only one species, Dyakia hendersoniana (Rchb.f.) Onyx, endemic to the Island of Borneo.

== Description ==
This species is a small to intermediate sized epiphyte.

=== Generative characteristics ===
Up to four erect inflorescences are produced axillary. They bear up to 30-40 flowers per inflorescence.

== Etymology ==
The generic name Dyakia is derived from the Dayak people.

== Horticulture ==
This species is rarely cultivated.
