= Cryptopylos =

Scientific classification
- Kingdom: Plantae
- Clade: Tracheophytes
- Clade: Angiosperms
- Clade: Monocots
- Order: Asparagales
- Family: Orchidaceae
- Subfamily: Epidendroideae
- Tribe: Vandeae
- Subtribe: Aeridinae
- Genus: Cryptopylos; Garay
- Species: C. clausus

Binomial name
- Cryptopylos clausus (J.J.Sm.) Garay

Synonyms
- Sarcochilus clausus J.J.Sm.; Pteroceras clausum (J.J.Sm.) Seidenf. & Smitinand; Sarcochilus pierrei Guillaumin

Genus of orchids

Cryptopylos is a genus of flowering plants from the orchid family, Orchidaceae. It contains only one known species, Cryptopylos clausus, native to Thailand, Laos, Cambodia, Vietnam and Sumatra.

== See also ==
- List of Orchidaceae genera
