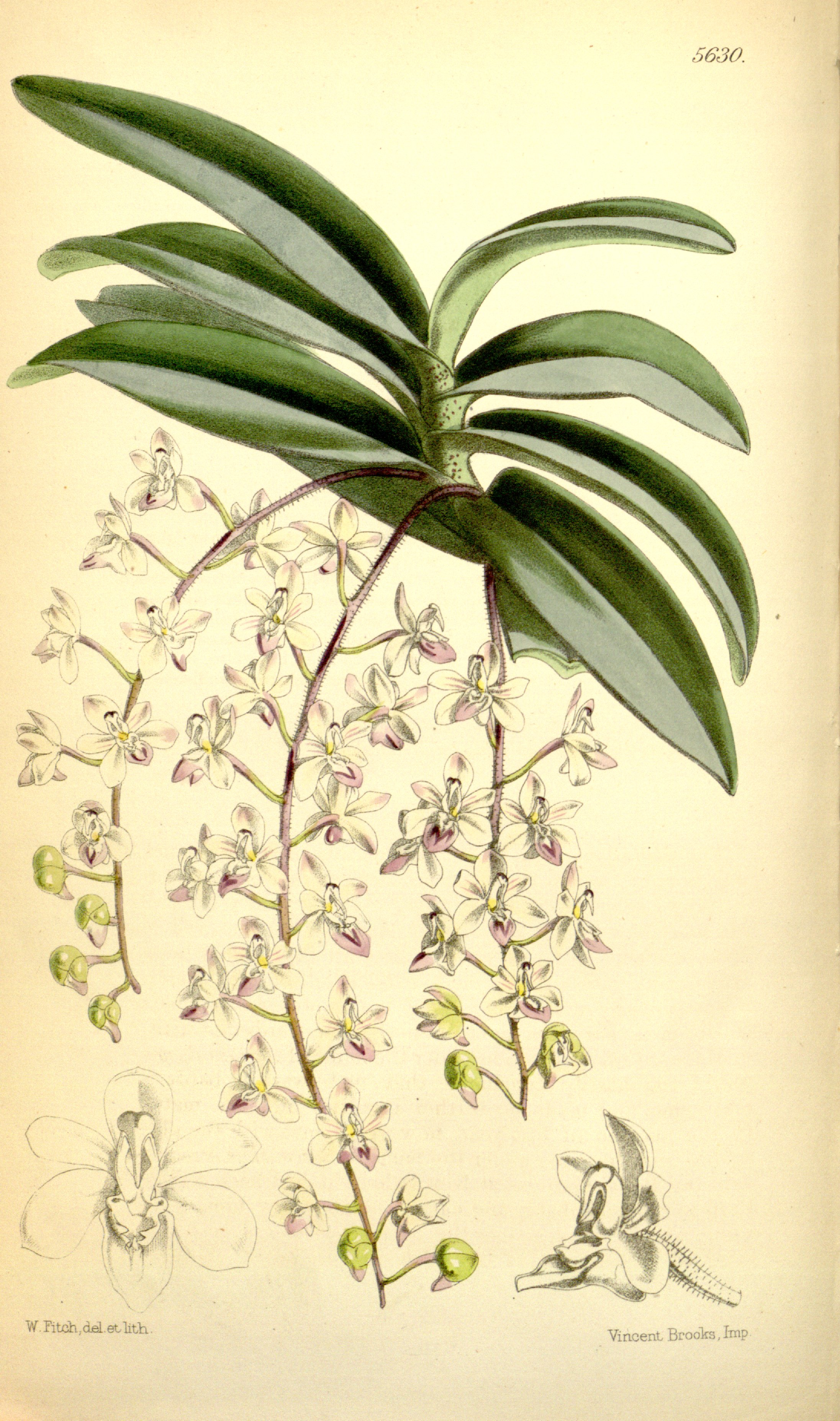
- Illustration of Stereochilus erinaceus (as syn. Sarcanthus erinaceus)

Scientific classification
- Kingdom: Plantae
- Clade: Tracheophytes
- Clade: Angiosperms
- Clade: Monocots
- Order: Asparagales
- Family: Orchidaceae
- Subfamily: Epidendroideae
- Tribe: Vandeae
- Subtribe: Aeridinae
- Genus: Stereochilus; Lindl.

Type species
- Stereochilus hirtus Lindl.

= Stereochilus (plant) =

Genus of orchids

Stereochilus is a genus of orchids native to the Himalayas, Indochina and the Philippines.

Species accepted as of June 2014:

- Stereochilus brevirachis Christenson - Vietnam, Yunnan
- Stereochilus dalatensis (Guillaumin) Garay - Vietnam, Yunnan, Thailand
- Stereochilus erinaceus (Rchb.f.) Garay - Vietnam, Peninsular Malaysia, Thailand
- Stereochilus hirtus Lindl. - Sikkim, Bhutan, Assam, Myanmar
- Stereochilus laxus (Rchb.f.) Garay - Myanmar
- Stereochilus pachyphyllus (Cavestro) Cavestro - Thailand
- Stereochilus ringens (Rchb.f.) Garay - Assam, Philippines
