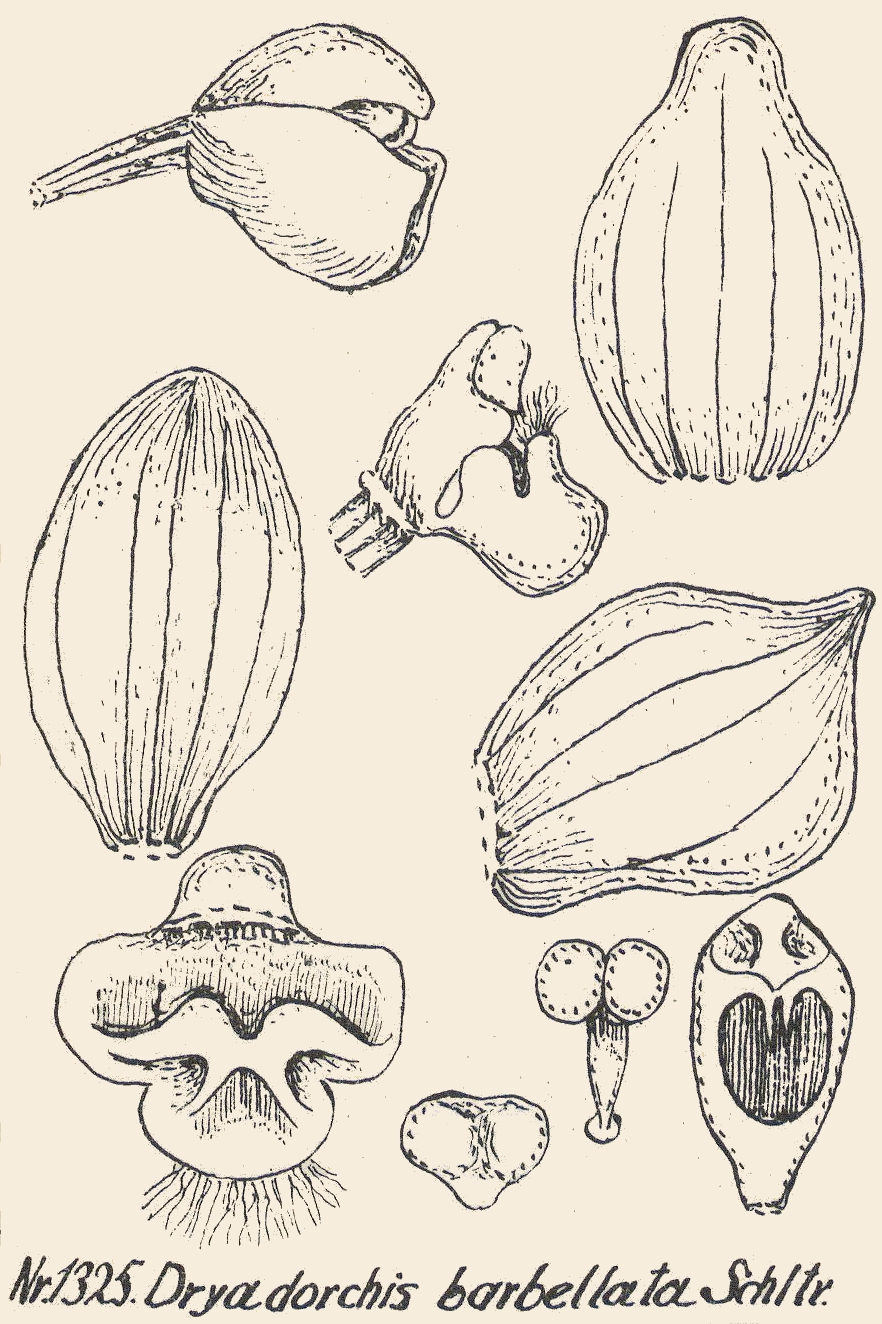
- Dryadorchis barbellata

Scientific classification
- Kingdom: Plantae
- Clade: Tracheophytes
- Clade: Angiosperms
- Clade: Monocots
- Order: Asparagales
- Family: Orchidaceae
- Subfamily: Epidendroideae
- Tribe: Vandeae
- Subtribe: Aeridinae
- Genus: Dryadorchis; Schltr.
- Distribution of Dryadorchis. It is endemic to New Guinea.

= Dryadorchis =

Genus of orchids

Dryadorchis is a genus of flowering plants from the orchid family, Orchidaceae. It is endemic to New Guinea.

== Description ==
The stems are very short, and they bear subfalcate leaves. The racemose inflorescences have a swollen rhachis. They produce short-lived flowers with a long, slim column, which houses four pollinia. The unspurred labellum has a concavity in its centre.

== Etymology ==
The genus name of Dryadorchis refers to Dryad, a tree nymph or tree spirit in Greek mythology.

== Ecology ==
Dryadorchis grows epiphytically at elevations of 0-1700 m above sea level.

== Taxonomy ==
=== Proposed merging with other genera ===
It was proposed to merge this genus with Sarcochilus and Thrixspermum, which however was rejected.

=== Species ===
It contains 5 known species, which are all endemic to New Guinea:

- Dryadorchis barbellata Schltr.
- Dryadorchis dasystele Schuit. & de Vogel
- Dryadorchis huliorum (Schuit.) Christenson & Schuit.
- Dryadorchis minor Schltr.
- Dryadorchis singularis (J.J.Sm.) Christenson & Schuit.

== See also ==
- List of Orchidaceae genera
