= Eclecticus chungii =

Scientific classification
- Kingdom: Plantae
- Clade: Tracheophytes
- Clade: Angiosperms
- Clade: Monocots
- Order: Asparagales
- Family: Orchidaceae
- Subfamily: Epidendroideae
- Tribe: Vandeae
- Subtribe: Aeridinae
- Genus: Eclecticus; P.O'Byrne
- Species: E. chungii

Binomial name
- Eclecticus chungii P.O'Byrne

Species of plant

Eclecticus is a genus of flowering plants belonging to the family Orchidaceae. The only species is Eclecticus chungii.

Its native range is Indochina.
