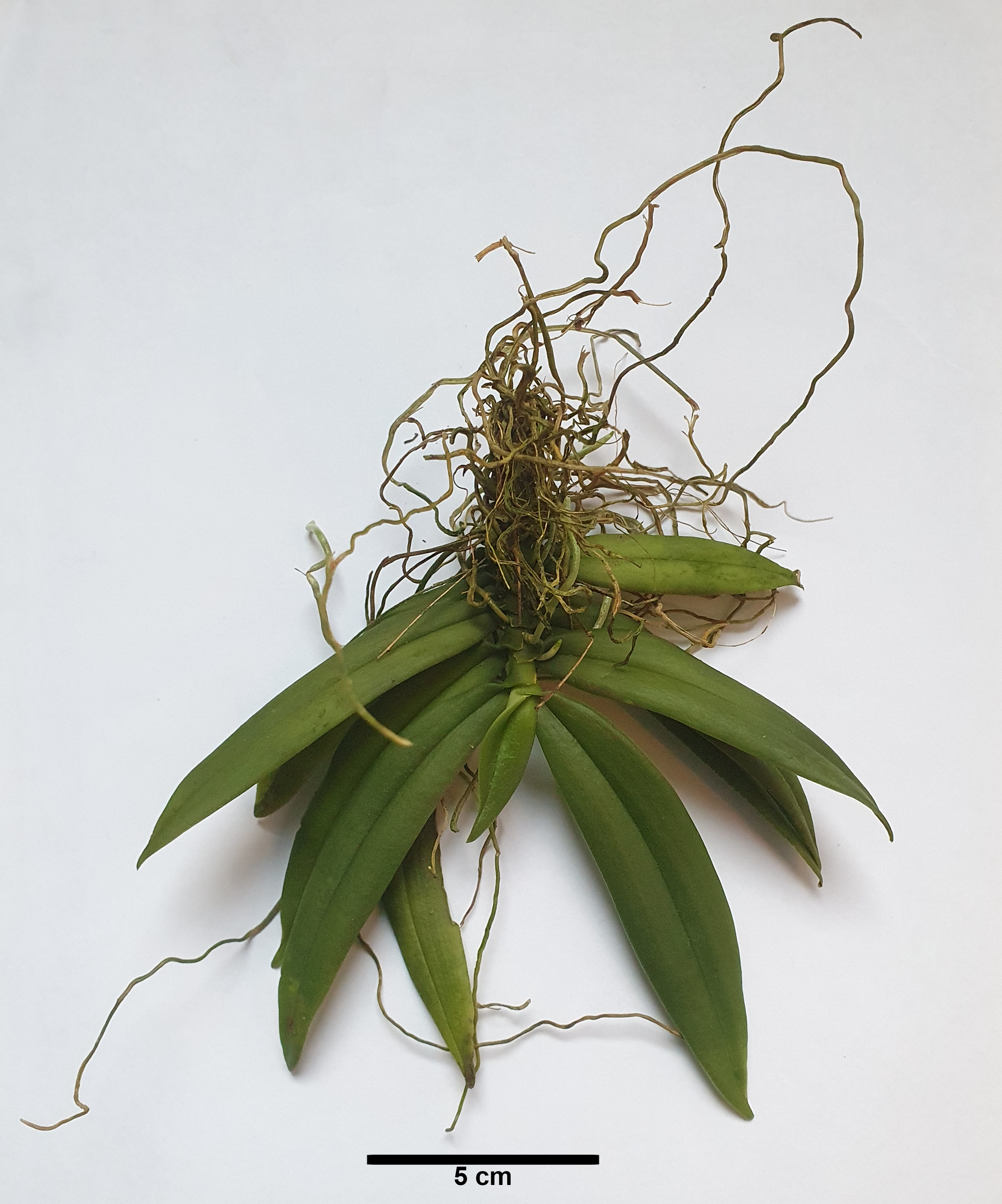
- Mature Grosourdya appendiculata (Blume) Rchb.f. specimen
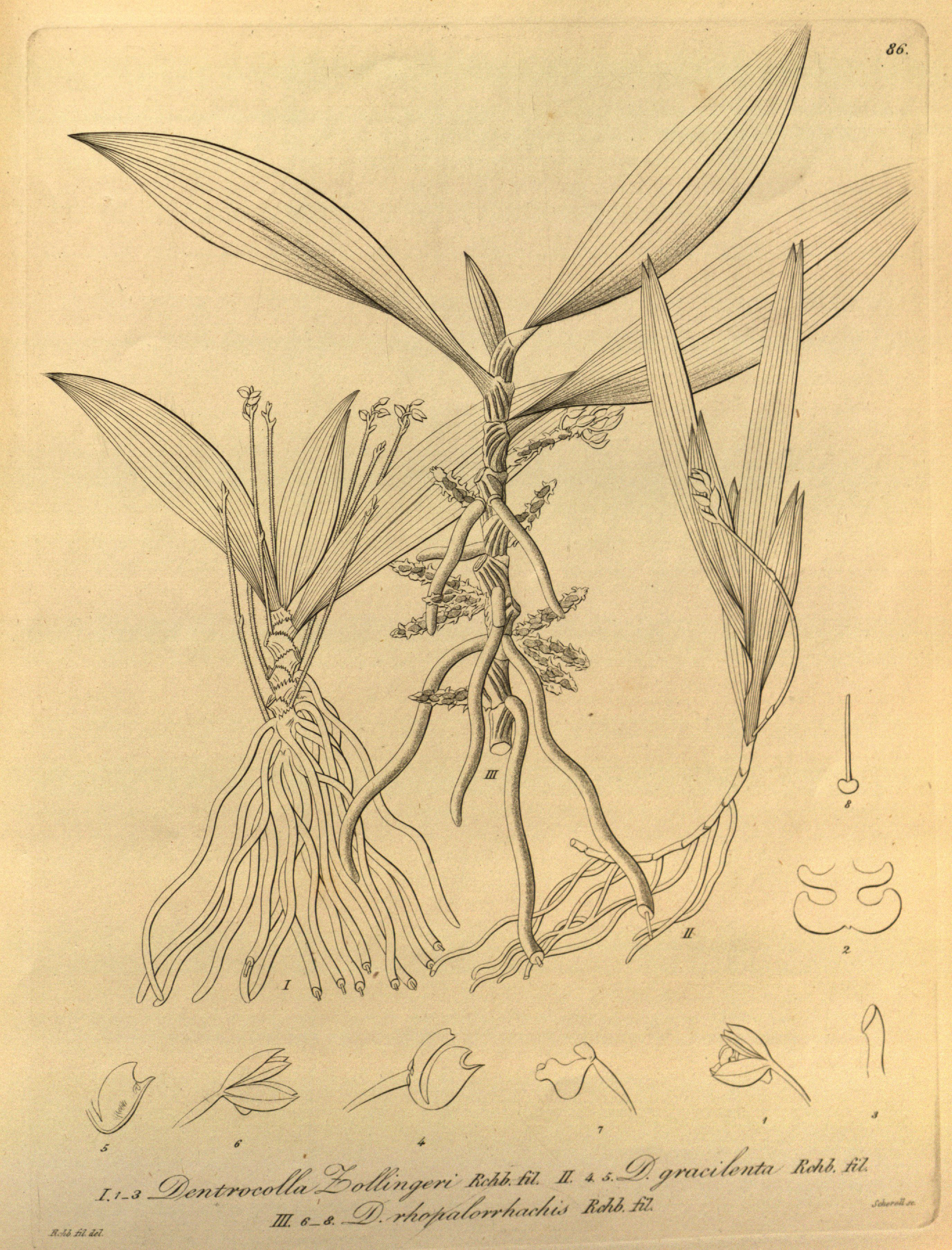
- Grosourdya zollingeri (as Dendrocolla zollingeri) - Dendrocolla gracilenta - Tuberolabium rhopalorrhachis (as Dendrocolla rhopalorrhachis) - Xenia vol 1 pl 86 (1858)

Scientific classification
- Kingdom: Plantae
- Clade: Tracheophytes
- Clade: Angiosperms
- Clade: Monocots
- Order: Asparagales
- Family: Orchidaceae
- Subfamily: Epidendroideae
- Tribe: Vandeae
- Subtribe: Aeridinae
- Genus: Grosourdya; Rchb.f.

Synonyms
- Ascochilopsis Carr; Ascochilus Ridl.; Theana Aver.

= Grosourdya =

Genus of orchids

Grosourdya is a genus of flowering plants from the orchid family, Orchidaceae. As of May 2022, it contains 26 known species, native to Southeast Asia.

- Grosourdya appendiculata (Blume) Rchb.f. - widespread from Hainan to the Andaman Islands to the Philippines and Maluku
- Grosourdya bicornuta J.J.Wood & A.L.Lamb - Sabah
- Grosourdya bigibba (Schltr.) Kocyan & Schuit.
- Grosourdya callifera Seidenf. - Thailand
- Grosourdya ciliata (Ridl.) Kocyan & Schuit.
- Grosourdya decipiens (J.J.Sm.) Kocyan & Schuit.
- Grosourdya emarginata (Blume) Rchb.f.
- Grosourdya fasciculata (Carr) Kocyan & Schuit.
- Grosourdya incurvicalcar (J.J.Sm.) Garay - Java, Peninsular Malaysia, Sulawesi
- Grosourdya leytensis (Ames) Kocyan & Schuit.
- Grosourdya lobata (J.J.Wood & A.L.Lamb) Kocyan & Schuit.
- Grosourdya milneri P.O'Byrne, Gokusing & J.J.Wood
- Grosourdya mindanaensis (Ames) Kocyan & Schuit.
- Grosourdya minutiflora (Ridl.) Garay - Pahang
- Grosourdya minutissima P.T.Ong & P.O'Byrne
- Grosourdya multistrata P.O'Byrne, J.J.Verm. & S.M.L.Lee
- Grosourdya muscosa (Rolfe) Garay - Peninsular Malaysia, Thailand, Andaman Islands
- Grosourdya myosurus (Ridl.) Kocyan & Schuit.
- Grosourdya nitida (Seidenf.) Kocyan & Schuit.
- Grosourdya pulvinifera (Schltr.) Garay - Sabah, Sulawesi
- Grosourdya quinquelobata (Schltr.) Garay - Sulawesi
- Grosourdya reflexicalcar P.O'Byrne & J.J.Verm.
- Grosourdya tripercus (Ames) Garay - Leyte
- Grosourdya urunensis J.J.Wood, C.L.Chan & A.L.Lamb - Sabah
- Grosourdya vietnamica (Aver.) Kumar & S.W.Gale
- Grosourdya zollingeri (Rchb.f.) Rchb.f. - Java, Maluku

== See also ==
- List of Orchidaceae genera
