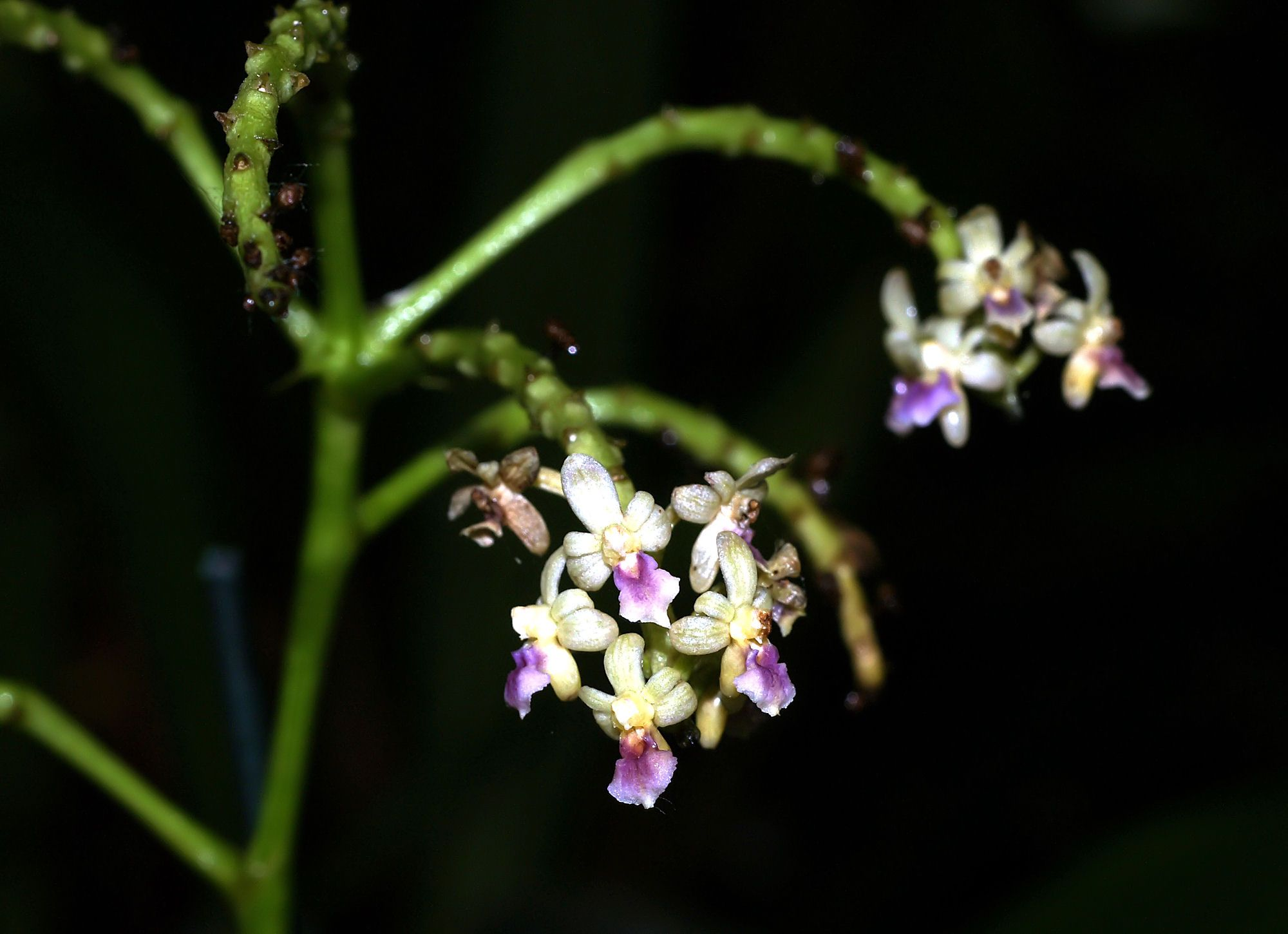
- Sarcophyton pachyphyllum

Scientific classification
- Kingdom: Plantae
- Clade: Tracheophytes
- Clade: Angiosperms
- Clade: Monocots
- Order: Asparagales
- Family: Orchidaceae
- Subfamily: Epidendroideae
- Tribe: Vandeae
- Subtribe: Aeridinae
- Genus: Sarcophyton; Garay

= Sarcophyton (plant) =

Genus of orchids

Sarcophyton is a genus of flowering plants from the orchid family, Orchidaceae. It has three known species, native to Taiwan and the Philippines:

- Sarcophyton crassifolium (Lindl. & Paxton) Garay - Philippines
- Sarcophyton pachyphyllum (Ames) Garay - Philippines
- Sarcophyton taiwanianum (Hayata) Garay - Taiwan

== See also ==
- List of Orchidaceae genera
