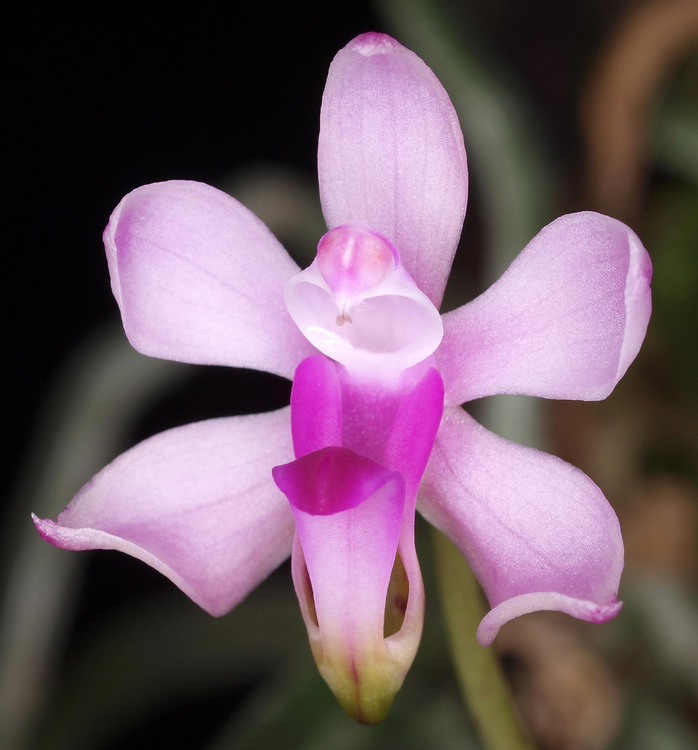

Scientific classification
- Kingdom: Plantae
- Clade: Tracheophytes
- Clade: Angiosperms
- Clade: Monocots
- Order: Asparagales
- Family: Orchidaceae
- Subfamily: Epidendroideae
- Genus: Phalaenopsis
- Species: P. taenialis

Binomial name
- Phalaenopsis taenialis (Lindl.) Christenson & Pradhan

Synonyms
- Aerides taenialis Lindl.; Doritis taenialis (Lindl.) Benth. ex Hook.f.; Kingiella taenialis (Lindl.) Rolfe; Biermannia taenialis (Lindl.) Tang & F.T.Wang; Kingidium taeniale (Lindl.) P.F.Hunt; Polychilos taenialis (Lindl.) Shim; Aerides carnosa Griff.; Doritis braceana Hook.f.; Phalaenopsis braceana (Hook.f.) Christenson; Kingidium braceanum (Hook.f.) Seidenf.; Biermannia navicularis Tang & F.T.Wang ex Gruss & Rollke; Kingidium naviculare Z.H.Tsi

= Phalaenopsis taenialis =

Species of orchid

Phalaenopsis taenialis, also known as 小尖囊蝴蝶兰 (xiao jian nang hu die lan) in Chinese, is a species of epiphytic orchid occurring from the eastern Himalaya to China (Yunnan). The specific epithet taenialis is derived from the long, flattened roots, which resemble tapeworms. The specific epithet taenialis, from the Latin taenia, means ribbon or band.

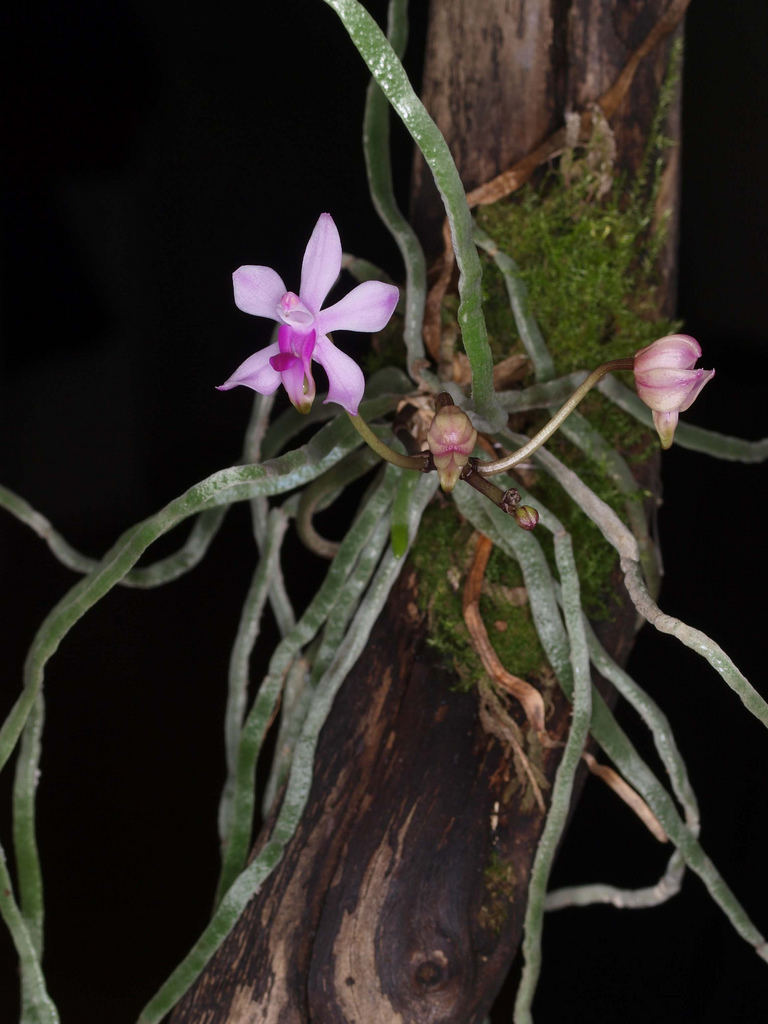
Entire plant exhibiting leaflessness during anthesis

== Description ==
This species has flattened, verrucose roots, which arise from inconspicuous stems bearing few, deciduous, 1–3.5 cm long and 4–13 cm long leaves. The leaves are usually shed during flowering or dry seasons, but commonly one leaf persists. Flowering occurs in June and 1–2 widely opening, pale pink to rose purple flowers are produced on 6.5–19 cm long, axillary racemes. The column is broadly dilated at the stigma. The anther cap is subglobose. The labellum has a sub-cylindric spur, which points downward in a right angle to the ovary.
The chromosome count is 2n = 36, 38, 40, 57.

== Taxonomy ==
This species closely resembles the newly published species Phalaenopsis arunachalensis, which as of March 2022 is not currently accepted by the World Checklist of Selected Plant Families (WCSP) of the Royal Botanic Gardens Kew, as well as Phalaenopsis honghenensis. This adds further complexity to the taxonomy of Phalaenopsis subgen. Aphyllae.

=== Synonymy with Phalaenopsis braceana ===
The flowers of Phalaenopsis taenialis turn yellow or orange as a result of post-pollination changes. This change can also be caused by stress. This makes flowers less attractive to potential pollinators. The original description of Doritis braceana was based on Phalaenopsis taenialis specimens showing these changes in flower colour. The name Phalaenopsis braceana has been erroneously applied to several species. However, its only correct use is as a synonym of Phalaenopsis taenialis.

== Cultivation ==
Established plants are relatively easy to cultivate mounted on driftwood or cork bark. The flattened roots of tapeworm like appearance should be handled with great care. It benefits from warm, humid conditions in summer and cool, dry conditions in winter. This mimics the climate it is adapted to.

== Ecology ==
This species occurs epiphytically on tree trunks at elevations of 1100–2200 m above sea level. It grows on a variety of broad-leaved phorophytes with smooth or rough bark, such as oaks and Rhododendron. It is found in shady conditions.

== Phytochemistry ==
The alkaloid Phalaenopsin La has been isolated from this species. Unlike some other Phalaenopsis species, the other form Phalaenopsin T was not present.

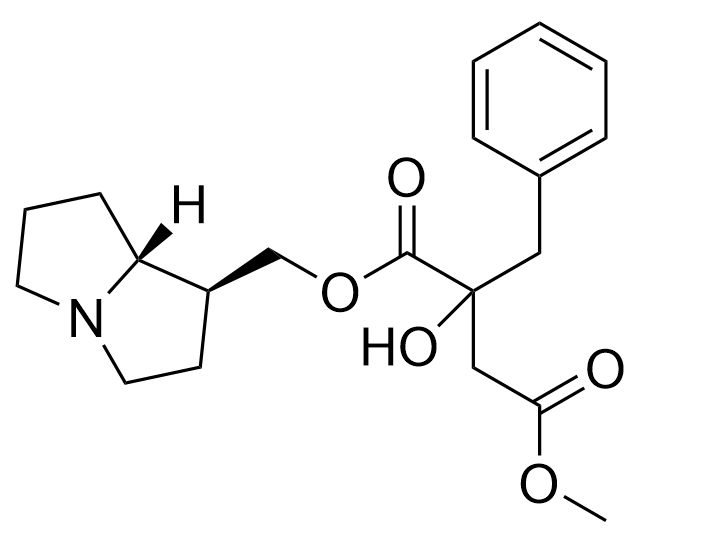
Structure of pyrrolizidine alkaloid Phalaenopsin La

== Conservation ==
This species is abundant in nature and numerous herbarium specimens have been collected. Before the establishment of CITES regulations on international trade, specimens collected from the wild were commonly exported from northeast India. However, this species is threatened due to deforestation and poaching.
