= Aerides lobbii =

The binomial name Aerides lobbii refers to 2 species of orchids:

- Aerides lobbii Lem., a synonym of Aerides multiflora
- Aerides lobbii Teijsm. & Binn, a synonym of Thrixspermum calceolus
