= Thrixspermum changlangensis =

Conservation status
- Critically Endangered (IUCN 3.1)

Scientific classification
- Kingdom: Plantae
- Clade: Tracheophytes
- Clade: Angiosperms
- Clade: Monocots
- Order: Asparagales
- Family: Orchidaceae
- Subfamily: Epidendroideae
- Genus: Thrixspermum
- Species: T. changlangensis

Binomial name
- Thrixspermum changlangensis K.Gogoi

Species of orchid

Thrixspermum changlangensis is a critically endangered species of orchid endemic to Arunachal Pradesh in India. It was described as new species by Khyanjeet Gogoi of The orchid society of Eastern Himalaya in 2019. He collected it from Changlang district in 2014. It is an epipyhtic orchid and resembles Thrixspermum calceolus species closely. As of 2022, it was known only from one location in Arunachal Pradesh.

== Description ==
An epiphytic orchid, it grows upwards from a single point with 10 to 30 cm long stems. Leaves arranged in opposite, lanceolate in shape and coriaceous – 5 to13 cm long and 1.5 to 2 cm wide. The inflorescence is 2 to 2.5 cm long with 1 to 2 flowers. Flowers are 4 to 4.5 cm – white, fleshy and fragrant, lasted for few hours.

The shoes shaped lip was 1.2 to 1.3 cm, orange yellow colored with a white tipped side lobes and base with orange and crimson dots. Sepals are 1.8 to 2.0 cm long and 0.8–1.0 cm broad, lanceolate, acute. Petals are 1.2 to 1.5 × 0.6 to 0.8 cm.

This species can be differentiated from Thrixspermum calceolus by having petals much smaller than sepals, glabrous lip, triangular lobes, calii on lip being glabrous along with other characteristics.

== Taxonomy and etymology ==
Gogoi collected this orchid from Nampong area in Changlang district while travelling to Myanmar. He brought it to the Regional Orchids Germplasm Conservation and Propagation Centre in Assam and cultivated it. When the orchid flowered in May 2018 in the centre, it was compared with the known herbarium species of Thrixspermum and concluded it to be a new species.

This species was named after Changlang district in Arunachal Pradesh from where it was collected.

== Distribution and habitat ==
The species was found growing on trees inside broad-leaved evergreen tropical forests at an elevation 500 metres around Nampong area where it was collected, close to border of Myanmar. No other population in the wild were known as of 2022 apart from the collected specimen that flowered in the Regional Orchids Germplasm Conservation and Propagation Centre in Assam. The area of occupancy is estimated to be 4 km^{2}. It was found flowering during May to June.

== Conservation and threats ==
This orchid was found inside a community forest and estimated that possibly there could be less than 50 mature individuals in the wild. Conservation measure in place was cultivating it in the propagation center in Assam. Since it was found outside protected area threats includes expansion of village and jhum cultivation.
