= Nassophasis foveata =

Scientific classification
- Kingdom: Animalia
- Phylum: Arthropoda
- Class: Insecta
- Order: Coleoptera
- Suborder: Polyphaga
- Infraorder: Cucujiformia
- Family: Curculionidae
- Genus: Nassophasis
- Species: N. foveata

Binomial name
- Nassophasis foveata O.C.Waterhouse, 1879

Species of beetle

Nassophasis foveata is a species of weevil found in India, and Sri Lanka.

It is one of the major orchid pest that attack Aerides fieldingii.
