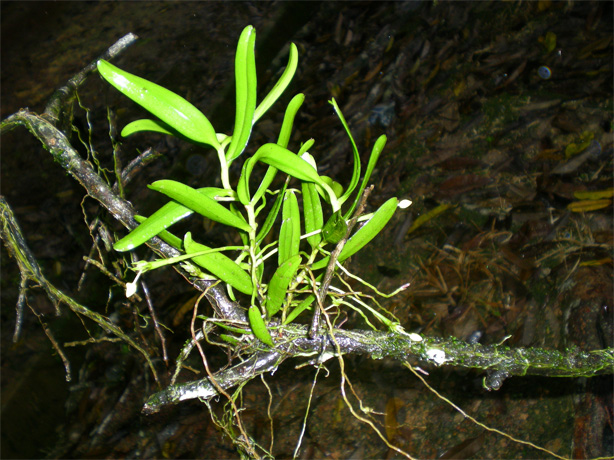

Scientific classification
- Kingdom: Plantae
- Clade: Tracheophytes
- Clade: Angiosperms
- Clade: Monocots
- Order: Asparagales
- Family: Orchidaceae
- Subfamily: Epidendroideae
- Genus: Thrixspermum
- Species: T. trichoglottis

Binomial name
- Thrixspermum trichoglottis (Hook.f.) Kuntze

Synonyms
- Sarcochilus trichoglottis Hook.f.; Dendrocolla trichoglottis (Hook.f.) Ridl.; Dendrocolla alba Ridl.; Thrixspermum album (Ridl.) Schltr.

= Thrixspermum trichoglottis =

Species of orchid

Thrixspermum trichoglottis is a monopodial orchid in the subfamily Epidendroideae. It is widespread across the eastern Himalayas, Yunnan, Indochina, the Andaman & Nicobar Islands, Malaysia and western Indonesia.

== Description ==
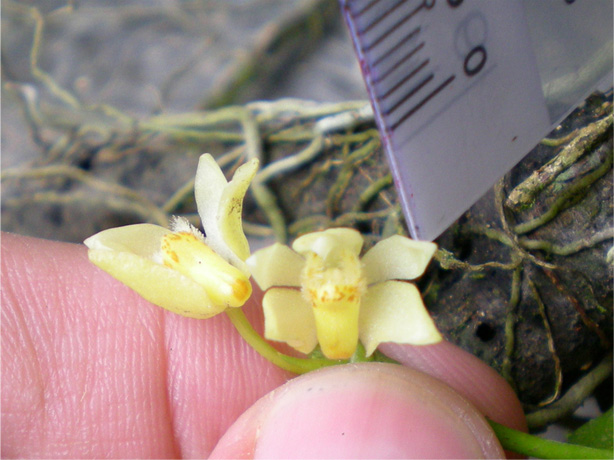
Flower

Morphologies that have been observed in Pasoh Forest Reserve, Malaysia:

- pseudobulb absent
- monopodial
- leaf equally bi-lobulate (young leaves somehow unequal)
- leaves 15 mm x 65 mm, thin and fleshy
- stem sheathed with internode, 1 cm
- stem mildly branched
- rooting throughout, rhizome heavily branched
- inflorescence 1-2 flowers, with a long bract about 10 cm long, scale like
- lateral sepal unevenly rhomboid, 4 x 7 mm
- dorsal sepal elliptic, 2 x 6 mm
- lip 7 x 6 mm with only one lobe
- pubescent at both face of the lobe, with fleshy acute tip
- yellow-orange spots on the outer surfaces near the lip tip
- column small, 3 x 4 mm
- color dimmer than petals and sepals
- pollinia white
