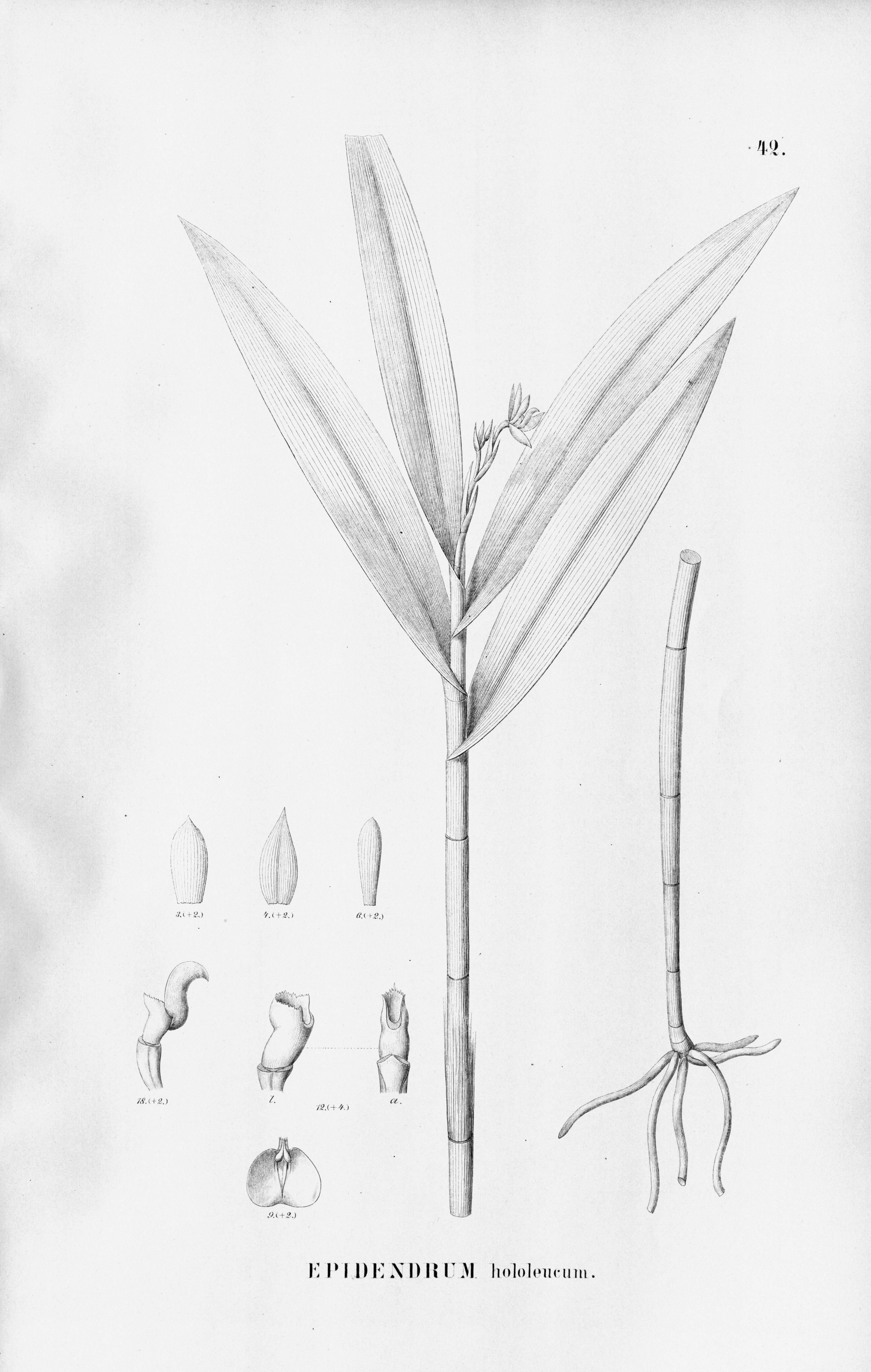

Scientific classification
- Kingdom: Plantae
- Clade: Tracheophytes
- Clade: Angiosperms
- Clade: Monocots
- Order: Asparagales
- Family: Orchidaceae
- Subfamily: Epidendroideae
- Tribe: Epidendreae
- Subtribe: Laeliinae
- Genus: Epidendrum
- Species: E. hololeucum

Binomial name
- Epidendrum hololeucum Barb.Rodr.

= Epidendrum hololeucum =

Species of orchid

Epidendrum hololeucum is an epiphytic species of orchid that falls under the genus Epidendrum, from Brazil. It is considered to be similar to E. caparaoense and E. geniculatum.
