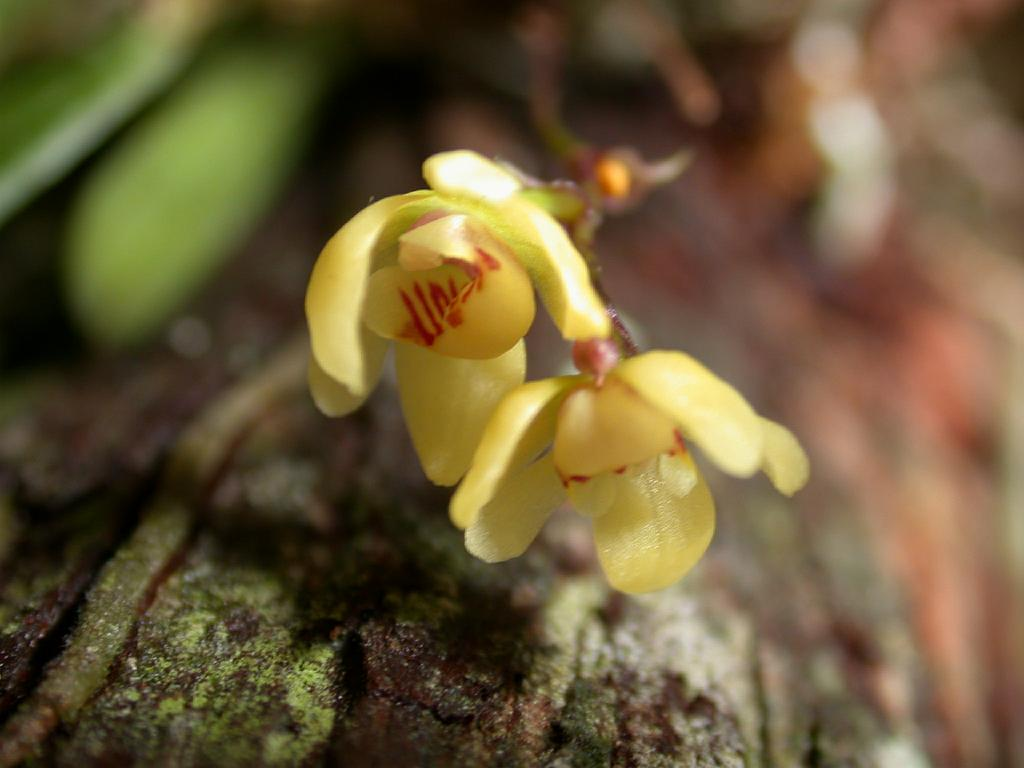

Scientific classification
- Kingdom: Plantae
- Clade: Tracheophytes
- Clade: Angiosperms
- Clade: Monocots
- Order: Asparagales
- Family: Orchidaceae
- Subfamily: Epidendroideae
- Genus: Thrixspermum
- Species: T. japonicum

Binomial name
- Thrixspermum japonicum Rchb.f.

Synonyms
- Sarcochilus japonicus (Rchb.f.) Miq.

= Thrixspermum japonicum =

Species of orchid

Thrixspermum japonicum, known as East Asian thrixspermum, is a species of orchid native to Korea, south-central and southern Japan, and parts of China (Fujian, Guangdong, Guizhou, Hunan, Sichuan, Taiwan).
