= Aerides obyrneana =

Scientific classification
- Kingdom: Plantae
- Clade: Tracheophytes
- Clade: Angiosperms
- Clade: Monocots
- Order: Asparagales
- Family: Orchidaceae
- Subfamily: Epidendroideae
- Genus: Aerides
- Species: A. obyrneana

Binomial name
- Aerides obyrneana Metusala

Species of flowering plant

Aerides obyrneana is an orchid in the subfamily Epidendroideae. It is an epiphyte native to Sulawesi.
