= Aerides augustiana =

Scientific classification
- Kingdom: Plantae
- Clade: Tracheophytes
- Clade: Angiosperms
- Clade: Monocots
- Order: Asparagales
- Family: Orchidaceae
- Subfamily: Epidendroideae
- Genus: Aerides
- Species: A. augustiana

Binomial name
- Aerides augustiana Rolfe

Species of flowering plant

Aerides augustiana is an orchid in the Epidendroideae subfamily. It is an epiphyte native to the Philippines.
