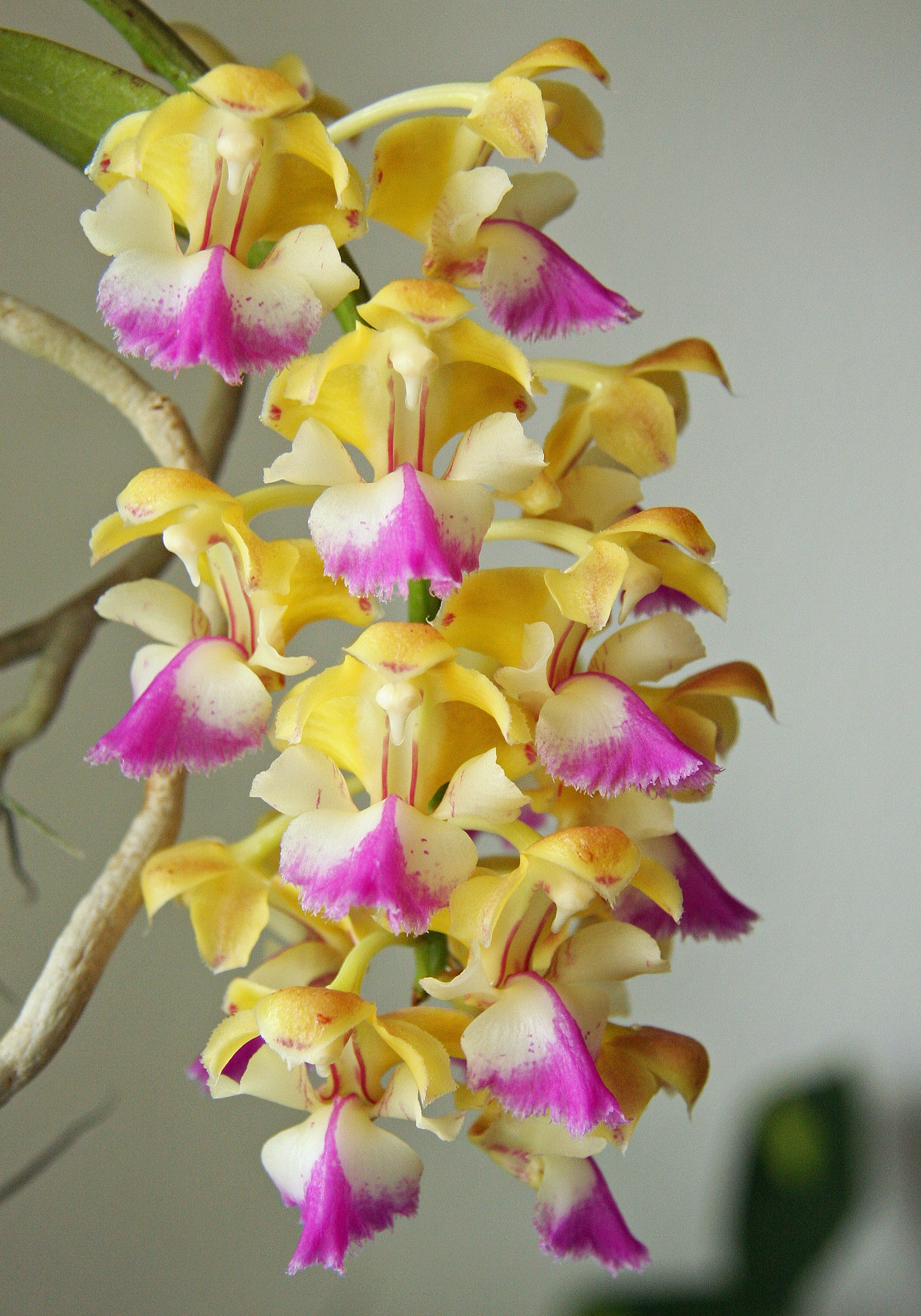
- Close-up of flowers
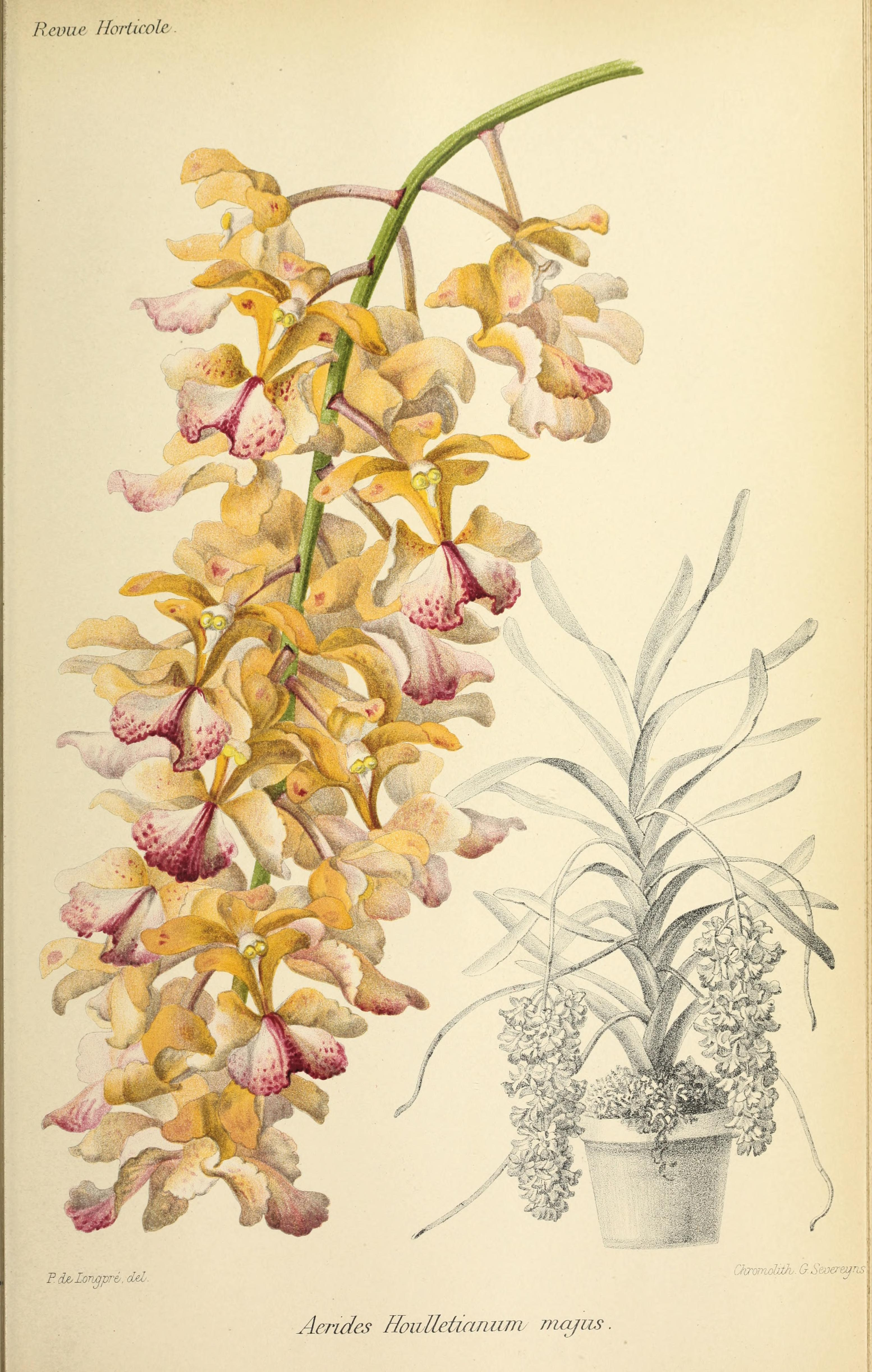
- Botanical illustration

Scientific classification
- Kingdom: Plantae
- Clade: Embryophytes
- Clade: Tracheophytes
- Clade: Angiosperms
- Clade: Monocots
- Order: Asparagales
- Family: Orchidaceae
- Subfamily: Epidendroideae
- Genus: Aerides
- Species: A. houlletiana

Binomial name
- Aerides houlletiana Rchb.f.

Synonyms
- Aerides falcata var. houlletiana (Rchb.f.) A.H.Kent; Aerides houlletiana var. majus André; Aerides picotiana Rchb.f.; Aerides platychila Rolfe

= Aerides houlletiana =

Species of plant

Aerides houlletiana is a species of flowering plant in the family Orchidaceae. It is native to Thailand, Cambodia, Laos, and Vietnam. An epiphytic subshrub, it is typically found in the wet tropics from sea level to 700 m (2,300 ft). There are a large number of award-winning cultivars.

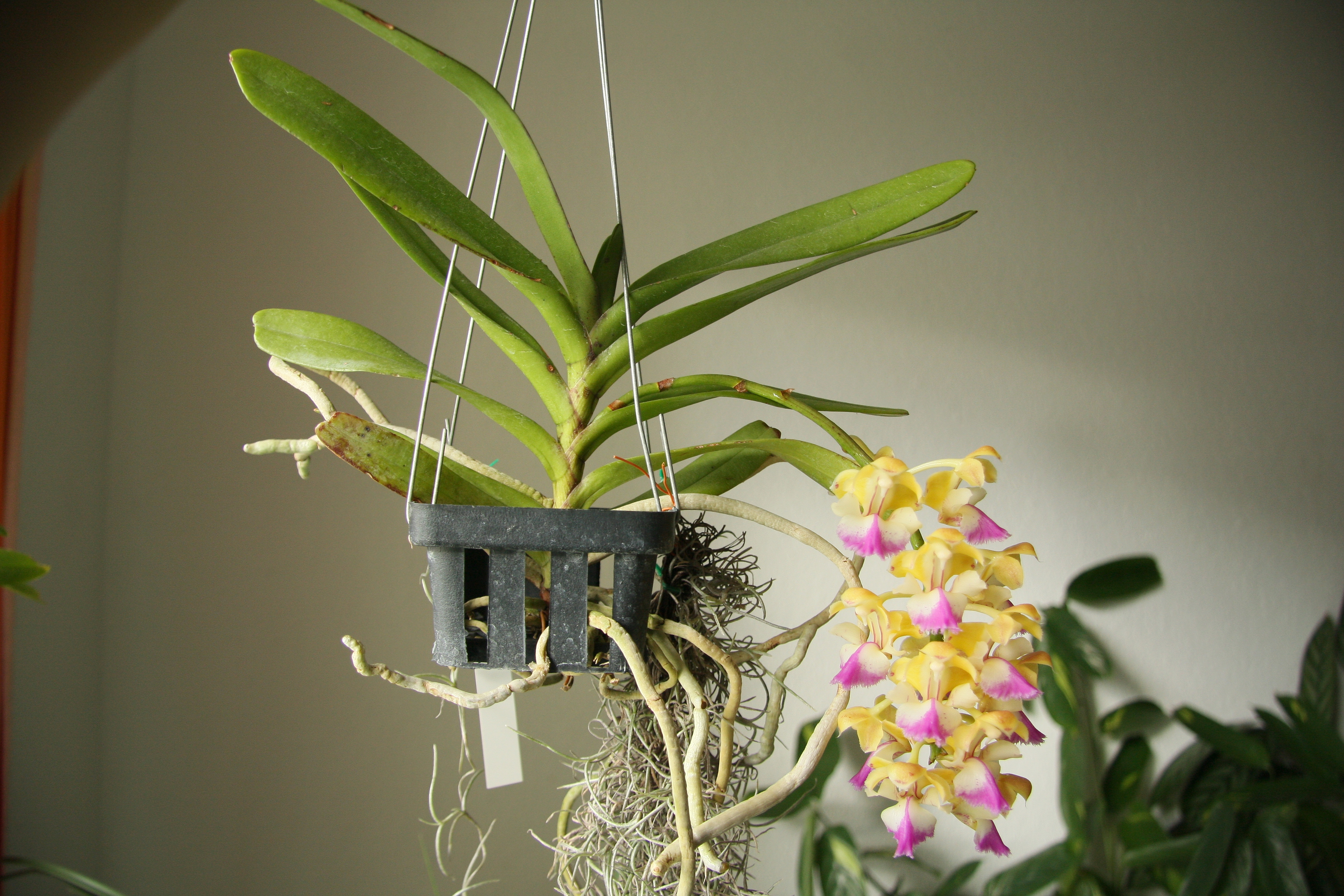
As a houseplant

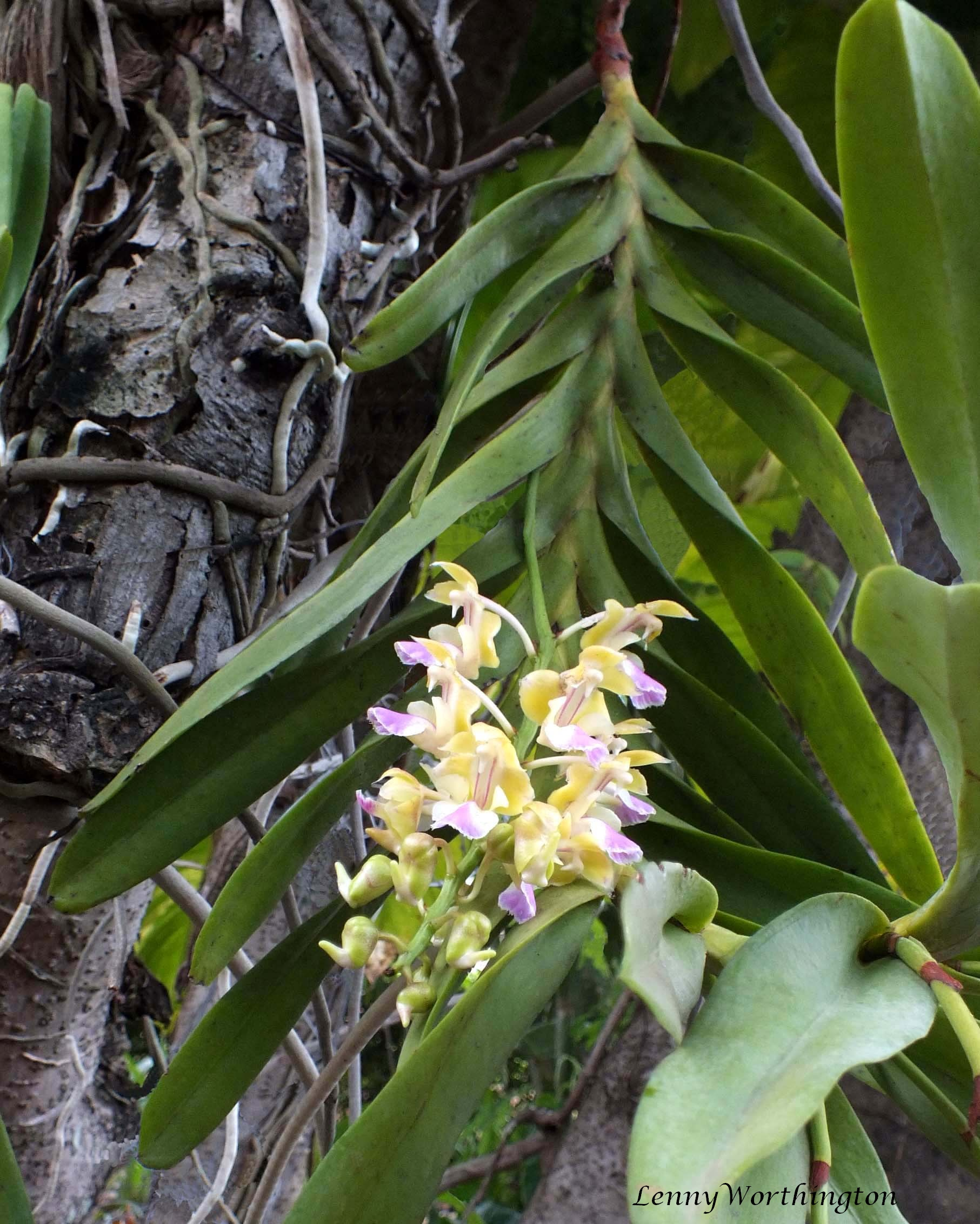
At Phu Laen Kha National Park
