= Aerides orthocentra =

Scientific classification
- Kingdom: Plantae
- Clade: Tracheophytes
- Clade: Angiosperms
- Clade: Monocots
- Order: Asparagales
- Family: Orchidaceae
- Subfamily: Epidendroideae
- Genus: Aerides
- Species: A. orthocentra

Binomial name
- Aerides orthocentra Hand.-Mazz.

Species of orchid

Aerides orthocentra is a species of epiphytic orchid endemic to the Yunnan region of China.
