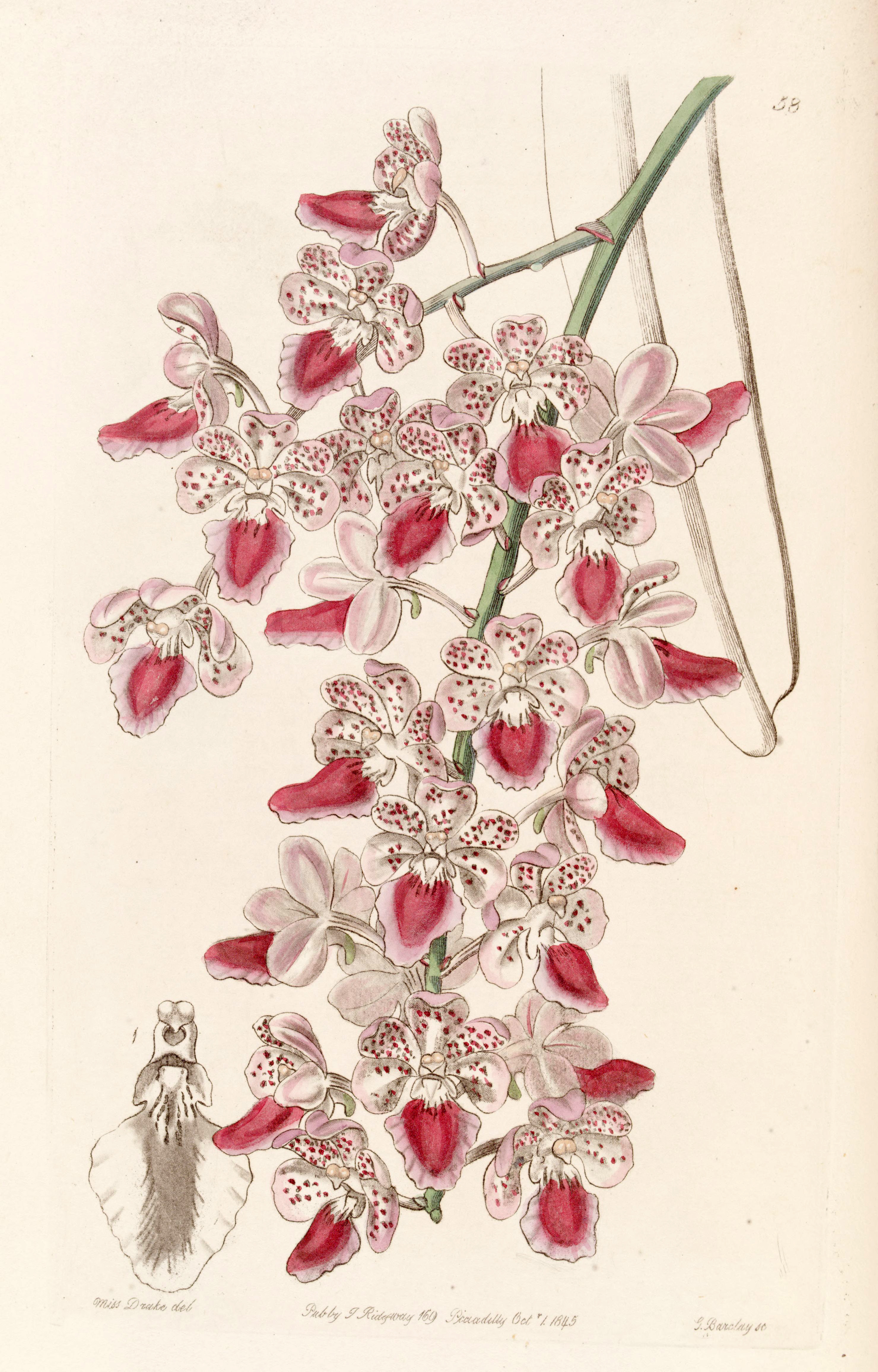
- 1845 illustration

Conservation status
- Least Concern (IUCN 3.1)

Scientific classification
- Kingdom: Plantae
- Clade: Tracheophytes
- Clade: Angiosperms
- Clade: Monocots
- Order: Asparagales
- Family: Orchidaceae
- Subfamily: Epidendroideae
- Genus: Aerides
- Species: A. maculosa

Binomial name
- Aerides maculosa Lindl. (1845)

Synonyms
- Saccolabium speciosum Wight (1851); Aerides schroederi Rchb.f. (1855); Aerides illustris Rchb.f.(1882); Aerides maculosa var. schroederi (Rchb.f.) H.J.Veitch (1891); Gastrochilus speciosus (Wight) Kuntze (1891)

= Aerides maculosa =

Species of orchid

Aerides maculosa is a species of orchid endemic to India. The epithet "maculosa" means "spotted", in reference to the colored spots on the tepals.
