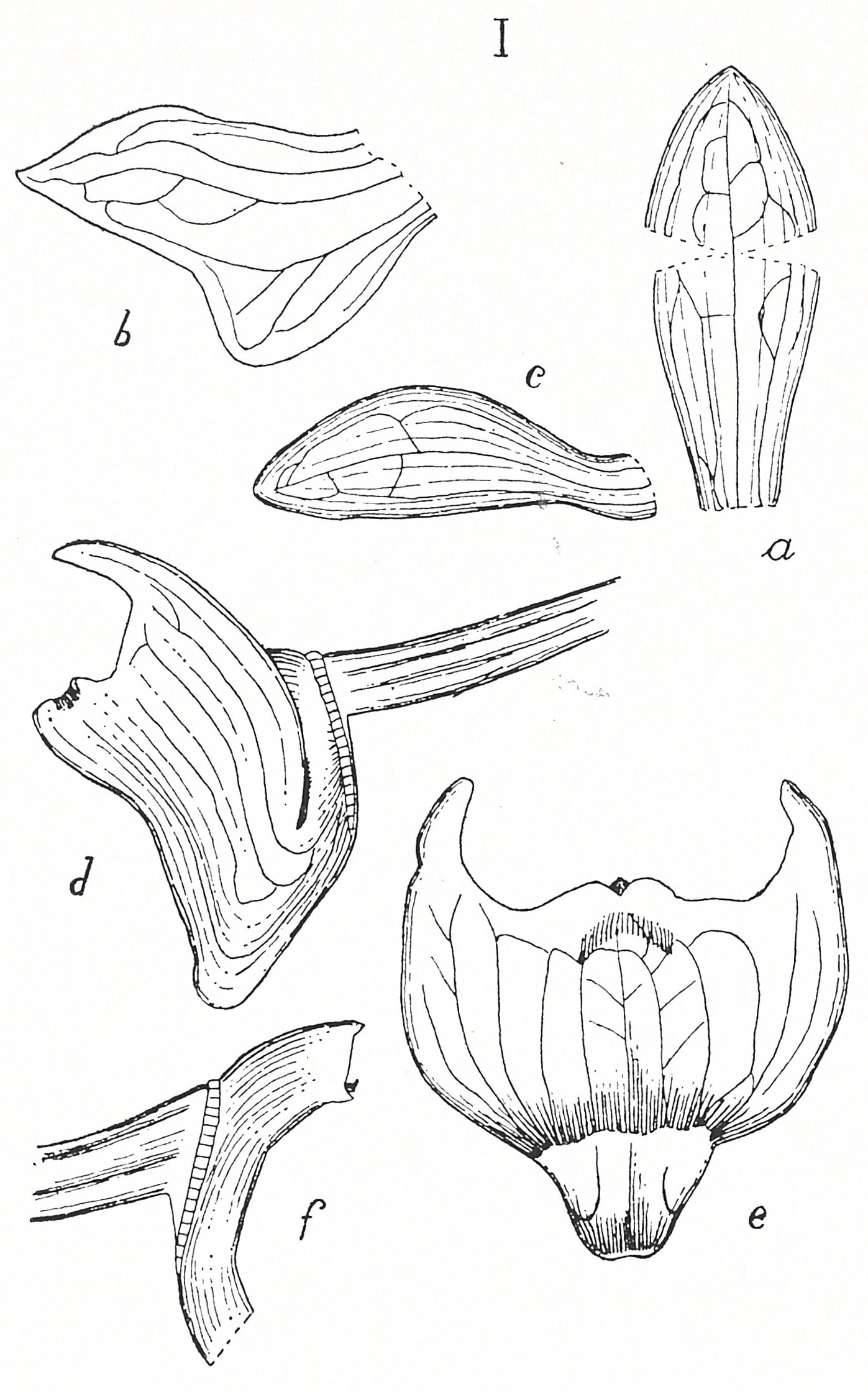
- Thrixspermum carinatifolium (as Thrixspermum batuense var. javanicum)

Scientific classification
- Kingdom: Plantae
- Clade: Tracheophytes
- Clade: Angiosperms
- Clade: Monocots
- Order: Asparagales
- Family: Orchidaceae
- Subfamily: Epidendroideae
- Genus: Thrixspermum
- Species: T. carinatifolium

Binomial name
- Thrixspermum carinatifolium (Ridl.) Schltr.

Synonyms
- Dendrocolla carinatifolia (Ridl.) Ridl.; Sarcochilus carinatifolius Ridl.; Thrixspermum batuense J.J.Sm.; Thrixspermum batuense var. javanicum J.J.Sm.

= Thrixspermum carinatifolium =

Species of orchid

Thrixspermum carinatifolium, commonly known as the Christmas Island hairseed, is an epiphytic orchid with flattened, straggly stems that form clumps with many branching aerial roots. It has flattened fleshy leaves arranged in two ranks along the stems and white or yellowish, widely opening flowers. This orchid occurs from Peninsular Malaysia to Christmas Island, an Australian territory.

== Description ==
Thrixspermum carinatifolium is an epiphytic herb with flattened, straggly stems 100–300 millimetres (3.9–12 in) long and many wiry, branching roots. It has between five and ten elliptic leaves 50–70 millimetres (2.0–2.8 in) long, 15–20 millimetres (0.59–0.79 in) wide with a rounded tip and arranged in two ranks. The flowers are white to yellowish, 16–20 millimetres (0.63–0.79 in) long and wide arranged on a stiff, wiry flowering stem 120–240 millimetres (4.7–9.4 in) long. The sepals and petals spread widely apart from each other, the sepals 8–9 millimetres (0.31–0.35 in) long and about 3 millimetres (0.12 in) wide, the petals shorter and narrower than the sepals. The labellum is about 7 millimetres (0.28 in) long and 4 millimetres (0.16 in) wide with three lobes. The side lobes are about 7 millimetres (0.28 in) long, narrow, curved and pointed. The middle lobe is thick and egg-shaped with a curved sac and rounded callus. Flowering occurs sporadically.

== Taxonomy and naming ==
The Christmas Island hairseed was first formally described in 1891 by Henry Ridley who gave it the name Sarcochilus carinitifolius and published the description in the Journal of the Straits Branch of the Royal Asiatic Society. In 1911, Rudolf Schlechter changed the name to Thrixspermum carinatifolium. The specific epithet (carinatifolium) is derived from the Latin words carinatus meaning "keeled" and folium meaning "leaf".

== Distribution and habitat ==
Thrixspermum carinatifolium grows on the upper branches of rainforest trees, sometimes near the sea. It occurs in Java, southeast Johor and Aur Island in Peninsular Malaysia, Sumatra and Christmas Island.
