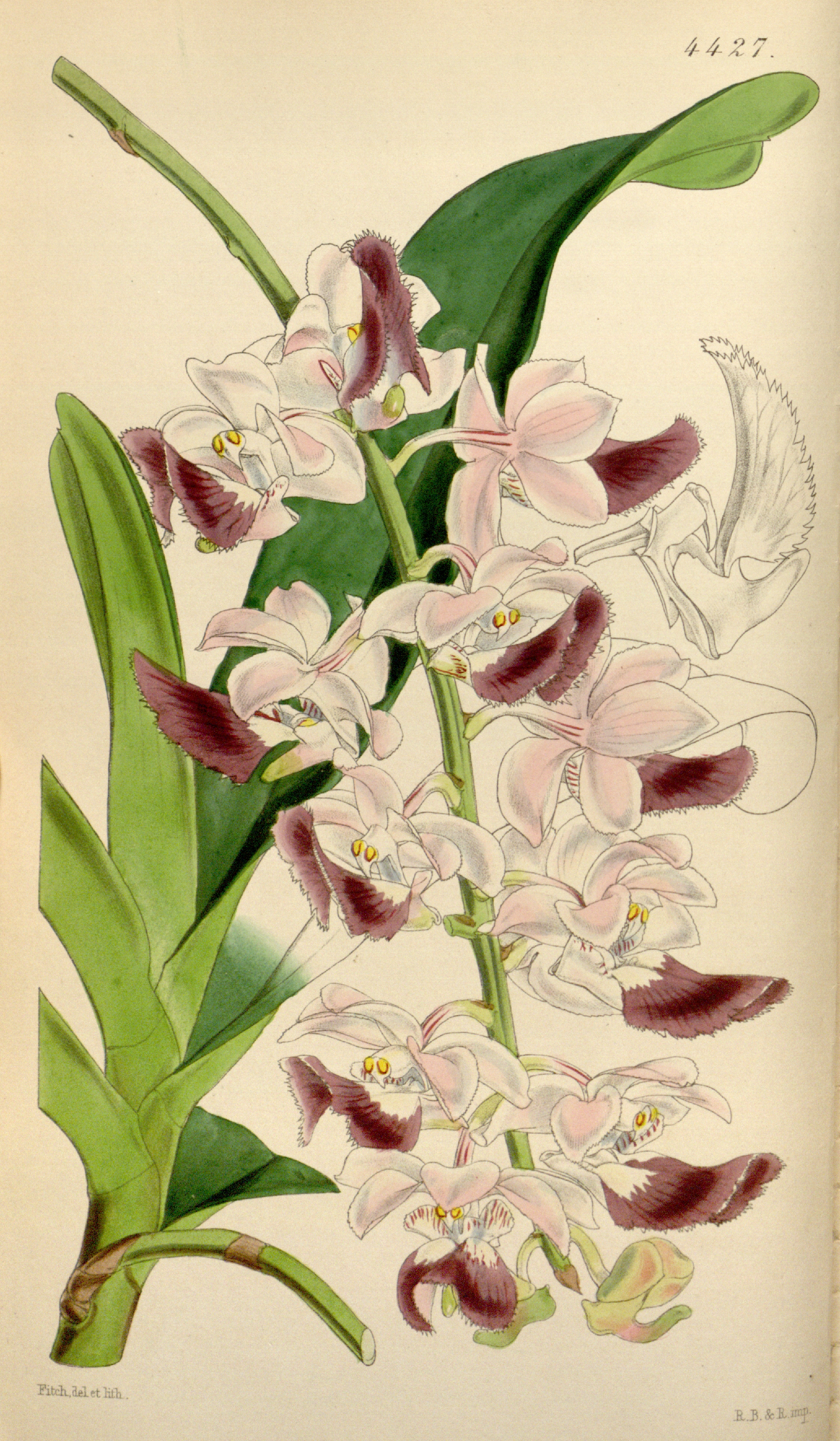
- 1848 illustration

Conservation status
- Least Concern (IUCN 3.1)

Scientific classification
- Kingdom: Plantae
- Clade: Tracheophytes
- Clade: Angiosperms
- Clade: Monocots
- Order: Asparagales
- Family: Orchidaceae
- Subfamily: Epidendroideae
- Genus: Aerides
- Species: A. crispa

Binomial name
- Aerides crispa Lindl. (1833)

Synonyms
- Aerides brookei Bateman ex Lindl. (1841); Aerides brockessii Heynh. (1846); Aerides crispa Lindl. (1833); Aerides lindleyana Wight (1851); Aerides warneri Hook.f. (1890); Aerides crispa var. lindleyana (Wight) H.J. Veitch (1891); Aerides crispa var. warneri H.J. Veitch (1891)

= Aerides crispa =

Species of orchid

Aerides crispa is a species of epiphytic orchid native to western India and grows at an elevations of 800-1200.Inflorescens is a 40-50 cm long, erect to arching, branched, 20 to 25 flowered cluster, carrying fragrant flowers.
