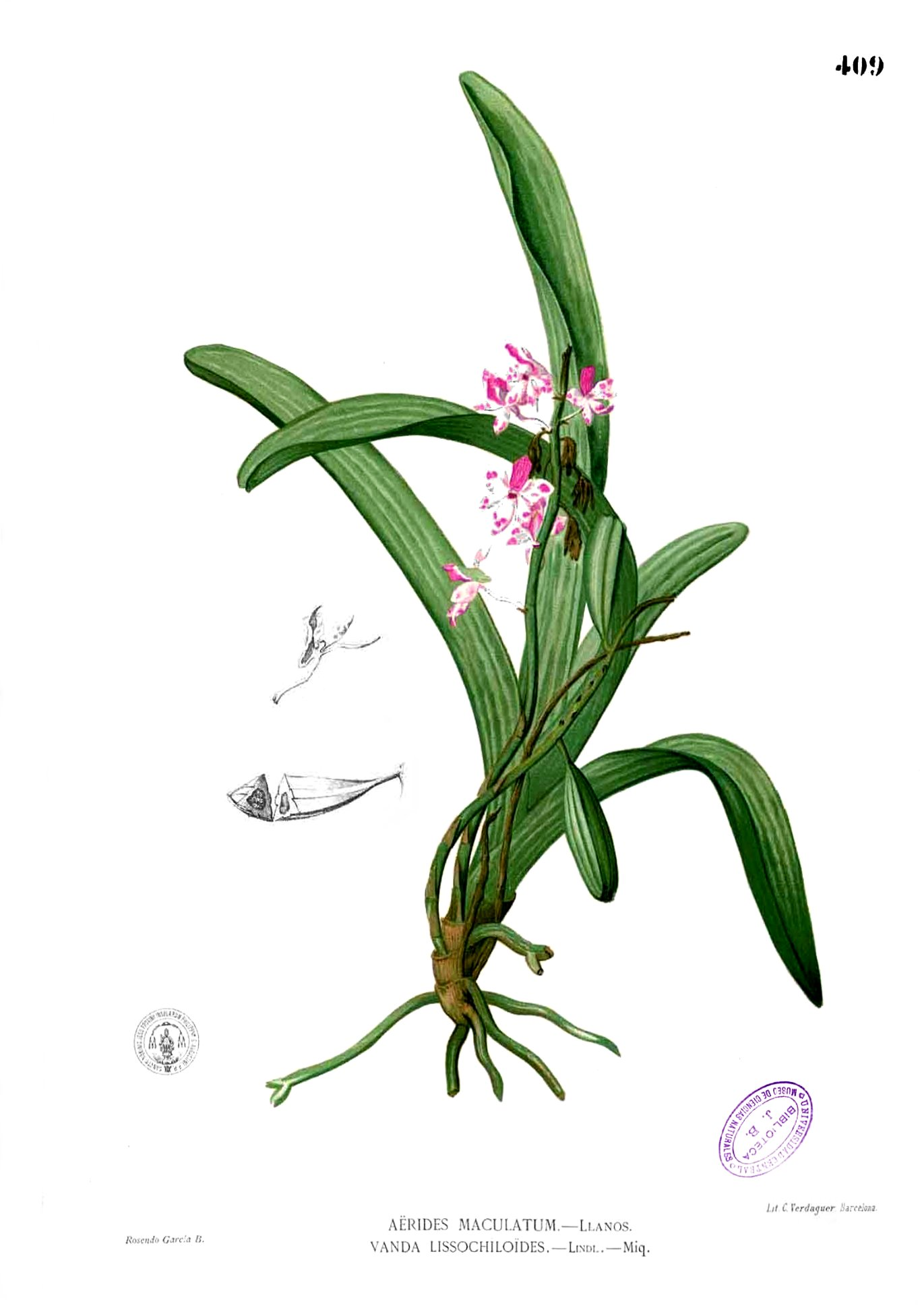
- illustration circa 1880

Scientific classification
- Kingdom: Plantae
- Clade: Tracheophytes
- Clade: Angiosperms
- Clade: Monocots
- Order: Asparagales
- Family: Orchidaceae
- Subfamily: Epidendroideae
- Genus: Aerides
- Species: A. quinquevulnera

Binomial name
- Aerides quinquevulnera Lindl. (1833)

Synonyms
- Aerides maculata Llanos (1851), illegitimate homonym, not Sm. 1818; Aerides fenzliana Rchb.f. (1860); Aerides farmeri Boxall ex Náves (1880); Aerides quinquevulnera var. purpurata Rchb.f. (1881); Aerides marginata Rchb.f. (1885); Aerides quinquevulnera var. farmeri (Boxall ex Náves) Stein (1892); Aerides quinquevulnera var. marginata (Rchb.f.) Stein (1892); Aerides quinquevulnera var. schadenbergiana Stein (1892); Aerides reversa J.J.Sm. (1912); Aerides quinquevulnera var. flava Valmayor & D. Tiu (1983); Aerides quinquevulnera var. punctata Valmayor & D. Tiu (1983)

= Aerides quinquevulnera =

Species of orchid

Aerides quinquevulnera is a species of orchid found in the Philippines and in New Guinea.
