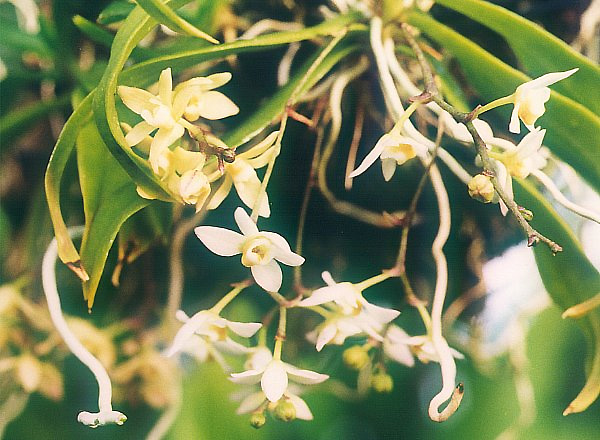
- Thrixspermum saruwatarii flowers

Scientific classification
- Kingdom: Plantae
- Clade: Tracheophytes
- Clade: Angiosperms
- Clade: Monocots
- Order: Asparagales
- Family: Orchidaceae
- Subfamily: Epidendroideae
- Genus: Thrixspermum
- Species: T. saruwatarii

Binomial name
- Thrixspermum saruwatarii (Hayata) Schltr.

Synonyms
- Sarcochilus saruwatarii Hayata (basionym)

= Thrixspermum saruwatarii =

Species of orchid

Thrixspermum saruwatarii is a species of orchid native central and southern Taiwan.
