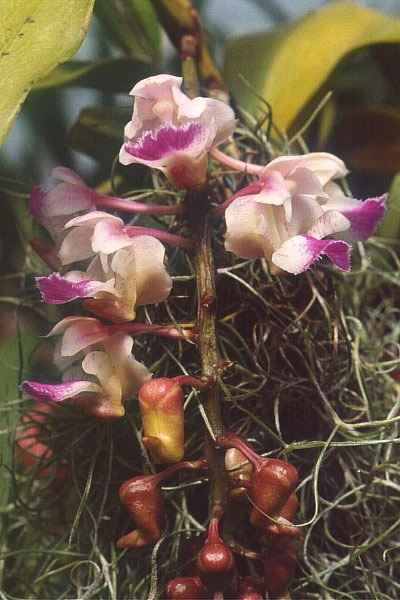
- Aerides falcata

Scientific classification
- Kingdom: Plantae
- Clade: Tracheophytes
- Clade: Angiosperms
- Clade: Monocots
- Order: Asparagales
- Family: Orchidaceae
- Subfamily: Epidendroideae
- Tribe: Vandeae
- Subtribe: Aeridinae
- Genus: Aerides; Lour., 1790

Type species
- Aerides odorata Lour.

Synonyms
- Aeridium Salisb.; Orxera Raf.

= Aerides =

Genus of orchids

Aerides, known commonly as cat's-tail orchids and fox brush orchids, is a genus belonging to the orchid family (Orchidaceae, subfamily Epidendroideae, tribe Vandeae, subtribe Aeridinae). It is a group of tropical epiphyte orchids that grow mainly in the warm lowlands of tropical Asia from India to southern China to New Guinea. They are valued in horticulture for their racemes of showy, fragrant, colorful flowers.

The name of the genus refers to the epiphytic growth habit of the species, and literally means "air-plant". The type species, Aerides odorata, was described by João de Loureiro in 1790. This genus is abbreviated Aer in the horticultural trade.

== Description ==
The species in this genus range from small to large monopodial epiphytes, except for Aerides krabiensis, which is a lithophyte. They form pendulous racemes with many long-lasting, fragrant, waxy flowers, which are often white with purple or pink edges. Some species have purple or pink flowers, and a few have yellow. Each flower has a forward-facing spur and grows on a sharp, stout, leafy stem. The leaves are distichous, growing in two vertical rows. The leaf margins are bilobed, and the apex is emarginate. There are ligules. Morphologically, they are very similar to species in the genus Vanda.

== Habitat ==
The genus grows in the tropics of Asia, in India, Nepal, southern China, Southeast Asia, the Philippines, and New Guinea. They flower from June to July. Temperature requirements vary from cool to warm growing depending on the species.

== Cultivation ==
Most Aerides species are considered easy to grow. Their flowers are fragrant and long-lived, which make them popular in horticulture as cut flowers and potted plants. Aerides can be kept in hanging baskets, teak containers or net pots, which allow the roots to extend into the air. They grow best in well-drained media, such as tree fern fibers, fir bark, and sphagnum moss. They require full sunlight, warm temperatures, and water applied to the roots. The plants do not tolerate disturbance or damage of their root systems in cultivation.

The plants do not have pseudobulbs. The leaves are leathery and drought-resistant. Many of these species have a monopodial vine-like growth habit, and the plants can quickly grow large.

== Species ==
The following species are recognized as of 2026, all monopodial epiphytic plants except the lithophyte A. krabiense.

- Aerides augustiana Rolfe
- Aerides cootesii Cabactulan, M.Leon & R.B.Pimentel
- Aerides crassifolia C.S.P.Parish ex Burb.
- Aerides crispa Lindl.
- Aerides emericii Rchb.f.
- Aerides falcata Lindl. & Paxton
- Aerides × formosa Gower
- Aerides houlletiana Rchb.f.
- Aerides huttonii (Hook.f.) J.H.Veitch
- Aerides inflexa Teijsm. & Binn.
- Aerides krabiensis Seidenf.
- Aerides lawrenceae Rchb.f.
- Aerides leeana Rchb.f.
- Aerides maculosa Lindl.
- Aerides magnifica Cootes & W.Suarez
- Aerides mcmorlandii B.S.Williams
- Aerides migueldavidii Cootes, Cabactulan & Naive
- Aerides multiflora Roxb.
- Aerides obyrneana Metusala
- Aerides odorata Lour.
- Aerides orthocentra Hand.-Mazz.
- Aerides phongthuyii Aver. & V.C.Nguyen
- Aerides quinquevulnera Lindl.
- Aerides ringens (Lindl.) C.E.C.Fisch.
- Aerides roebelenii Rchb.f.
- Aerides rosea Lodd. ex Lindl. & Paxton
- Aerides rubescens (Rolfe) Schltr.
- Aerides savageana A.H.Kent
- Aerides sookjae Vuong, V.C.Nguyen & Cootes
- Aerides sukauensis Shim
- Aerides thibautiana Rchb.f.
- Aerides timorana Miq.
- Aerides turma M.Leon, Cootes, Cabactulan & R.B.Pimentel
- Aerides upcmae Motes, M.Leon, Cootes & Cabactulan

== Hybrids ==
Natural hybrids include Aerides × jansonii, a cross between Aerides falcata and Aerides odorata.

Many hybrids have been made between Aerides and other orchids. The horticultural specimen × Christieara is a three-way hybrid between Aerides, Vanda, and Ascocentrum. Hybrids come in a wide range of colors due to the high degree of genetic diversity.
