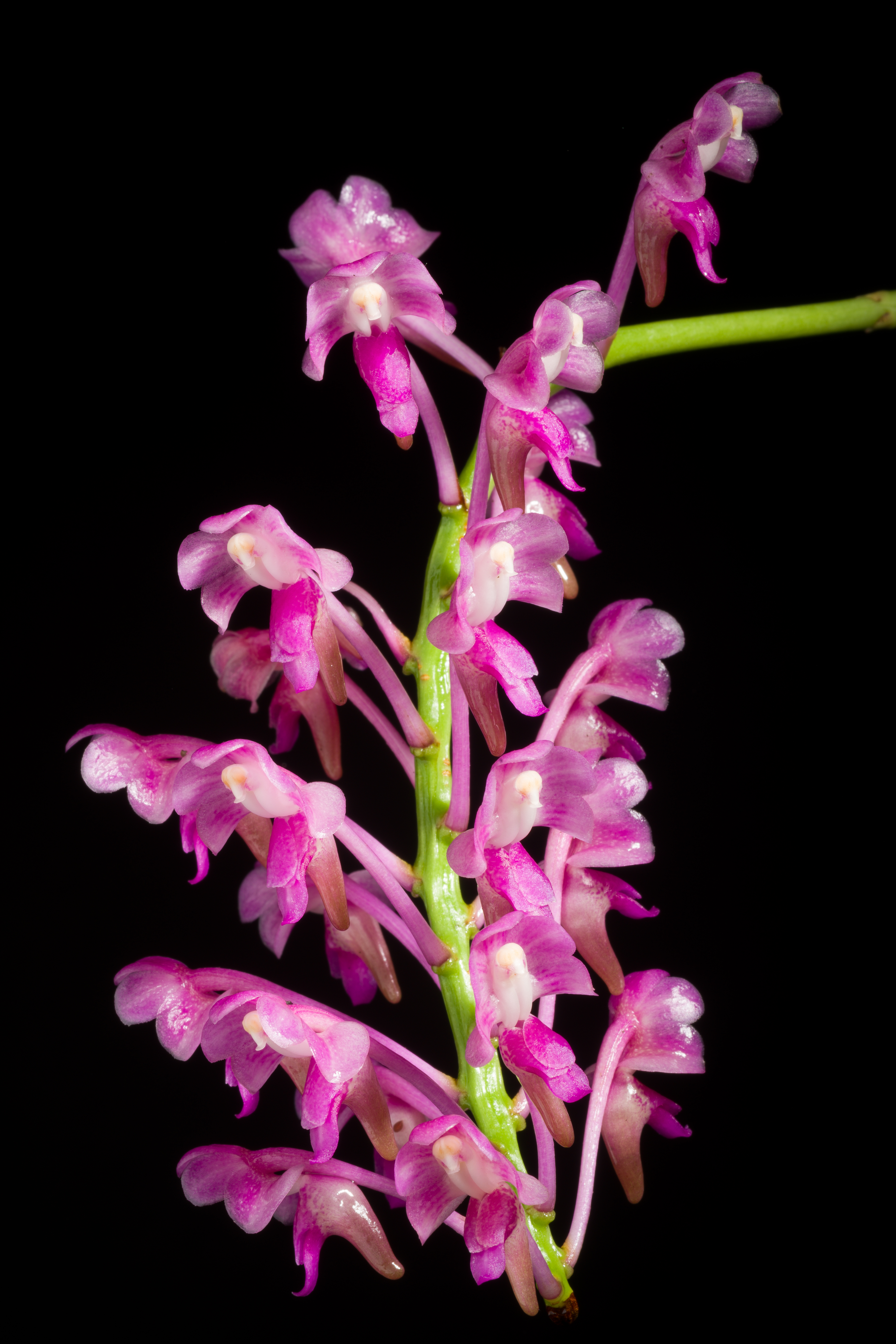

Conservation status
- Vulnerable (IUCN 3.1)

Scientific classification
- Kingdom: Plantae
- Clade: Tracheophytes
- Clade: Angiosperms
- Clade: Monocots
- Order: Asparagales
- Family: Orchidaceae
- Subfamily: Epidendroideae
- Genus: Aerides
- Species: A. leeana

Binomial name
- Aerides leeana Rchb.f.

Synonyms
- Aerides jarckiana Schltr.; Saccolabium semiclausum Kraenzl.; Aerides recurvipes J.J.Sm.; Aerides jarckiana var. smithii Ames & Quisumb.; Aerides jarckiana f. alba Valmayor & D.Tiu

= Aerides leeana =

Species of orchid

Aerides leeana is a species of plant in the family Orchidaceae. It is endemic to the Philippines. Its natural habitat is subtropical or tropical moist lowland forests. It is threatened by habitat loss.

Growing in brightly lit environments at low altitude, found in the provinces of Bataan, Camarines Norte, Camarines Sur, Cavite, Quezon and Rizal on the island of Luzon in the Philippines, Aerides leeana is erect 35 cm tall, and monopodial, it sometimes becomes pendulous.
