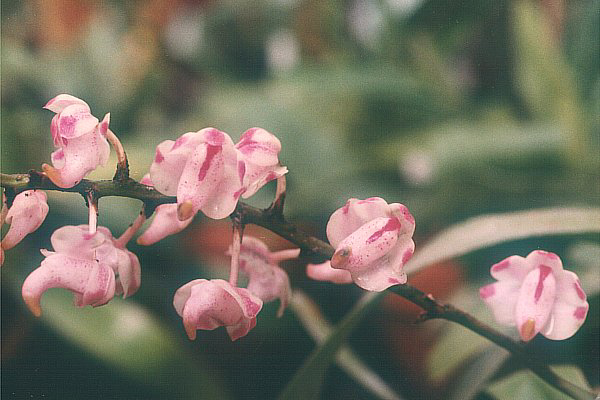

Conservation status
- Endangered (IUCN 3.1)

Scientific classification
- Kingdom: Plantae
- Clade: Tracheophytes
- Clade: Angiosperms
- Clade: Monocots
- Order: Asparagales
- Family: Orchidaceae
- Subfamily: Epidendroideae
- Genus: Aerides
- Species: A. odorata

Binomial name
- Aerides odorata Lour.

Synonyms
- Homotypic Synonyms: Aeridium odorum Salisb.; Epidendrum odoratum (Lour.) Poir.; Heterotypic Synonyms: Aerides ballantiniana Rchb.f.; Aerides cornuta Roxb.; Aerides dayana Guillaumin; Aerides flavida Lindl.; Aerides jucunda Rchb.f.; Aerides latifolia (Thunb. ex Sw.) Sw.; Aerides micholitzii Rolfe; Aerides nobilis B.S.Williams; Aerides odorata var. annamensis Costantin; Aerides odorata var. birmanica Rchb.f.; Aerides odorata var. demidovii Linden; Aerides odorata var. eburnea Cogn.; Aerides odorata f. immaculata (Guillaumin) M.Wolff & O.Gruss; Aerides odorata subvar. immaculata Guillaumin; Aerides odorata var. major Ortgies; Aerides odorata var. micholitzii (Rolfe) Guillaumin; Aerides odorata var. pallida Guillaumin; Aerides reichenbachii Linden; Aerides reichenbachii var. cochinchinensis Rchb.f.; Aerides rohaniana Rchb.f.; Aerides suaveolens Blume; Aerides suaveolens var. virens (Lindl.) Blume; Aerides suavissima Lindl.; Aerides suavissima var. ballantiniana (Rchb.f.) A.H.Kent; Aerides virens Lindl.; Aerides virens var. ellisii B.S.Williams; Aerides wilsoniana T.Moore & Mast.; Epidendrum aerides Raeusch.; Limodorum latifolium Thunb. ex Sw.; Orxera cornuta (Roxb.) Raf.; Polytoma odorifera Lour. ex B.A.Gomes

= Aerides odorata =

Species of orchid

Aerides odorata is a species of flowering plant in the Orchidaceae. It is widespread across much of Southeast Asia, found in the lowland forests of China (Yunnan, Guangdong), Himalayas, Bhutan, Assam, Bangladesh, India, Nepal, Andaman and Nicobar Islands, Myanmar, Thailand, Laos, Cambodia, Vietnam, Peninsular Malaysia, Borneo, Sumatra, Java, Sulawesi, the Lesser Sunda Islands, and the Philippines. Its natural habitat is subtropical or tropical moist lowland forest. It is threatened by habitat loss.
