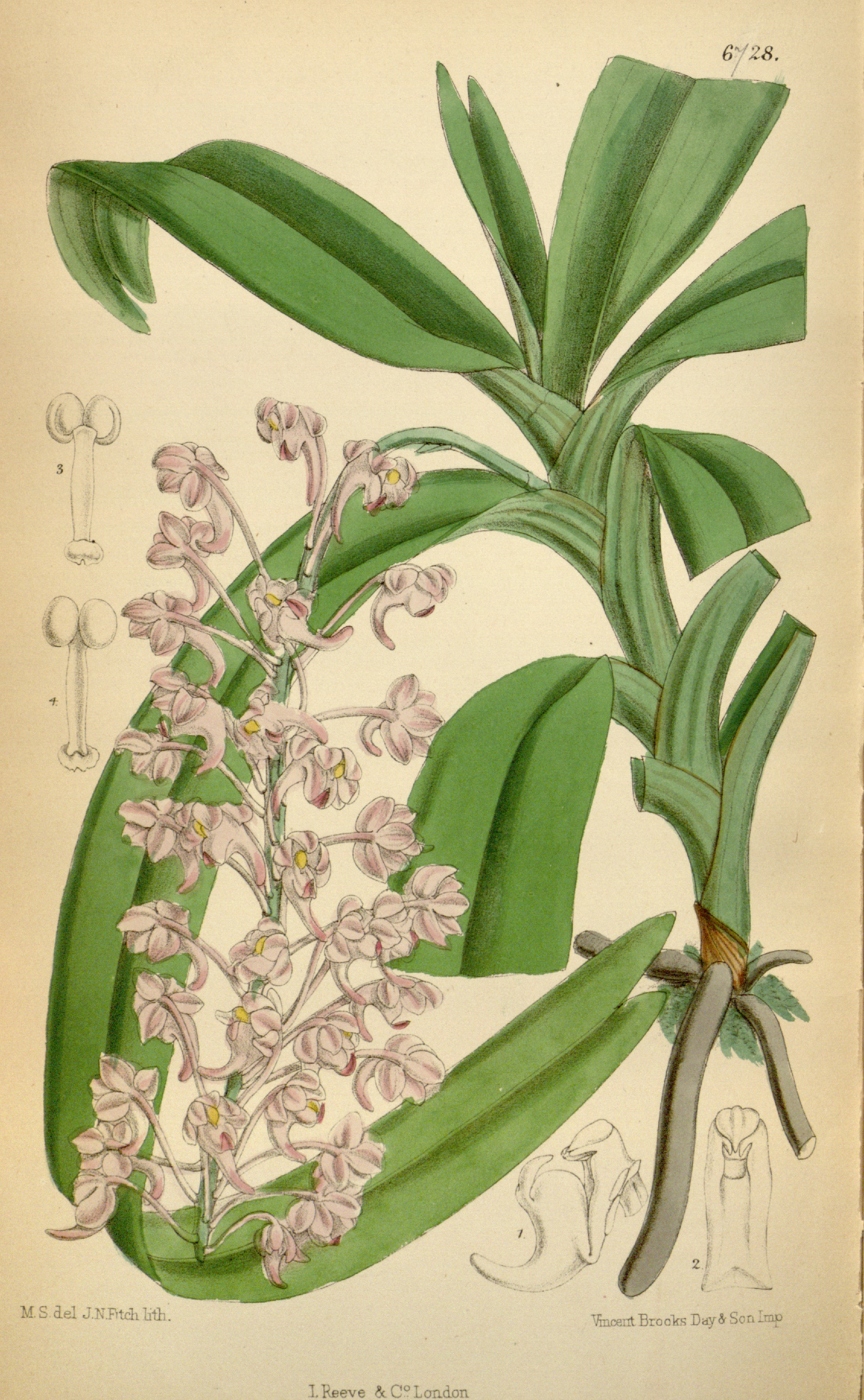
- from Curtis's Botanical Magazine, 1882

Scientific classification
- Kingdom: Plantae
- Clade: Tracheophytes
- Clade: Angiosperms
- Clade: Monocots
- Order: Asparagales
- Family: Orchidaceae
- Subfamily: Epidendroideae
- Genus: Aerides
- Species: A. emericii

Binomial name
- Aerides emericii Rchb.f. (1882)

= Aerides emericii =

Species of orchid

Aerides emericii is a species of epiphytic orchid. It is endemic to the Andaman and Nicobar Islands in the Bay of Bengal (politically part of India though closer to Myanmar, Thailand and Sumatra).
