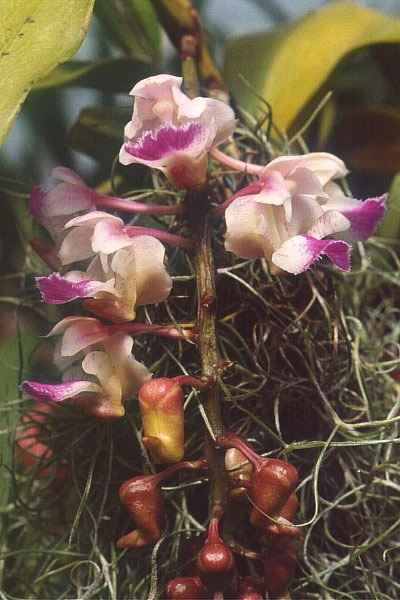

Scientific classification
- Kingdom: Plantae
- Clade: Tracheophytes
- Clade: Angiosperms
- Clade: Monocots
- Order: Asparagales
- Family: Orchidaceae
- Subfamily: Epidendroideae
- Genus: Aerides
- Species: A. falcata

Binomial name
- Aerides falcata Lindl. & Paxton (1851)

Synonyms
- Aerides larpentae Rchb.f. (1856); Aerides mendelii E. Morren (1876); Aerides expansa var. leoniae Rchb.f.; Aerides leoniae (Rchb.f.) Rchb.f.; Aerides falcata var. leoniae (Rchb.f.) A.H.Kent in H.J.Veitch; Aerides siamense Klinge (1898); Aerides falcata var. maurandii Guillaumin (1953)

= Aerides falcata =

Species of orchid

Aerides falcata is a species of epiphytic orchid native to Yunnan, Vietnam, Thailand, Laos, Cambodia, Myanmar.
