= Thrixspermum platystachys =

Starry hairseed

Scientific classification
- Kingdom: Plantae
- Clade: Tracheophytes
- Clade: Angiosperms
- Clade: Monocots
- Order: Asparagales
- Family: Orchidaceae
- Subfamily: Epidendroideae
- Genus: Thrixspermum
- Species: T. platystachys

Binomial name
- Thrixspermum platystachys (F.M.Bailey) Schltr.

Synonyms
- Sarcochilus platystachys F.M.Bailey; Sarcochilus platystachys F.Muell. nom. inval., nom. nud.; Thrixspermum neohibernicum Schltr.

Species of orchid

Thrixspermum platystachys, commonly known as the starry hairseed, is an epiphytic or lithophytic orchid that forms untidy clumps with many tangled, wiry roots, up to ten stiff, leathery leaves and many star-shaped, cream-coloured flowers with an orange and white labellum. This orchid occurs from Papuasia to northern Queensland.

== Description ==
Thrixspermum platystachys is an epiphytic or lithophytic herb that forms untidy, pendulous clumps with many thin wiry roots and flattened stems 100–250 millimetres (3.9–9.8 in) long. It has between five and ten stiff, leathery leaves 80–150 millimetres (3.1–5.9 in) long and 30–40 millimetres (1.2–1.6 in) wide in two ranks. The flowers are fragrant, star-shaped, cream-coloured, 30–40 millimetres (1.2–1.6 in) long and 40–60 millimetres (1.6–2.4 in) wide arranged on a flattened, wiry flowering stem 100–250 millimetres (3.9–9.8 in) long. The sepals are 30–35 millimetres (1.2–1.4 in) long and about 3 millimetres (0.12 in) wide, the petals shorter and narrower. The labellum is orange and white, about 15 millimetres (0.59 in) long and 9 millimetres (0.35 in) wide with three lobes. The side lobes are about erect, about 3 millimetres (0.12 in) long and 6 millimetres (0.24 in) wide and the middle lobe is short and fleshy with a spur about 4 millimetres (0.16 in) long. Flowering occurs sporadically.

== Taxonomy and naming ==
The starry hairseed was first formally described in 1886 by Frederick Bailey who gave it the name Sarcochilus platystachys and published the description in a supplement to A Synopsis of the Queensland Flora from a specimen collected by Thomas Bancroft near the Johnstone River. In 1911, Rudolf Schlechter changed the name to Thrixspermum platystachys. The specific epithet (platystachys) is derived from the ancient Greek words platys (πλατύς) meaning "broad" or "flat and stachys (στάχυς) meaning "ear of grain".

== Distribution and habitat ==
Thrixspermum platystachys grows on rainforest trees and on single trees near the coast in exposed situations. It occurs in New Guinea, the Solomon Islands, the Bismarck Archipelago and in Queensland on the Cape York Peninsula and as far south as Townsville.
