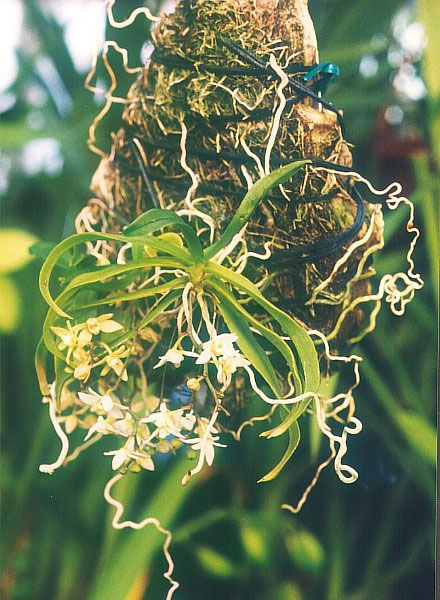
- Thrixspermum saruwatarii

Scientific classification
- Kingdom: Plantae
- Clade: Tracheophytes
- Clade: Angiosperms
- Clade: Monocots
- Order: Asparagales
- Family: Orchidaceae
- Subfamily: Epidendroideae
- Tribe: Vandeae
- Subtribe: Aeridinae
- Genus: Thrixspermum; Lour.

Type species
- Thrixspermum centipeda Lour.

Synonyms
- Dendrocolla Blume; Orsidice Rchb.f.; Cylindrochilus Thwaites; Ridleya (Hook.f.) Pfitzer; Cordiglottis J.J.Sm.; Cheirorchis Carr; Thylacis Gagnep.

= Thrixspermum =

Genus of orchids

Thrixspermum, commonly known as hairseeds or 白点兰属 (bai dian lan shu), is a genus of flowering plants in the family Orchidaceae. Orchids in this genus are epiphytes, lithophytes or terrestrial plants with flat, leathery leaves and short-lived flowers with the sepals and petals more or less similar to each other. The labellum is rigidly fixed to the column and has three lobes. The side lobes are erect and the middle lobe is thick and fleshy. There are about 190 species distributed from tropical and subtropical Asia to the Western Pacific. Most species grow in lowland or tropical rainforests up to an altitude of 1,200 m.

== Description ==
Orchids in the genus Thrixspermum are epiphytic or lithophytic, rarely terrestrial, monopodial herbs with long thick roots, and flat, fleshy leaves arranged in two ranks with their bases sheathing the stem. The flowers are arranged on a pendulous or arching flowering stem arising from a leaf axil. The flowers are usually short-lived and often open for less than a day. The sepals are free from and more or less similar to each other. The petals are free from each other and similar to, but slightly shorter than the sepals. The labellum is stiffly attached to the column with a pouched base and three lobes, the side lobes erect, usually short and blunt and the middle lobe thick and fleshy. The fruit is a long, thin capsule.

== Taxonomy and naming ==
The genus Thrixspermum was first formally described in 1790 by João de Loureiro in Flora Cochinchinensis. The name Thrixspermum is derived from the Ancient Greek words thrix (θρίξ), meaning "hair" and sperma (σπέρμα) meaning "seed".

== Species ==
The following is a list of species of Thrixspermum recognised by the Plants of the World Online as at January 2025:

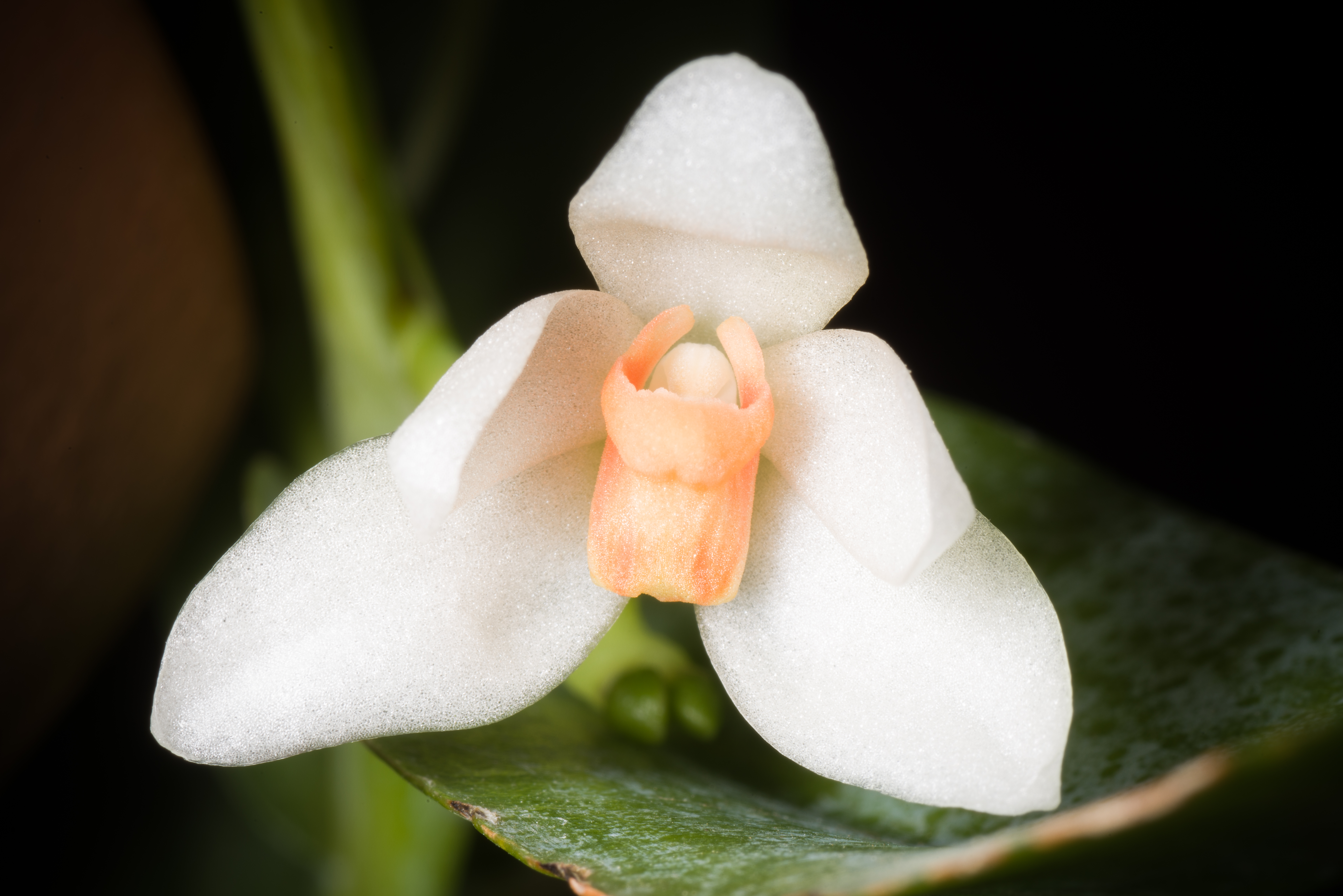
Thrixspermum pensile

- Thrixspermum aberrans Schltr.
- Thrixspermum acuminatissimum (Rchb. f.) Rchb.f.
  - Thrixspermum acuminatissimum subsp. acuminatissimum
  - Thrixspermum acuminatissimum subsp. affine (Schltr.) P.O'Byrne & Gokusing
- Thrixspermum acutilobum J.J.Sm.
- Thrixspermum agamense J.J.Sm.
- Thrixspermum agusanense Ames
- Thrixspermum alabense J.J.Wood
- Thrixspermum alboluteum Toolmal, Schuit. & Culham
- Thrixspermum amesianum L.O.Williams
- Thrixspermum amplexicaule (Blume) Rchb.f.
- Thrixspermum anceps (Blume) Rchb.f.
- Thrixspermum ancoriferum (Guillaumin) Garay
- Thrixspermum angustatum L.O.Williams
- Thrixspermum angustifolium (Blume) Rchb.f.
- Thrixspermum anjunganense P.O'Byrne
- Thrixspermum annamense (Guillaum.) Garay
- Thrixspermum arachnitiforme Schltr.
- Thrixspermum aurantiacum J.J.Sm.
- Thrixspermum bellamabantae Cabactulan, Cootes & R.B.Pimentel
- Thrixspermum benedictii P.O'Byrne
- Thrixspermum bicolor P.O'Byrne, P.T.Ong & J.J.Verm.
- Thrixspermum borneense (Rolfe) Ridl.
- Thrixspermum bosuangii P.O'Byrne & Gokusing
- Thrixspermum brevibracteatum J.J.Sm.
- Thrixspermum brevicapsularis Holttum
- Thrixspermum brevicaule Carr
- Thrixspermum brevipes Schltr.
- Thrixspermum breviscapum (Carr) Kocyan & Schuit.
- Thrixspermum bromeliforme W.Suarez
- Thrixspermum brunnescens (Ridl.) J.J.Sm.
- Thrixspermum calceolus (Lindl.) Rchb.f.
- Thrixspermum canaliculatum J.J.Sm.
- Thrixspermum carinatifolium (Ridl.) Schltr.
- Thrixspermum carnosum (K.Schum.) Schltr.
- Thrixspermum caudatum P.O'Byrne & Gokusing
- Thrixspermum celebicum Schltr.
- Thrixspermum centipeda Lour
- Thrixspermum cerinum (Ridl.) J.J.Sm.
- Thrixspermum changlangensis K.Gogoi
- Thrixspermum chanianum P.O'Byrne & Gokusing
- Thrixspermum clavatum (J.Koenig) Garay
- Thrixspermum clavilobum J.J.Sm.
- Thrixspermum complanatum (J.Koenig) Schltr.
- Thrixspermum congestum (Bailey) Dockrill
- Thrixspermum conigerum J.J.Sm.
- Thrixspermum cootesii W.Suarez
- Thrixspermum cordulatum J.J.Sm.
- Thrixspermum corneri Holttum
- Thrixspermum crassifolium Ridl.
- Thrixspermum crassilabre (King & Pantl.) Ormerod
- Thrixspermum crescentiforme Ames & C.Schweinf.
- Thrixspermum cryptophallon P.O'Byrne & J.J.Verm.
- Thrixspermum cymboglossum Schltr.
- Thrixspermum denticulatum Schltr.
- Thrixspermum doctersii J.J.Sm.
- Thrixspermum duplocallosum Holttum
- Thrixspermum elmeri L.O.Williams
- Thrixspermum elongatum Ames
- Thrixspermum erythrolomum P.O'Byrne & J.J.Verm.
- Thrixspermum eximium L.O.Williams
- Thrixspermum fantasticum L.O.Williams
- Thrixspermum fernandeziae Cootes, Cabactulan & M.Leon
- Thrixspermum filifolium Schltr.
- Thrixspermum filiforme (Hook.f.) Kuntze
- Thrixspermum fimbriatum (Ridl.) J.J.Wood
- Thrixspermum flaccidum J.J.Sm.
- Thrixspermum flammeum Toolmal, Schuit. & Culham
- Thrixspermum fleuryi (Gagnep.) Tang & F.T.Wang
- Thrixspermum formosanum (Hayata) Schltr.
- Thrixspermum fragrans Ridl.
- Thrixspermum fulgens (Ridl.) Schltr.
- Thrixspermum fuscum (Ridl.) Merr.
- Thrixspermum gombakense J.J.Sm.
- Thrixspermum gracilicaule Schltr.
- Thrixspermum graeffei Rchb.f.
- Thrixspermum grandiflorum P.O'Byrne & J.J.Verm.
- Thrixspermum hiepii Aver. & Averyanova
- Thrixspermum hystrix (Blume) Rchb.f.
- Thrixspermum incurvicalcar J.J.Sm.
- Thrixspermum indicum Vik.Kumar, D.Verma & A.N.Rao
- Thrixspermum indragiriense Schltr.
- Thrixspermum inquinatum J.J.Sm.
- Thrixspermum integrum L.O.Williams
- Thrixspermum iodochilus Ridl.
- Thrixspermum japonicum (Miq.) Rchb.f.
- Thrixspermum javanicum J.J.Sm.
- Thrixspermum kipandicum P.O'Byrne & Gokusing
- Thrixspermum kjellbergii J.J.Sm.
- Thrixspermum kocyanii J.J.Wood & A.L.Lamb
- Thrixspermum lampongense J.J.Sm.
- Thrixspermum lanatum P.O'Byrne & Gokusing
- Thrixspermum latifolium J.J.Sm.
- Thrixspermum latisaccatum J.J.Sm.
- Thrixspermum lengguanianum P.T.Ong & P.O'Byrne
- Thrixspermum leucorachne Ridl.
- Thrixspermum ligulatum L.O.Williams
- Thrixspermum linearifolium Ames
- Thrixspermum lingiae P.O'Byrne & Gokusing
- Thrixspermum linusii J.J.Wood & A.L.Lamb
- Thrixspermum lombokense J.J.Sm.
- Thrixspermum longicauda Ridl.
- Thrixspermum longilobum J.J.Sm.
- Thrixspermum longipedicellatum (Joongku Lee, T.B.Tran & R.K.Choudhary) Kocyan & Schuit.
- Thrixspermum longipilosum J.J.Sm.
- Thrixspermum loogemanianum Schltr.
- Thrixspermum lucidum Schltr.
- Thrixspermum luciferum P.O'Byrne & J.J.Verm.
- Thrixspermum maculatum Schltr.
- Thrixspermum majus (Carr) Kocyan & Schuit.
- Thrixspermum malayanum J.J.Sm.
- Thrixspermum megacarpum P.O'Byrne, A.L.Lamb & P.T.Ong
- Thrixspermum merapohense P.O'Byrne & P.T.Ong
- Thrixspermum mergitiferum P.O'Byrne & J.J.Verm.
- Thrixspermum merguense (Hook.f .) Kuntze
- Thrixspermum milneri P.O'Byrne & Gokusing)
- Thrixspermum montanum Ridl.
- Thrixspermum multicolor (Ridl.) Merr.
- Thrixspermum neohibernicum Schltr.
- Thrixspermum nicolasiorum Calaramo, Cootes & Naive
- Thrixspermum obtusum (Blume) Rchb.f.)
- Thrixspermum obyrneanum Toolmal, P.T.Ong & Schuit.
- Thrixspermum ochraceum P.O'Byrne, P.T.Ong & J.J.Verm.
- Thrixspermum odoratum X.Q.Song, Q.W.Meng & Y.B.Luo
- Thrixspermum olidum P.O'Byrne
- Thrixspermum oreadum Schltr.
- Thrixspermum pachychilum P.O'Byrne & Gokusing
- Thrixspermum pardale (Ridl.) Schltr.
- Thrixspermum patens J.J.Sm.
- Thrixspermum patkeiense K.Gogoi
- Thrixspermum pauciflorum (Hook.f.) Kuntze
- Thrixspermum pellicerae Cootes, Cabactulan, R.B.Pimentel & M.Leon
- Thrixspermum pensile Schltr.
- Thrixspermum pinocchio P.O'Byrne & J.J.Verm.
- Thrixspermum platycaule Holttum
- Thrixspermum platystachys (F.M. Bailey) Schltr.
- Thrixspermum poilanei (Gagnep.) Tang & F.T.Wang
- Thrixspermum polystictum Toolmal, Schuit., & Suddee
- Thrixspermum ponapense Tuyama
- Thrixspermum praetermissum Toolmal, Schuit., & Suddee
- Thrixspermum psiloglottis (Ridl.) Schltr.
- Thrixspermum pugionifolium (Hook.f.) Schltr.
- Thrixspermum pulchellum (Thwaites) Schltr.
- Thrixspermum pulchrum Carr
- Thrixspermum pulverulentum (Carr) Kocyan & Schuit.
- Thrixspermum punctatum (Ridl.) J.J.Sm.
- Thrixspermum purpurascens Rchb. f.
- Thrixspermum pusillum (Guillaumin) Garay
- Thrixspermum pygmaeum (King & Pantl.) Holttum
- Thrixspermum quinquelobum Ames
- Thrixspermum raciborskii J.J.Sm
  - Thrixspermum raciborskii subsp. brevipollinium P.O'Byrne & Ent
  - Thrixspermum raciborskii subsp. raciborskii
- Thrixspermum recurvum (Hook.f.) Kuntze
- Thrixspermum remotiflorum J.J.Sm.
- Thrixspermum rimauense J.J.Wood & A.L.Lamb
- Thrixspermum rimiae P.O'Byrne & Ent
- Thrixspermum robinsonii Ames
- Thrixspermum roseum J.J.Sm.
- Thrixspermum rostratum Ames
- Thrixspermum rubrocalcaratum P.O'Byrne & Gokusing
- Thrixspermum saccatum P.O'Byrne & J.J.Verm.
- Thrixspermum sagoense J.J.Sm.
- Thrixspermum samarindae Schltr.
- Thrixspermum sarawakense Ames
- Thrixspermum sarcophyllum Garay
- Thrixspermum saruwatarii (Hayata) Schltr.
- Thrixspermum scandens P.O'Byrne
- Thrixspermum scopa (Rchb.f. ex Hook.f.) Holttum
- Thrixspermum scortechinii (Hook.f.) Kuntze
- Thrixspermum semiteretifolium J.J.Wood & A.L.Lamb
- Thrixspermum simile Tollmal, Schuit. & Utteridge
- Thrixspermum simum J.J.Sm.
- Thrixspermum squarrosum J.J.Sm.
- Thrixspermum stelidioides Aver. & Averyanova
- Thrixspermum subteres J.J.Sm.
- Thrixspermum subulatum (Blume) Rchb.f.
- Thrixspermum sumatranum J.J.Sm.
- Thrixspermum sutepense (Rolfe ex Downie) Tang & F.T.Wang
- Thrixspermum taeniophyllum Jun Y.Zhang, H.He & Yue H.Cheng
- Thrixspermum tahanense Carr
- Thrixspermum taianum P.O'Byrne & P.T.Ong
- Thrixspermum tenuicalcar Carr
- Thrixspermum teretifolium P.O'Byrne & J.J.Verm.
- Thrixspermum torajaense P.O'Byrne
- Thrixspermum tortum J.J.Sm.
- Thrixspermum triangulare Ames & C.Schweinf.
- Thrixspermum trichoglottis (Hook.f.)Kuntze
- Thrixspermum tsii W.H.Chen & Y.M.Shui
- Thrixspermum tubulatum P.O'Byrne
- Thrixspermum tylophorum Schltr.
- Thrixspermum validum J.J.Sm.
- Thrixspermum vanoverberghii Ames
- Thrixspermum ventricosum J.J.Wood & A.L.Lamb
- Thrixspermum walkeri Seidenf. & P.Ormerod
- Thrixspermum warianum Schltr.
- Thrixspermum weberi Ames
- Thrixspermum wenzelii Ames
- Thrixspermum westenenkii (J.J.Sm.) Kocyan & Schuit.
- Thrixspermum williamsianum (Kores) Ormerod
- Thrixspermum xantholeucum Schltr.
- Thrixspermum xantholomum P.O'Byrne & J.J.Verm.

== Distribution ==
Orchids in the genus Thrixspermum are found in China, Japan (including the Ryukyu Islands), Korea, Taiwan, India (including the Andaman and Nicobar Islands), Bangladesh, Nepal, Sri Lanka, Cambodia, Laos, Myanmar, Thailand, Vietnam, Borneo, Indonesia, Malaysia, the Philippines, New Guinea, the Solomon Islands, northern Australia (including Christmas Island), Fiji, New Caledonia, Samoa, Vanuatu and the Caroline Islands. About fourteen species, two of which are endemic occur in China, nine are found in Taiwan and three in Australia.
