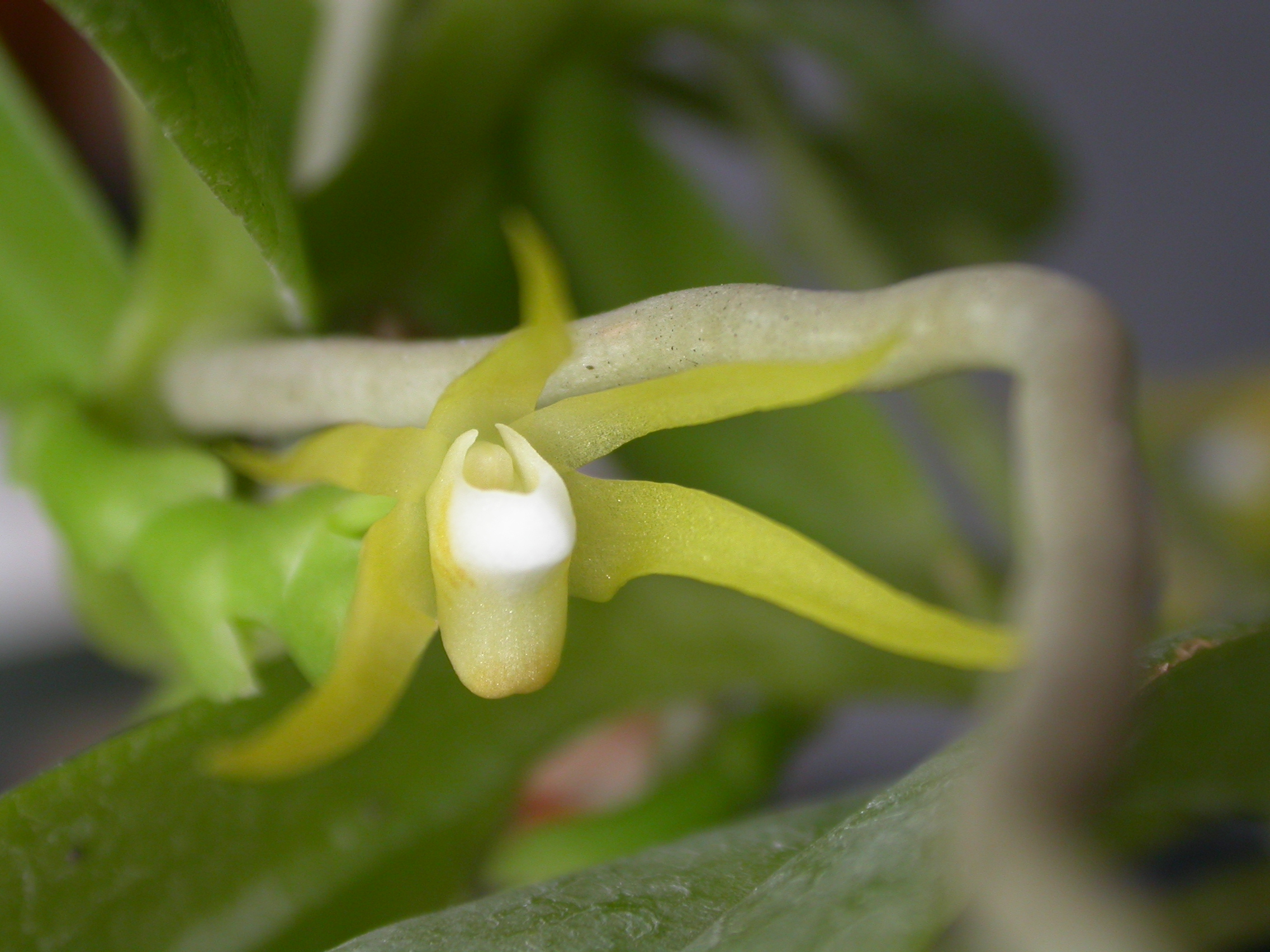
- Thrixspermum centipeda

Scientific classification
- Kingdom: Plantae
- Clade: Tracheophytes
- Clade: Angiosperms
- Clade: Monocots
- Order: Asparagales
- Family: Orchidaceae
- Subfamily: Epidendroideae
- Genus: Thrixspermum
- Species: T. centipeda

Binomial name
- Thrixspermum centipeda Lour.

Synonyms
- Homotypic Synonyms: Epidendrum thrixspermum Raeusch.; Sarcochilus centipeda (Lour.) Náves; Heterotypic Synonyms: Aerides arachnites (Blume) Lindl.; Aerides flos-aeris Sw.; Dendrobium auriferum Lindl.; Dendrocolla arachnites Blume; Sarcochilus arachnites (Blume) Rchb.f.; Sarcochilus aurifer (Lindl.) Rchb.f.; Sarcochilus hainanensis Rolfe; Thrixspermum arachnites (Blume) Rchb.f.; Thrixspermum auriferum (Lindl.) Rchb.f.; Thrixspermum hainanense (Rolfe) Schltr.; Thrixspermum papillosum Carr; Vanda pauciflora Breda

= Thrixspermum centipeda =

Species of orchid

Thrixspermum centipeda is a species of flowering plant in the family Orchidaceae. This orchid is sometimes referred to by the common name centipede thrixspermum. It is native to Assam, Bangladesh, Borneo, Cambodia, South-Central and Southeast China, East Himalaya, Hainan, Java, Laos, the Lesser Sunda Islands, Malaysia, Myanmar, the Philippines, Sulawesi, Sumatra, Thailand, Vietnam.
