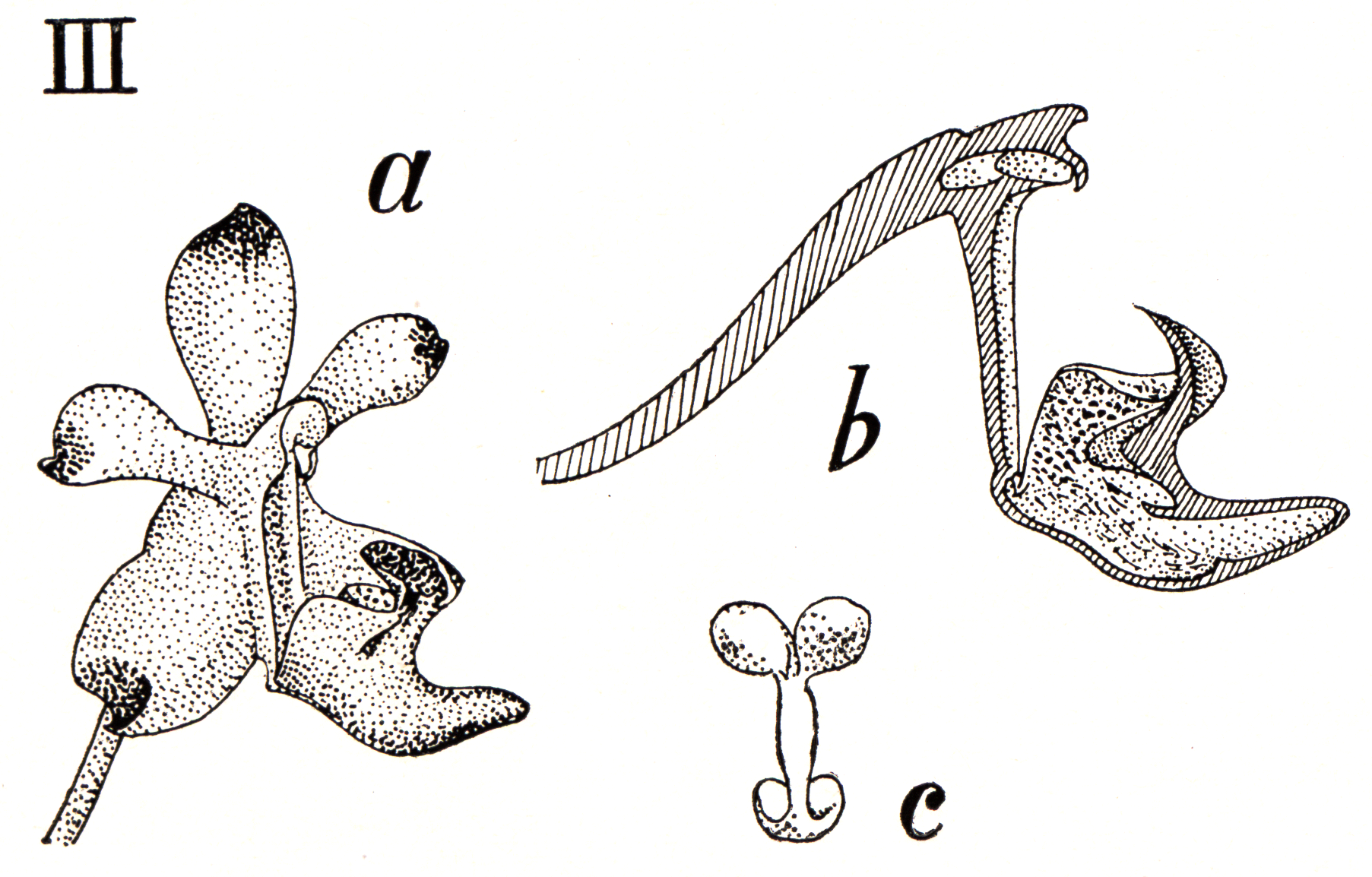
- Aerides inflexa

Scientific classification
- Kingdom: Plantae
- Clade: Tracheophytes
- Clade: Angiosperms
- Clade: Monocots
- Order: Asparagales
- Family: Orchidaceae
- Subfamily: Epidendroideae
- Genus: Aerides
- Species: A. inflexa

Binomial name
- Aerides inflexa Teijsm. & Binn.

= Aerides inflexa =

Species of orchid

Aerides inflexa is a species of orchid in the genus Aerides that was first described in 1862. It is native to Borneo and Sulawesi.
