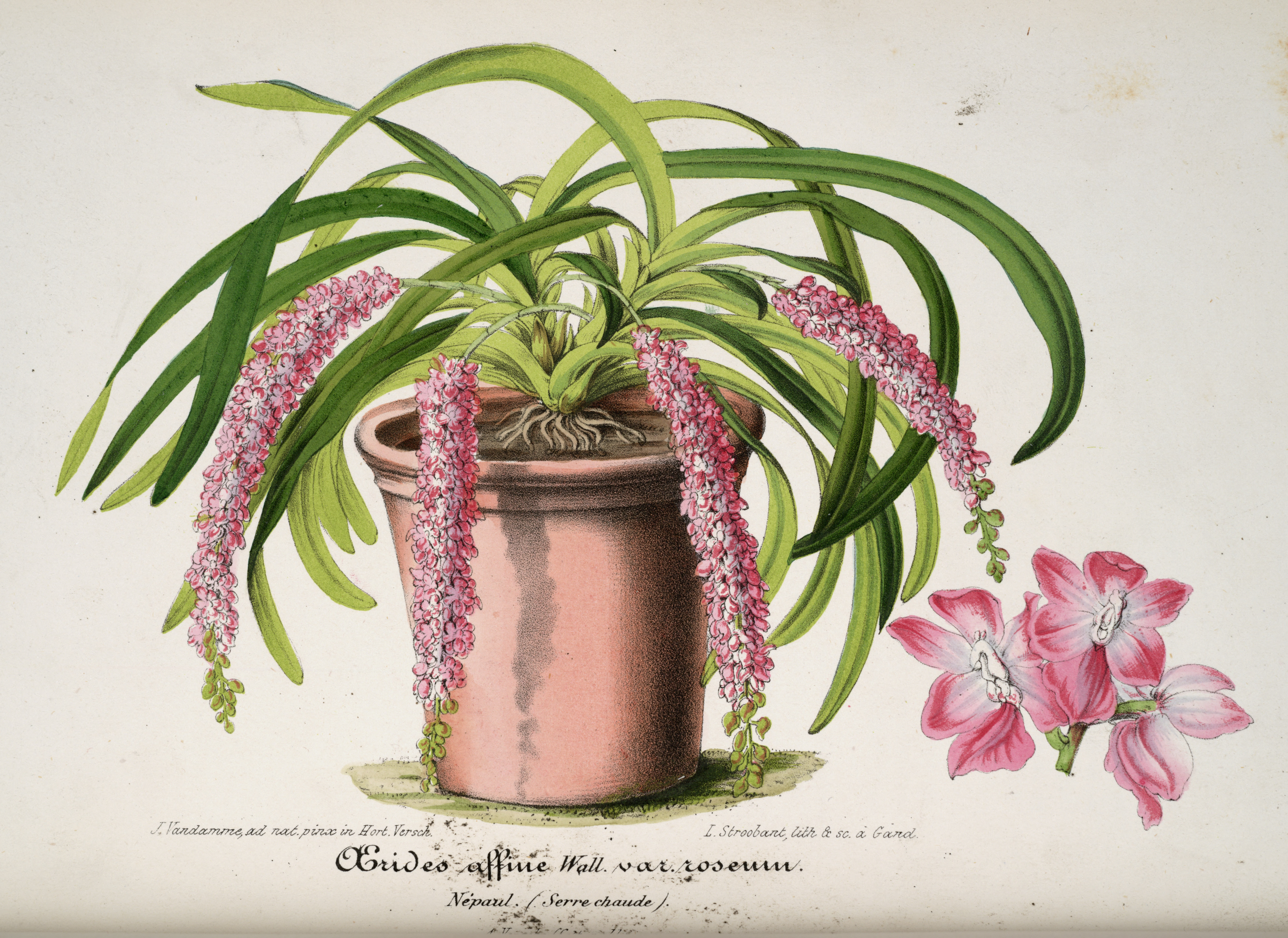
- From "L'Illustration horticole" 1856

Scientific classification
- Kingdom: Plantae
- Clade: Tracheophytes
- Clade: Angiosperms
- Clade: Monocots
- Order: Asparagales
- Family: Orchidaceae
- Subfamily: Epidendroideae
- Genus: Aerides
- Species: A. rosea

Binomial name
- Aerides rosea Lodd. ex Lindl. & Paxton (1850)

Synonyms
- Aerides affinis var. rosea (Lodd. ex Lindl. & Paxton) C.S.P.Parish (1883); Aerides trigona Klotzsch (1855); Aerides williamsii R. Warner (1865); Aerides fieldingii Lodd. ex E. Morren (1876); Aerides fieldingii var. williamsii (R. Warner) H.J. Veitch (1891); Aerides fieldingii var. alba L. Linden (1897); Aerides rosea f. alba (L. Linden) Christenson (1994)

= Aerides rosea =

Species of orchid

Aerides rosea is a species of epiphytic orchid. It is native to China (Guangxi, Guizhou, Yunnan), Assam, Bhutan, Cambodia, India, Laos, Myanmar, Thailand and Vietnam.
