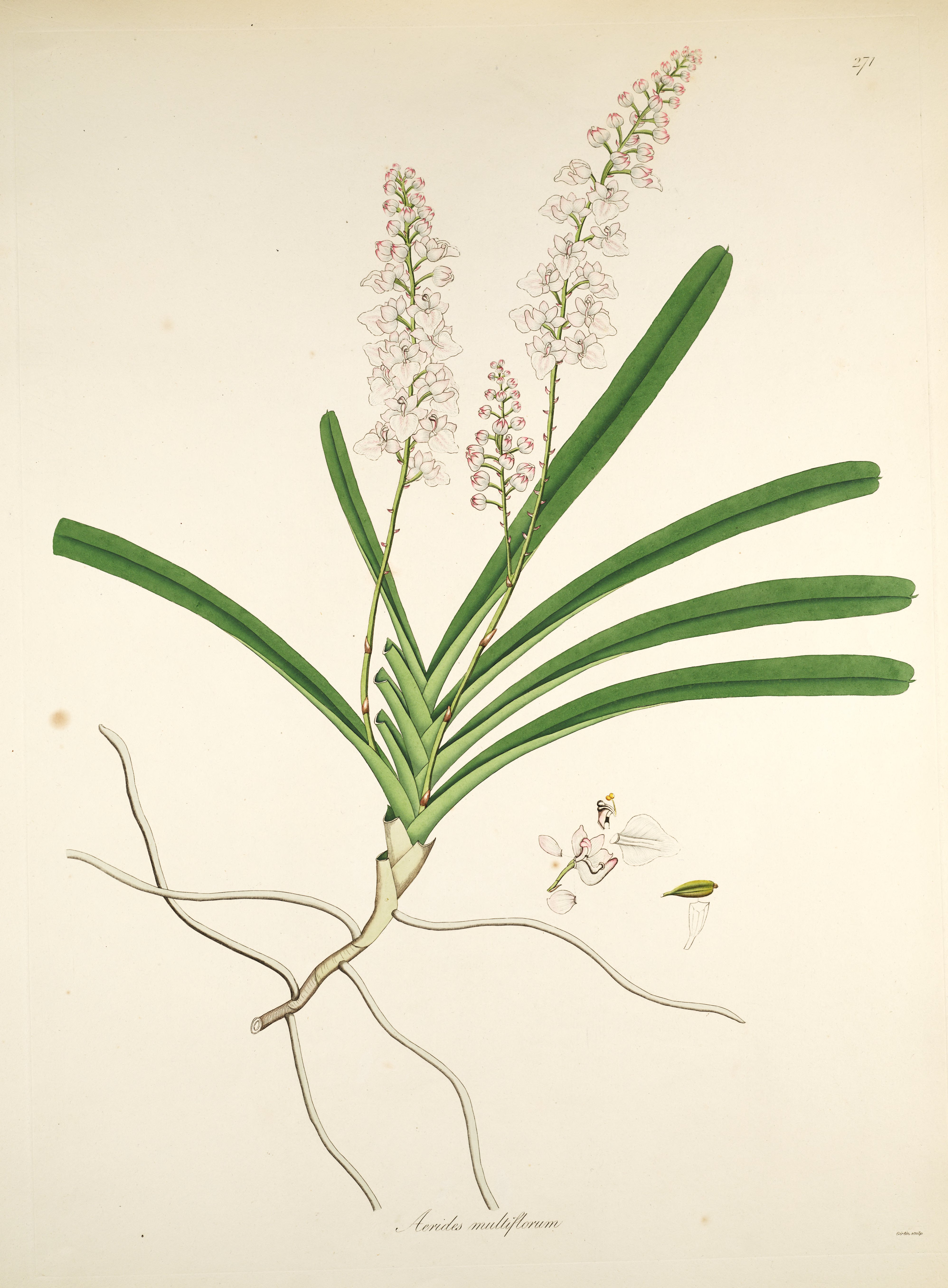

Scientific classification
- Kingdom: Plantae
- Clade: Tracheophytes
- Clade: Angiosperms
- Clade: Monocots
- Order: Asparagales
- Family: Orchidaceae
- Subfamily: Epidendroideae
- Genus: Aerides
- Species: A. multiflora

Binomial name
- Aerides multiflora Roxb. (1820)

Synonyms
- Aerides affinis Wall. ex J. Lindl. (1833); Aerides lobbii Lem. (1868); Aerides veitchii E. Morren (1876); Aerides godefroyana Rchb.f. (1886); Aerides multiflora var. godefroyana (Rchb.f.) H.J. Veitch (1887); Epidendrum geniculatum Hook.f. (1890); Aerides multiflora var. lobbii H.J. Veitch (1891); Aerides multiflora var. veitchii (E. Morren) H.J. Veitch (1891); Cleisostoma vacherotiana Guillaumin (1948); Aerides multiflora var. dactyloides M. Ahmed & al. (1989)

= Aerides multiflora =

Species of orchid

Aerides multiflora, the multi-flowered aerides, is a species of orchid included in the subfamily Epidendroideae, native to Southeast Asia, the Coromandel Coast, and Bangladesh.

== Distribution and habitat ==
It is found in Assam, Bangladesh, India, Nepal, the east and west Himalayas, the Andaman Islands, Burma, Thailand, Laos, Cambodia, and Vietnam in the dry tropical regions of the lowlands and the subtropical forests at altitudes from sea level to 1100 meters above sea level.

== Description ==
It is a small to medium-sized plant that prefers a hot climate to cool climates and flourishes in May, June or July. It is an epiphyte with a great aroma that has a stem with many curved ligulate leaves with a bi-lobed apex in a hanging influorescence 30 cm long with up to 50 waxy fragrant flowers about 1.85 to 2.5 cm wide.

== Cultivation ==
The plants are best grown in hanging baskets. They must have full sun and cool to warm temperatures. If they are hanging, their roots must be watered frequently. The plants need to be cultivated in well-drained medias, such as tree fern fiber (for small plants), several pieces of thick fir bark, or tree moss.

== Synonymy and confusion ==
In 1820, William Roxburgh published a description of Aerides multiflora. In 1882, João Barbosa Rodrigues published a description of a very different plant under the name of Epidendrum geniculatum. Eight years later, in 1890, Joseph Dalton Hooker published a description of an orchid now recognized as Aerides multiflora Roxb. and named it Epidendrum geniculatum. Thus, Epidendrum geniculatum Barb.Rodr. is a very different taxon from Epidendrum geniculatum Hook.f., a synonym for Aerides multiflora Roxb., the subject of this article.

== Taxonomy ==
Aerides multiflorum was described by William Roxburgh and published in Plants of the Coast of Coromandel 3: 68. 1820.

Etymology

Aerides (abbreviated Aer.): genus name that comes from the Greek words: "aer" = "air" y "eides" = "resembling", alluding to the habit of epiphytes like these plants that apparently feed off nothing, only what the atmosphere can offer them.

multiflorum: Latin epithet that means "with many flowers".

Synonymy

- Aerides affine Wall. 1833
- Aerides affinis Wall. ex Lindl. (1833)
- Aerides lobbii Lem. (1868)
- Aerides trigonum Klotsch 1855
- Aerides veitchi R.H.Torr. ex E.Morren 1876
- Aerides veitchii E. Morren (1876)
- Aerides godefroyana Rchb.f. (1886)
- Aerides godefroyanum Rchb.f 1886
- Aerides multiflora var. godefroyana (Rchb.f.) H.J.Veitch (1887)
- Epidendrum geniculatum Hook.f. (1890)
- Aerides multiflora Roxb. (1820)
- Aerides multiflora var. lobbii H.J. Veitch (1891)
- Aerides multiflora var. veitchii (E. Morren) H.J. Veitch (1891)
- Cleisostoma vacherotiana Guillaumin (1948)
- Aerides multiflora var. dactyloides M.Ahmed & al. (1989)
