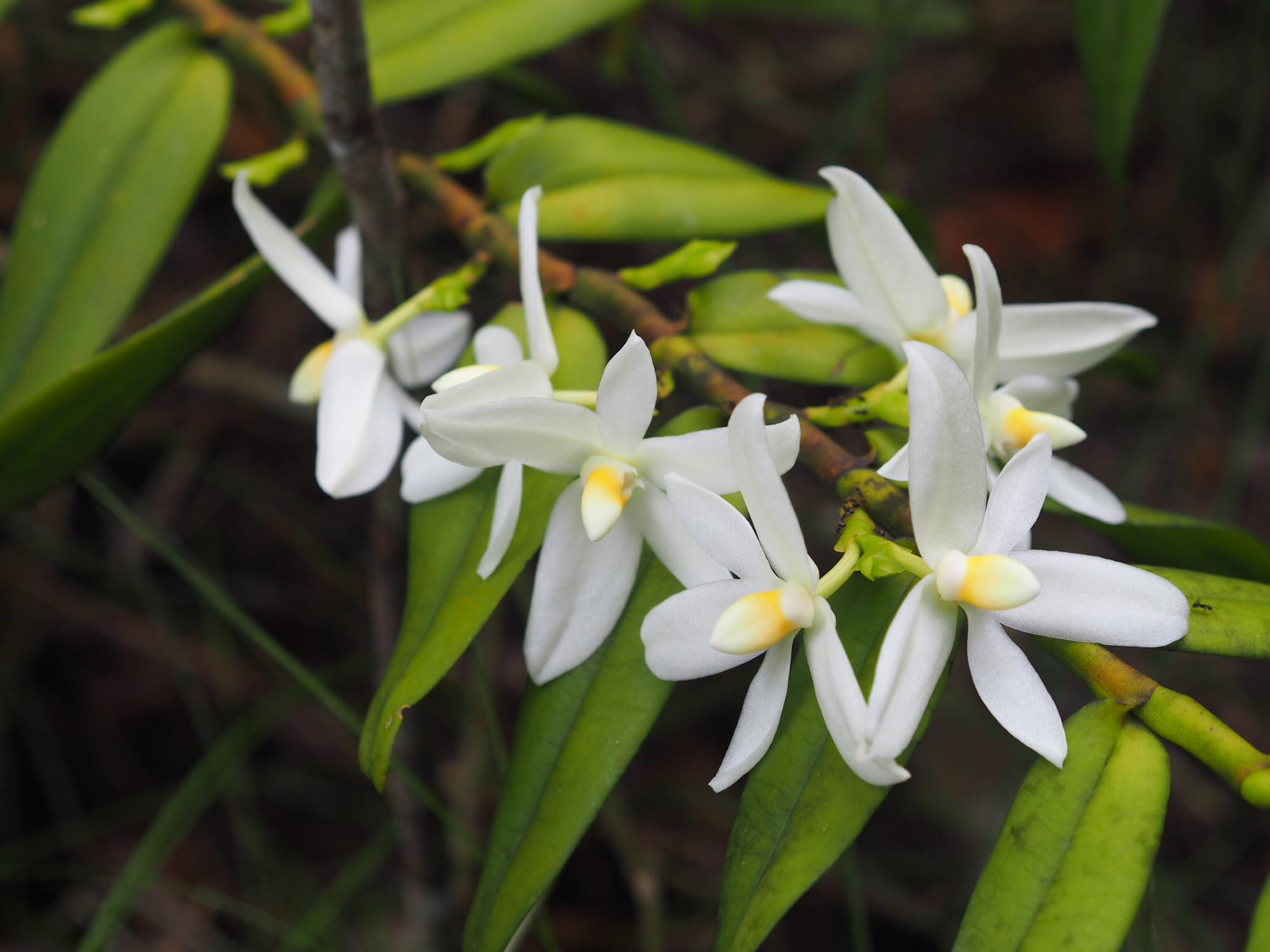
- Thrixspermum calceolus from Pha Ngan Island, Thailand

Scientific classification
- Kingdom: Plantae
- Clade: Tracheophytes
- Clade: Angiosperms
- Clade: Monocots
- Order: Asparagales
- Family: Orchidaceae
- Subfamily: Epidendroideae
- Genus: Thrixspermum
- Species: T. calceolus

Binomial name
- Thrixspermum calceolus (Lindl.) Rchb.f.

Synonyms
- Sarcochilus calceolus Lindl. (basionym); Aerides lobbii Teijsm. & Binn; Sarcochilus brachystachys Hook.f.; Thrixspermum brachystachyum (Hook.f.) Kuntze

= Thrixspermum calceolus =

Small shoe-carrying thrixspermum

Species of orchid

Thrixspermum calceolus, commonly called the small shoe-carrying thrixspermum, is a species of orchid native to Thailand, Vietnam, Borneo, Malaysia and Sumatra. They can be found as epiphytes or lithophytes in lower evergreen and semideciduous montane forests. The orchids are climbing or creeping with their roots found along the length stems. White flowers with fragrant can be found in summer. There are often 2 to 3 flowers per node.

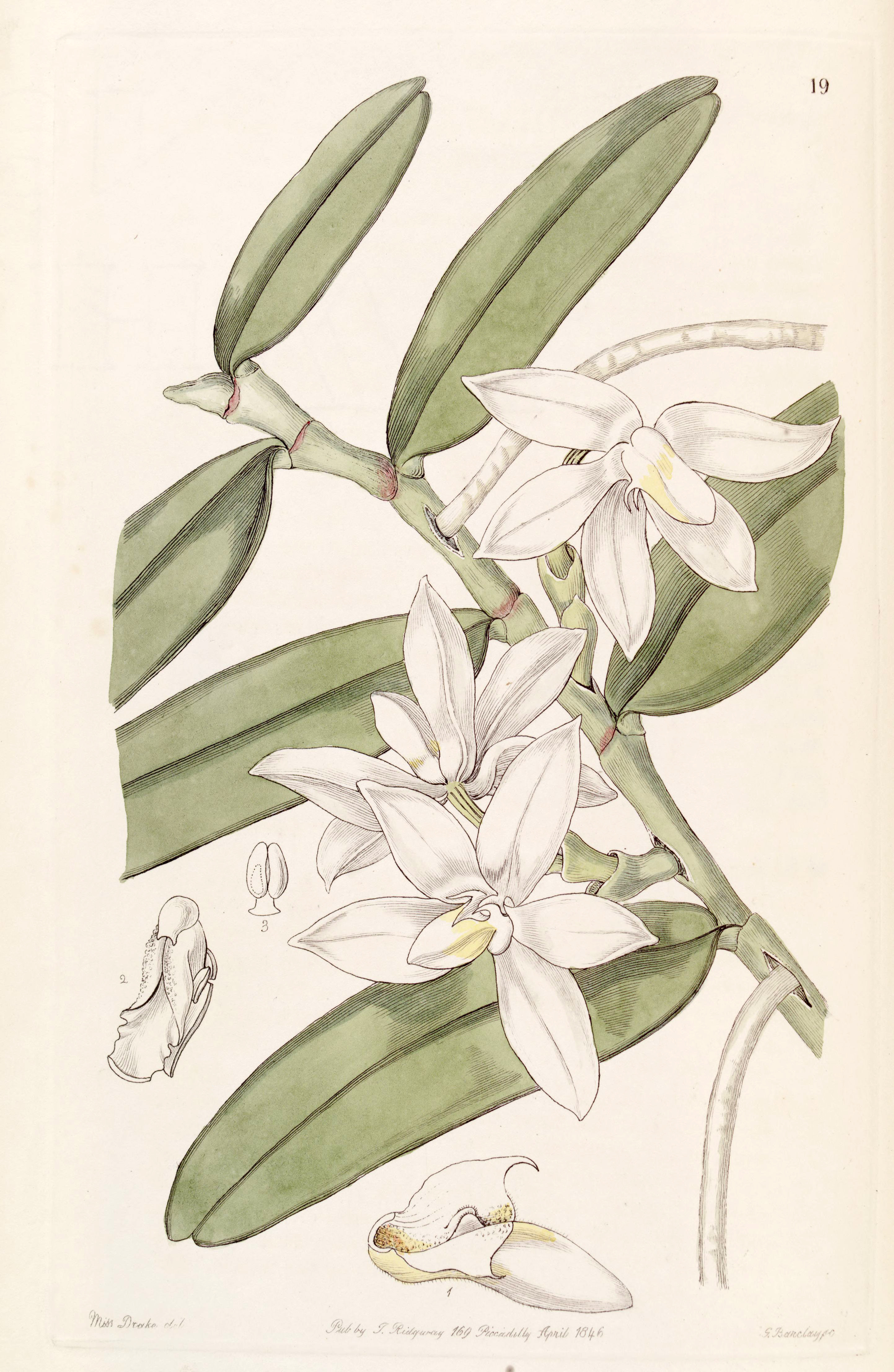
1846 illustration
