= Omoro =

Omoro may refer to:

- Omoro Botanical Garden in Okinawa, Japan
- Omoro District in the Northern Region of Uganda
- Omoro Lake in Bolivia
- Omoro-machi, a neighborhood of Naha, Okinawa, Japan
- Omoro Sōshi, a compilation of ancient poems and songs from Okinawa and the Amami Islands
