= Omoro Botanical Garden =

Arboretum and botanical garden in Motobu, Okinawa, Japan

Coordinates: 26°41′27.8″N 127°52′39.1″E

The Omoro Botanical Garden (おもろ植物園, Omoro Shokubutsuen; 4 hectares), also known as the Omoro Arboretum, is an arboretum and botanical garden located in the Ocean Expo Park, 424 Ishikawa, Motobu, Okinawa, Japan. It is open daily except Thursdays; admission is free.

== History ==
This facility was opened in 1980 to commemorate the Okinawa International Ocean Exposition. At a 2003 press conference, Emperor Akihito suggested the garden serve as a parallel to Japan's Manyo botanical gardens, which feature plants appearing in the Man'yōshū anthology (much like a Shakespeare garden in the English-speaking world). Accordingly, this garden collects plants that are described in the Omoro Sōshi (おもろそうし), a collection of Okinawan poems and songs.

== Collection ==
The garden contains about 400 species of salt-resistant plants organized into zones, including large trees (Ficus microcarpa, Ficus superba, Ficus virgata, Bischofia javanica, etc.), small trees (Maytenus diversifolia, Scaevola taccada, Wikstroemia retusa), shade trees (Artocarpus altilis, Ficus lyrata, Koelreuteria elegans subsp. formosana), and other plants including Antidesma pentandrum, Buxus liukiuensis (Makino), Clerodendrum inerme, and Murraya paniculata, as well as various garden plants, herbs, and so forth.

The garden also contains more than 110 wild orchid species, many of them endangered, native to the Ryukyu Islands. These include Acanthephippium pictum, Acanthephippium sylhetense, Bulbophyllum macraei, Dendrobium okinawense, Eria ovata, Eulophia graminea, Gastrochilus japonicus, Gerdorum densiflorum, Malaxis kandae, Neofinetia falcata, Sedirea japonica, and Tainia laxiflora.

== See also ==
- List of botanical gardens in Japan
