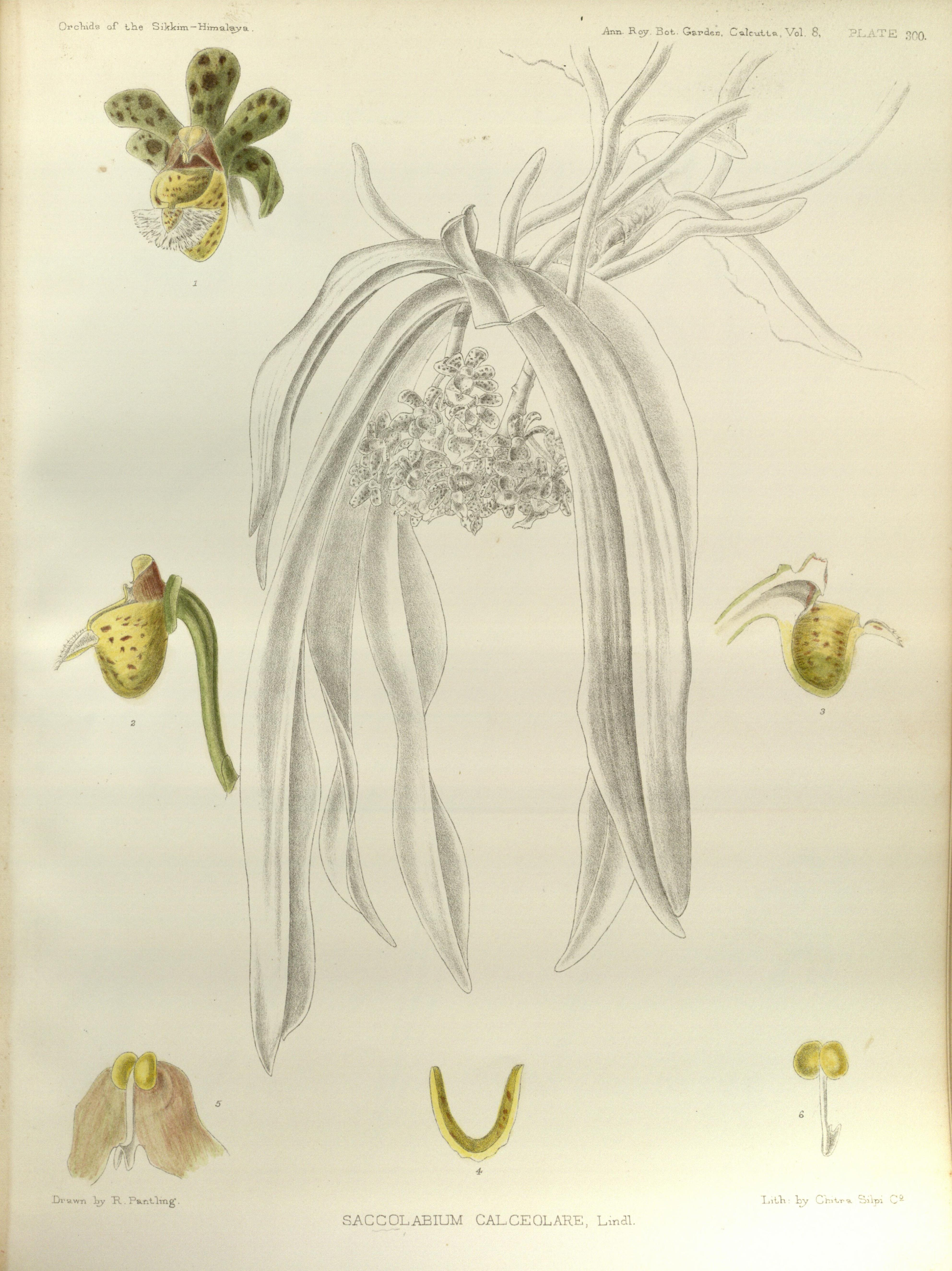

Conservation status
- Critically Endangered (IUCN 3.1)

Scientific classification
- Kingdom: Plantae
- Clade: Tracheophytes
- Clade: Angiosperms
- Clade: Monocots
- Order: Asparagales
- Family: Orchidaceae
- Subfamily: Epidendroideae
- Genus: Gastrochilus
- Species: G. calceolaris

Binomial name
- Gastrochilus calceolaris (Buch.-Ham ex J.E.Sm.) D.Don

Synonyms
- Aerides calceolaris Buch.-Ham. ex Sm. in A.Rees; Epidendrum calceolare (Buch.-Ham. ex Sm.) D.Don; Saccolabium calceolare (Buch.-Ham. ex Sm.) Lindl.; Aerides leopardorum Wall. ex Hook.f.; Gastrochilus philippinensis Ames; Gastrochilus calceolaris var. biflora L.R.Shakya & M.R.Shrestha

= Gastrochilus calceolaris =

Species of orchid

Gastrochilus calceolaris is a species in the family Orchidaceae. It is widespread across much of Southeast Asia, including southern China (Hainan, Tibet, Yunnan), Bhutan, Assam, Malaysia, Myanmar, Nepal, Thailand, Vietnam, Java, Sumatra, the Philippines, and the Andaman & Nicobar Islands.

Within the Philippines, in it is found in only one location, in Benguet. So it is considered endangered within the country.

Its natural habitat is subtropical or tropical moist lowland forests. It is threatened by habitat loss.

== See also ==
- List of threatened species of the Philippines
