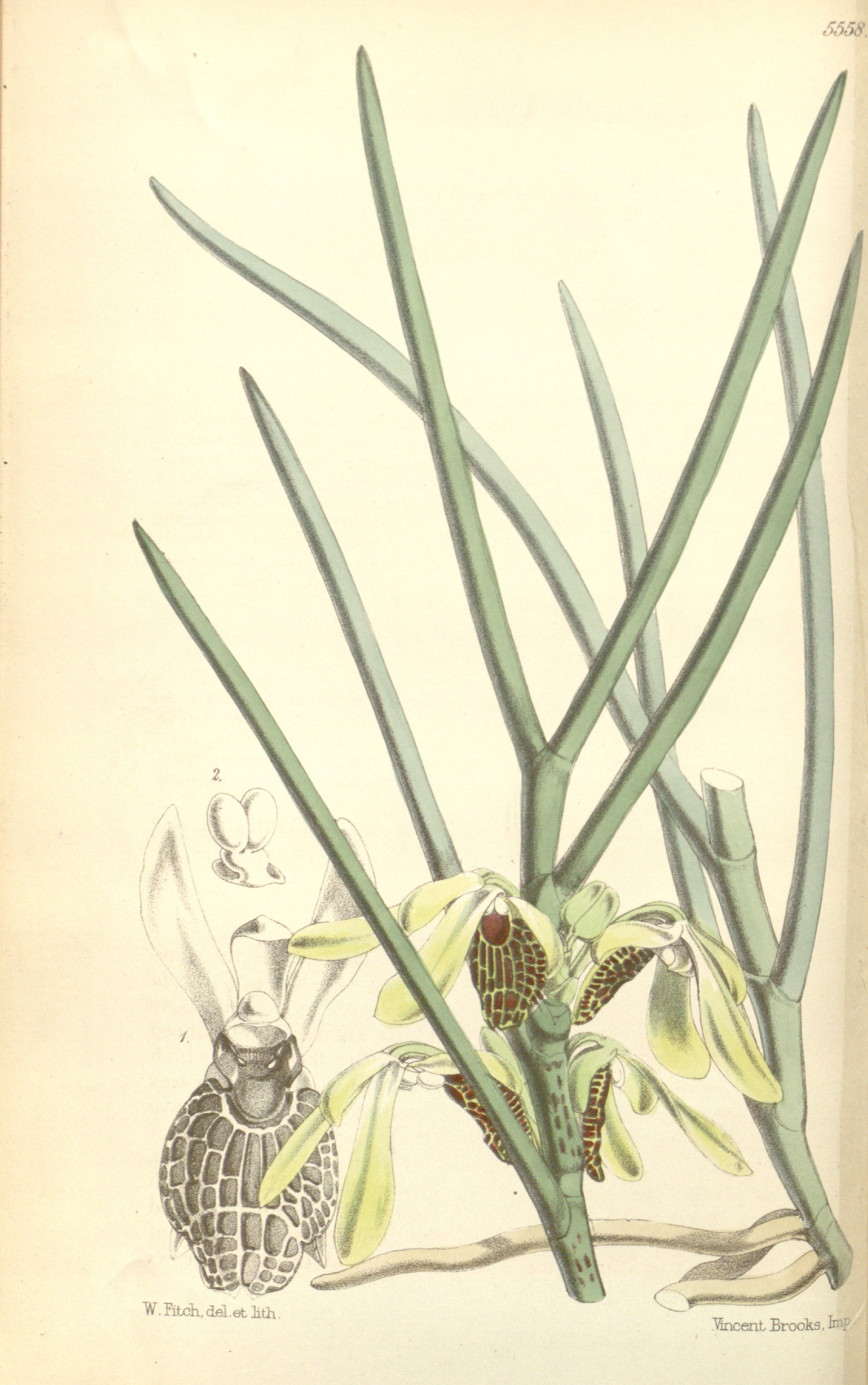
- Illustration of Luisia psyche from Curtis's Botanical Magazine

Scientific classification
- Kingdom: Plantae
- Clade: Tracheophytes
- Clade: Angiosperms
- Clade: Monocots
- Order: Asparagales
- Family: Orchidaceae
- Subfamily: Epidendroideae
- Tribe: Vandeae
- Subtribe: Aeridinae
- Genus: Luisia; Gaudich.

Type species
- Luisia teretifolia Gaudich.

Synonyms
- Birchea A.Rich.; Lockia Aver.; Mesoclastes Lindl.; Trichorhiza Lindl. ex Steud.

= Luisia =

Genus of orchids

Luisia, commonly known as velvet orchids or 钗子股属 (chai zi gu shu), is a genus of epiphytic or lithophytic orchids in family Orchidaceae. Plants in this genus have flattened roots, long leafy stems, narrow, thick, leathery leaves and short-lived flowers that open sporadically. There are about 54 species found from tropical and subtropical Asia to the Western Pacific.

== Description ==
Orchids in the genus Luisia are epiphytic or lithophytic, monopodial herbs with long, fibrous stems and thick, more or less flattened roots. A large number of cylinder-shaped, narrow leathery leaves are arranged along the stems. Up to ten resupinate, usually small, fleshy flowers are arranged on a short, thickened flowering stem and open sporadically. Each flower has a short, curved stalk and petals that are longer than the sepals. The labellum is large and fleshy with an upper epichile separated by a groove from the lower concave hypochile. The labellum has a rigid connection to the column.

== Taxonomy and naming ==
The genus Luisia was first formally described in 1829 by Charles Gaudichaud-Beaupré and the description was published in Voyage autour du monde fait par ordre du Roi sur les corvettes de S. M. l'Uranie et la Physicienne. The name Luisia honours Don Luis de Torres who assisted the French expedition at Guam.

== Distribution ==
Orchids in the genus Luisia occur in Bhutan, China, India, Indochina, Indonesia, Japan, Malaysia, New Guinea the Philippines, Sri Lanka, Thailand, Australia, Micronesia and Melanesia.

== Species list ==
The following is a list of species of Luisia accepted by the Plants of the World Online as at October 2025:

- Luisia abrahami Vatsala in A.Abraham & P.Vatsala, 1981
- Luisia amesiana Rolfe, 1893
- Luisia antennifera Blume, 1849
- Luisia appressifolia Aver., 2000
- Luisia balakrishnanii S.Misra 2010
- Luisia birchea Blume
- Luisia brachyota H.H.Fu, Liang Ma & S.P.Chen
- Luisia brachystachys (Lindl.) Blume, 1849
- Luisia cantharis Rolfe, 1895
- Luisia celebica Schltr., 1911
- Luisia confusa Rchb.f. in W.G.Walpers, 1863
- Luisia cordata Fukuy.
- Luisia cordatilabia Ames & Quisumb. (1933, publ. 1934)
- Luisia curtisii Seidenf., 1997
- Luisia diglipurensis Sanjay Mishra & Jalal
- Luisia filiformis Hook.f., 1890
- Luisia foxworthii Ames, 1908
- Luisia hancockii Rolfe, 1896
- Luisia hoanii Duy, T.V.Tran & V.H.Quach
- Luisia inconspicua (Hook.f.) King & Pantl.
- Luisia jarawana Sanjay Mishra & Jalal
- Luisia javanica J.J.Sm., 1914
- Luisia jonesii J.J.Sm., 1914
- Luisia longispica Z.H.Tsi & S.C.Chen, 1994
- Luisia lui T.C.Hsu & S.W.Chung 2010
- Luisia macrantha Blatt. & McCann, 1932
- Luisia macrotis Rchb.f., 1869
- Luisia magniflora Z.H.Tsi & S.C.Chen, 1994
- Luisia megamalaiana Karupp. & V.Ravich.
- Luisia megasepala Hayata, 1914
- Luisia microptera Rchb.f., 1870
- Luisia morsei Rolfe, 1903
- Luisia occidentalis Lindl. 1853
- Luisia parviflora Aver. 2015
- Luisia platyglossa Rchb.f.
- Luisia primulina C.S.P.Parish & Rchb.f., 1874
- Luisia psyche Rchb.f., 1863
- Luisia ramosii Ames, 1911
- Luisia recurva Seidenf., 1971
- Luisia secunda Seidenf., 1971
- Luisia simaoensis D.P.Ye & H.Jiang
- Luisia sonii (Aver.) Kumar & S.W.Gale
- Luisia taurina J.J.Sm., 1910
- Luisia teres (Thunb.) Blume
- Luisia teretifolia Gaudich.
- Luisia thailandica Seidenf., 1971
- Luisia trichorhiza (Hook.) Blume, 1849
- Luisia tristis (G.Forst.) Hook.f., 1890
- Luisia unguiculata J.J.Sm., 1926
- Luisia verrucosa Kurzweil, Nob.Tanaka & Ormerod
- Luisia volucris Lindl., 1853
- Luisia yunnanensis Jie Huang & D.H.Peng
- Luisia zeylanica Lindl. 1853
- Luisia zollingeri Rchb.f. in W.G.Walpers, 1863

== Intergeneric hybrids ==
- x Aeridisia (Aerides x Luisia)
- x Aeridovanisia (Aerides x Luisia x Vanda)
- x Ascogastisia (Ascocentrum x Gastrochilus x Luisia)
- x Debruyneara (Ascocentrum x Luisia x Vanda)
- x Dominyara (Ascocentrum x Luisia x Neofinetia x Rhynchostylis )
- x Gastisia (Gastrochilus x Luisia)
- x Gastisocalpa (Gastrochilus x Luisia x Pomatocalpa)
- x Goffara (Luisia x Rhynchostylis x Vanda)
- x Luascotia (Ascocentrum x Luisia x Neofinetia)
- x Luicentrum (Ascocentrum x Luisia)
- x Luichilus (Luisia x Sarcochilus)
- x Luinetia (Luisia x Neofinetia)
- x Luinopsis (Luisia x Phalaenopsis)
- x Luisanda (Luisia x Vanda)
- x Luistylis (Luisia x Rhynchostylis )
- x Luivanetia (Luisia x Neofinetia x Vanda)
- x Pageara (Ascocentrum x Luisia x Rhynchostylis x Vanda)
- x Papilisia (Papilionanthe x Luisia) One species of Papilionanthe was re-classified as a hybrid with this genus (× Papilisia taiwaniana)
- x Pomatisia (Luisia x Pomatocalpa)
- x Scottara (Aerides x Arachnis x Luisia)
- x Trautara (Doritis x Luisia x Phalaenopsis)
