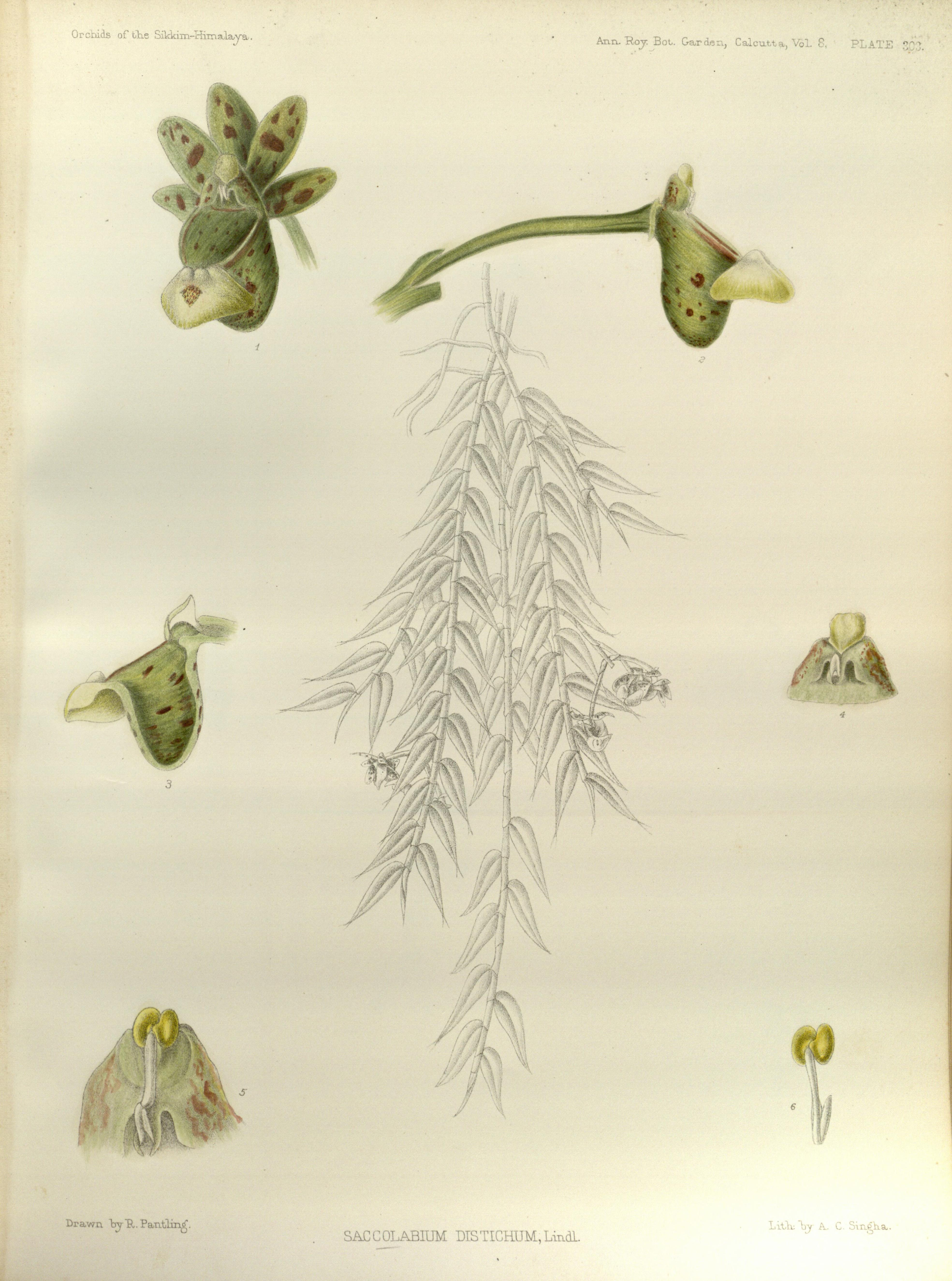

Scientific classification
- Kingdom: Plantae
- Clade: Tracheophytes
- Clade: Angiosperms
- Clade: Monocots
- Order: Asparagales
- Family: Orchidaceae
- Subfamily: Epidendroideae
- Genus: Gastrochilus
- Species: G. distichus

Binomial name
- Gastrochilus distichus (Lindl.) Kuntze

Synonyms
- Saccolabium distichum Lindl. (basionym); Gastrochilus biglandulosus Kuntze

= Gastrochilus distichus =

Species of orchid

Gastrochilus distichus is a small species of orchid and pendant growing epiphyte. It is known by the common name distichous gastrochilus. It is found in Himalayas of India, Nepal, Bhutan, Assam, Sikkim, Tibet and Yunnan. It grows in the shade on moss covered rainforest at elevations of 1520–2700 m.

== Description ==
Gastrochilus distichus has slim, clustered pendants with its branches stems enveloped by leaf bearing sheaths. Stems carry several narrow, two-ranked, stalkless, and long pointed fleshy leaves. The plant blooms in spring on a leaf opposed, hairless, slender, raceme-like, 2-4 flowered, more or less sigmoid-shaped inflorescence with 2 distant, lanceolate, basally tubular bracts and oblong, subacute floral bracts. The flowers are light green with reddy-brown spots. Sepals are similar, usually concave, oblong-elliptic, 4.5-5 × 2.5–3 mm, apex obtuse. Petals are somewhat obovate, slightly smaller than sepals, tip blunt, lip with an epichile and a saccate hypochile. Epichile is nearly suborbicular, about 3 × 5 mm, adaxially hairless, with a central cushion, near base with 2 conic calli, entire, obtuse at apex. Hypochile is subcupular, about 4 mm tall, 2–3 mm in diameter, apex rounded.
