= Gastrochilus kadooriei =

Scientific classification
- Kingdom: Plantae
- Clade: Tracheophytes
- Clade: Angiosperms
- Clade: Monocots
- Order: Asparagales
- Family: Orchidaceae
- Subfamily: Epidendroideae
- Genus: Gastrochilus
- Species: G. kadooriei

Binomial name
- Gastrochilus kadooriei Kumar, S.W.Gale, Kocyan, G.A.Fisch. & Aver.

Species of orchid

Gastrochilus kadooriei is a species of Gastrochilus. published in the journal Phytotaxa on 4 April 2014. This species is endemic to Indo-Burma Biodiversity Hotspot and distributed in China, Laos and Vietnam. This was recently discovered in Hong Kong and has been named after Sir Horace Kadoorie.
