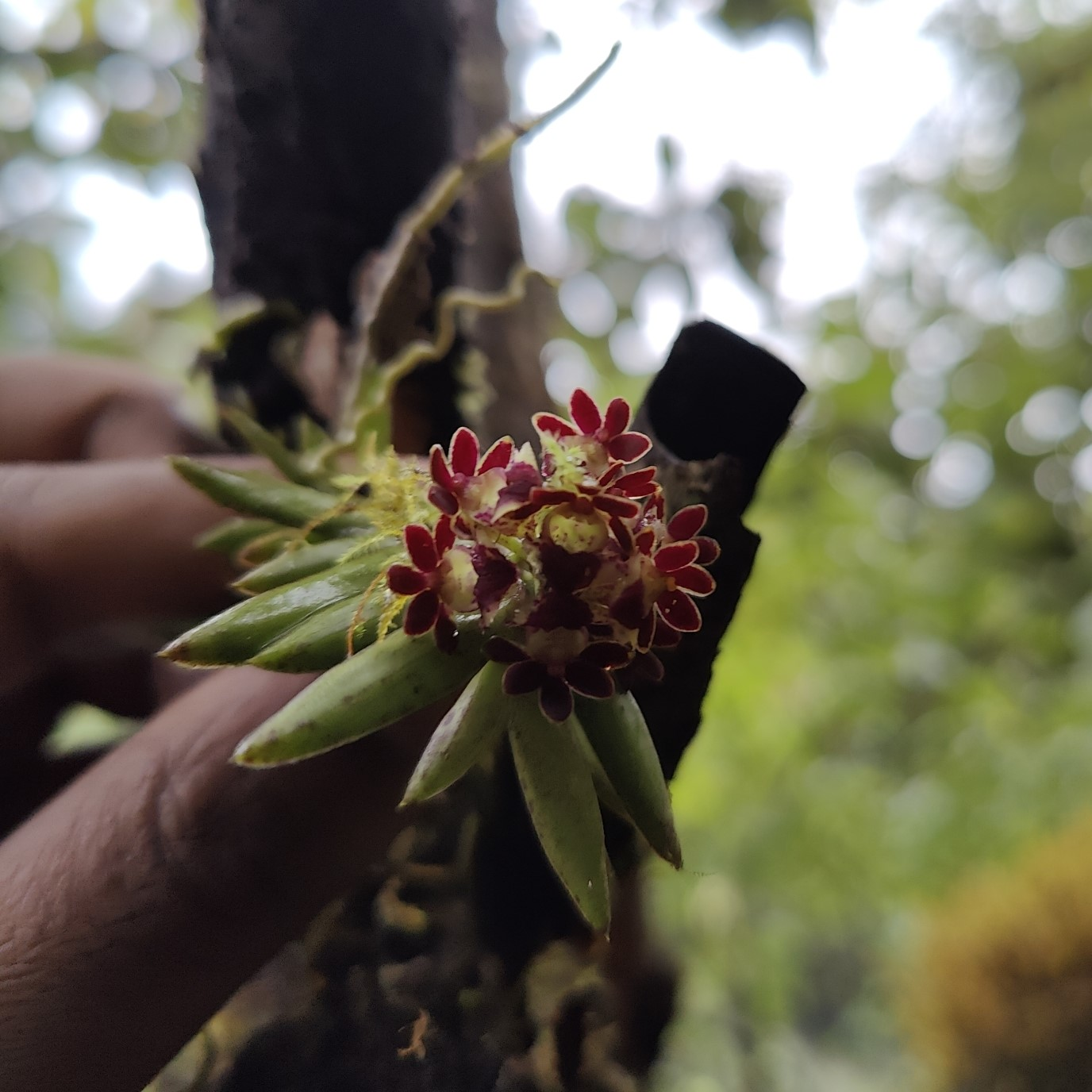

Scientific classification
- Kingdom: Plantae
- Clade: Tracheophytes
- Clade: Angiosperms
- Clade: Monocots
- Order: Asparagales
- Family: Orchidaceae
- Subfamily: Epidendroideae
- Genus: Gastrochilus
- Species: G. affinis

Binomial name
- Gastrochilus affinis (King & Pantl.) Schltr.

Synonyms
- Saccolabium affine King & Pantl.; Gastrochilus nepalensis Raskoti

= Gastrochilus affinis =

Species of orchid

Gastrochilus affinis is a species of orchid in the family Orchidaceae. It is native to Yunnan, Nepal, Assam, Bhutan and Sikkim.
