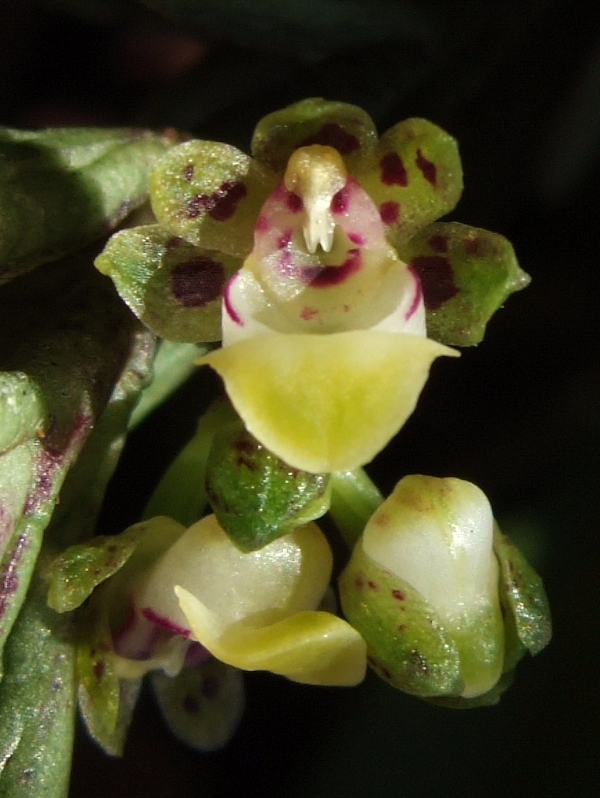

Scientific classification
- Kingdom: Plantae
- Clade: Tracheophytes
- Clade: Angiosperms
- Clade: Monocots
- Order: Asparagales
- Family: Orchidaceae
- Subfamily: Epidendroideae
- Genus: Gastrochilus
- Species: G. pseudodistichus

Binomial name
- Gastrochilus pseudodistichus (King & Pantl.) Schltr.

Synonyms
- Saccolabium pseudodistichum King & Pantl. (basionym); Saccolabium hoyopse Rolfe ex Downie; Gastrochilus hoyopsis (Rolfe ex Downie) Seidenf. & Smitinand; Saccolabium distichum var. pseudodistichum (King & Pantl.) Finet in H.Lecomte

= Gastrochilus pseudodistichus =

Species of orchid

Gastrochilus pseudodistichus is a species of orchid in the family Orchidaceae. It is native to Asia (Nepal, Yunnan, Assam, Bhutan, Thailand and Vietnam].
