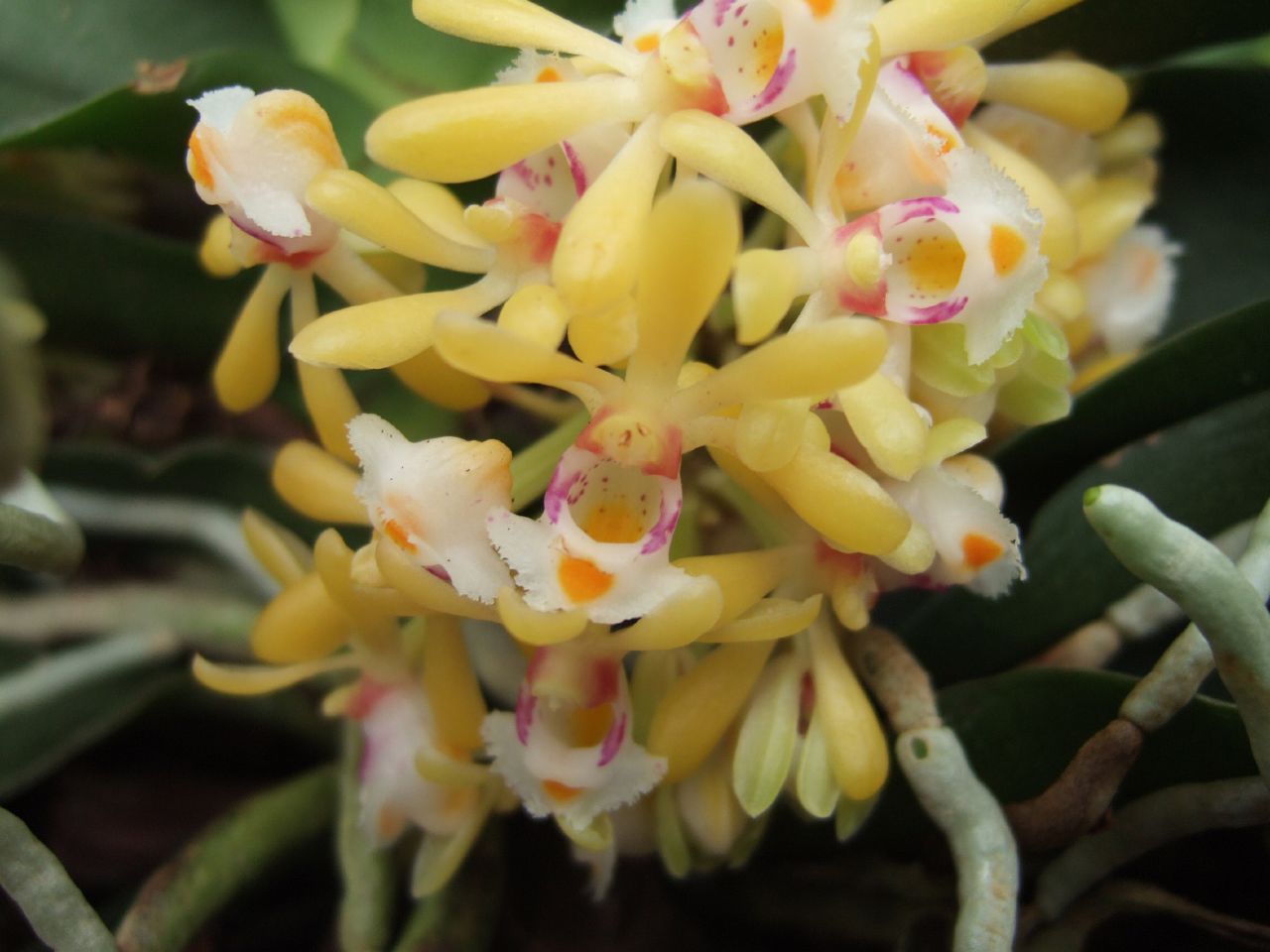

Scientific classification
- Kingdom: Plantae
- Clade: Tracheophytes
- Clade: Angiosperms
- Clade: Monocots
- Order: Asparagales
- Family: Orchidaceae
- Subfamily: Epidendroideae
- Genus: Gastrochilus
- Species: G. obliquus

Binomial name
- Gastrochilus obliquus (Lindl.) Kuntze

Synonyms
- Saccolabium obliquum Lindl. (basionym); Vanda obliqua Wall. ex Hook.f.; Saccolabium bigibbum Rchb.f. ex Hook.f.; Gastrochilus bigibbus (Rchb.f. ex Hook.f.) Kuntze

= Gastrochilus obliquus =

Species of orchid

Gastrochilus obliquus is a species of orchid native to China, the Himalayas and Southeast Asia. It grows on tree trunks at forest margins. Two varieties are recognized:

- Gastrochilus obliquus var. obliquus - Sichuan, Yunnan, India, Nepal, Bhutan, Assam, Andaman Islands, Myanmar, Thailand, Laos, Vietnam
- Gastrochilus obliquus var. suavis (Seidenf.) Z.H.Tsi - Thailand
