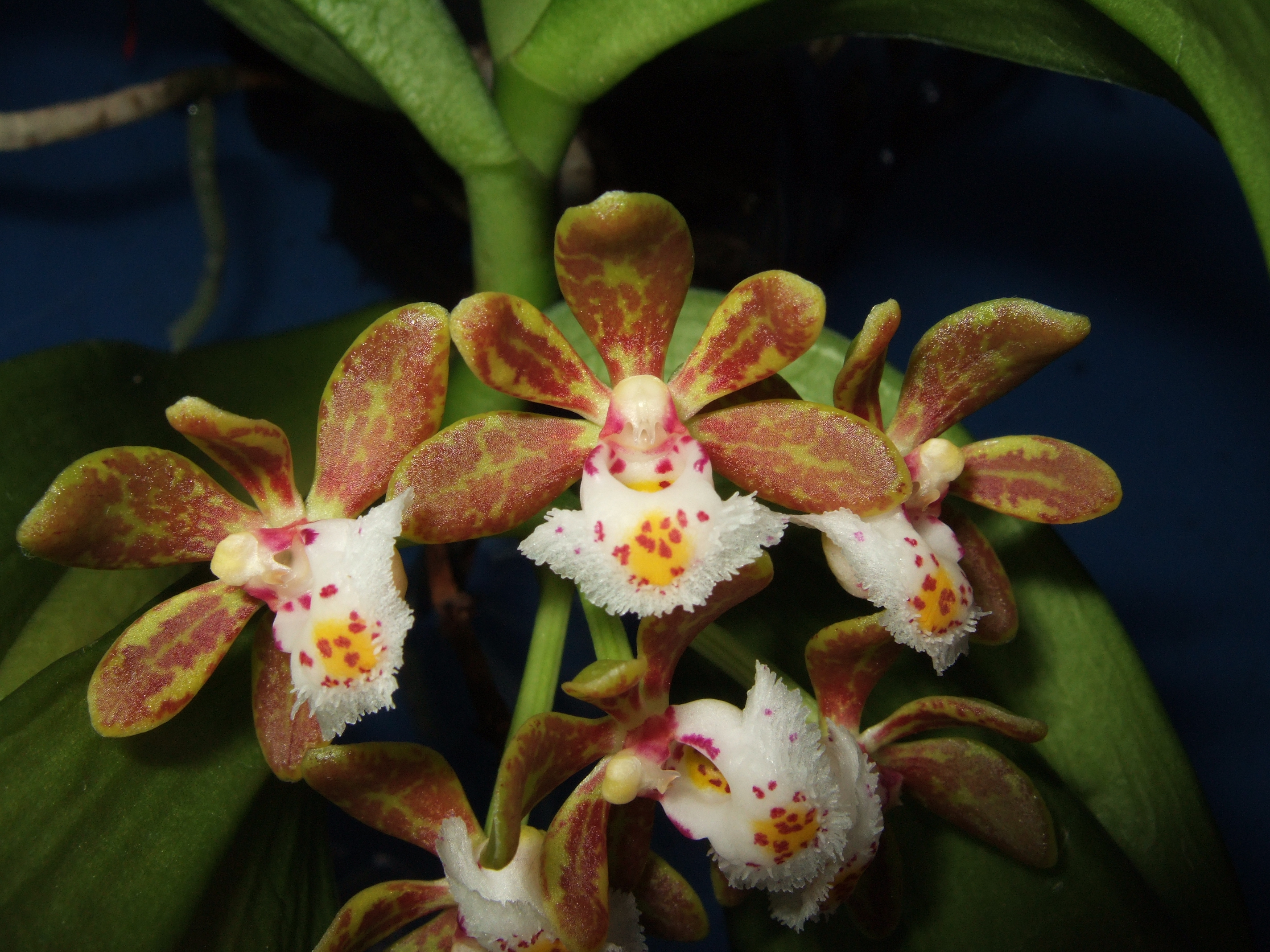

Scientific classification
- Kingdom: Plantae
- Clade: Tracheophytes
- Clade: Angiosperms
- Clade: Monocots
- Order: Asparagales
- Family: Orchidaceae
- Subfamily: Epidendroideae
- Genus: Gastrochilus
- Species: G. acutifolius

Binomial name
- Gastrochilus acutifolius (Lindl.) Kuntze

Synonyms
- Aerides umbellata Wall.; Saccolabium acutifolium Lindl. (basionym); Saccolabium denticulatum Paxton; Saccolabium dentatum Rchb.f.; Gastrochilus dentatus (Rchb.f.) Kuntze; Gastrochilus denticulatus (Paxton) Kuntze

= Gastrochilus acutifolius =

Species of plant

Gastrochilus acutifolius is a species of orchid found in Assam (India), eastern Himalayas, Nepal, Myanmar and Vietnam. The specific epithet, acutifolius, meaning "thorny leaves", is derived from Latin acutus (pointed, acute), and -folius (-leaved), and refers to the characteristic shape of the leaves.
