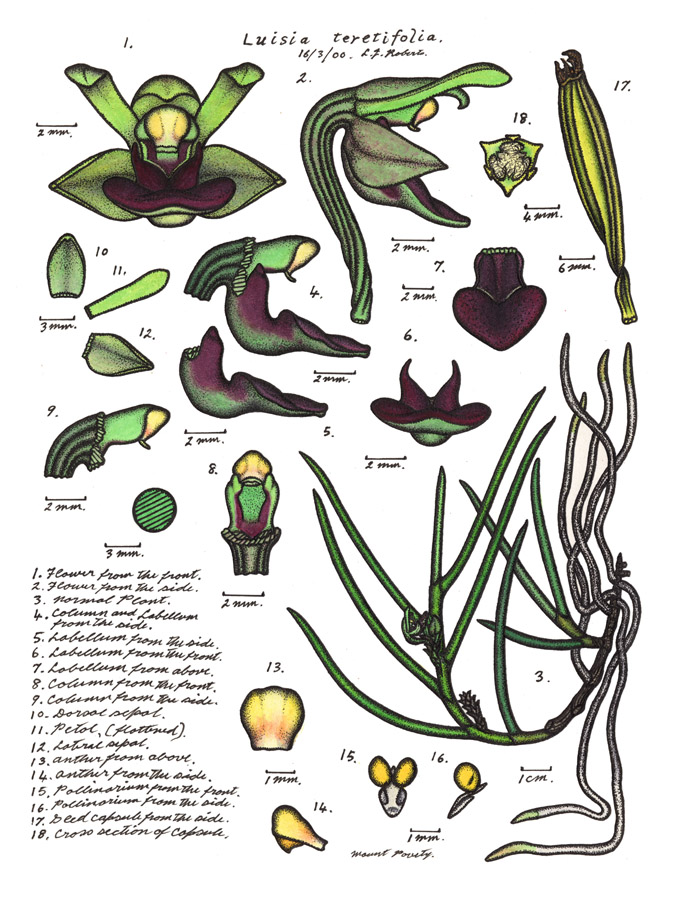
- Illustration by Lewis Roberts

Scientific classification
- Kingdom: Plantae
- Clade: Tracheophytes
- Clade: Angiosperms
- Clade: Monocots
- Order: Asparagales
- Family: Orchidaceae
- Subfamily: Epidendroideae
- Genus: Luisia
- Species: L. tristis

Binomial name
- Luisia tristis (G.Forst.) Hook.f.

Synonyms
- Cymbidium triste (G.Forst.) Willd.; Epidendrum triste G.Forst.; Luisia atacta D.L.Jones; Luisia beccarii Rchb.f.; Luisia corrugata D.L.Jones; Luisia macrocarpa Schltr.

= Luisia tristis =

Velvet orchid

Species of orchid

Luisia tristis, commonly known as the velvet orchid, is a species of epiphytic or lithophytic orchid with wiry stems often forming tangled clumps, cylindrical leaves and flowering stems with up to three green flowers with a dark red to dark maroon labellum. This orchid occurs in tropical Asia, New Guinea, Australia and some islands of the Western Pacific Ocean.

== Description ==
Luisia tristis is an epiphytic or lithophytic herb that forms straggling or tangled clumps and has thick, flattened roots and wiry stems 100–400 millimetres (3.9–16 in) long and 1–3 millimetres (0.039–0.12 in) wide. Between two and ten rigid, cylindrical leaves 50–200 millimetres (2.0–7.9 in) long, 4–5 millimetres (0.16–0.20 in) wide are arranged along the stems 12–35 millimetres (0.47–1.4 in) apart. Up to three green resupinate, star-like flowers 7–8 millimetres (0.28–0.31 in) long and 9–11 millimetres (0.35–0.43 in) wide are on flowering stems 5–15 millimetres (0.20–0.59 in) long arising from leaf axils. The sepals are about 6 millimetres (0.24 in) long, 2.5 millimetres (0.098 in) wide and the petals are slightly longer but narrower. The labellum is dark red to dark maroon, about 7 millimetres (0.28 in) long and wide with three fleshy lobes. There is an oblong hyopchile at the base of the labellum and a heart-shaped upper epichile. Flowering occurs from November to April.

== Taxonomy and naming ==
The velvet orchid was first formally described in 1786 by Georg Forster who gave it the name Epidendrum triste and published the description in Florulae Insularum Australium Prodromus. In 1890 Joseph Dalton Hooker changed the name to Luisia tristis. The specific epithet (tristis) is a Latin word meaning "sad".

== Distribution and habitat ==
The velvet orchid usually grows on rough-barked trees in well lit rainforest. It is found in southern Taiwan, the Lesser Sunda Islands, the Maluku Islands, the Philippines, Guam, New Guinea, the Solomon Islands, Fiji, New Caledonia, Samoa, Vanuatu and Australia. In Australia it occurs in the Northern Territory including Melville Island and on some Torres Strait Islands and the Cape York Peninsula in Queensland as far south as the Daintree River.
