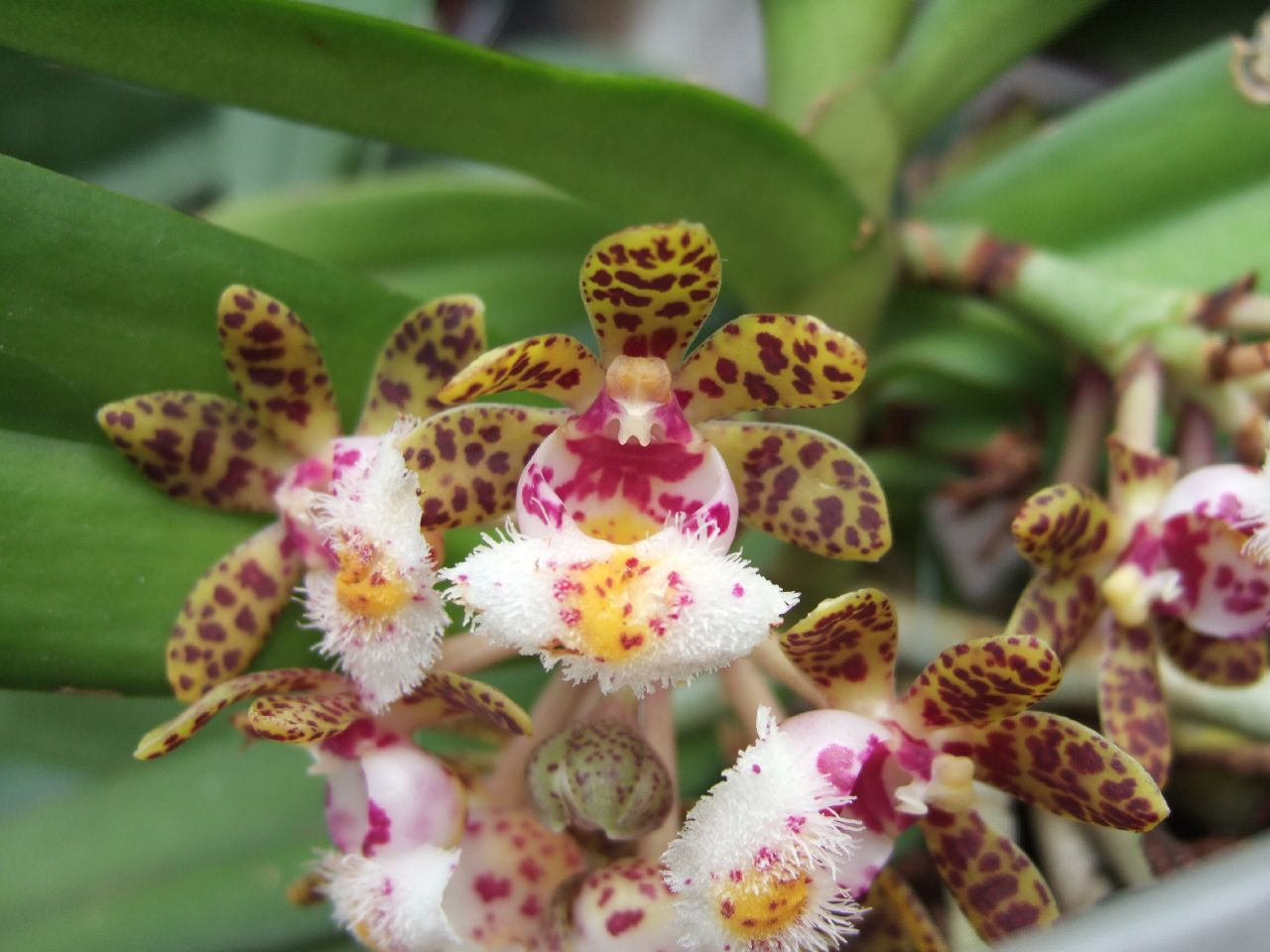
- Gastrochilus bellinus

Scientific classification
- Kingdom: Plantae
- Clade: Tracheophytes
- Clade: Angiosperms
- Clade: Monocots
- Order: Asparagales
- Family: Orchidaceae
- Subfamily: Epidendroideae
- Tribe: Vandeae
- Subtribe: Aeridinae
- Genus: Gastrochilus; D.Don

Synonyms
- Haraella Kudô; Luisiopsis C.S.Kumar & P.C.S.Kumar

= Gastrochilus =

Genus of orchids

Gastrochilus, abbreviated Gchls in horticultural trade, is a genus of plant in family Orchidaceae. It is native to eastern and southeastern Asia, including China, Japan, Bangladesh, Thailand, Malaysia, Indonesia, the Philippines, Nepal etc.

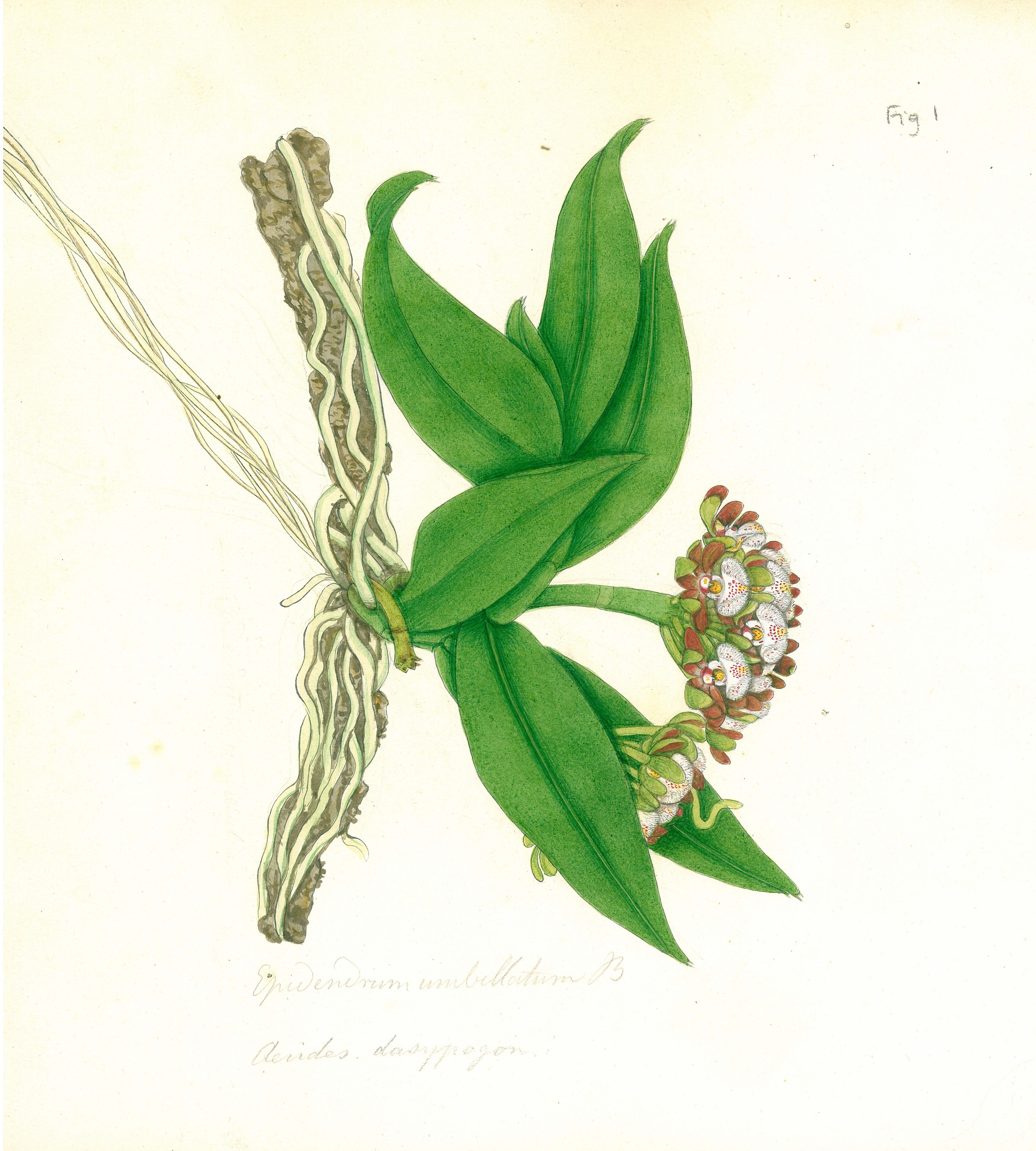
Drawing of the type of Gastrochilus dasypogon by Francis Buchanan-Hamilton

== Species ==
Species currently accepted (June 2014):

1. Gastrochilus acaulis (Lindl.) Kuntze
2. Gastrochilus acinacifolius Z.H.Tsi
3. Gastrochilus acutifolius (Lindl.) Kuntze
4. Gastrochilus affinis (King & Pantl.) Schltr.
5. Gastrochilus alatus X.H.Jin & S.C.Chen
6. Gastrochilus arunachalensis A.N.Rao
7. Gastrochilus bellinus (Rchb.f.) Kuntze
8. Gastrochilus brevifimbriatus S.R.Yi
9. Gastrochilus calceolaris (Buch.-Ham. ex Sm.) D.Don
10. Gastrochilus carnosus Z.H. Tsi
11. Gastrochilus ciliaris Maek.
12. Gastrochilus corymbosus A.P. Das & Chanda
13. Gastrochilus dasypogon (Sm.) Kuntze
14. Gastrochilus distichus (Lindl.) Kuntze
15. Gastrochilus fargesii (Kraenzl.) Schltr
16. Gastrochilus flabelliformis (Blatt. & McCann) C.J. Saldanha
17. Gastrochilus fargesii (Kraenzl.) Schltr.
18. Gastrochilus formosanus (Hayata) Hayata
19. Gastrochilus garhwalensis Z.H. Tsi
20. Gastrochilus gongshanensis Z.H. Tsi
21. Gastrochilus guangtungensis Z.H. Tsi
22. Gastrochilus hainanensis Z.H. Tsi
23. Gastrochilus hoii T.P. Lin
24. Gastrochilus inconspicuus (Hook.f.) Kuntze
25. Gastrochilus intermedius (Griff. ex Lindl.) Kuntze
26. Gastrochilus japonicus (Makino) Schltr.
27. Gastrochilus kadooriei Kumar, S.W.Gale, Kocyan, G.A.Fisch. & Aver.
28. Gastrochilus linii Ormerod
29. Gastrochilus linearifolius Z.H.Tsi & Garay
30. Gastrochilus malipoensis X.H.Jin & S.C.Chen
31. Gastrochilus matsudae Hayata
32. Gastrochilus matsuran (Makino) Schltr.
33. Gastrochilus minutiflorus Aver.
34. Gastrochilus nanchuanensis Z.H. Tsi
35. Gastrochilus nanus Z.H. Tsi
36. Gastrochilus obliquus (Lindl.) Kuntze
37. Gastrochilus patinatus (Ridl.) Schltr.
38. Gastrochilus pechei (Rchb.f.) Kuntze
39. Gastrochilus platycalcaratus (Rolfe) Schltr.
40. Gastrochilus pseudodistichus (King & Pantl.) Schltr.
41. Gastrochilus puncticulatus Cavestro
42. Gastrochilus rantabunensis C. Chow ex T.P. Lin
43. Gastrochilus raraensis Fukuy.
44. Gastrochilus rutilans Seidenf.
45. Gastrochilus saccatus Z.H. Tsi
46. Gastrochilus sessanicus A.N. Rao
47. Gastrochilus simplicilabius Aver.
48. Gastrochilus sinensis Z.H. Tsi
49. Gastrochilus somae (Hayata) Hayata
50. Gastrochilus sonamii Lucksom
51. Gastrochilus sororius Schltr.
52. Gastrochilus subpapillosus Z.H. Tsi
53. Gastrochilus sukhakulii Seidenf.
54. Gastrochilus sumatranus J.J. Sm.
55. Gastrochilus sutepensis (Rolfe ex Downie) Seidenf. & Smitinand
56. Gastrochilus toramanus (Makino) Schltr.
57. Gastrochilus xuanenensis Z.H. Tsi
58. Gastrochilus yunnanensis Schltr.
