= Buxus liukiuensis =

Scientific classification
- Kingdom: Plantae
- Clade: Tracheophytes
- Clade: Angiosperms
- Clade: Eudicots
- Order: Buxales
- Family: Buxaceae
- Genus: Buxus
- Species: B. liukiuensis

Binomial name
- Buxus liukiuensis (Makino) Makino

Synonyms
- Buxus liukiuensis f. glabra Hiyama; Buxus liukiuensis var. longipedicellata Hatus.; Buxus microphylla var. liukiuensis (Makino) S.S.Ying; Buxus sempervirens var. liukiuensis Makino

Species of plant

Buxus liukiuensis is a species of flowering plant in the box family Buxaceae, native to the Ryukyu Islands, and Taiwan. A shrub, it is found at low to middle elevations.
