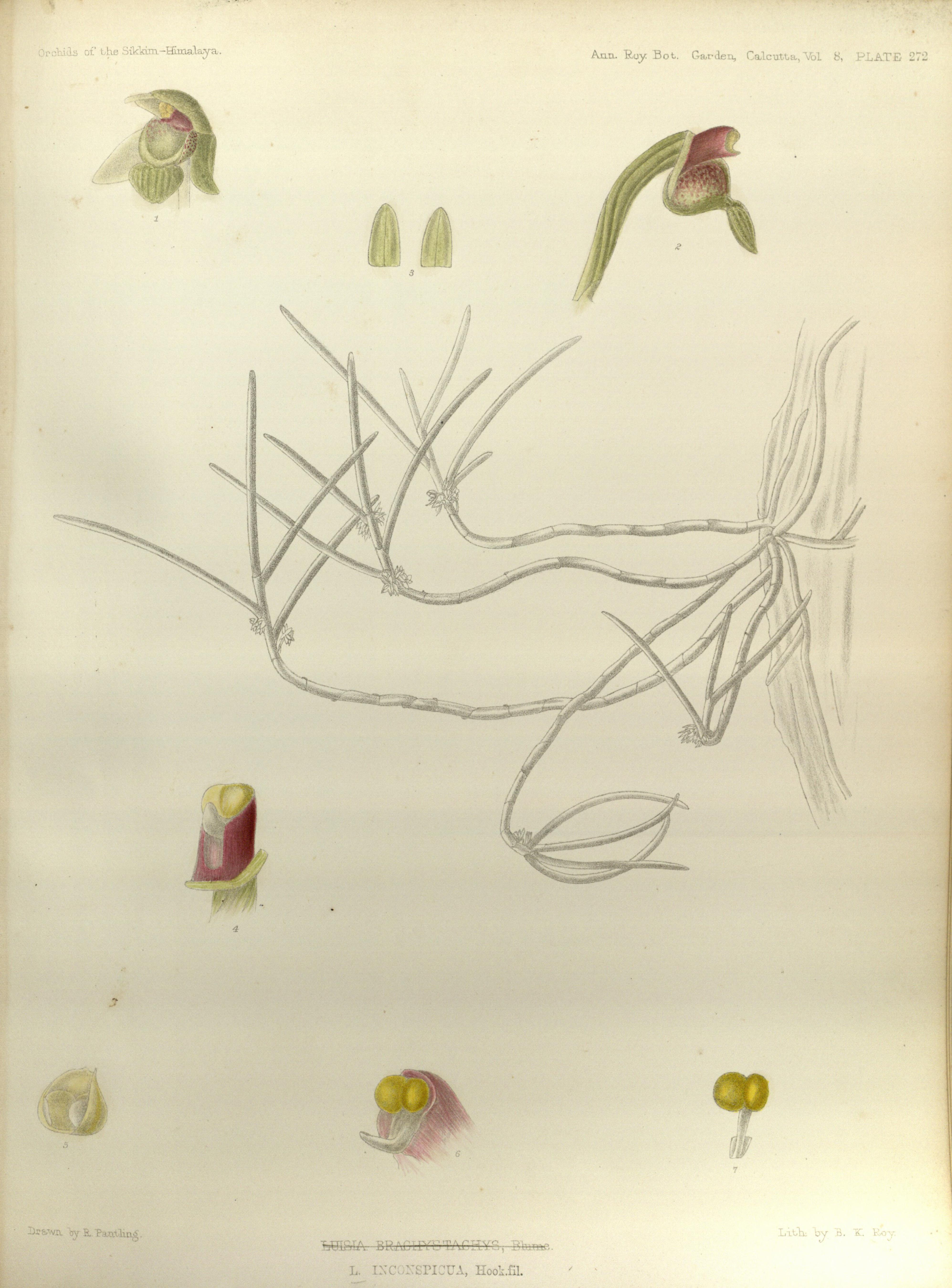

Scientific classification
- Kingdom: Plantae
- Clade: Tracheophytes
- Clade: Angiosperms
- Clade: Monocots
- Order: Asparagales
- Family: Orchidaceae
- Subfamily: Epidendroideae
- Genus: Gastrochilus
- Species: G. inconspicuus

Binomial name
- Gastrochilus inconspicuus (Hook.f.) Kuntze

Synonyms
- Saccolabium inconspicuum Hook.f. (basionym); Luisia micrantha Hook.f.; Cymbidium inconspicuum Wall. ex Hook.f.; Luisia inconspicua (Hook.f.) King & Pantl.; Luisiopsis inconspicua (Hook.f.) Sath. Kumar & P.C.S. Kumar

= Gastrochilus inconspicuus =

Species of orchid

Gastrochilus inconspicuus is a species of orchid. It is native to the Himalayas of Nepal, India, Bhutan, Sikkim, and Assam, south to Bangladesh.
