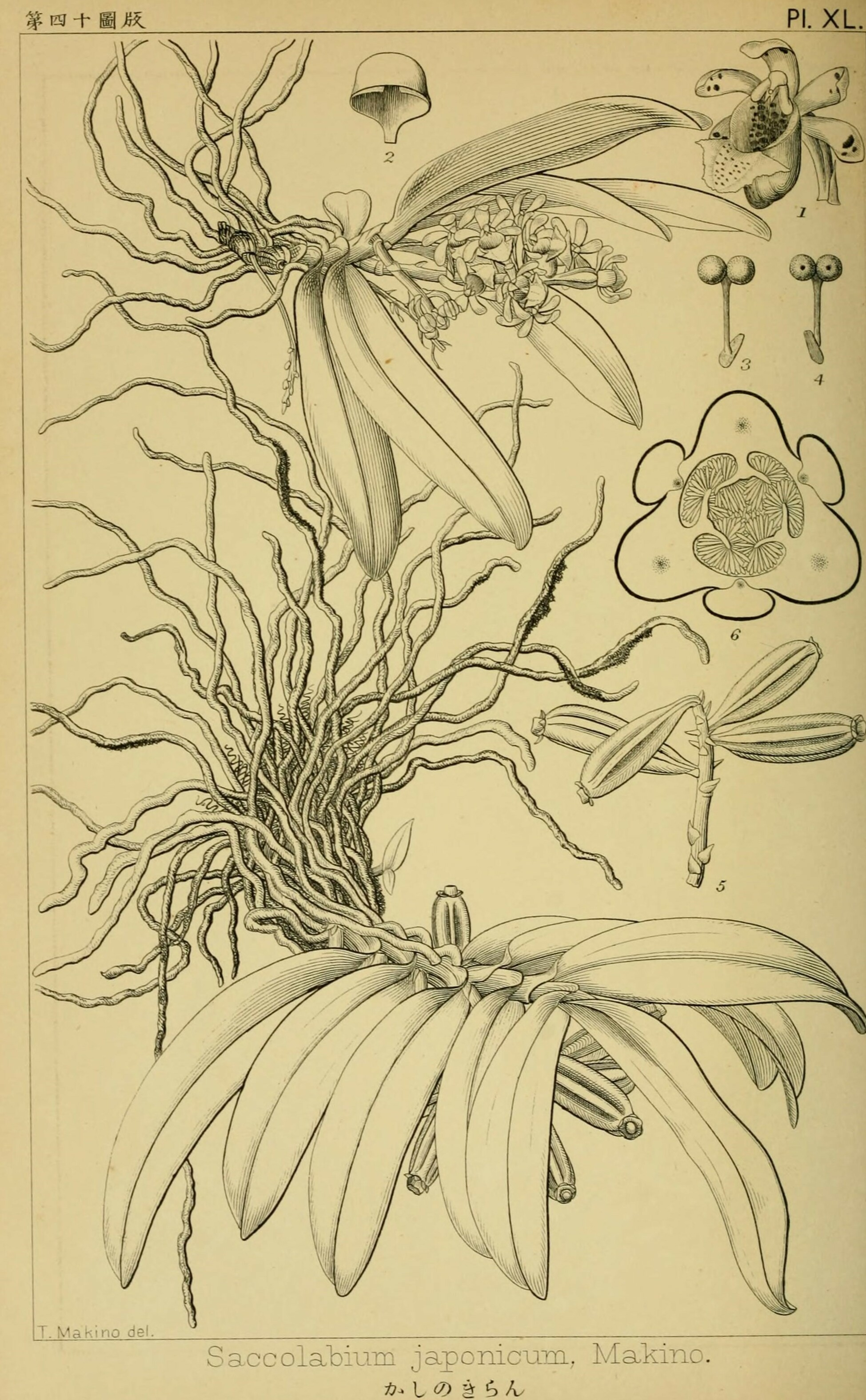

Scientific classification
- Kingdom: Plantae
- Clade: Tracheophytes
- Clade: Angiosperms
- Clade: Monocots
- Order: Asparagales
- Family: Orchidaceae
- Subfamily: Epidendroideae
- Genus: Gastrochilus
- Species: G. japonicus

Binomial name
- Gastrochilus japonicus (Makino) Schltr.

Synonyms
- Homotypic Synonyms: Saccolabium japonicum Makino; Heterotypic Synonyms: Gastrochilus holttumianus S.Y.Hu & Barretto; Gastrochilus taiwanianus S.S.Ying

= Gastrochilus japonicus =

Species of orchid

Gastrochilus japonicus, known as Tamra gastrochilus, is a species of orchid in the family Orchidaceae. It is native to Japan (including the Ryukyu Islands), Korea, Taiwan and Hong Kong.
