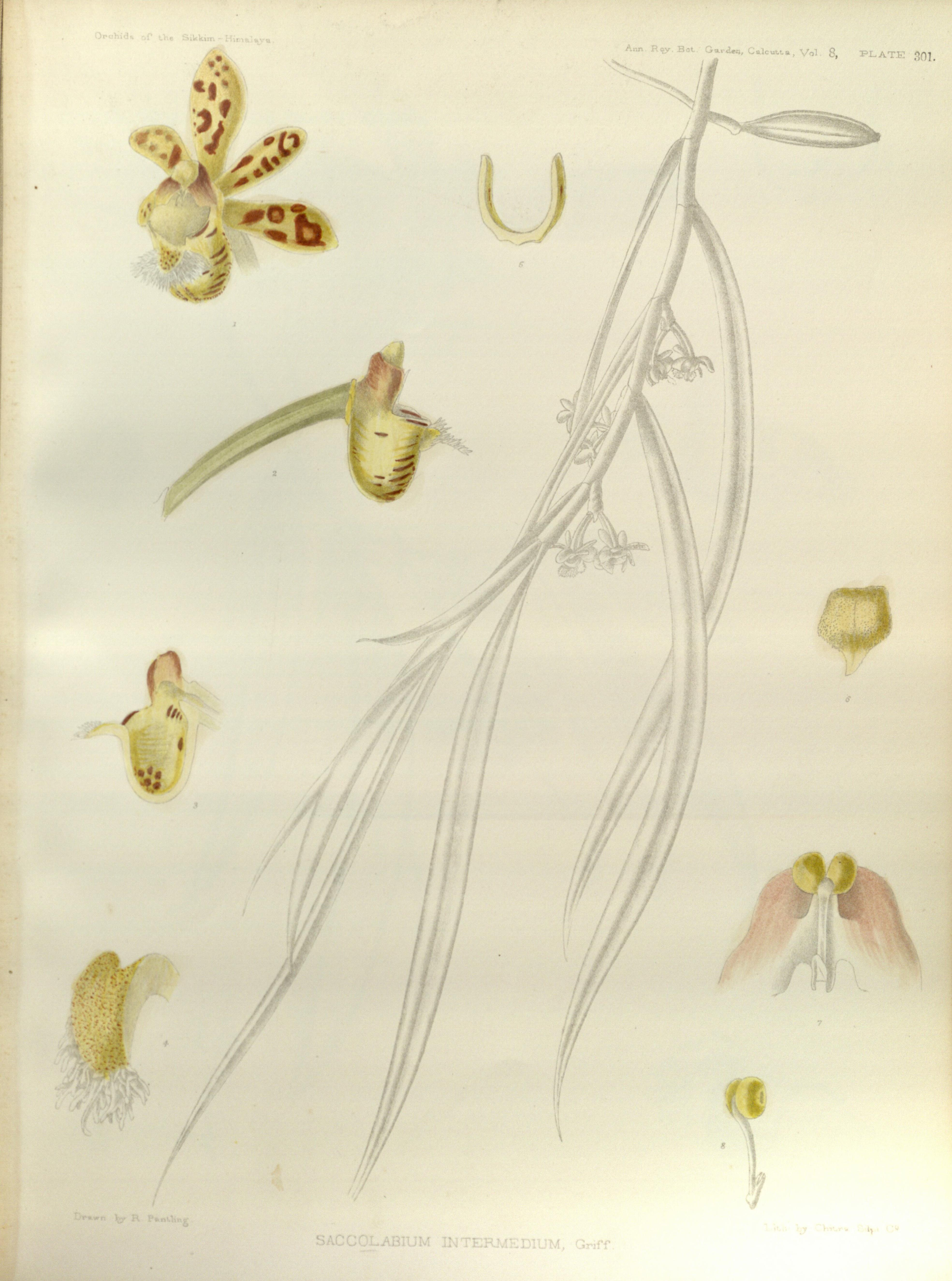

Scientific classification
- Kingdom: Plantae
- Clade: Tracheophytes
- Clade: Angiosperms
- Clade: Monocots
- Order: Asparagales
- Family: Orchidaceae
- Subfamily: Epidendroideae
- Genus: Gastrochilus
- Species: G. intermedius

Binomial name
- Gastrochilus intermedius (Griff. ex Lindl.) Kuntze

Synonyms
- Saccolabium intermedium Griff. ex Lindl. (basionym); Saccolabium calceolare Paxton

= Gastrochilus intermedius =

Species of orchid

Gastrochilus intermedius is a species of orchid growing in China (South East Sichuan), North East India, Thailand and Vietnam.
