= C. paniculatum =

C. paniculatum may refer to:

- Canarium paniculatum, a plant species endemic to Mauritius
- Cleisostoma paniculatum, an orchid species
- Combretum paniculatum, a plant species found in Africa
