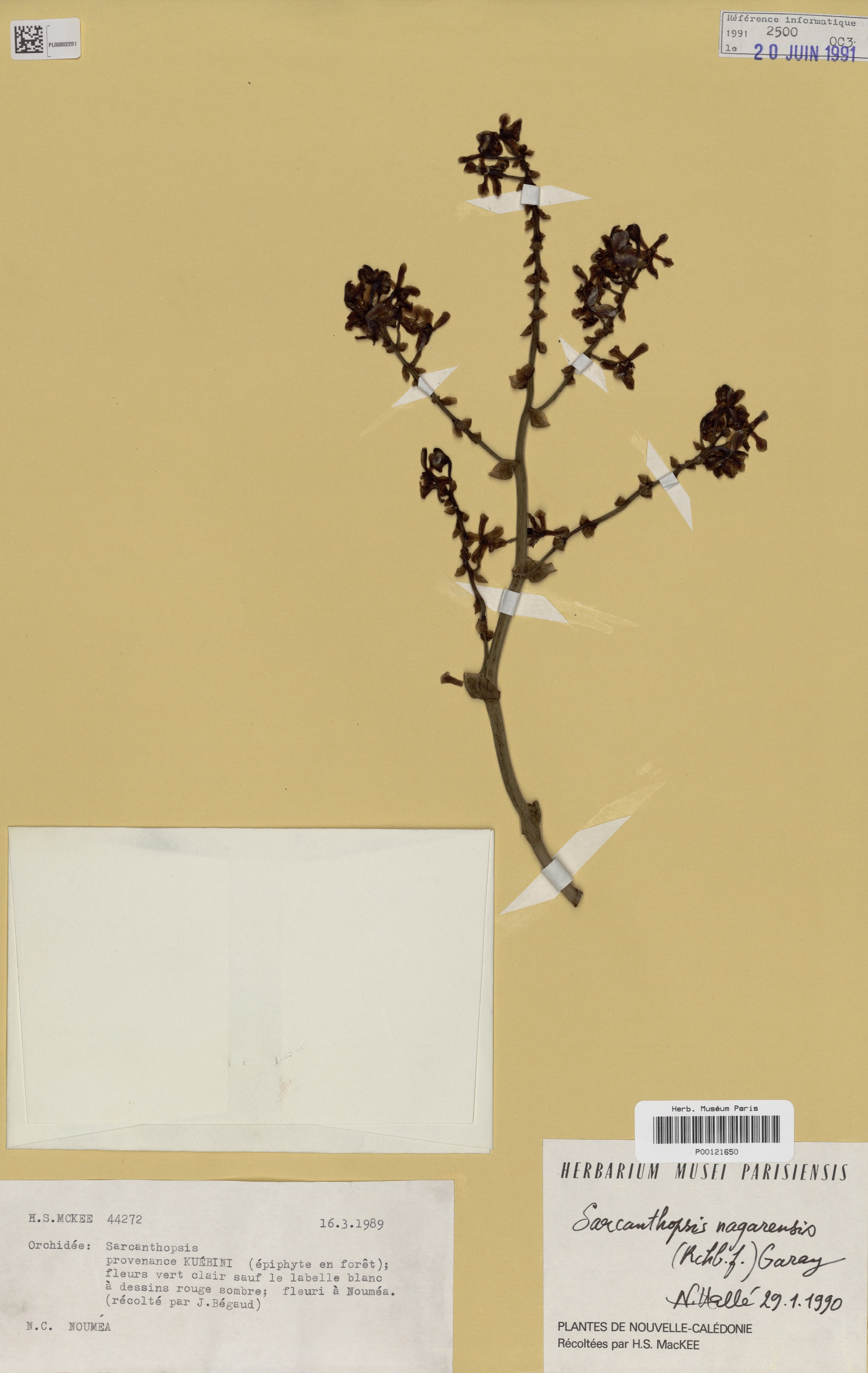

Scientific classification
- Kingdom: Plantae
- Clade: Tracheophytes
- Clade: Angiosperms
- Clade: Monocots
- Order: Asparagales
- Family: Orchidaceae
- Subfamily: Epidendroideae
- Tribe: Vandeae
- Subtribe: Aeridinae
- Genus: Sarcanthopsis; Garay

= Sarcanthopsis =

Genus of orchids

Sarcanthopsis, commonly known as goliath orchids, is a genus of six species of flowering plants from the orchid family, Orchidaceae. Plants in this genus are large epiphytes or lithophytes with long, thick, leathery stems, large, crowded leathery leaves and many yellowish flowers on a branched flowering stem. Orchids in this genus occur in New Guinea and islands of the south-west Pacific.

== Description ==
Orchids in the Sarcanthopsis are large epiphytic or lithophytic monopodial plants with smooth leaves and stems up to 3 metres (9.8 ft) long. A large number of leathery oblong leaves folded lengthwise have their bases wrapped around the stem. Yellowish resupinate flowers with brown spots, 20–30 millimetres (0.79–1.2 in) in diameter are arranged on a branching flowering stem and face in many different directions. The sepals and petals are free from and similar to each other in size and shape. The labellum is rigidly fixed to the column and has three lobes, a concave upper "hypochile" and lower "epichile" and a sharp bend in its middle.

== Taxonomy and naming ==
The genus Sarcanthopsis was first formally described in 1972 by Leslie Andrew Garay and the description was published in Harvard University Botanical Museum Leaflets. The name Sarcanthopsis refers to the similarity of orchids in this genus to those in the genus Sarcanthus, now known as Cleisostoma. The ending -opsis is an Ancient Greek suffix meaning "having the appearance of" or "like".

Species list The following is a list of species of Sarcanthopsis accepted by Plants of the World Online as at October 2025:

- Sarcanthopsis hansemannii (Kraenzl.) J.J.Wood & Ormerod - New Ireland
- Sarcanthopsis nagarensis (Rchb.f.) Garay - Fiji, Santa Cruz Islands, Wallis & Futuna
- Sarcanthopsis praealta (Rchb.f.) Garay - New Guinea
- Sarcanthopsis quaifei (Rolfe) Garay - New Caledonia, Vanuatu
- Sarcanthopsis warocqueana (Rolfe) Garay - Papua New Guinea
- Sarcanthopsis woodfordii Rolfe) Garay - Solomon Islands

== Distribution ==
Orchids in this genus are found in the Bismarck Archipelago, New Guinea, the Solomon Islands, Fiji, New Caledonia, the Santa Cruz Islands, Vanuatu and the Wallis and Futuna Islands. A single juvenile plant of Sarcanthopsis warocqueana has been seen on Moa Island, Queensland in the Torres Strait.

== See also ==
- List of Orchidaceae genera
