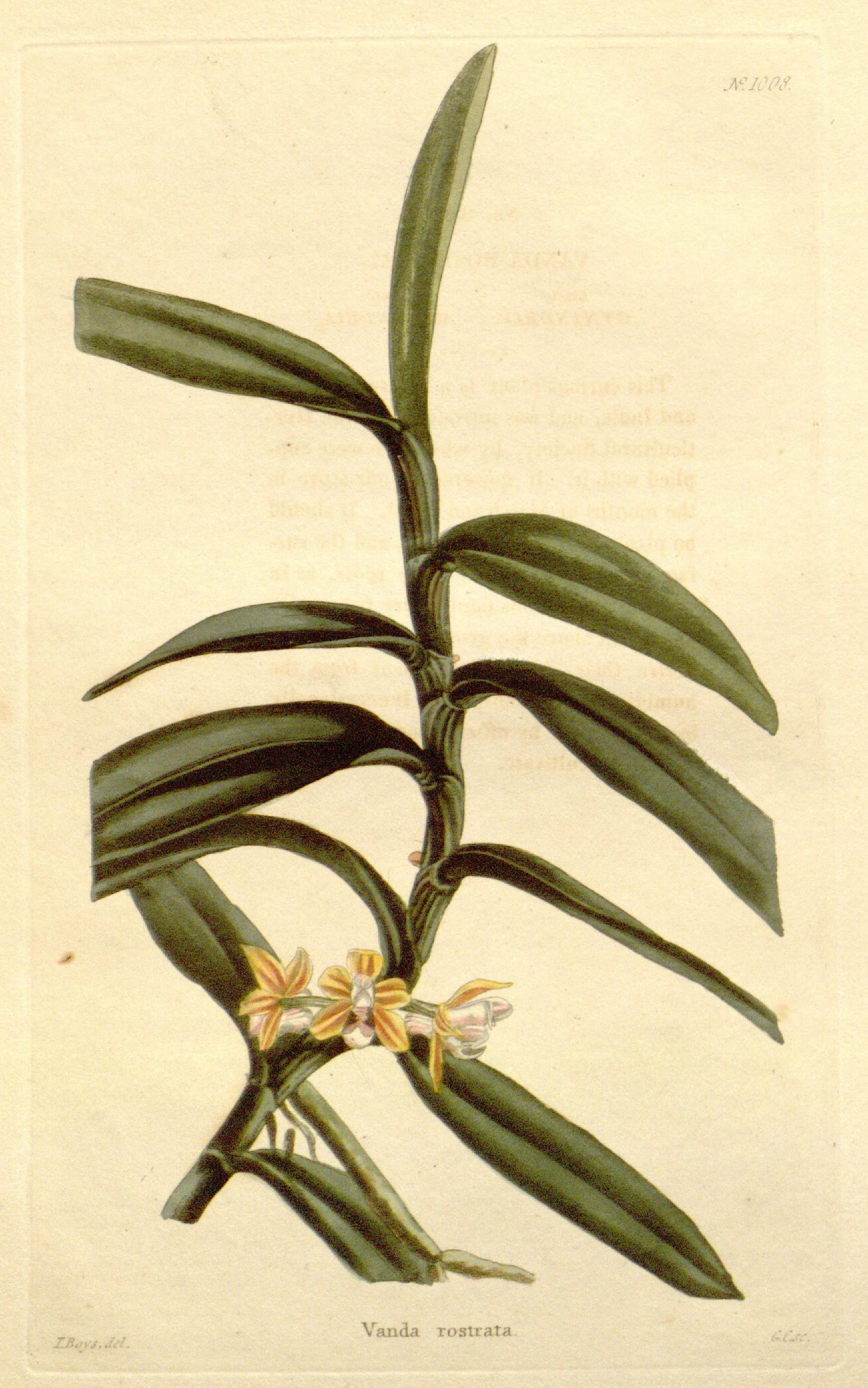

Scientific classification
- Kingdom: Plantae
- Clade: Tracheophytes
- Clade: Angiosperms
- Clade: Monocots
- Order: Asparagales
- Family: Orchidaceae
- Subfamily: Epidendroideae
- Genus: Cleisostoma
- Species: C. rostratum

Binomial name
- Cleisostoma rostratum (Lindl.) Garay

Synonyms
- Cleisostoma fordii Hance; Cleisostoma simondianum (Gagnep.) Garay; Saccolabium simondii Gagnep.; Sarcanthus fordii (Hance) Rolfe; Sarcanthus laosensis Guillaumin; Sarcanthus simondianus Gagnep.; Vanda recurva Hook.; Vanda rostrata G.Lodd.

= Cleisostoma rostratum =

Species of orchid

Cleisostoma rostratum is a species of orchid found in Cambodia, Laos, Thailand, Vietnam and China.
