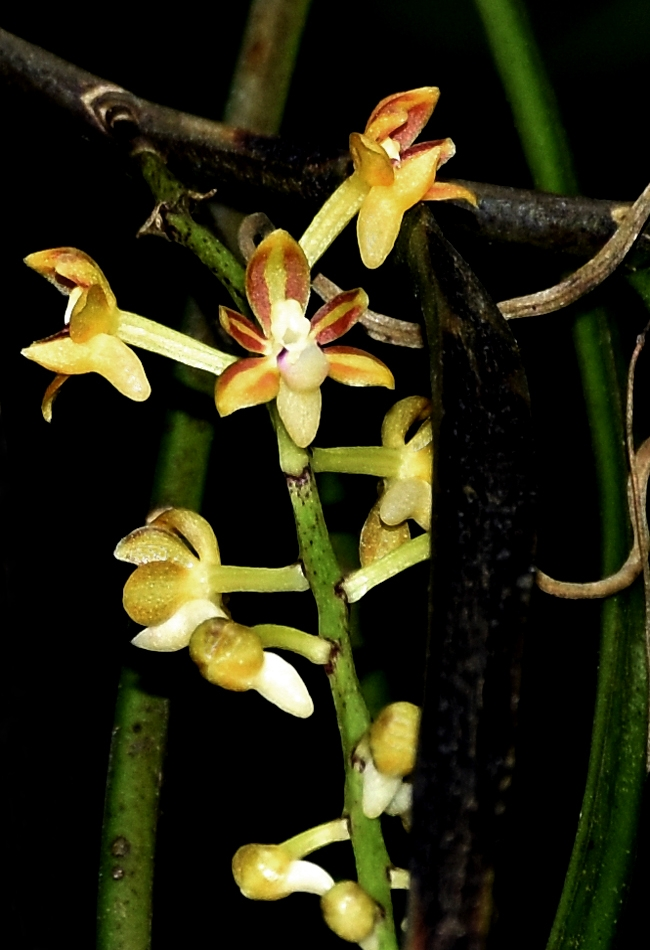

Scientific classification
- Kingdom: Plantae
- Clade: Tracheophytes
- Clade: Angiosperms
- Clade: Monocots
- Order: Asparagales
- Family: Orchidaceae
- Subfamily: Epidendroideae
- Tribe: Vandeae
- Subtribe: Aeridinae
- Genus: Cleisostoma
- Species: C. tenuifolium

Binomial name
- Cleisostoma tenuifolium (L.) Garay

Synonyms
- List: Aerides tenuifolia (L.) Moon; Cleisostoma pauciflorum (Wight) Senghas; Cymbidium tenuifolium (L.) Willd.; Epidendrum tenuifolium L.; Gastrochilus acuminatus (Thwaites) Kuntze; Saccolabium acuminatum Thwaites; Saccolabium peninsulare (Dalzell) Alston; Saccolabium tenuifolium (L.) Alston; Sarcanthus pauciflorus Wight; Sarcanthus peninsularis Dalzell; Sarcanthus tenuifolius (L.) Seidenf.; Sarcochilus tenuifolius (L.) Náves

= Cleisostoma tenuifolium =

Tender leaf closed-mouth orchid

Species of plant

Cleisostoma tenuifolium is a species of orchid, native to western India, Sri Lanka, eastern Myanmar and Thailand. It was first described by Carl Linnaeus in 1753 as Epidendrum tenuifolium. It is an epiphyte, attached to trees clinging downward, 10-40 cm long with a 5 cm long, raceme-like, several-flowered inflorescence. The flowers are yellow, with a dorsal sepal 4.5 × 1.2 mm.
