= Cleisostoma williamsoni =

Scientific classification
- Kingdom: Plantae
- Clade: Tracheophytes
- Clade: Angiosperms
- Clade: Monocots
- Order: Asparagales
- Family: Orchidaceae
- Subfamily: Epidendroideae
- Genus: Cleisostoma
- Species: C. williamsoni

Binomial name
- Cleisostoma williamsoni (Rchb.f.) Garay

Synonyms
- Several, including: Cleisostoma elegans Siedenf.; Echioglossum elegans (Seidenf.) Szlach.

Species of orchid

Cleisostoma williamsoni (common names: Williamson's cleisostom, in China: hong hua ge ju lan) is a species of orchid. It is found in Asia.
