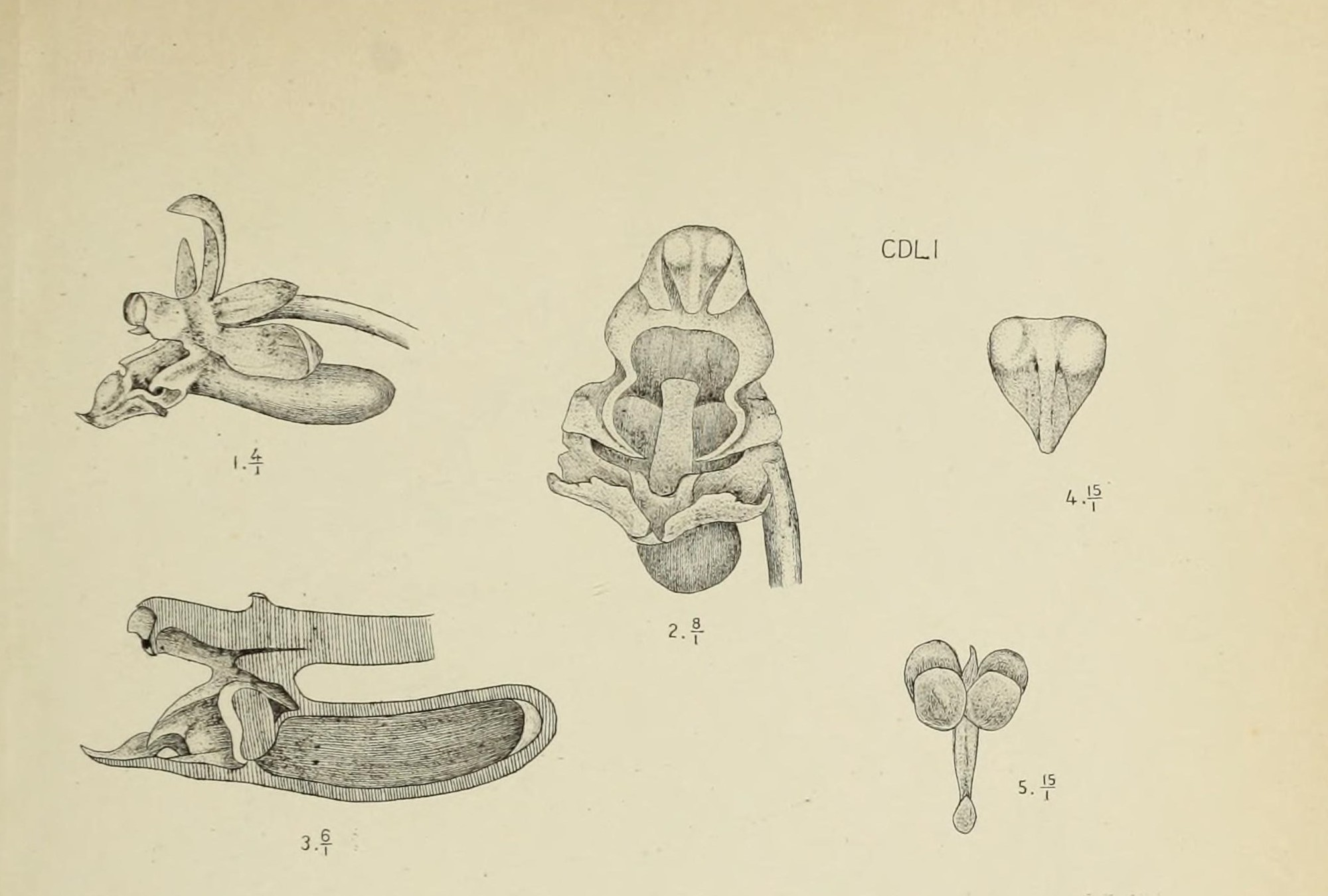

Scientific classification
- Kingdom: Plantae
- Clade: Tracheophytes
- Clade: Angiosperms
- Clade: Monocots
- Order: Asparagales
- Family: Orchidaceae
- Subfamily: Epidendroideae
- Genus: Cleisostoma
- Species: C. sagittatum

Binomial name
- Cleisostoma sagittatum Blume (1825)

= Cleisostoma sagittatum =

Species of orchid

Cleisostoma sagittatum is a species of orchid found in Borneo, Java, the Philippines and Sumatra. This species was first described by Blume in 1825.
