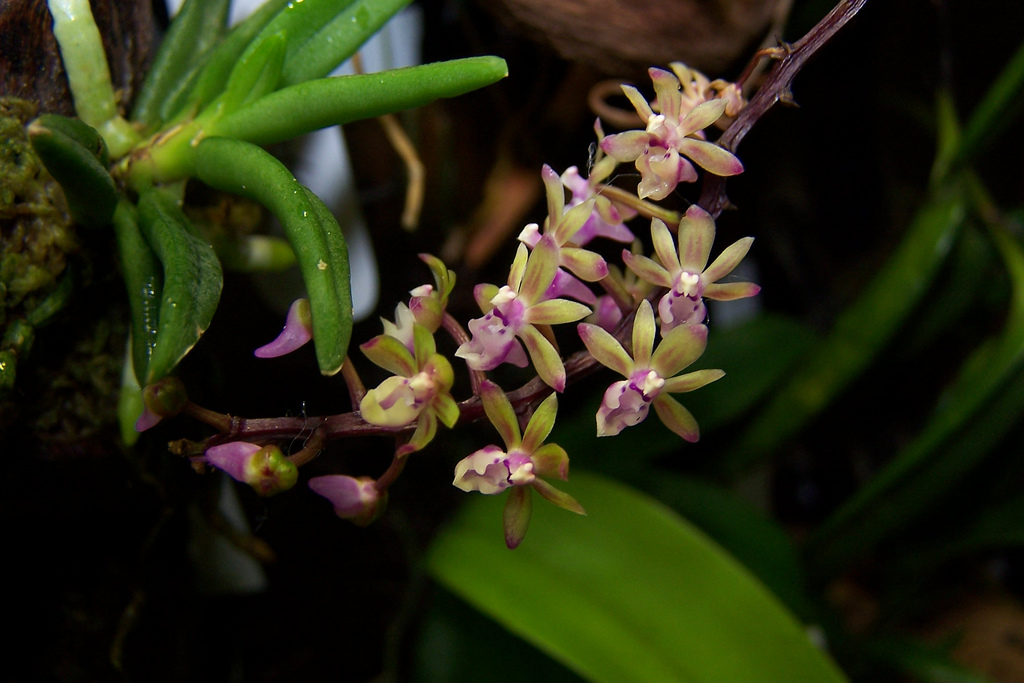

Scientific classification
- Kingdom: Plantae
- Clade: Tracheophytes
- Clade: Angiosperms
- Clade: Monocots
- Order: Asparagales
- Family: Orchidaceae
- Subfamily: Epidendroideae
- Genus: Cleisostoma
- Species: C. crochetii

Binomial name
- Cleisostoma crochetii (Guillaumin) Garay

= Cleisostoma crochetii =

Species of orchid

Cleisostoma crochetii is a species of orchid found in Vietnam, Cambodia and Laos.
