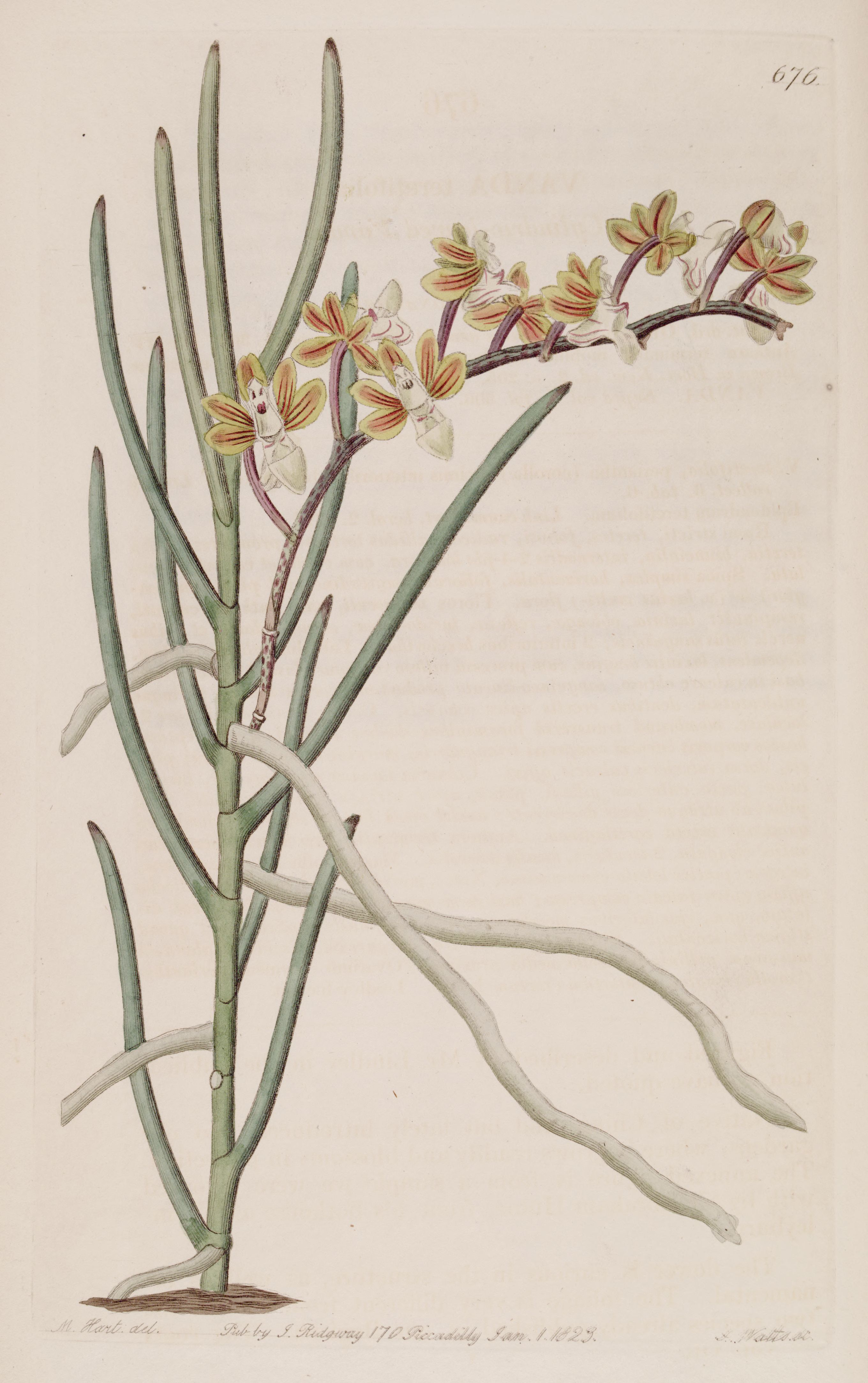
- 1822 illustration from Botanical Register

Scientific classification
- Kingdom: Plantae
- Clade: Tracheophytes
- Clade: Angiosperms
- Clade: Monocots
- Order: Asparagales
- Family: Orchidaceae
- Subfamily: Epidendroideae
- Genus: Cleisostoma
- Species: C. simondii

Binomial name
- Cleisostoma simondii (Gagnep.) Seidenf.

Synonyms
- Vanda simondii Gagnep. (1951) (Basionym); Vanda teretifolia Lindl. Coll. Bot.: t. 6 (1821), not Cleisostoma teretifolium Teijsm. & Binn. (1864); Sarcanthus teretifolius (Lindl.) Lindl. (1833); Sarcanthus siamensis Rolfe ex Downie (1925); Luisia acutilabris Guillaumin (1960); Cleisostoma seidenfadenii Garay (1972); Cleisostoma teres Garay (1972); Cleisostoma acutilabris (Guillaumin) Aver. (1988); Echioglossum simondii (Gagnep.) Szlach. (1995); Echioglossum seidenfadenii (Garay) Szlach. (1995)

= Cleisostoma simondii =

Species of orchid

Cleisostoma simondii is a flowering plant that grows upon larger trees, and known in Hong Kong as (Chinese:蜘蛛蘭). It also occurs in the Himalayas (Nepal, Bhutan, India, Assam), Cambodia, Laos, Myanmar, Thailand, Vietnam, and other parts of China (Fujian, Guangdong, Hainan, Yunnan).

== Etymology ==
The name "Cleisostoma" derives from the Greek words kleistos, meaning "closed" and "stoma" meaning "mouth".

== Description ==
Cleisostoma simondii grows to a length of 30–40 centimetres (12–16 in) or more, with numerous aerial roots that grow out of the stems. This hardy orchid grows thin, stem-like jointed leaves 10–28 centimetres (3.9–11.0 in) long that are fleshy, terete, linear year round, with the whole plant colors ranging from green to dark green under humid, low light conditions, to red to purple under drier more sunlit conditions. The flowers buds develop in late September, blooming long-lasting flowers from October to early November, on a spike up to 10–15 centimetres (3.9–5.9 in) long, composed from one to eleven flowers, averaging six to seven flowers, with each flower averaging 1.5 cm (15mm) in diameter.

== Varieties ==
Two varieties are recognized:

- Cleisostoma simondii var. guangdongense Z.H.Tsi - Fujian, S Guangdong, Hainan
- Cleisostoma simondii var. simondii - Yunnan, Himalayas (Nepal, Bhutan, India, Assam), Cambodia, Laos, Myanmar, Thailand, Vietnam

== Gallery ==
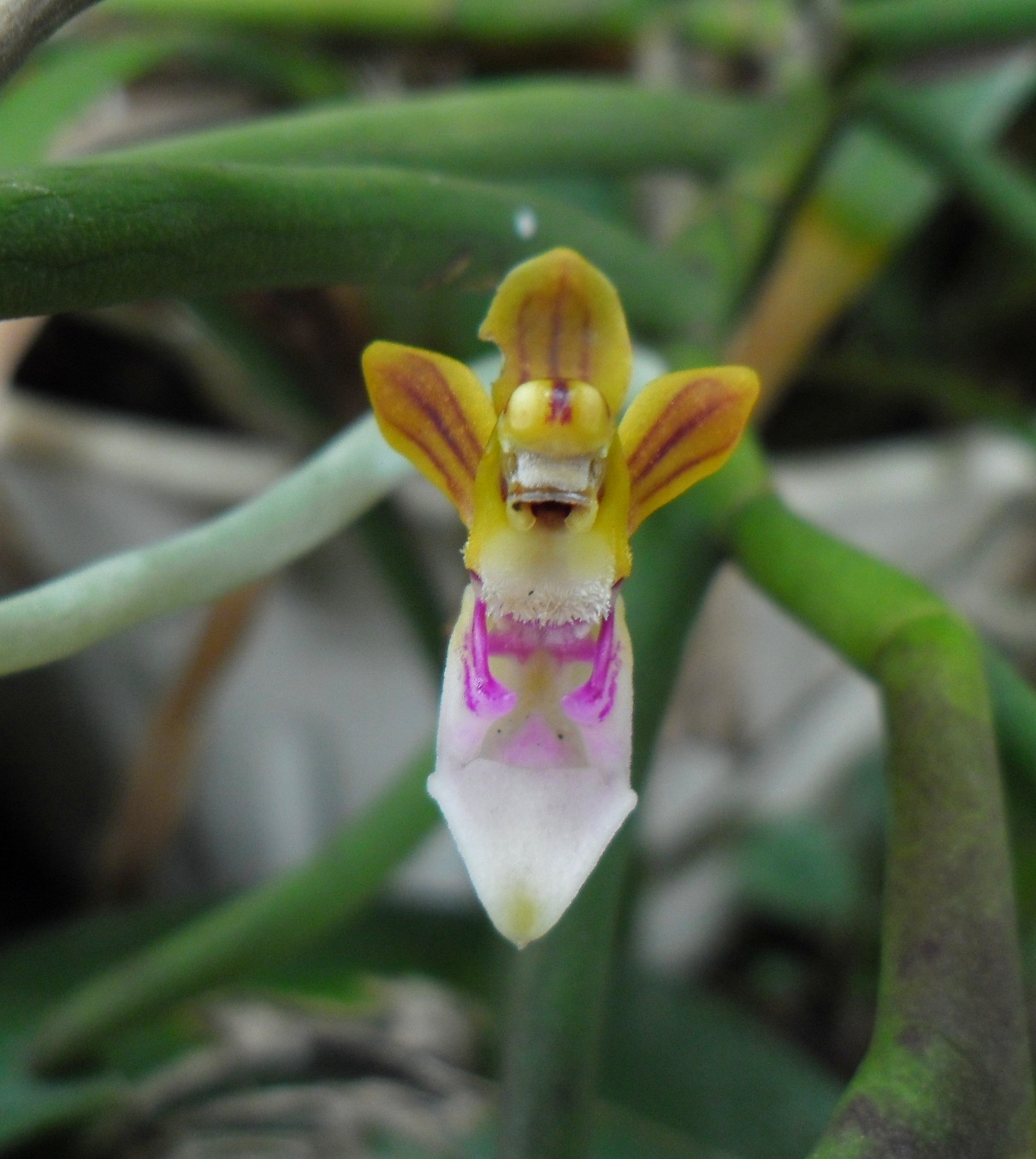
Cleisostoma simondii Orchid Flowers up close.

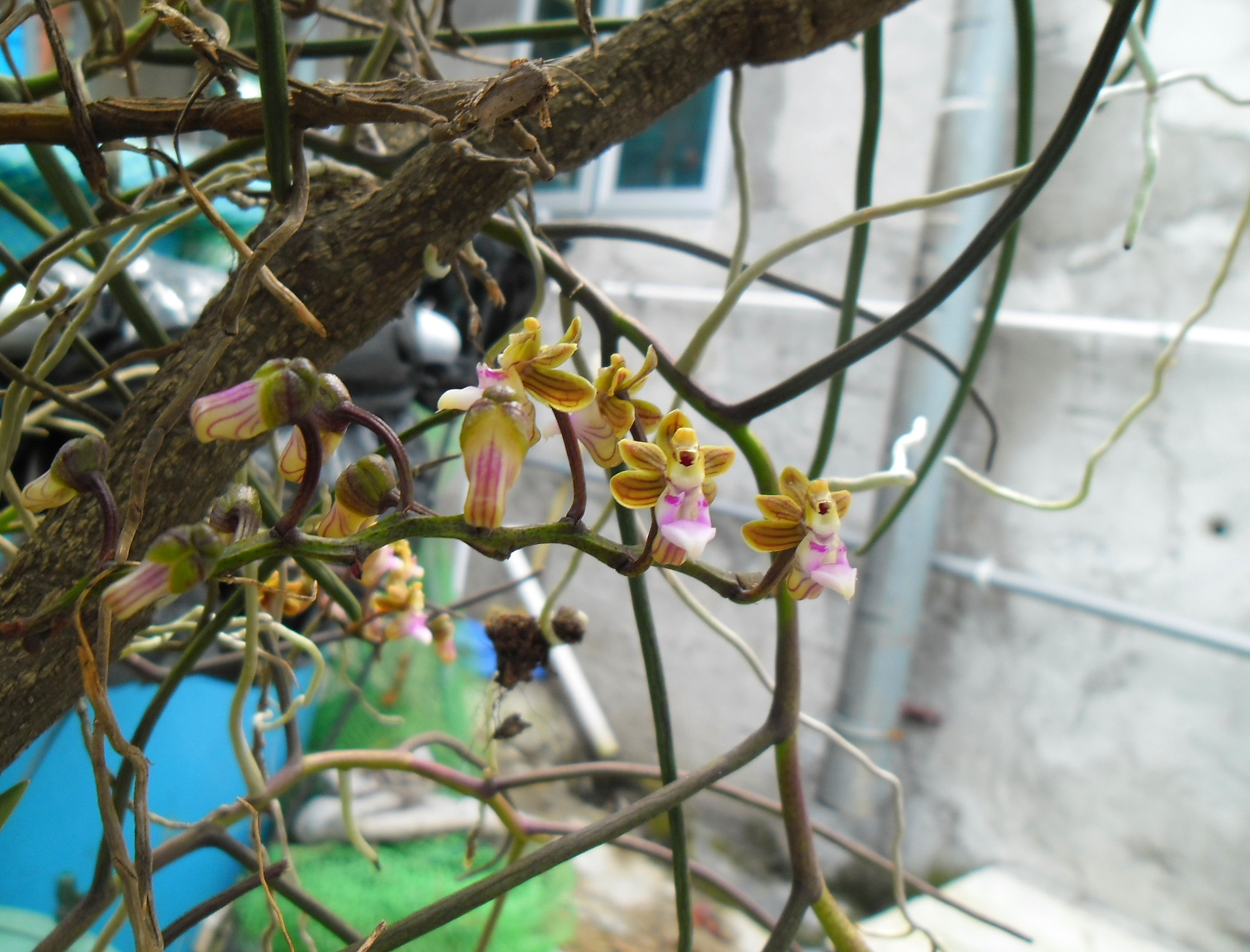
Cleisostoma simondii Orchid flowering.

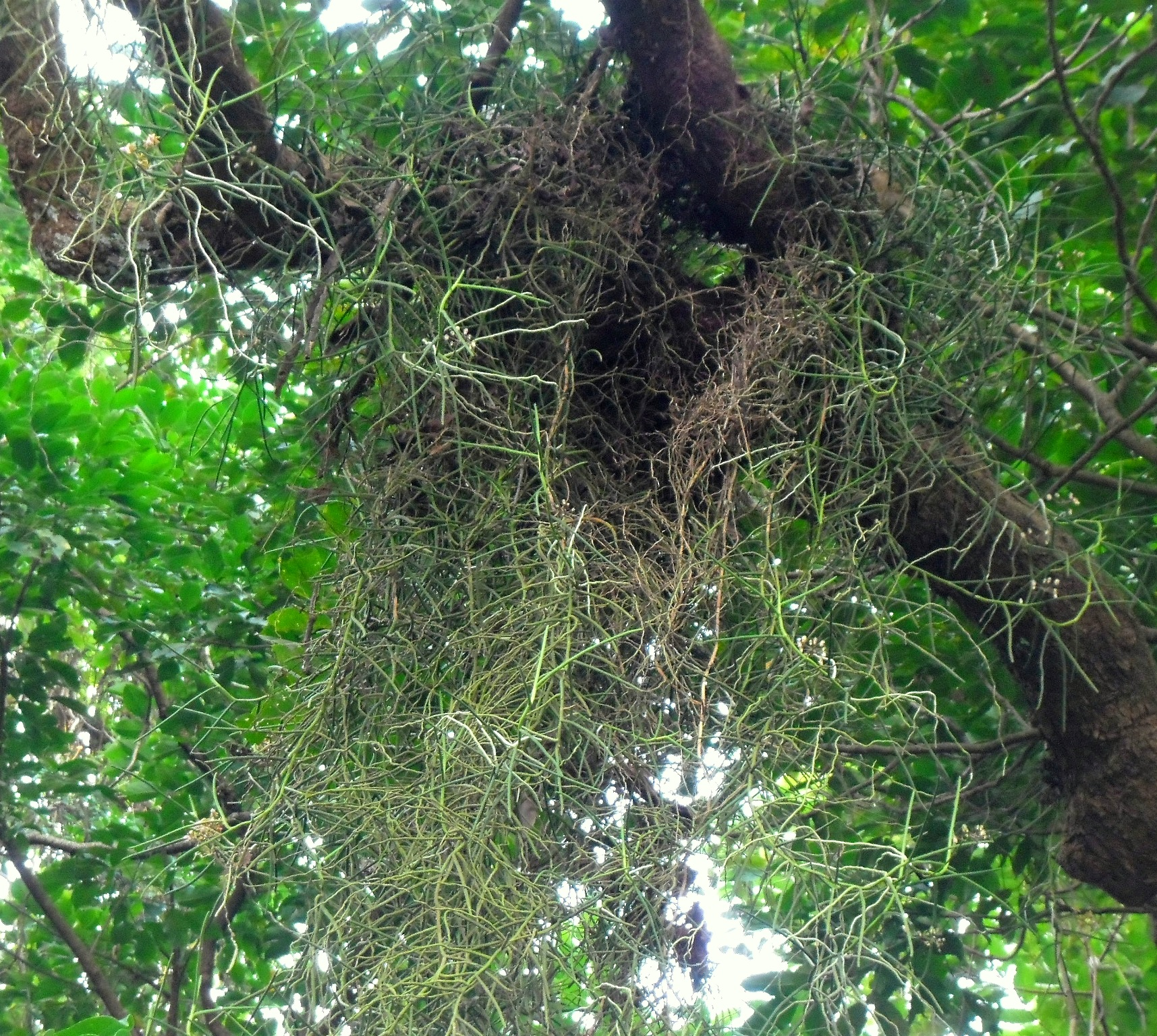
Cleisostoma simondii Orchids growing wild in a massive Clonal colony in Hong Kong, China.

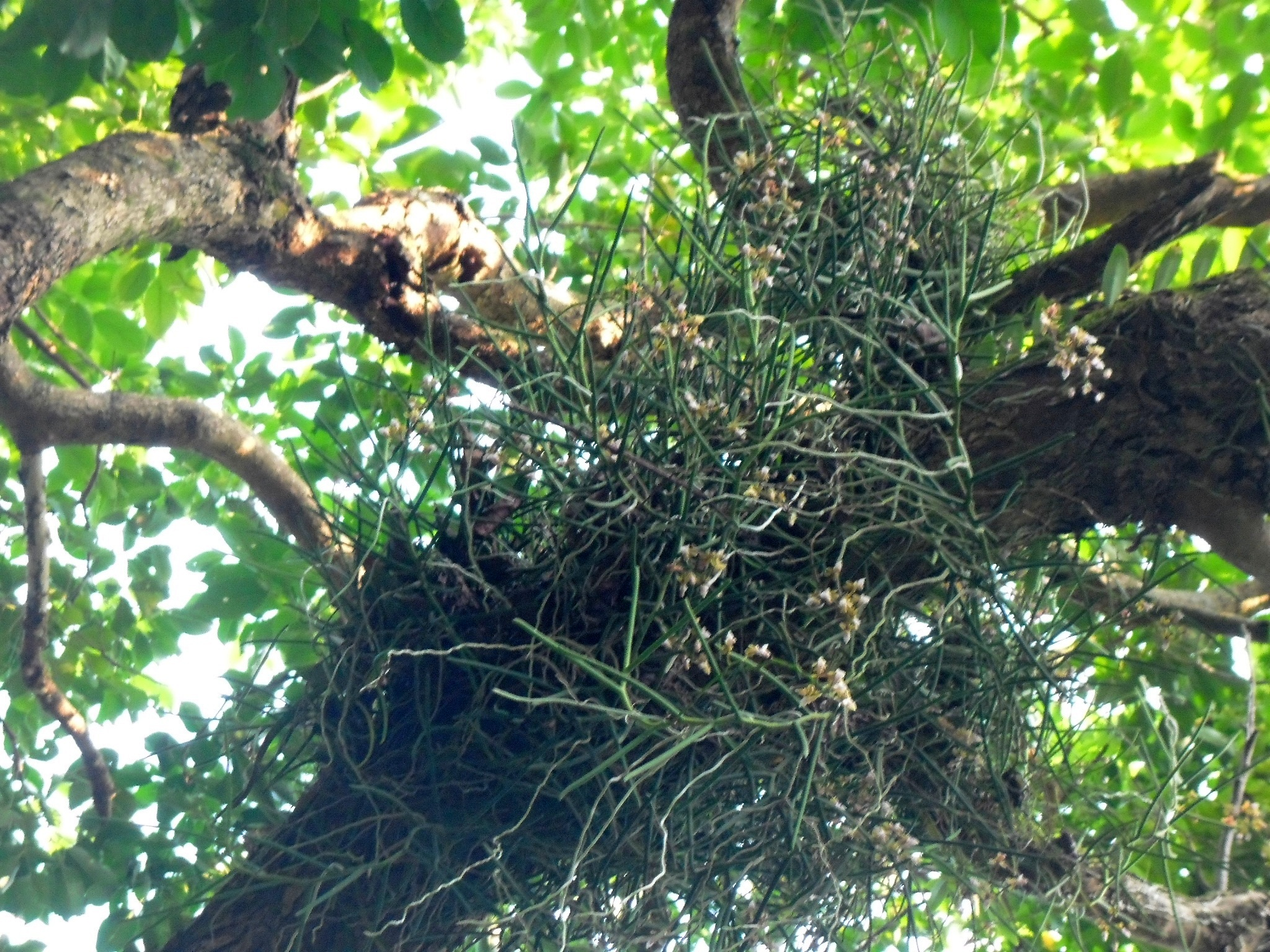
A group of wild Cleisostoma simondii Orchids flowering in a tree branch in Hong Kong.
