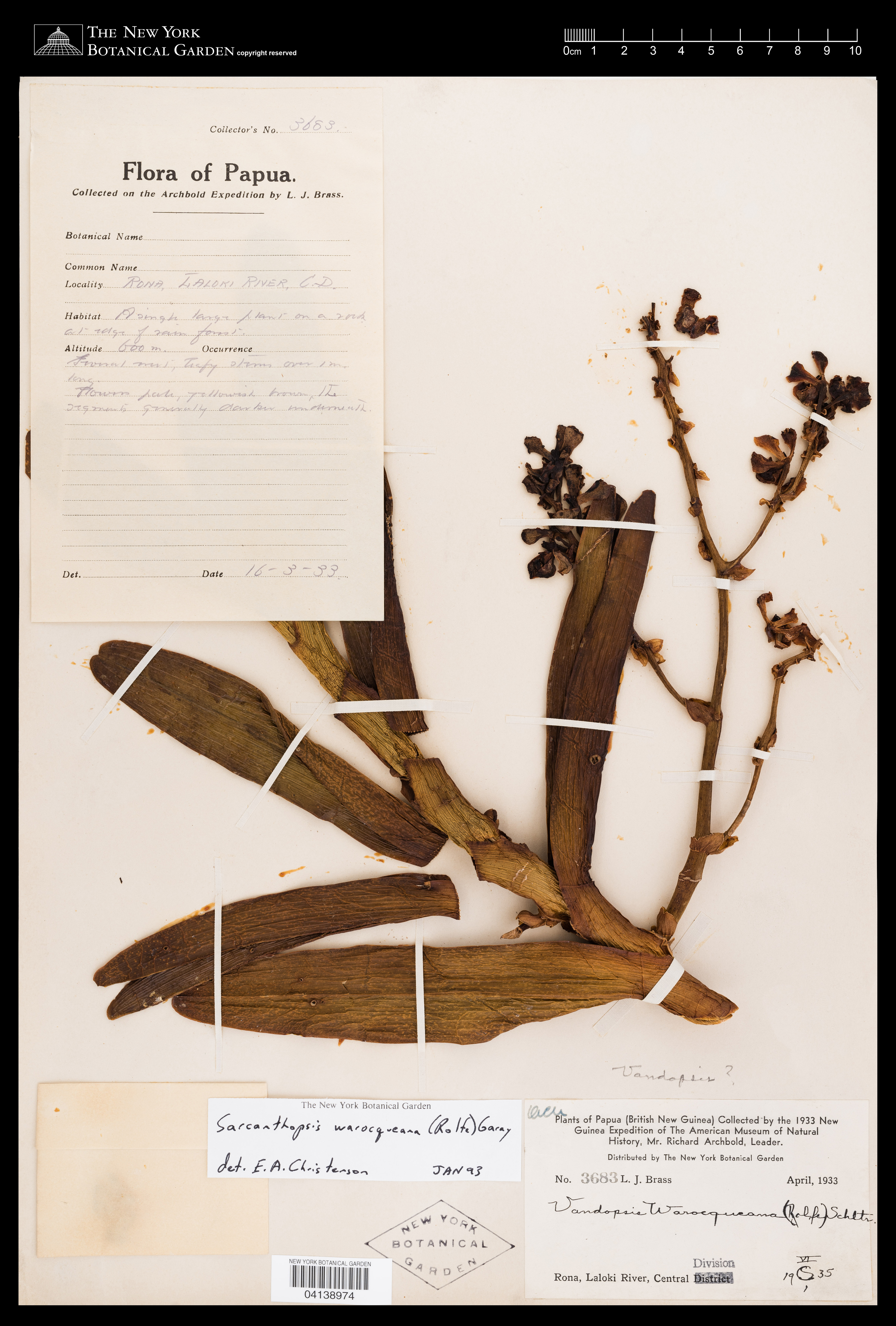

Scientific classification
- Kingdom: Plantae
- Clade: Tracheophytes
- Clade: Angiosperms
- Clade: Monocots
- Order: Asparagales
- Family: Orchidaceae
- Subfamily: Epidendroideae
- Genus: Sarcanthopsis
- Species: S. warocqueana

Binomial name
- Sarcanthopsis warocqueana (Rolfe) Garay

Synonyms
- Cleisostoma hansemanni Kraenzl.; Stauropsis warocqueana Rolfe; Vandopsis warocqueana (Rolfe) Schltr.

= Sarcanthopsis warocqueana =

Species of orchid

Sarcanthopsis warocqueana, commonly known as the goliath orchid, is a large epiphytic or lithophytic orchid from the family Orchidaceae that forms large clumps. It has a long, thick, branched stems, thick, cord-like roots, many leathery, strap-like leaves and many cream-coloured, yellowish or greenish flowers with purple or brown spots. It grows near the sea, in coastal swamps and in rainforest, usually in full sun. It mainly only occurs in New Guinea.

== Description ==
Saccolabiopsis rectifolia is a large epiphytic or lithophytic herb that forms large, straggly clumps and has thick, cord-like roots and thick, branched stems 1–3 metres (3.3–9.8 ft) long. There are many fleshy, strap-like leaves 100–400 millimetres (3.9–16 in) long and 25–70 mm (0.98–2.8 in) wide at intervals about 45 mm (1.8 in) apart. A large number of resupinate cream-coloured, yellowish or greenish flowers with purple or brown spots, 20–30 mm (0.79–1.2 in) long and wide are arranged on a branched flowering stem 150–300 mm (5.9–12 in) long with between five and fifteen flowers on each branch. The sepals are 10–12 mm (0.39–0.47 in) long and 5–7 mm (0.20–0.28 in) wide, the petals a similar width but slightly shorter. The labellum is white with rose-coloured spots, about 8 mm (0.31 in) long and 6 mm (0.24 in) wide three lobes. The side lobes are triangular and the middle lobe is fleshy with a spur and a large, fleshy callus. Flowering occurs from April to August.

== Taxonomy and naming ==
The goliath orchid was first formally described in 1891 by Robert Allen Rolfe who gave it the name Stauropsis warocqueana and published the description in Lindenia: iconography of orchids. In 1972, Leslie Andrew Garay changed the name to Sarcanthopsis warocqueana in The Orchadian. The specific epithet (warocqueana) honours "M. G. Warocqué", in whose garden it flowered, producing the type specimen.

== Distribution and habitat ==
Sarcanthopsis warocqueana grows from rocks on the coast, just above the water line to the branches of trees in rainforest at 1,000 m (3,300 ft) above sea level. It is found in eastern New Guinea and nearby islands. A single juvenile plant has been observed on Moa Island, Queensland.
