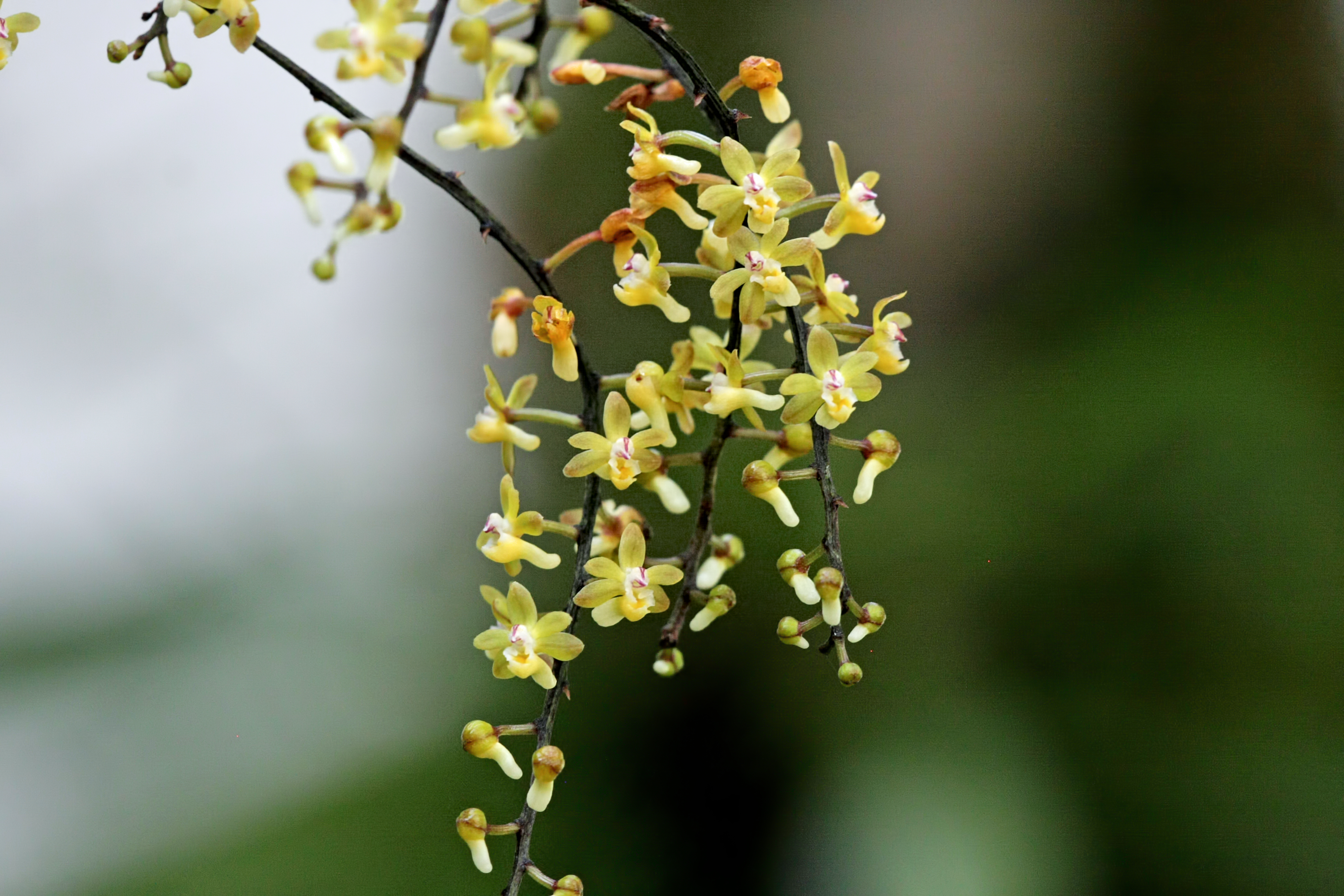

Scientific classification
- Kingdom: Plantae
- Clade: Tracheophytes
- Clade: Angiosperms
- Clade: Monocots
- Order: Asparagales
- Family: Orchidaceae
- Subfamily: Epidendroideae
- Genus: Cleisostoma
- Species: C. aspersum

Binomial name
- Cleisostoma aspersum (Rchb.f.) Garay

= Cleisostoma aspersum =

Species of orchid

Cleisostoma aspersum is a species of orchid found in Bhutan, India, Myanmar, Thailand and Vietnam.
