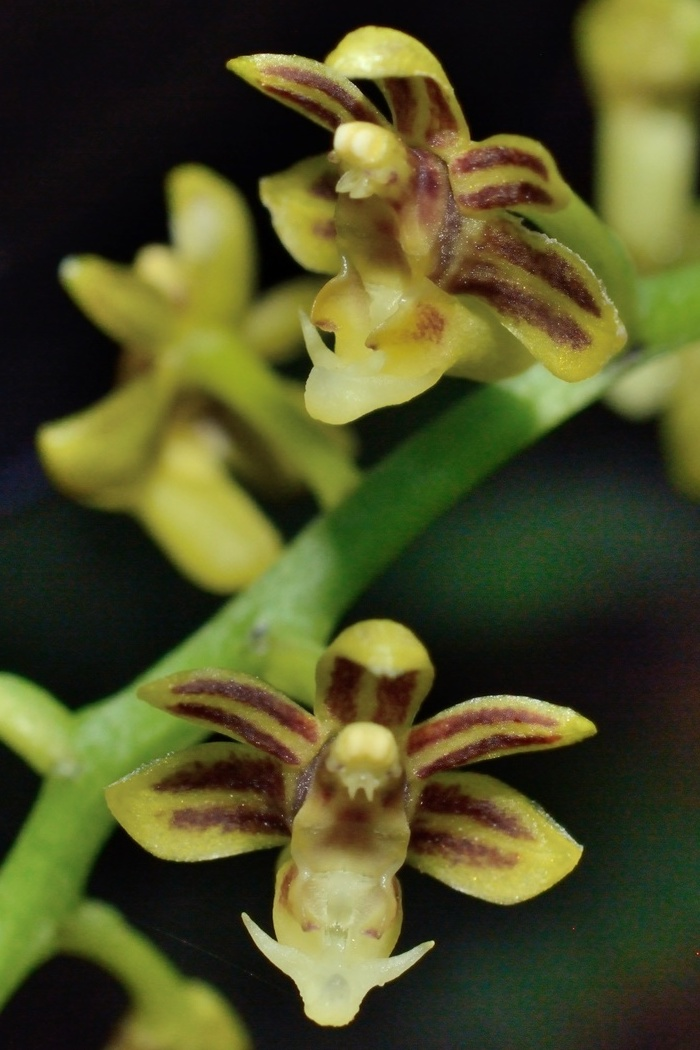
- Detail of Cleisostoma paniculatum flowers
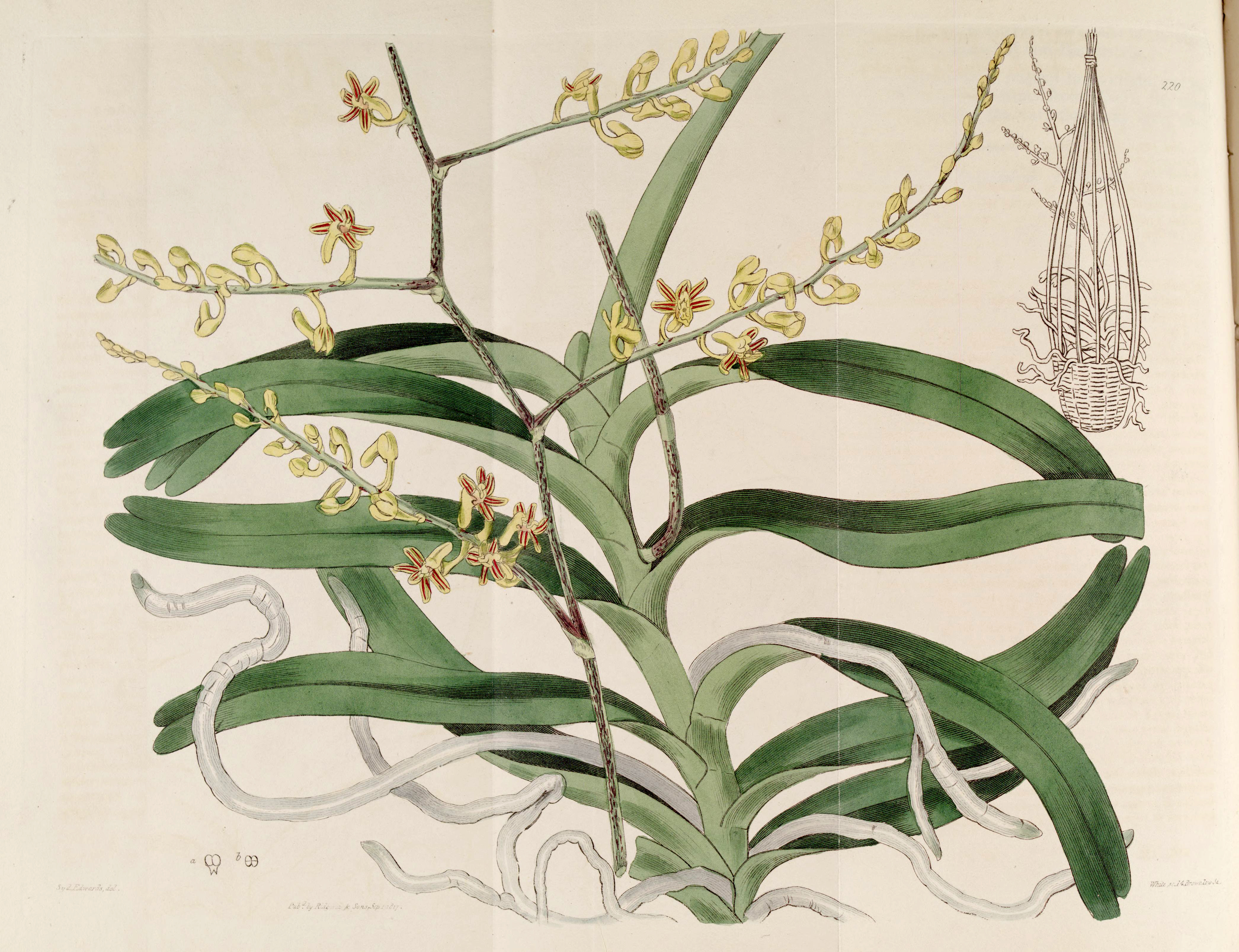
- Cleisostoma paniculatum 1817 illustration from Botanical Register

Scientific classification
- Kingdom: Plantae
- Clade: Tracheophytes
- Clade: Angiosperms
- Clade: Monocots
- Order: Asparagales
- Family: Orchidaceae
- Subfamily: Epidendroideae
- Tribe: Vandeae
- Subtribe: Aeridinae
- Genus: Cleisostoma; Blume (1825)

Type species
- Cleisostoma sagittatum Blume (1825)

Species
- See text

Synonyms
- Carteretia A. Rich.; Echinoglossum Blume; Sarcanthus Lindl.; Garayanthus Szlach.; Raciborskanthos Szlach.; Blumeorchis Szlach.; Ormerodia Szlach.

= Cleisostoma =

Genus of orchids

Cleisostoma is a genus of orchids with approximately 90 accepted species widely distributed through much of the Indian subcontinent, Southeast Asia, China, New Guinea, and some of the islands of the Western Pacific.

The orchid abbreviation is Cleis.

== Selected species ==
- Cleisostoma appendiculatum
- Cleisostoma arietinum
- Cleisostoma aspersum
- Cleisostoma bicorne
- Cleisostome chantaburiense
- Cleisostoma crassifolium
- Cleisostoma crochetii
- Cleisostoma dichroanthum
- Cleisostoma discolor
- Cleisostoma filiforme
- Cleisostoma halophilum
- Cleisostoma longi-folius
- Cleisostoma lowii
- Cleisostoma lecongkietii
- Cleisostoma pachyfolium
- Cleisostoma pachyphyllus
- Cleisostoma pallidus
- Cleisostoma paniculatum
- Cleisostoma parishii
- Cleisostoma pendulata
- Cleisostoma racemiferum
- Cleisostoma ramosum
- Cleisostoma rolfeanum
- Cleisostoma rostratum
- Cleisostoma sagittatum
- Cleisostoma sagittiforme
- Cleisostoma simondii
- Cleisostoma strongyloides
- Cleisostoma subulatum
- Cleisostoma tenuifolium
- Cleisostoma teretifolium
- Cleisostoma termissus
- Cleisostoma tricallosum
- Cleisostoma tridentatus
- Cleisostoma uraiensis
- Cleisostoma williamsoni
