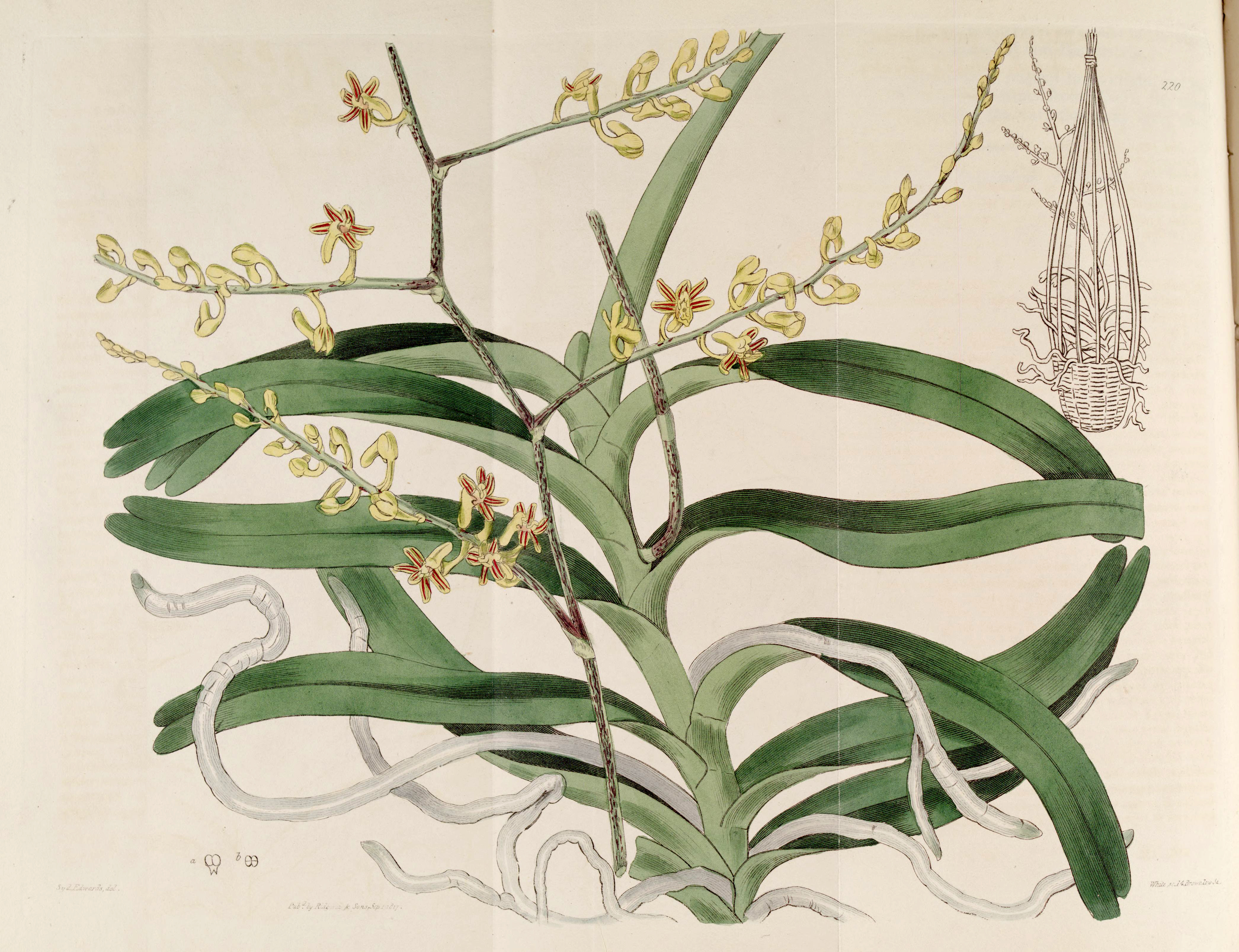
- Cleisostoma paniculatum, 1817 illustration from Botanical Register

Scientific classification
- Kingdom: Plantae
- Clade: Tracheophytes
- Clade: Angiosperms
- Clade: Monocots
- Order: Asparagales
- Family: Orchidaceae
- Subfamily: Epidendroideae
- Genus: Cleisostoma
- Species: C. paniculatum

Binomial name
- Cleisostoma paniculatum (Ker Gawl.) Garay (1972)

Synonyms
- Aerides paniculata Ker Gawl. (1817) (Basionym); Vanda paniculata (Ker Gawl.) R.Br. (1821); Sarcanthus paniculatus (Ker Gawl.) Lindl. (1830); Cleisostoma cerinum Hance (1882); Cleisostoma formosanum Hance (1884); Sarcanthus formosanus (Hance) Rolfe (1896); Sarcanthus cerinus (Hance) Rolfe (1903); Sarcanthus fuscomaculatus Hayata (1914); Sarcanthus uncifer Schltr. (1924); Cleisostoma fuscomaculatum (Hayata) Garay (1972); Cleisostoma unciferum (Schltr.) Garay (1972); Garayanthus paniculatus (Ker Gawl.) Szlach. (1995); Garayanthus fuscomaculatus (Hayata) Szlach. (2003)

= Cleisostoma paniculatum =

Species of orchid

Cleisostoma paniculatum is a species of orchid found in India, Assam, Bhutan, Taiwan, Thailand, Vietnam, and China (Fujian, Guangdong, Guangxi, Hainan, Jiangxi, Sichuan, Tibet).
