= Pelatantheria cristata =

Scientific classification
- Kingdom: Plantae
- Clade: Tracheophytes
- Clade: Angiosperms
- Clade: Monocots
- Order: Asparagales
- Family: Orchidaceae
- Subfamily: Epidendroideae
- Genus: Pelatantheria
- Species: P. cristata

Binomial name
- Pelatantheria cristata (Ridl.) Ridl.

Synonyms
- Cleisostoma cristatum Ridl.

Species of orchid

Pelatantheria cristata is a species of epiphytic or lithophytic orchid occurring in Indonesia, Thailand and Malaysia. It is similar to Pelatantheria insectifera and Pelatantheria rivesii. The stems may reach 20 cm in length and possess deflexed racemes up to 10 cm in length, bearing several flowers. The specific epithet cristata, derived from the Latin word cristatus, refers to the crested or tufted labellum.

== Conservation ==
This species is protected under the Convention on International Trade in Endangered Species of Wild Fauna and Flora CITES and thus is regarded as potentially endangered.
