= Pelatantheria woonchengii =

Scientific classification
- Kingdom: Plantae
- Clade: Tracheophytes
- Clade: Angiosperms
- Clade: Monocots
- Order: Asparagales
- Family: Orchidaceae
- Subfamily: Epidendroideae
- Genus: Pelatantheria
- Species: P. woonchengii

Binomial name
- Pelatantheria woonchengii P.O'Byrne

Species of orchid

Pelatantheria woonchengii is a species of epiphytic or lithophytic orchid occurring in Vietnam, Thailand, Myanmar, and Malaysia. It may be easily misidentified as Pelatantheria ctenoglossum.

== Description ==
The plants are creeping, epiphytic herbs with occasionally branched, slightly compressed, up to 30 cm (12 in) long stems bearing aerial roots. The distichously arranged, fleshy, unequally bi-lobed leaves are channeled along the midvein. One to two yellow flowers with red striations on the sepals and petals are produced on short, axillary racemes, which do not exceed the length of the leaves. The spurred, immobile, three-lobed labellum bears a 2 mm (0.079 in) long apical appendage with tufted hairs. Glandular hairs arise from the base of the column, similar to Pelatantheria bicuspidata and Pelatantheria ctenoglossum. However, Pelatantheria woonchengii only bears one tuft of hairs on each side of the column. Also, the callus on the midlobe is large and yellow and the disk is thickened and cushion-like.

== Ecology ==
Flowering occurs from mid October to late November.

== Conservation ==
This species is protected under the Convention on International Trade in Endangered Species of Wild Fauna and Flora and thus is regarded as potentially endangered. Many wild populations were destroyed by overcollection.
