= Pelatantheria ctenoglossum =

Scientific classification
- Kingdom: Plantae
- Clade: Tracheophytes
- Clade: Angiosperms
- Clade: Monocots
- Order: Asparagales
- Family: Orchidaceae
- Subfamily: Epidendroideae
- Genus: Pelatantheria
- Species: P. ctenoglossum

Binomial name
- Pelatantheria ctenoglossum Ridl.

Synonyms
- Sarcanthus lophochilus Gagnep.; Cleisostoma lophochilum (Gagnep.) Garay

Species of orchid

Pelatantheria ctenoglossum is a species of epiphytic or lithophytic orchid occurring in China, Cambodia, Laos and Vietnam. This species closely resembles Pelatantheria bicuspidata both in its vegetative and generative morphology. It can also be easily confused with Pelatantheria woonchengii. The main difference lies in the morphology of the labellum. The specific epithet "ctenoglossum", meaning "comb tongue", refers to the comb like epergencies of the distal portion of the labellum. The stems are erect and rigid and bear fleshy, lanceolate and unequally bilobed leaves. The sepals are ovate, obtuse and have red striations on a yellow base colour. The labellum is fleshy and three-lobed. The column bears tufted white hairs at its base. The chromosome count is 2n = 38.

== Ecology ==
This species is found in broad-leaved, evergreen forests at 700 m a.s.l. on rocks or tree trunks. Flowering occurs in August.

== Conservation ==
This species is protected under the Convention on International Trade in Endangered Species of Wild Fauna and Flora CITES and thus is regarded as potentially endangered.
