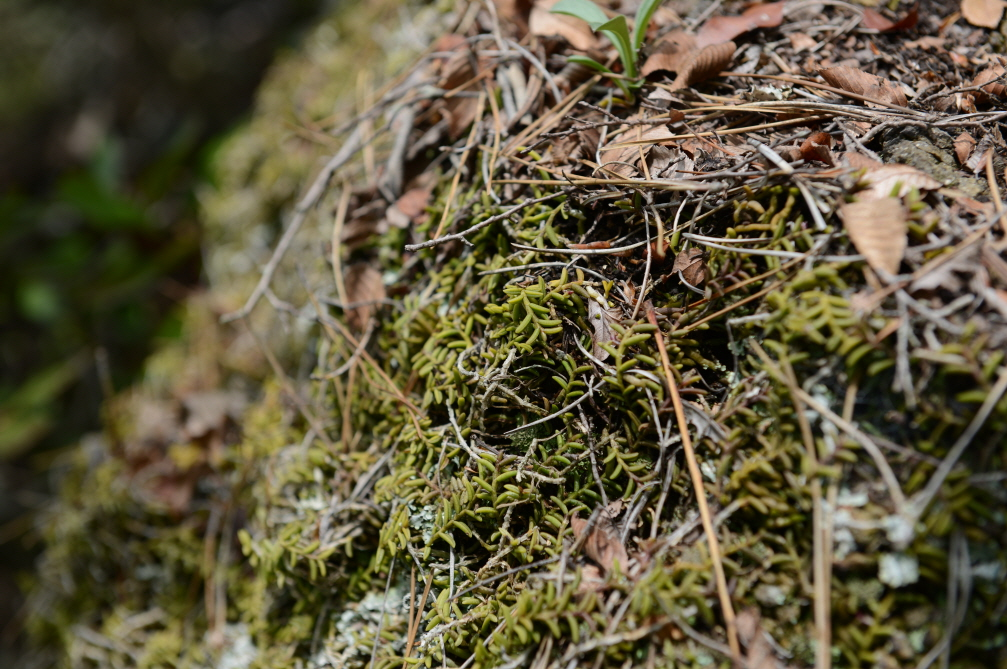

Scientific classification
- Kingdom: Plantae
- Clade: Tracheophytes
- Clade: Angiosperms
- Clade: Monocots
- Order: Asparagales
- Family: Orchidaceae
- Subfamily: Epidendroideae
- Genus: Pelatantheria
- Species: P. scolopendrifolia

Binomial name
- Pelatantheria scolopendrifolia (Makino) Aver.

Synonyms
- Sarcanthus scolopendrifolius Makino; Cleisostoma scolopendrifolium (Makino) Garay

= Pelatantheria scolopendrifolia =

Species of orchid

Pelatantheria scolopendrifolia is a species of epiphytic or lithophytic orchid occurring in China, Japan and Korea. The plants closely adhere to the substrate and are creeping. The commonly branched, very slender stem bears distichously arranged, subcylindrical, leathery leaves. One to two widely opening flowers are produced on a short raceme, which is usually shorter than the leaves. The flowers are thinly textured and pale flesh-coloured. The labellum is spurred.

== Ecology ==
This species if found in forests or shaded areas at 100 to 1000 m a.s.l. on rocks or tree trunks. Flowering occurs in April.

== Conservation ==
This species is protected under the Convention on International Trade in Endangered Species of Wild Fauna and Flora CITES and thus is regarded as potentially endangered. It has suffered a substantial decline of its population and it is vulnerable to loss of genetic diversity and extinction. Asymbiotic seed propagation methods taylored to this species have been developed and may be a vital tool for conservation.
