= Pelatantheria bicuspidata =

Scientific classification
- Kingdom: Plantae
- Clade: Embryophytes
- Clade: Tracheophytes
- Clade: Spermatophytes
- Clade: Angiosperms
- Clade: Monocots
- Order: Asparagales
- Family: Orchidaceae
- Subfamily: Epidendroideae
- Genus: Pelatantheria
- Species: P. bicuspidata

Binomial name
- Pelatantheria bicuspidata (Rolfe ex Downie) Tang & F.T.Wang

Synonyms
- Sarcanthus bicuspidatus Rolfe ex Downie

Species of orchid

Pelatantheria bicuspidata is a species of epiphytic or lithophytic orchid occurring in China and Thailand. This species closely resembles Pelatantheria ctenoglossum and Pelatantheria woonchengii. The specific epithet bicuspidata, derived from the Latin word bicuspidatus, meaning double pointed refers to the two pointed distal portion of the labellum. The stems are elongate, branched and bear elliptic-oblong, unequally bilobed, distichously arranged leaves. The flowers open widely and bear purple or red striations on petals and sepals. The labellum is fleshy, three-lobed and spurred at the base. The column bears tufted white hairs at its base.

== Ecology ==
This species if found in open forests at 800 to 1,400 m (2,600 to 4,600 ft) a.s.l. on rocks or tree trunks. Flowering occurs in June to October.

== Conservation ==
This species is protected under the Convention on International Trade in Endangered Species of Wild Fauna and Flora CITES and thus is regarded as potentially endangered.
