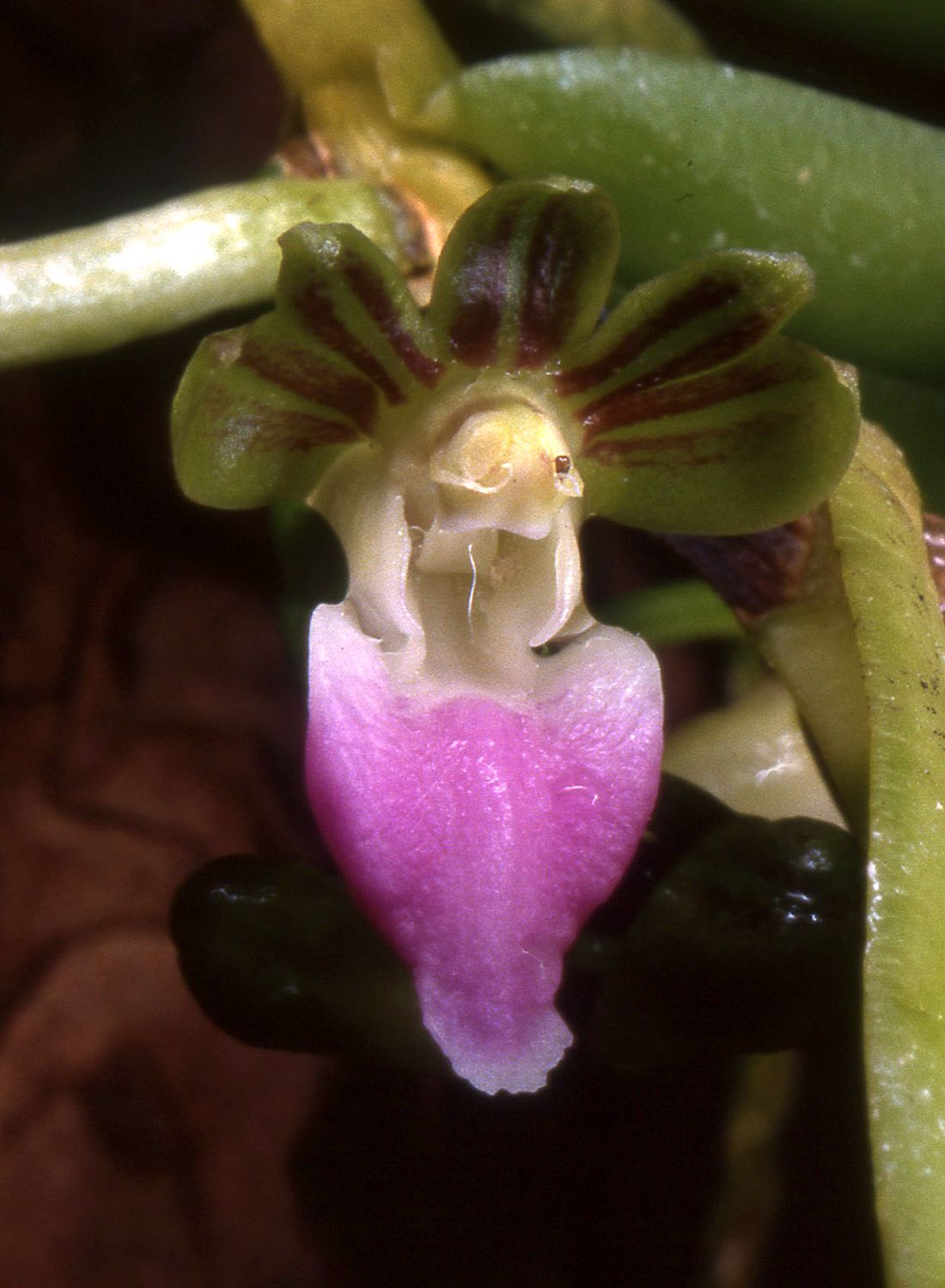
- Pelatantheria insectifera

Scientific classification
- Kingdom: Plantae
- Clade: Tracheophytes
- Clade: Angiosperms
- Clade: Monocots
- Order: Asparagales
- Family: Orchidaceae
- Subfamily: Epidendroideae
- Tribe: Vandeae
- Subtribe: Aeridinae
- Genus: Pelatantheria; Ridl.

= Pelatantheria =

Genus of orchids

Pelatantheria is a genus of flowering plants from the orchid family, Orchidaceae. Its species are distributed across China, Japan, the Indian subcontinent and Southeast Asia.

== Species ==
- Pelatantheria bicuspidata Tang & F.T.Wang - Yunnan, Guizhou, Thailand
- Pelatantheria cristata (Ridl.) Ridl. - Thailand, Malaysia, Sumatra
- Pelatantheria ctenoglossum Ridl. - Yunnan, Indochina
- Pelatantheria eakroensis Haager - Vietnam
- Pelatantheria insectifera (Rchb.f.) Ridl. - Assam, Bangladesh, India, Nepal, Bhutan, Andaman Islands, Myanmar, Thailand, Vietnam
- Pelatantheria rivesii (Guillaumin) Tang & F.T.Wang - Yunnan, Guangxi, Laos, Vietnam
- Pelatantheria scolopendrifolia (Makino) Aver. - Japan, Korea, Anhui, Fujian, Jiangsu, Shandong, Sichuan, Zhejiang
- Pelatantheria woonchengii P.O'Byrne - Thailand

== Cultivation ==
Pelatantheria is not commonly found in cultivation and this genus is rarely used in hybridisation. As of February 2022, 11 hybrids have been registered in the International Orchid Register of the Royal Horticultural Society.

== See also ==
- List of Orchidaceae genera
