= Pelatantheria eakroensis =

Scientific classification
- Kingdom: Plantae
- Clade: Tracheophytes
- Clade: Angiosperms
- Clade: Monocots
- Order: Asparagales
- Family: Orchidaceae
- Subfamily: Epidendroideae
- Genus: Pelatantheria
- Species: P. eakroensis

Binomial name
- Pelatantheria eakroensis Haager

Species of orchid

Pelatantheria eakroensis is a species of epiphytic or lithophytic orchid occurring in Vietnam. The plants are endemic to southern Vietnam.

== Ecology ==
They are found under dry conditions in southern Vietnamese dry lowland Dipterocarp forests and have obvious xeromorphic features. This species is very rare, and considered endangered. It is found on silicate and thus commonly acidic basement rock at elevations of 0 to 800 m a.s.l on other plants. Lithophytic growth has not been reported.

== Conservation ==
This species is protected under the Convention on International Trade in Endangered Species of Wild Fauna and Flora CITES and thus is regarded as potentially endangered.
