= Pelatantheria rivesii =

Scientific classification
- Kingdom: Plantae
- Clade: Tracheophytes
- Clade: Angiosperms
- Clade: Monocots
- Order: Asparagales
- Family: Orchidaceae
- Subfamily: Epidendroideae
- Genus: Pelatantheria
- Species: P. rivesii

Binomial name
- Pelatantheria rivesii (Guillaumin) Tang & F.T.Wang

Synonyms
- Sarcanthus rivesii Guillaumin; Sarcanthus tonkinensis Guillaumin; Cleisostoma thomatoglossum Guillaumin

Species of orchid

Pelatantheria rivesii is a species of epiphytic or lithophytic orchid occurring in China, Laos and Vietnam. This species closely resembles Pelatantheria insectifera bothin its vegetative and generative morphology. The commonly branched stems may reach lengths of 1 m and diameters of 7 mm. Few flowers are produced during October on short racemes, which do not exceed the length of the leaves. The flowers are small and fleshy and the sepals and petals are pale yellow and bear striped. The labellum is pink.

== Ecology ==
This species if found in broad-leaved, evergreen forests at 700 to 1100 m a.s.l. on rocks or tree trunks. Occasionally they were found along river banks.

== Conservation ==
This species is protected under the Convention on International Trade in Endangered Species of Wild Fauna and Flora CITES and thus is regarded as potentially endangered.
