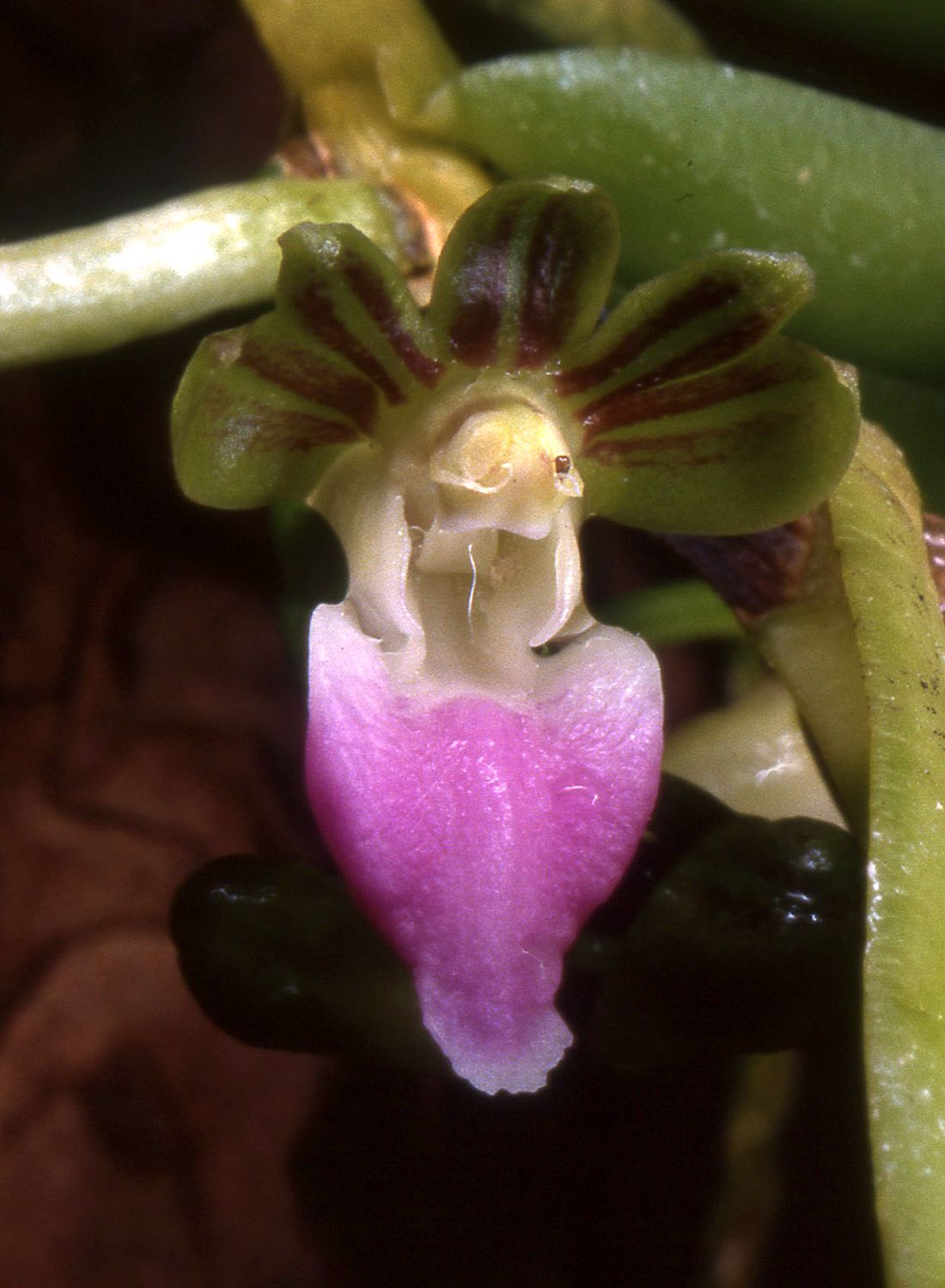
- Flower of Pelatantheria insectifera

Scientific classification
- Kingdom: Plantae
- Clade: Tracheophytes
- Clade: Angiosperms
- Clade: Monocots
- Order: Asparagales
- Family: Orchidaceae
- Subfamily: Epidendroideae
- Genus: Pelatantheria
- Species: P. insectifera

Binomial name
- Pelatantheria insectifera Rchb.f.

Synonyms
- Sarcanthus insectifer (Rchb.f.)

= Pelatantheria insectifera =

Species of orchid

Pelatantheria insectifera is a species of orchid occurring in Thailand, Laos, India. The species is a long-stemmed (30 to 60 cm) epiphytic herb. The small flowers have a relatively large, fleshy, bright pink labellum. The specific epithet "insectifera", meaning "insect bearing", refers to the flowers, which are indicated to resemble an insect. Thus, attraction of pollinators by means of sexual deception is implied, but to date no pollinator has been published. The flowers are produced from September to October on subsessile racemes, which are shorter than the leaves. The plants are almost entirely self-incompatible, but a small percentage of self-pollination events may be successful. After pollination the colour of the labellum changes from pink to red and the sepals and petals begin to close.

== Ecology ==
This species if found in dry or moist, evergreen or deciduous, open or dense forests on limestone. It may grow epiphytically or lithophytically at elevations of 600 to 1100 m a.s.l. It is often found in association with other epiphytic orchids, such as Dendrobium, Eria and Pholidota.

== Conservation ==
This species is protected under the Convention on International Trade in Endangered Species of Wild Fauna and Flora CITES and thus is regarded as potentially endangered. The export of specimens collected from the wild is prohibited, but artificially propagated plants may be sold, as long as CITES regulations are followed. Production of artificially propagated plants can reduce poaching by satisfying market demand through artificially propagated plants. The propagated plants may be also be re-introduced to the wild. For proper ex-situ conservation, plants in cultivation should reflect the variability of natural populations and should not be hybridised.

Images

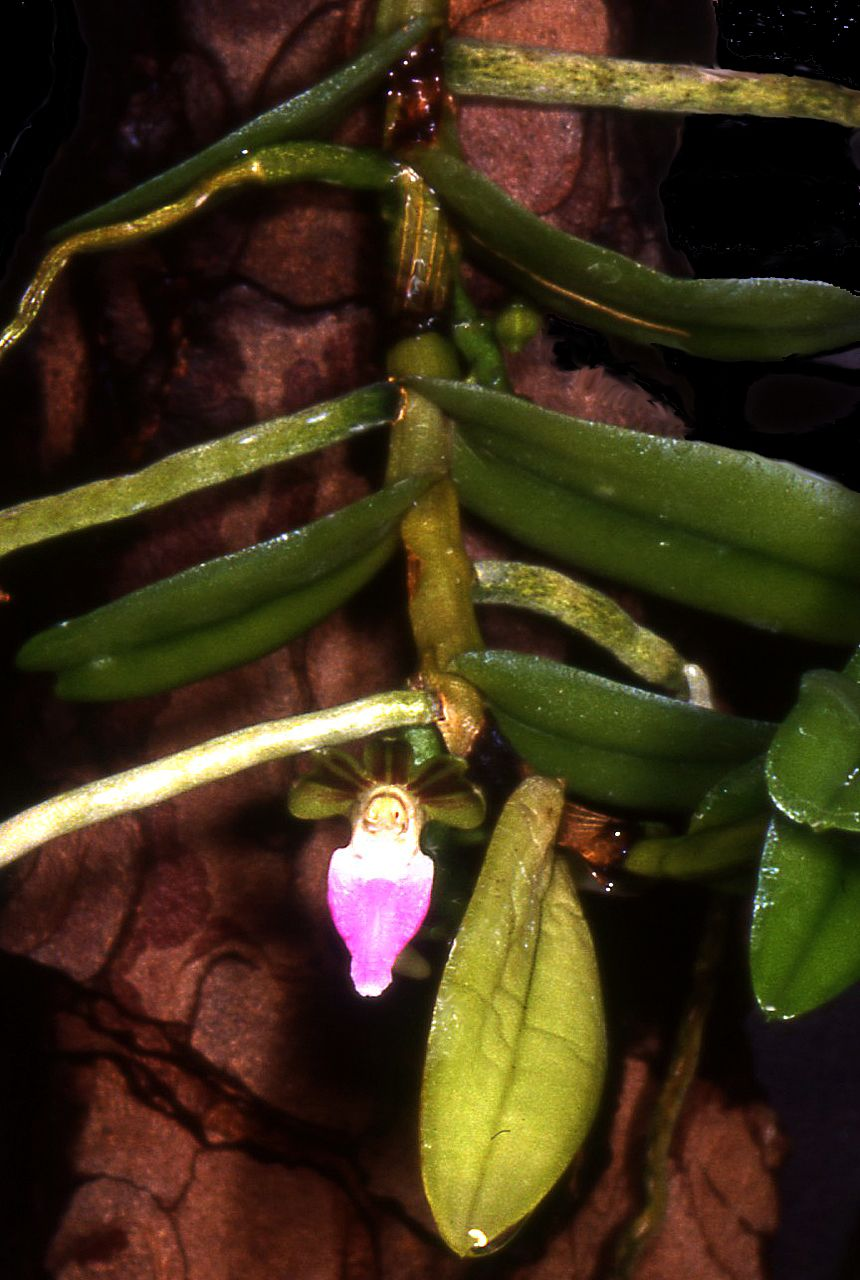

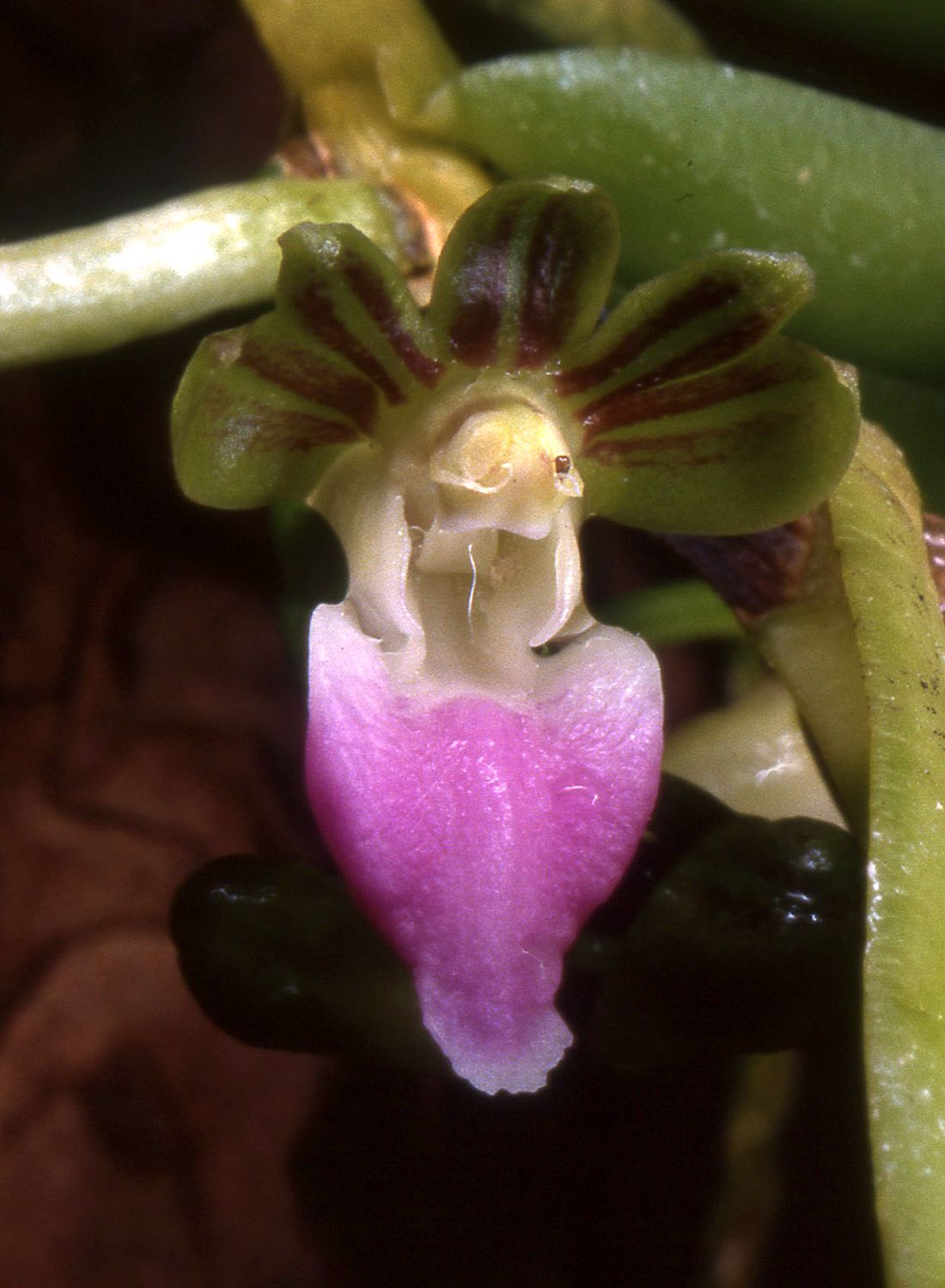

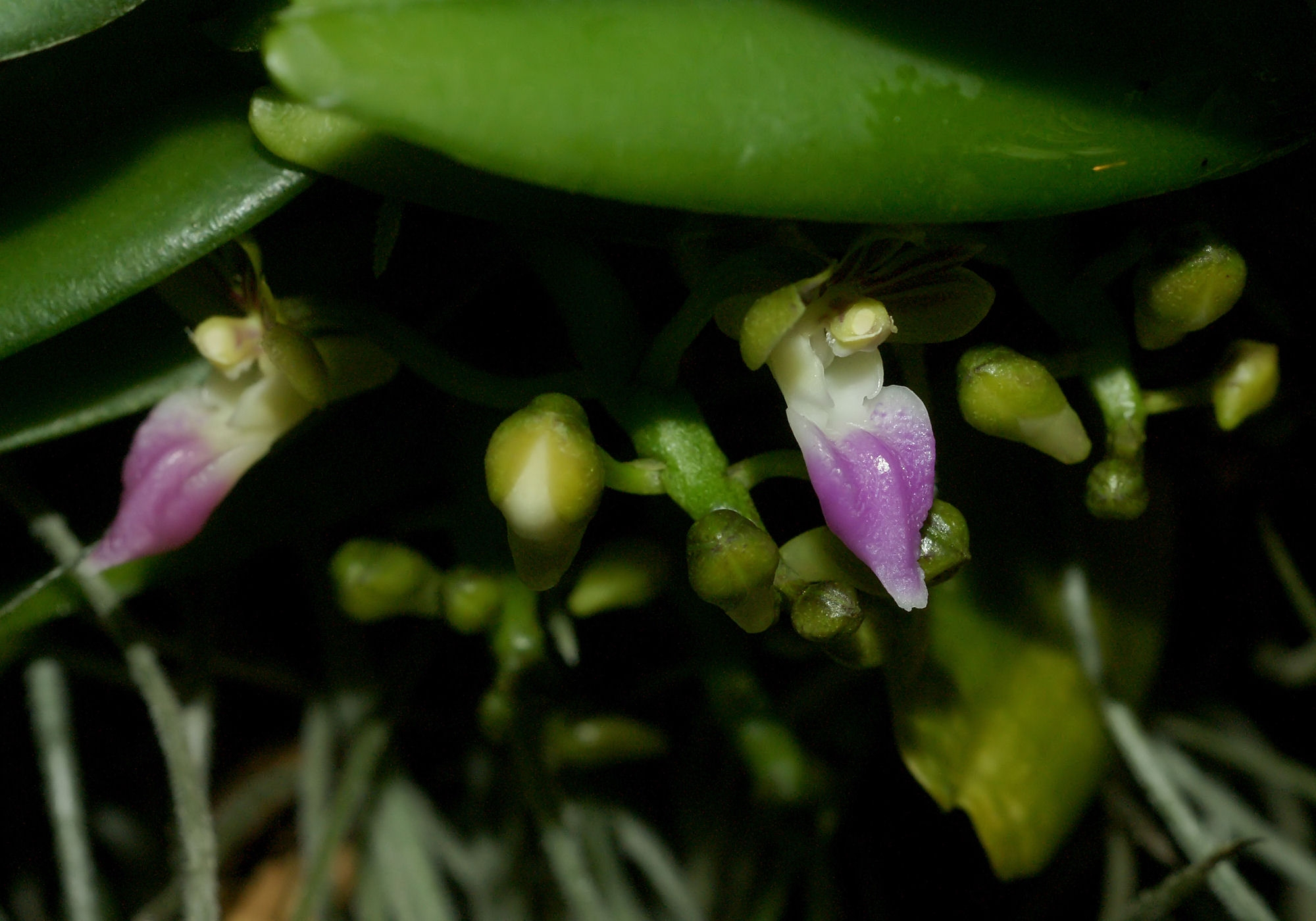

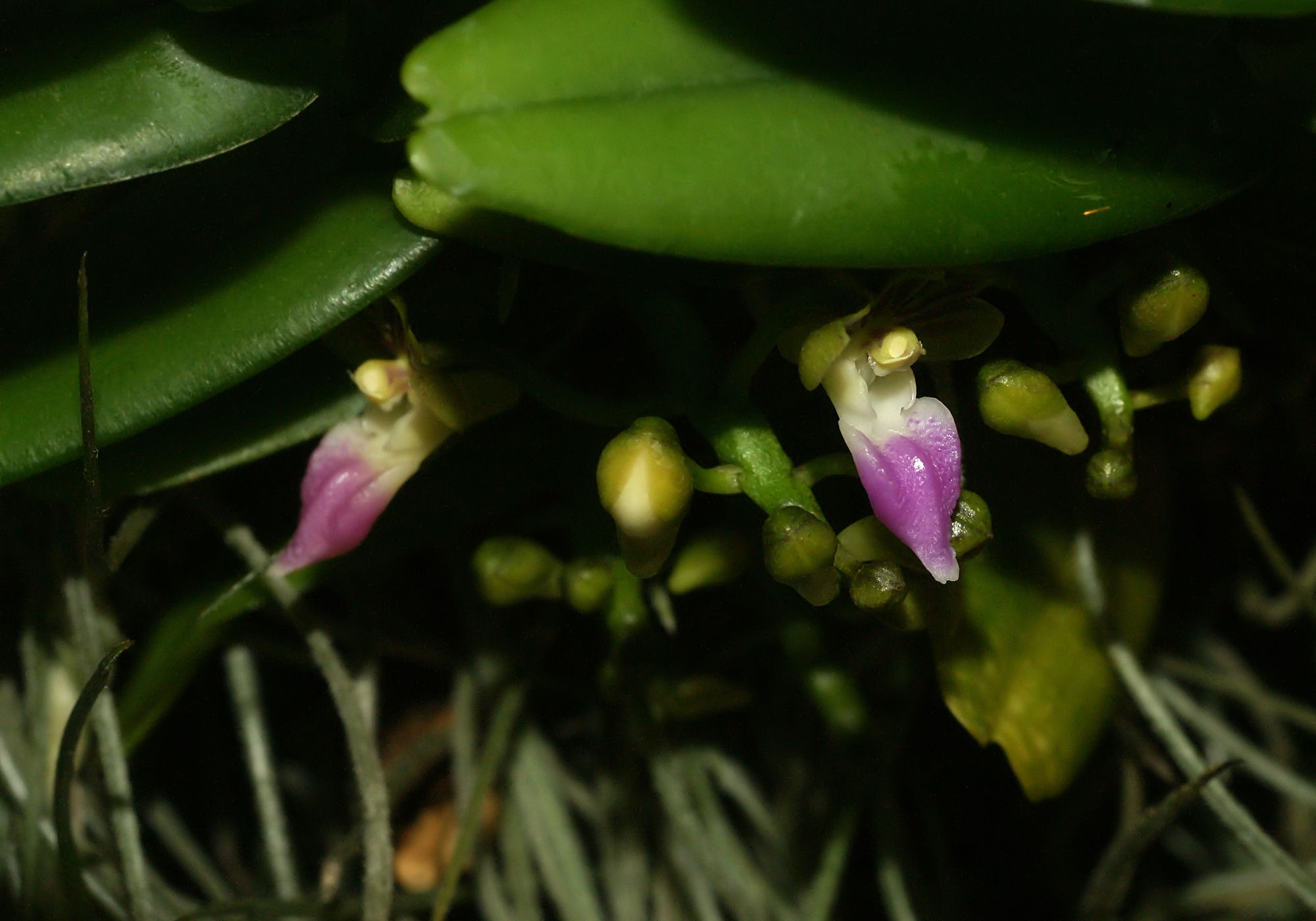

plant exhibiting post-pollination changes

longitudinal cut of flower
