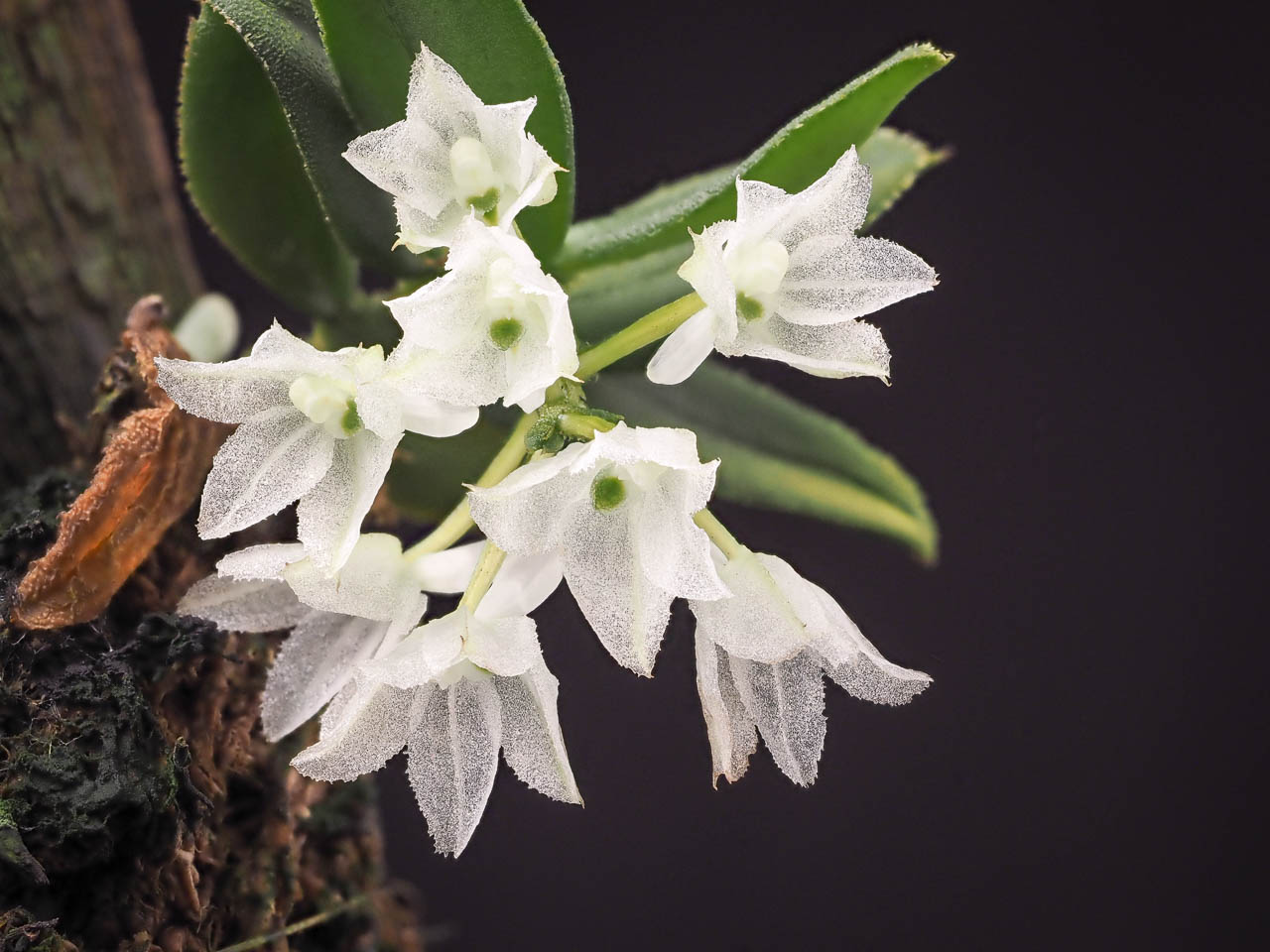
- Flowering Hymenorchis javanica specimen in cultivation
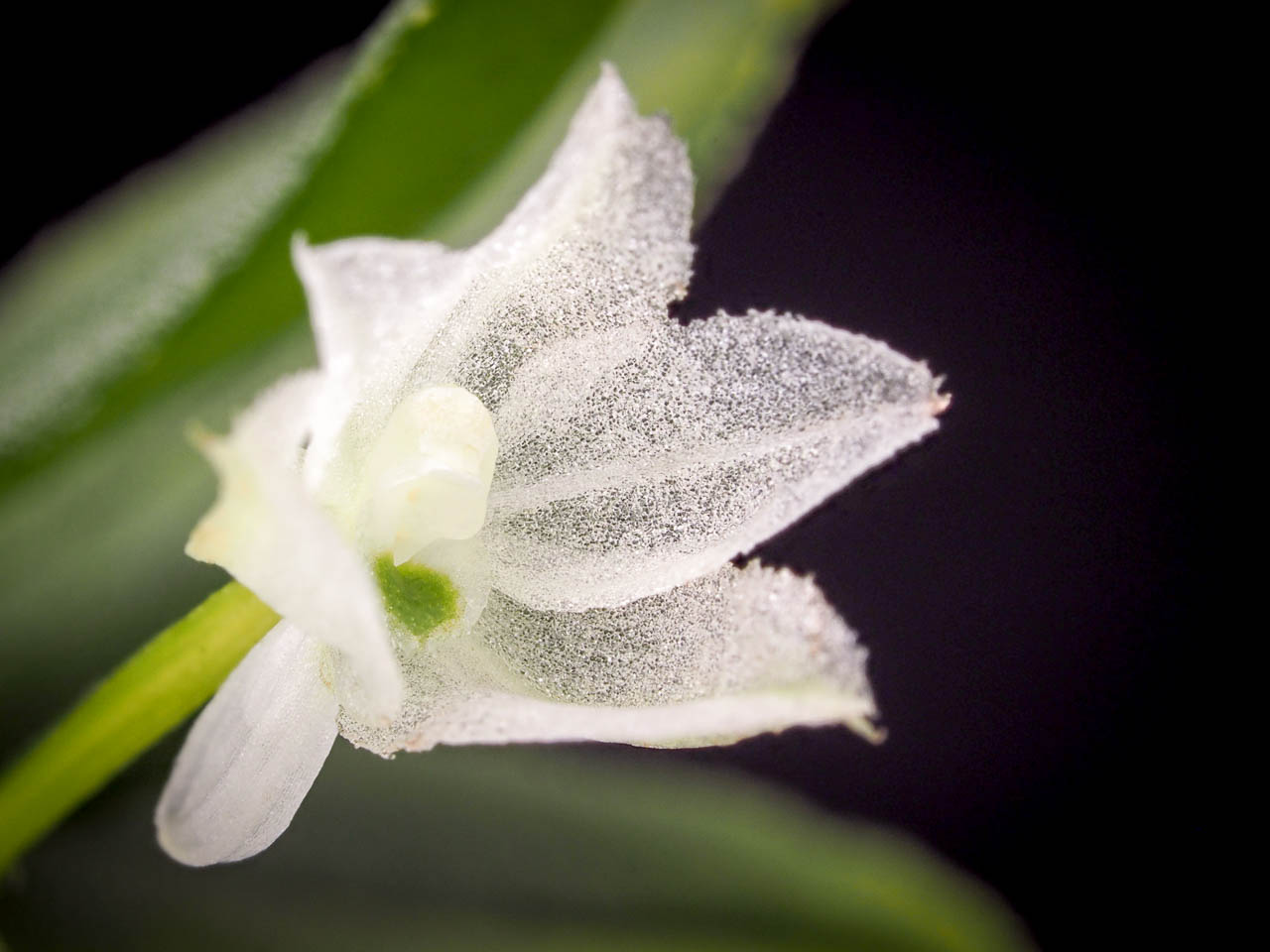
- Detail of Hymenorchis javanica flower

Scientific classification
- Kingdom: Plantae
- Clade: Tracheophytes
- Clade: Angiosperms
- Clade: Monocots
- Order: Asparagales
- Family: Orchidaceae
- Subfamily: Epidendroideae
- Genus: Hymenorchis
- Species: H. javanica

Binomial name
- Hymenorchis javanica (Teijsm. & Binn.) Schltr.

Synonyms
- Oeceoclades javanica Teijsm. & Binn.; Saccolabium javanicum (Teijsm. & Binn.) J.J.Sm.

= Hymenorchis javanica =

Species of orchid

Hymenorchis javanica is an epiphytic orchid native to the Indonesian island Java and peninsular Malaysia. It was thought to be endemic to the island of Java, which is indicated by the specific epithet, but other populations have been found in Gunung Ulu Kali, Malaysia.

== Description ==
It is mostly monopodial but lateral branching does occur occasionally. The inflorescences are short and unbranched. The flowers are small, white and have a green spot in the center of the labellum. The petals are very thin and translucent.

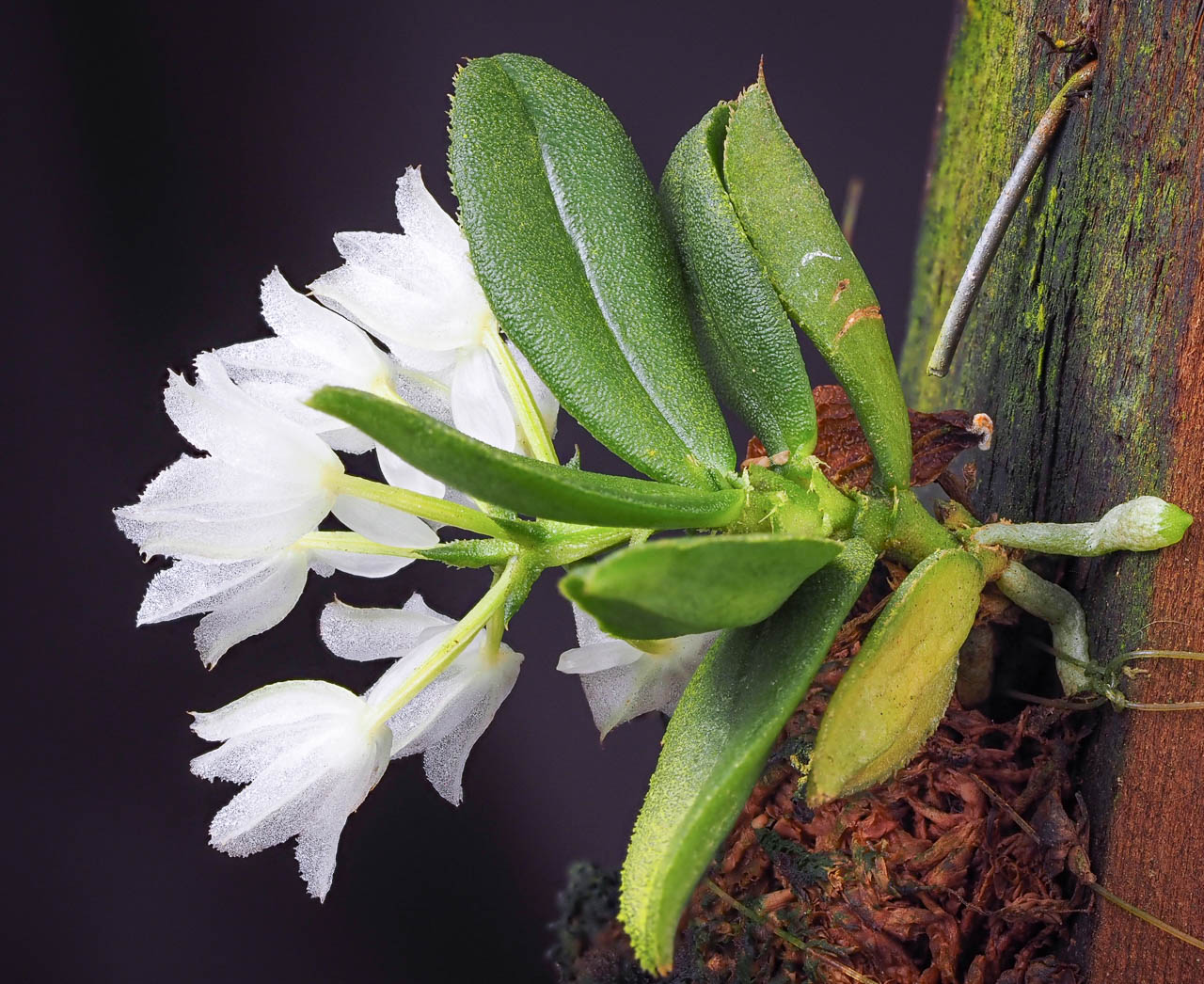
Flowering Hymenorchis javanica specimen in cultivation

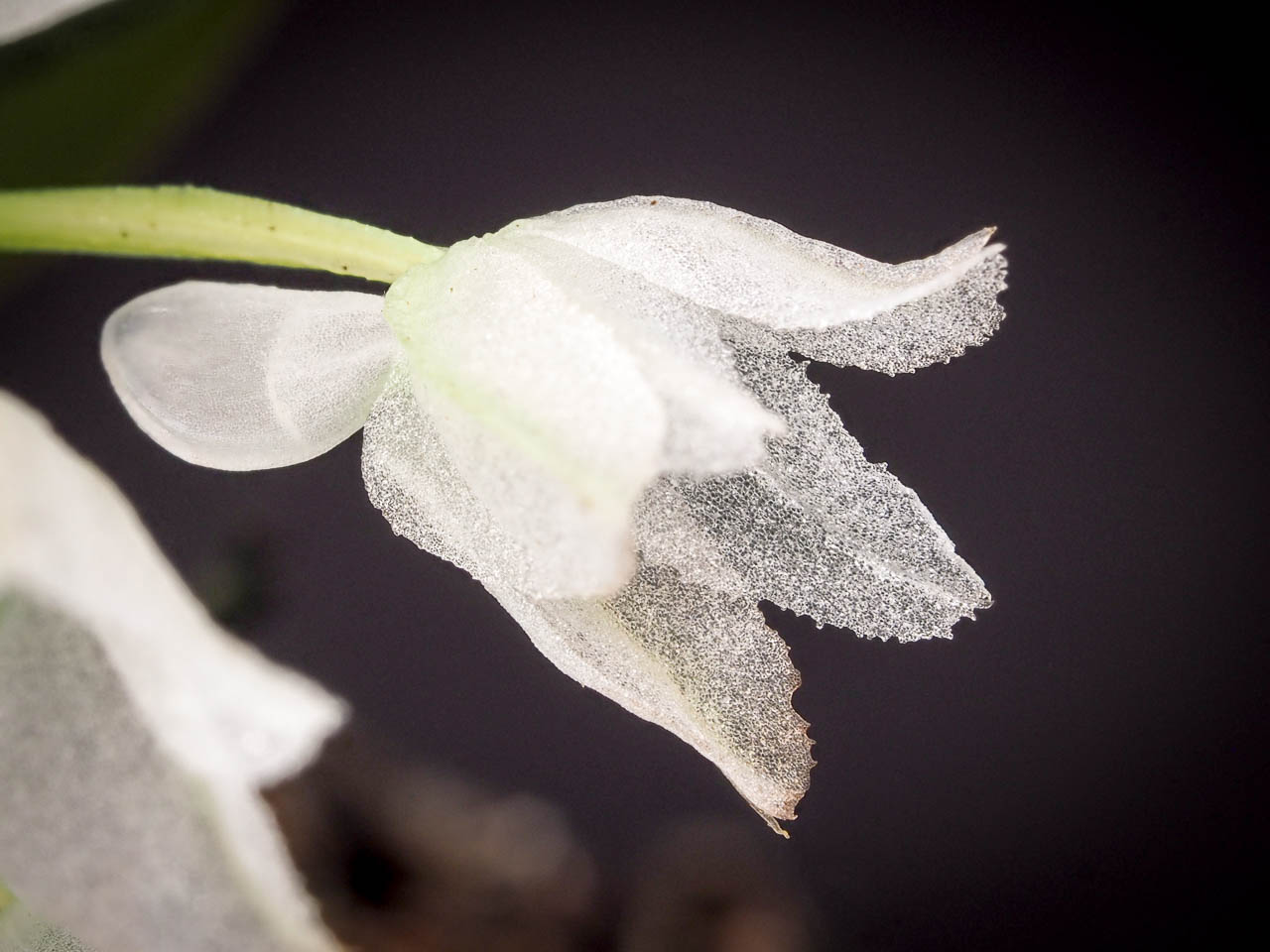
Side view of Hymenorchis javanica flower

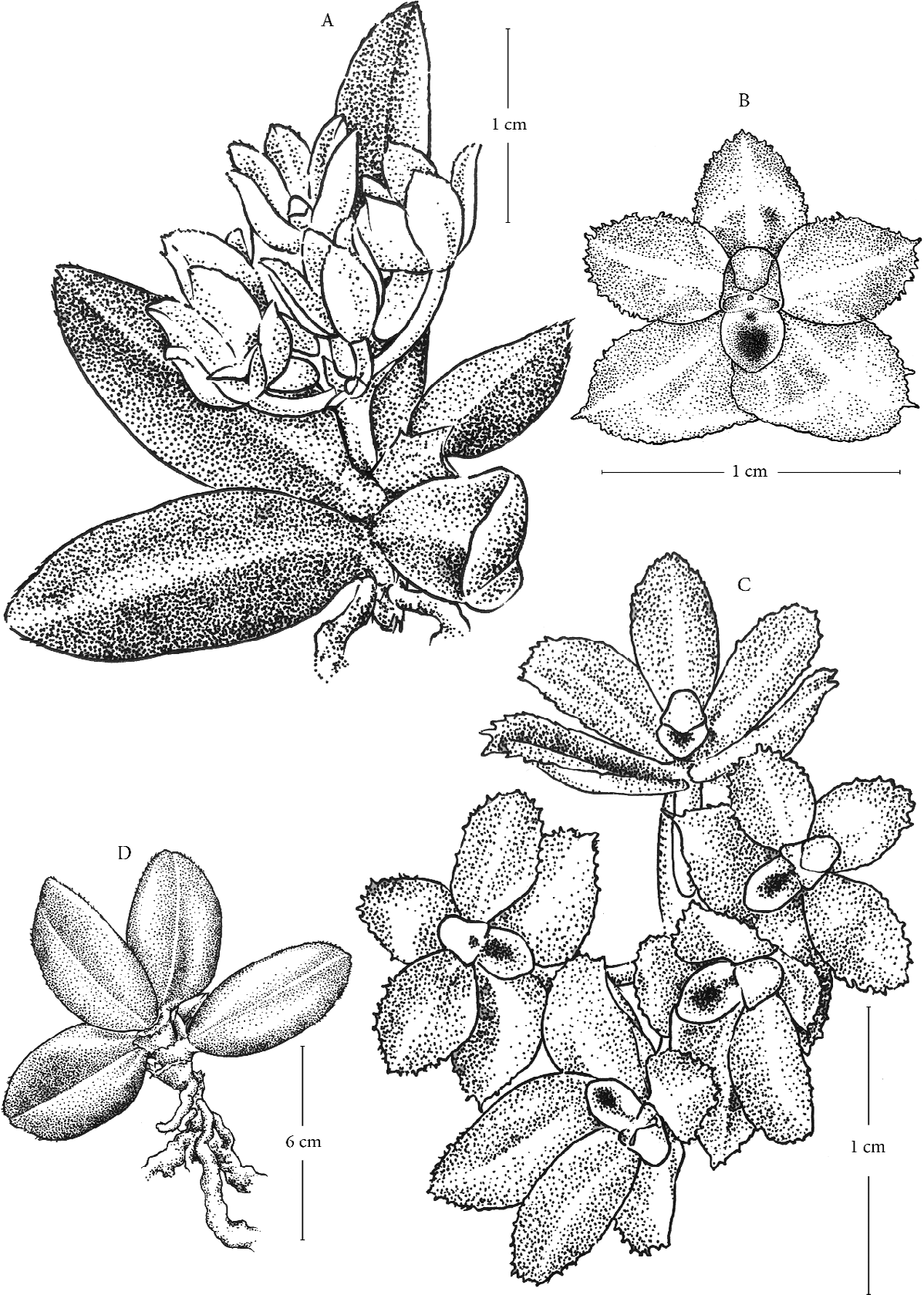
Botanical illustration of Hymenorchis javanica

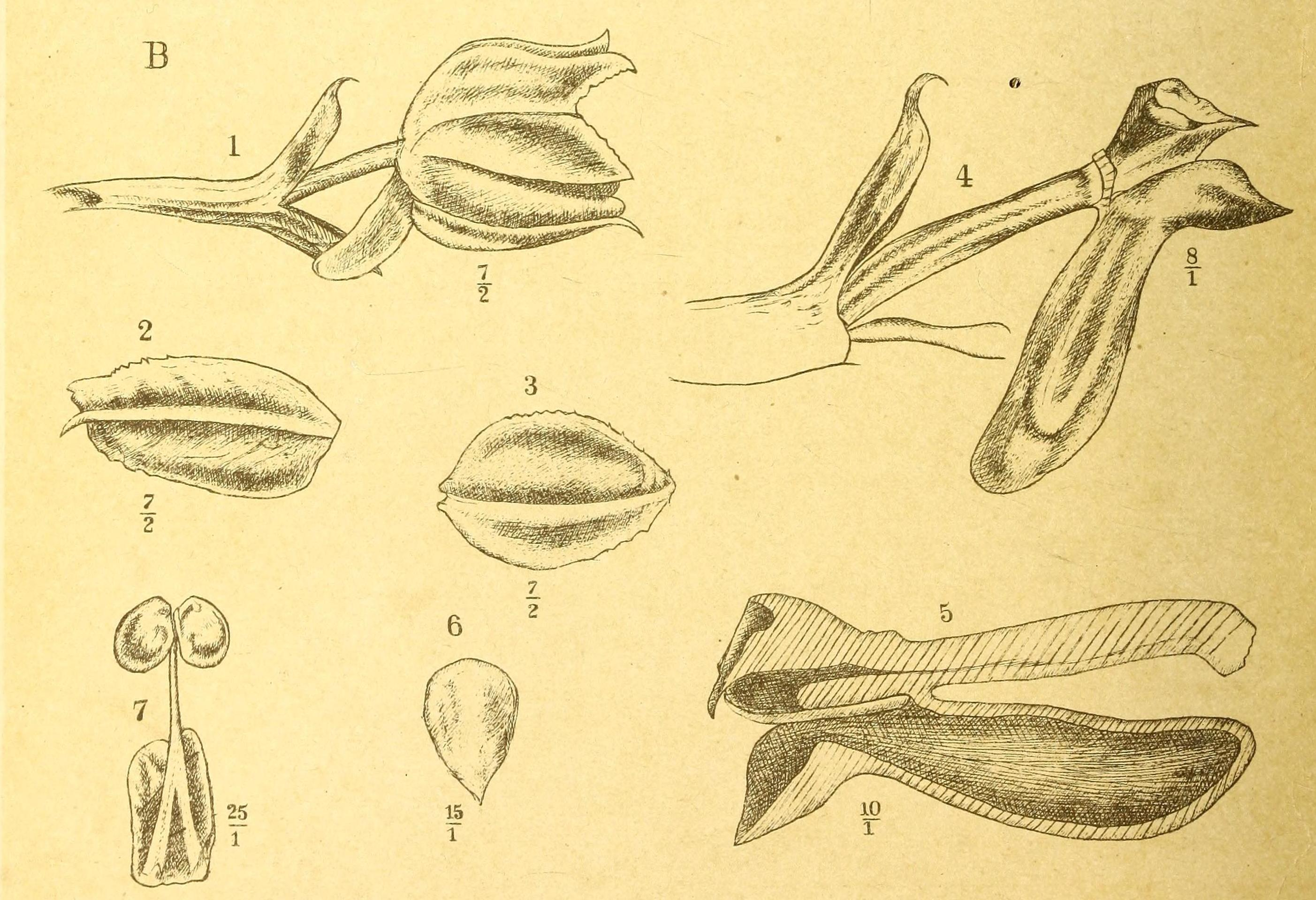
Botanical illustration of Hymenorchis javanica

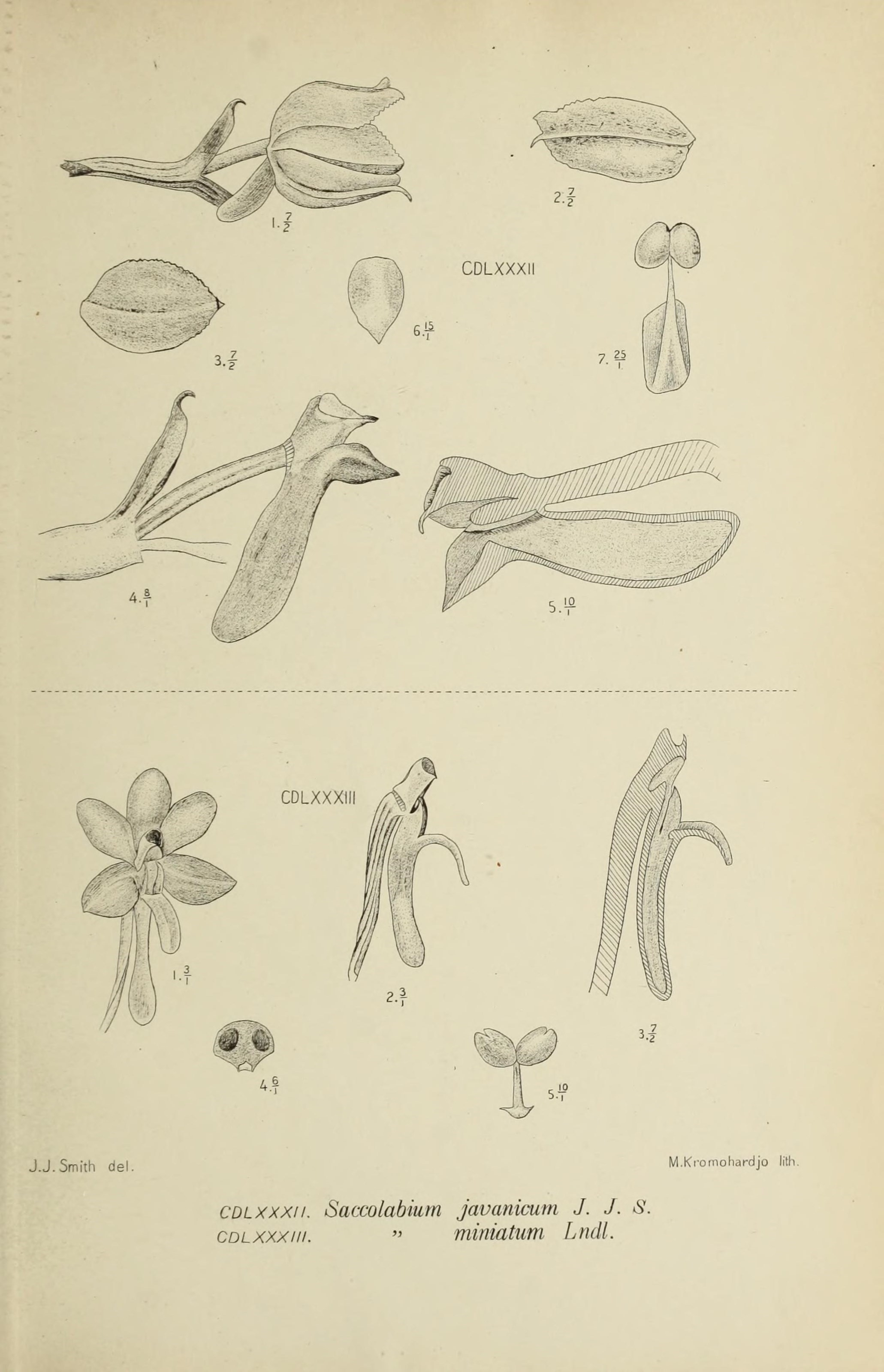
Botanical illustration of Hymenorchis javanica
