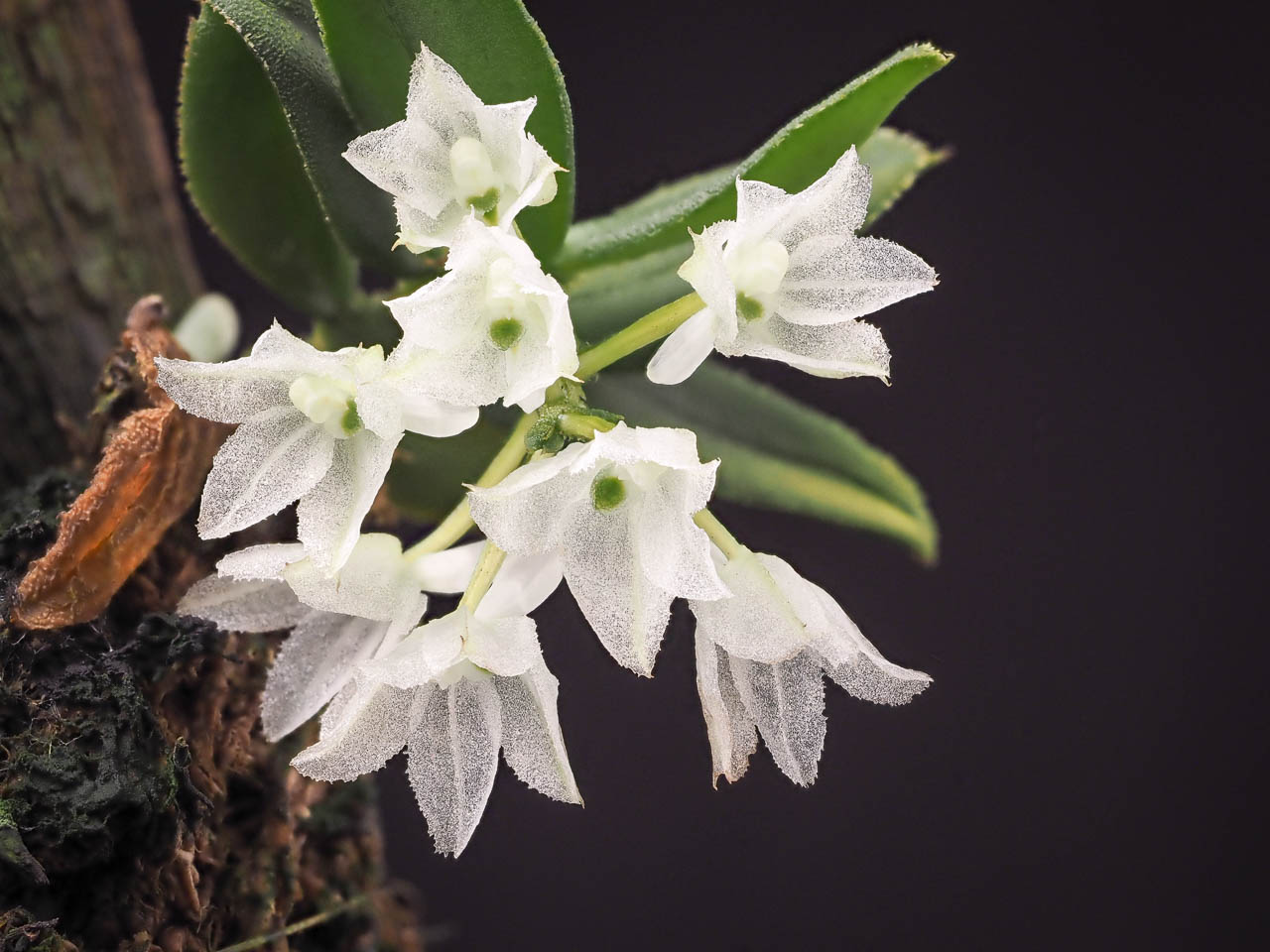
- Hymenorchis javanica

Scientific classification
- Kingdom: Plantae
- Clade: Tracheophytes
- Clade: Angiosperms
- Clade: Monocots
- Order: Asparagales
- Family: Orchidaceae
- Subfamily: Epidendroideae
- Tribe: Vandeae
- Subtribe: Aeridinae
- Genus: Hymenorchis; Schltr.

Type species
- Oeceoclades javanica Teijsm. & Binn.

= Hymenorchis =

Genus of orchids

Hymenorchis is a genus of flowering plants of the orchid family, Orchidaceae. It is native to Vietnam, Malaysia, Indonesia, Philippines, New Guinea and New Caledonia.

== Habitat ==
All species are miniature twig epiphytes, which inhabit the canopy of primary forest.

== Taxonomy ==
=== Species ===
As of June 2023, 14 species are included in Hymenorchis:

- Hymenorchis brassii Ormerod
- Hymenorchis caulina Schltr.
- Hymenorchis foliosa Schltr.
- Hymenorchis glomeroides J.J.Sm.
- Hymenorchis javanica (Teijsm. & Binn.) Schltr.
- Hymenorchis kaniensis Schltr.
- Hymenorchis nannodes Schltr.
- Hymenorchis papuana Kolan. & S.Nowak
- Hymenorchis phitamii Aver.
- Hymenorchis saccata Schltr.
- Hymenorchis serrata Schltr.
- Hymenorchis serrulata (N.Hallé) Garay
- Hymenorchis tanii Schuit. & de Vogel
- Hymenorchis vanoverberghii (Ames) Garay
