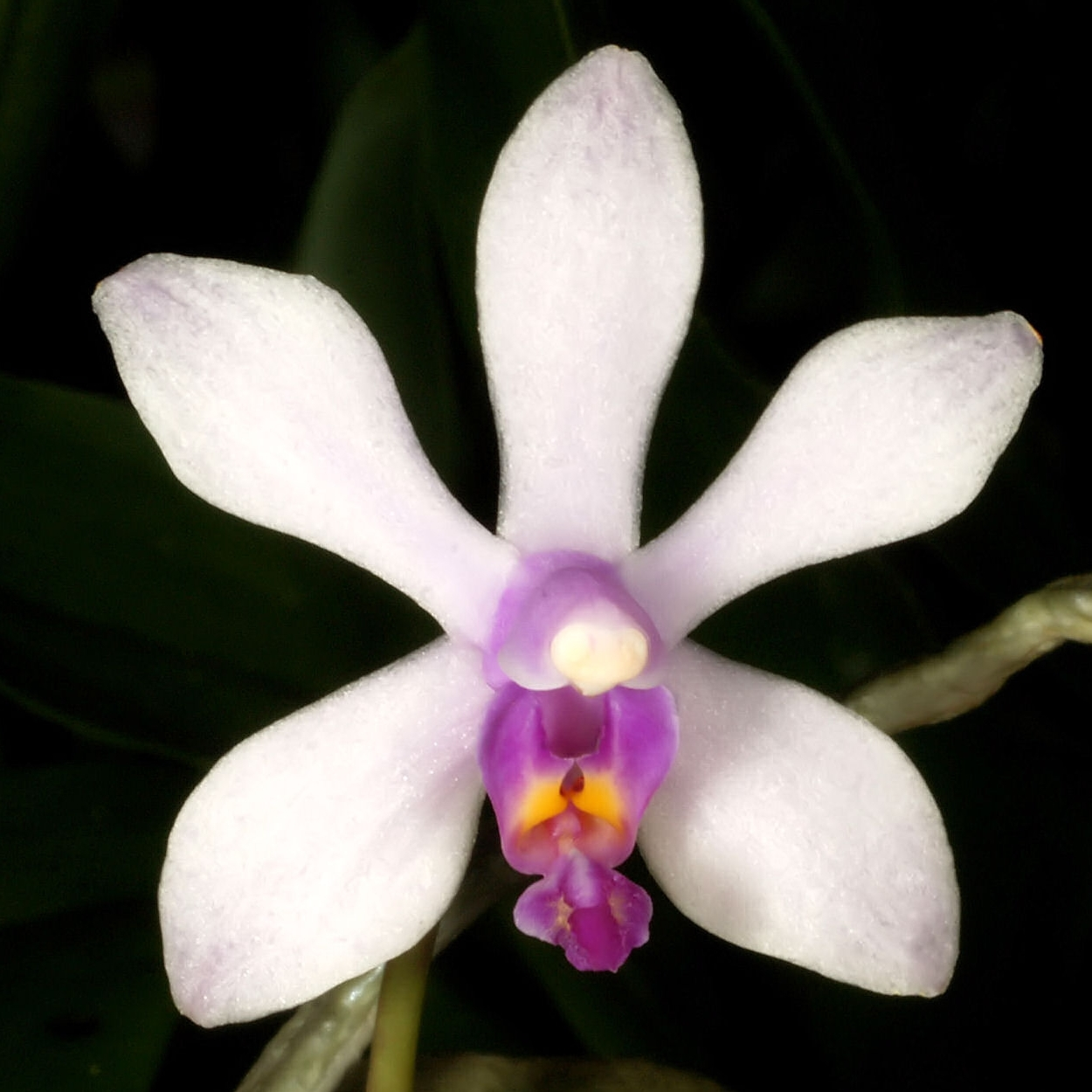
- Flower detail

Scientific classification
- Kingdom: Plantae
- Clade: Tracheophytes
- Clade: Angiosperms
- Clade: Monocots
- Order: Asparagales
- Family: Orchidaceae
- Subfamily: Epidendroideae
- Genus: Phalaenopsis
- Species: P. wilsonii

Binomial name
- Phalaenopsis wilsonii Rolfe

Synonyms
- Doritis wilsonii (Rolfe) T.Yukawa & K.Kita; Kingidium wilsonii (Rolfe) O.Gruss & Roellke; Phalaenopsis chuxiongensis F.Y.Liu; Phalaenopsis minor F.Y.Liu; Phalaenopsis wilsonii f. azurea Z.J.Liu & Z.Z.Ru; Polychilos wilsonii (Rolfe) Shim

= Phalaenopsis wilsonii =

Species of epiphytic orchid

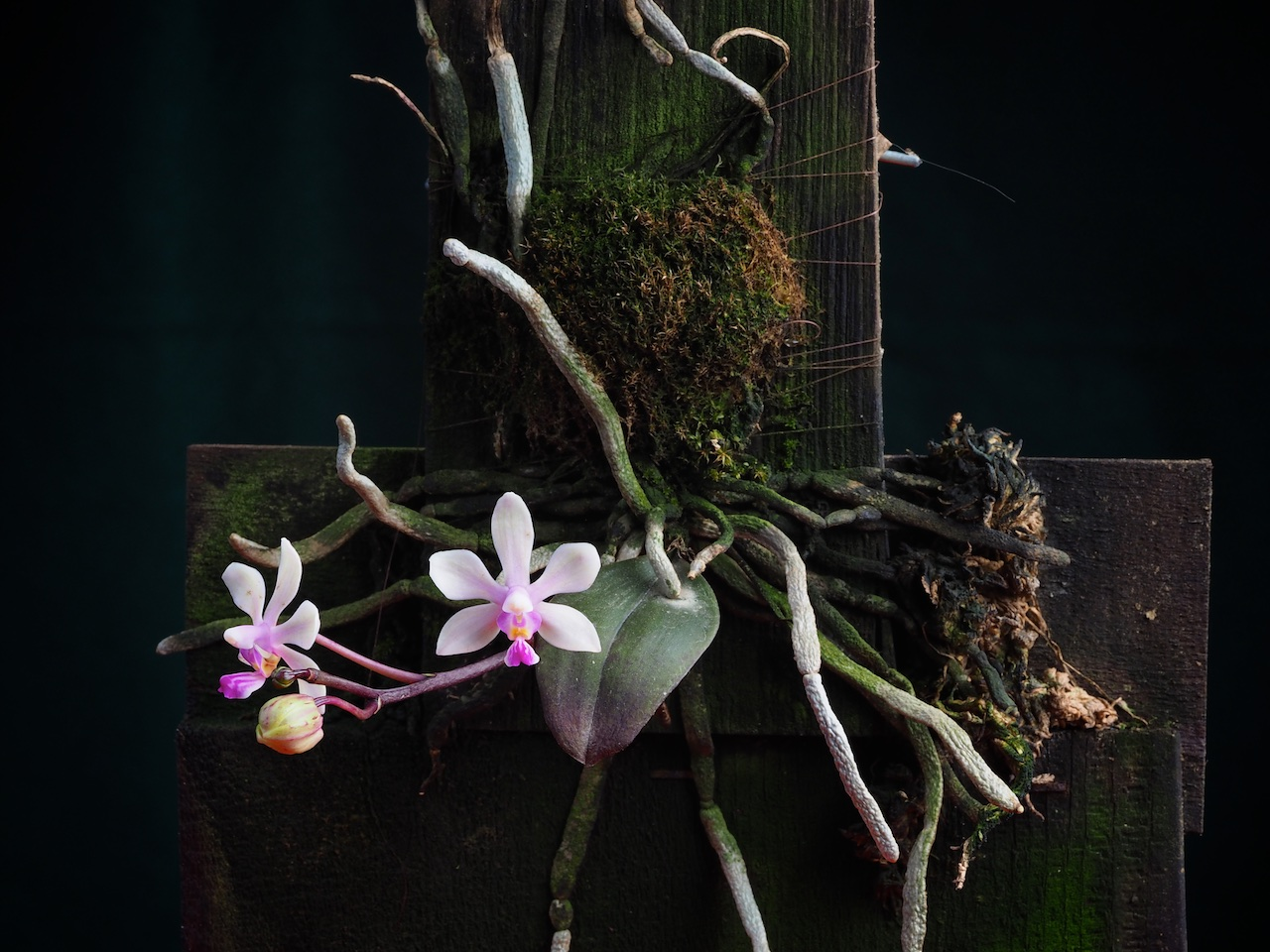
entire plant

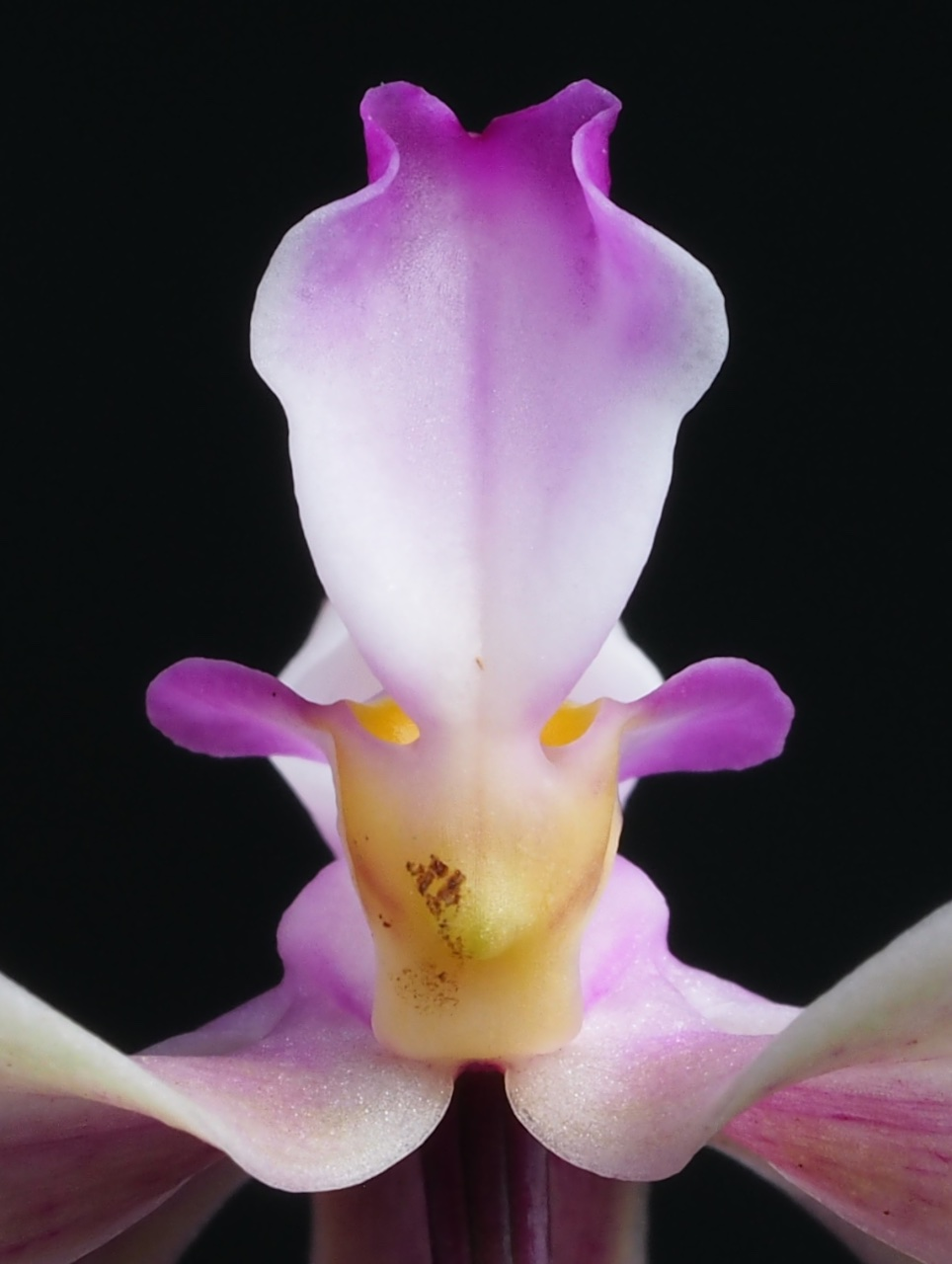
abaxial surface of labellum

Phalaenopsis wilsonii, also known as 华西蝴蝶兰 (hua xi hu die lan) in Chinese, is a species of epiphyte in the family Orchidaceae, native to China, Tibet, Myanmar and Vietnam. Additionally it has been recorded in India.

== Description ==
The 1 cm long stems produce 4-5 oblong to subelliptic, 6.5-8 cm long and 2.6-3 cm wide leaves and greenish, well developed, dorsiventrally flattened, verrucose roots. The leaves often show purple colouration of the abaxial surface and they are shed before flowering, but sometimes 1-2 leaves persist. Flowering occurs throughout April to July. Widely and simultaneously opening, pink flowers are produced on 1-2 suberect or arching, 10-15 flowered racemes. The plants are epiphytes or lithophytes on damp rock found at elevations of 800-2200m a.s.l. The chromosome count is 2n = 2x = 36.

== Taxonomy ==
This species is placed within the subgenus Aphyllae, which is characterised by deciduous leaflessness. A source of taxonomic confusion has been the misapplication of this species name to Phalaenopsis honghenensis. Phylogenetic analysis indicated Phalaenopsis wilsonii was closely related to Phalaenopsis lowii. However, other species from the subgenus Aphyllae were not included in this study.

== Conservation ==
This species has been categorized as vulnerable in China Species Red List. It is protected unter the CITES appendix II regulations of international trade.
