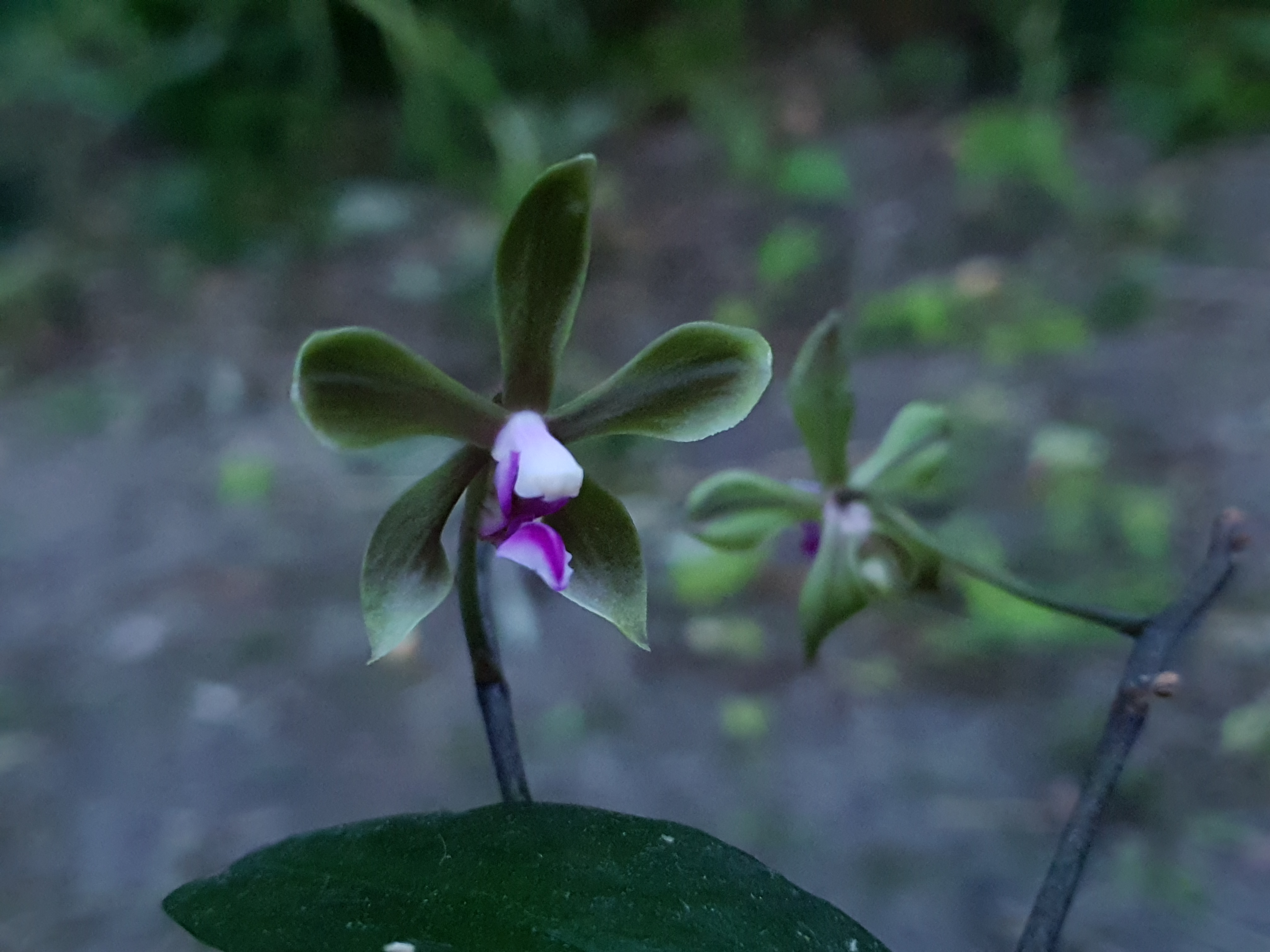
- Flower details

Scientific classification
- Kingdom: Plantae
- Clade: Tracheophytes
- Clade: Angiosperms
- Clade: Monocots
- Order: Asparagales
- Family: Orchidaceae
- Subfamily: Epidendroideae
- Genus: Phalaenopsis
- Species: P. honghenensis

Binomial name
- Phalaenopsis honghenensis F.Y.Liu
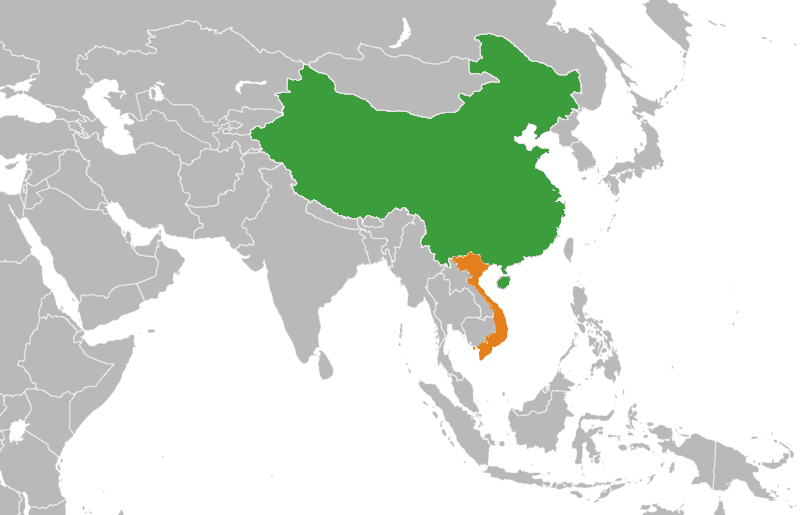
- Distribution of Phalaenopsis honghenensis (China and Vietnam)

Synonyms
- Doritis honghenensis (F.Y.Liu) T.Yukawa & K.Kita

= Phalaenopsis honghenensis =

Species of epiphytic orchid

Phalaenopsis honghenensis, also known as 红河蝴蝶兰 (hong he hu die lan) in Chinese, is a species of orchid native to Southeast China and Vietnam. The specific epithet honghenensis refers to Honghe, China.

== Description ==
Like other members of Phalaenopsis section Aphyllae, this plant exhibits deciduous leaflessness. However, it usually has 1–2 leaves, which are produced on up to 1 cm long stems, which are imbricated in leaf bases. The 5–7 cm long and 1.5–2.5 cm wide leaves are obliquely elliptic and show purple spotting. Verrucose, photosynthetic adventitious roots radiate from the stem. Pink to pale green, 2.9 cm wide flowers are produced on 3–6 flowered, up to 7.7 cm long racemes. A small spur is produced by the labellum.

== Gallery ==
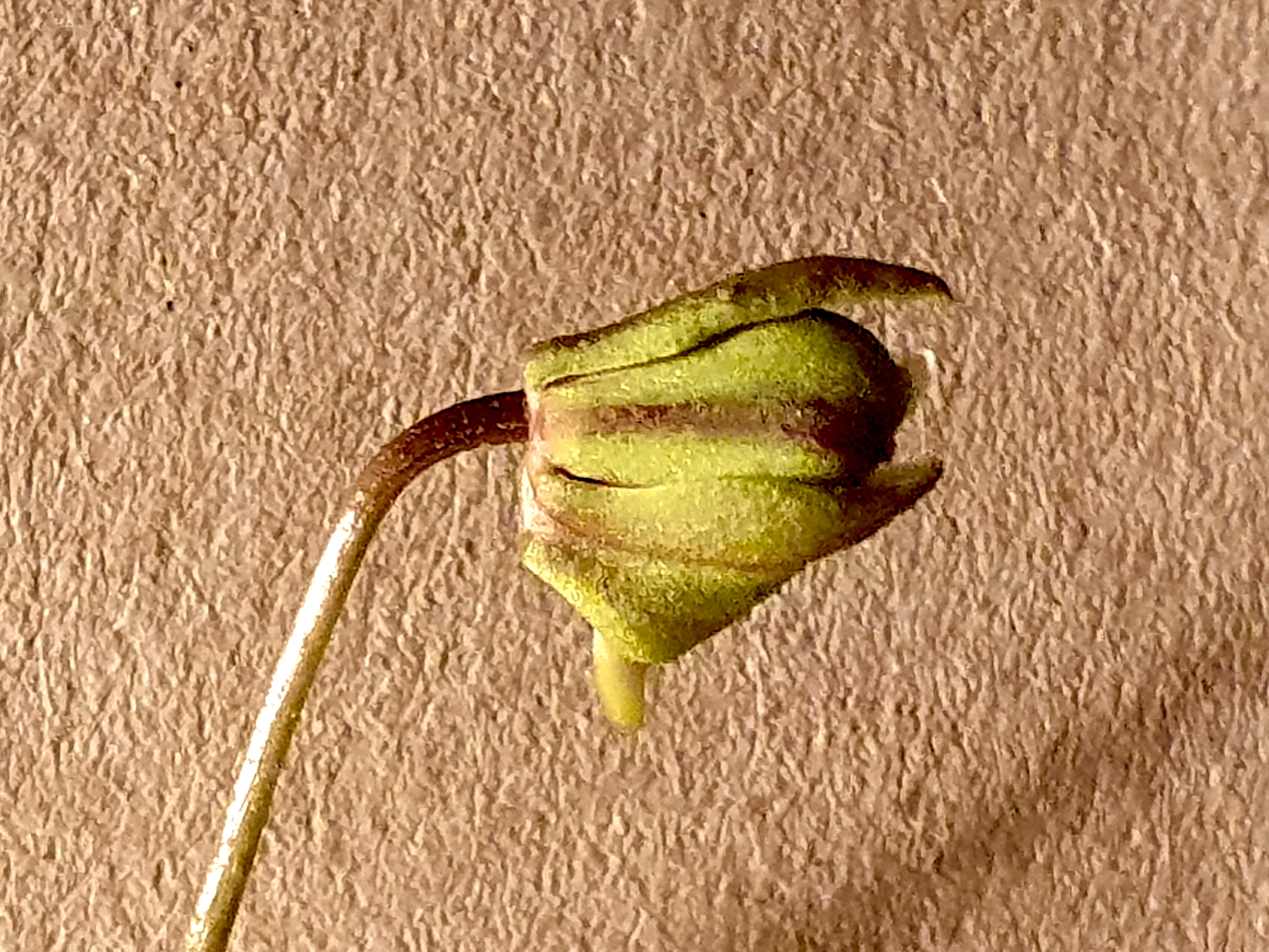
Lateral view of flower bud of Phalaenopsis honghenensis F.Y.Liu with distinct spur

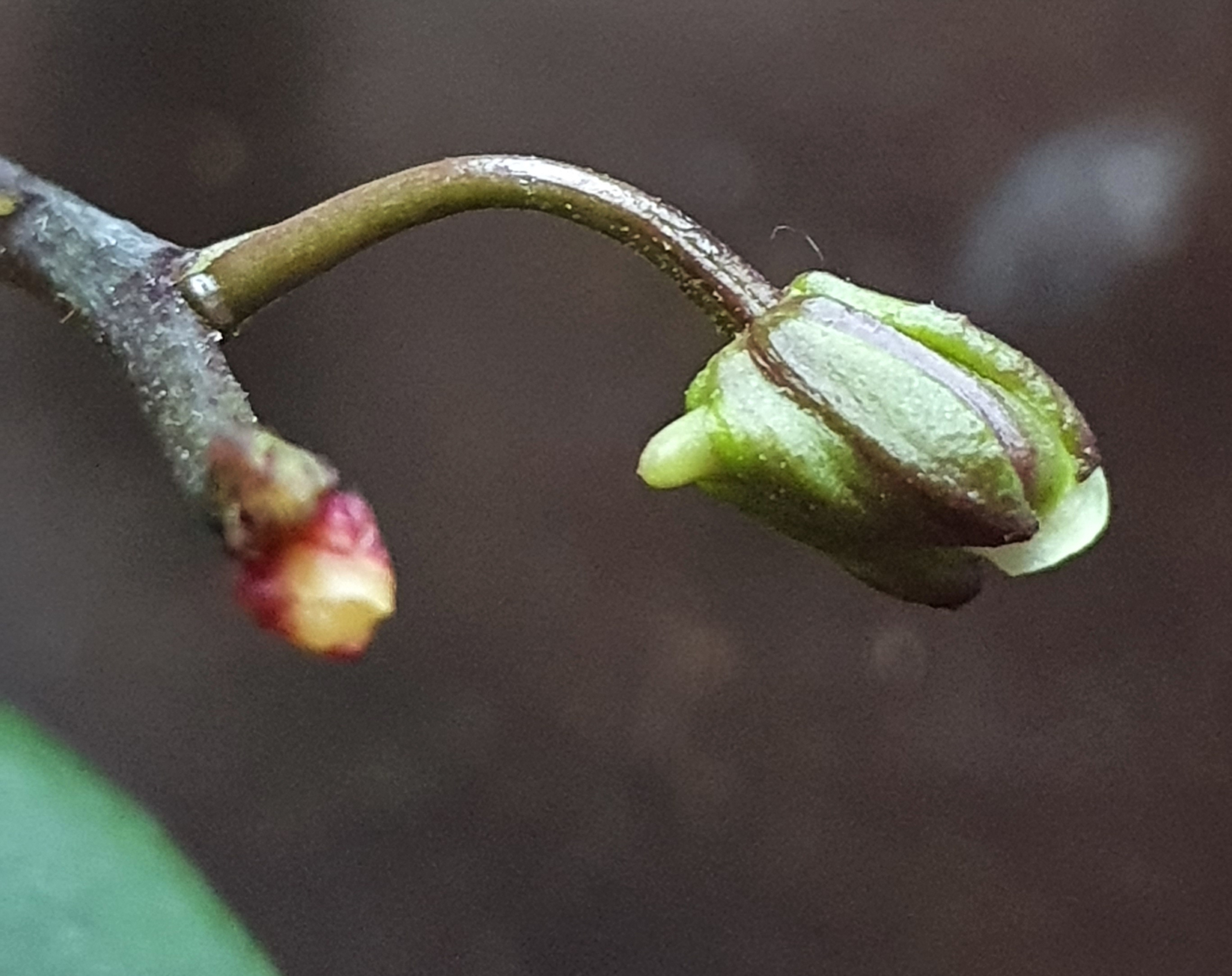
Flower bud of Phalaenopsis honghenensis F.Y.Liu

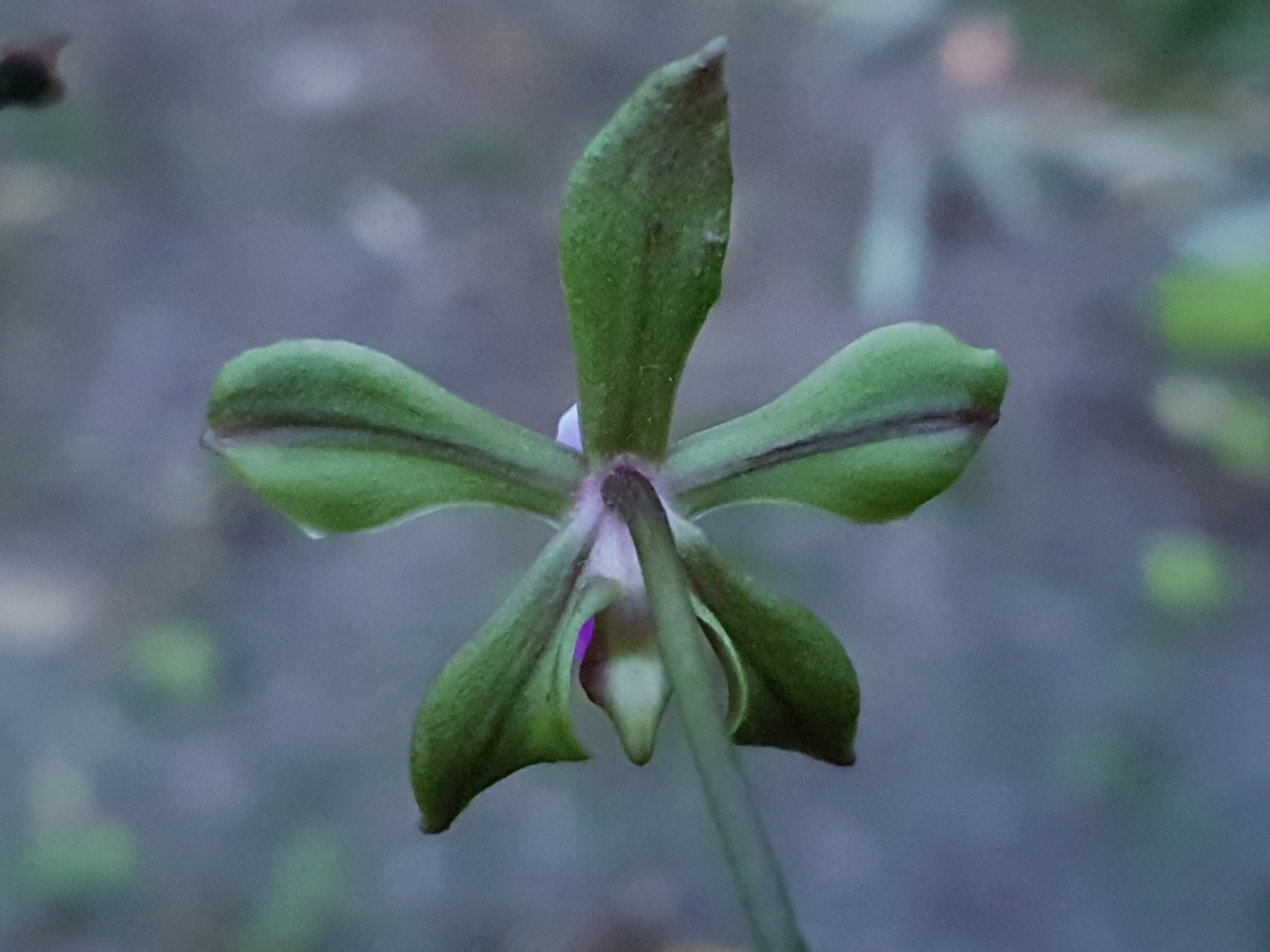
Fully opened flower of Phalaenopsis honghenensis F.Y.Liu viewed from behind

== Taxonomy ==
The variable colouration may be a source of confusion. The flowers may be rose pink or infused with green.
The true phylogenetic relationships within the section Aphyllae are subject of dispute, which is fueled by confusion caused through various authors describing and synonymizing species within this group. Thus, species delimitation and identification is a complex matter.

== Ecology ==
This species grows in elevations of 2000 m above sea level.

== Conservation ==
International trade is regulated through the CITES appendix II regulations of international trade.
