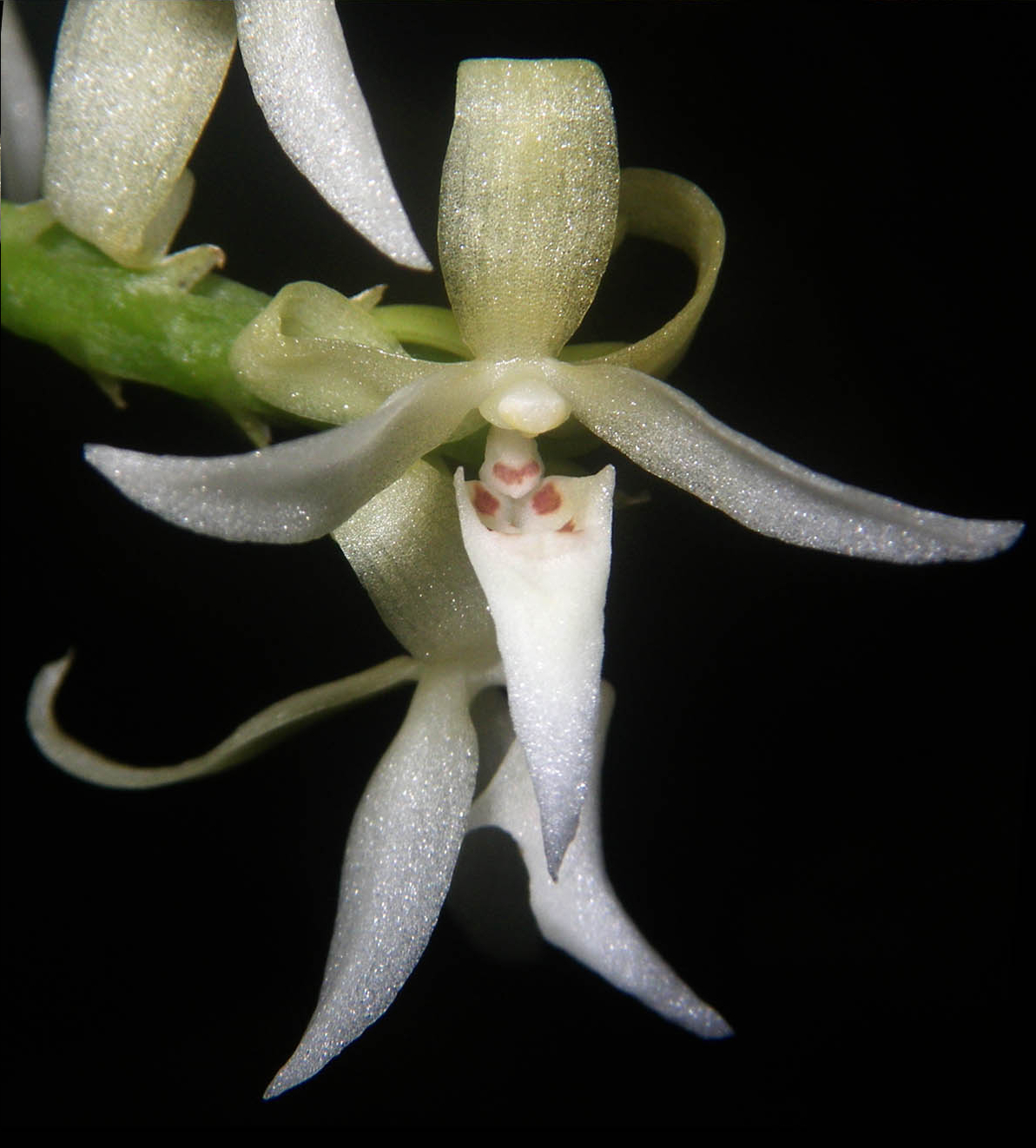
- Flower of Chamaeanthus longicheila

Scientific classification
- Kingdom: Plantae
- Clade: Tracheophytes
- Clade: Angiosperms
- Clade: Monocots
- Order: Asparagales
- Family: Orchidaceae
- Subfamily: Epidendroideae
- Genus: Chamaeanthus
- Species: C. longicheila

Binomial name
- Chamaeanthus longicheila (Aver. & Nuraliev) Vuong & Kumar

Synonyms
- Biermannia longicheila Aver. & Nuraliev

= Chamaeanthus longicheila =

Species of flowering plant

Chamaeanthus longicheila, syn. Biermannia longicheila, is a species of flowering plant in the family Orchidaceae. It is an epiphytic subshrub native and endemic to Vietnam.

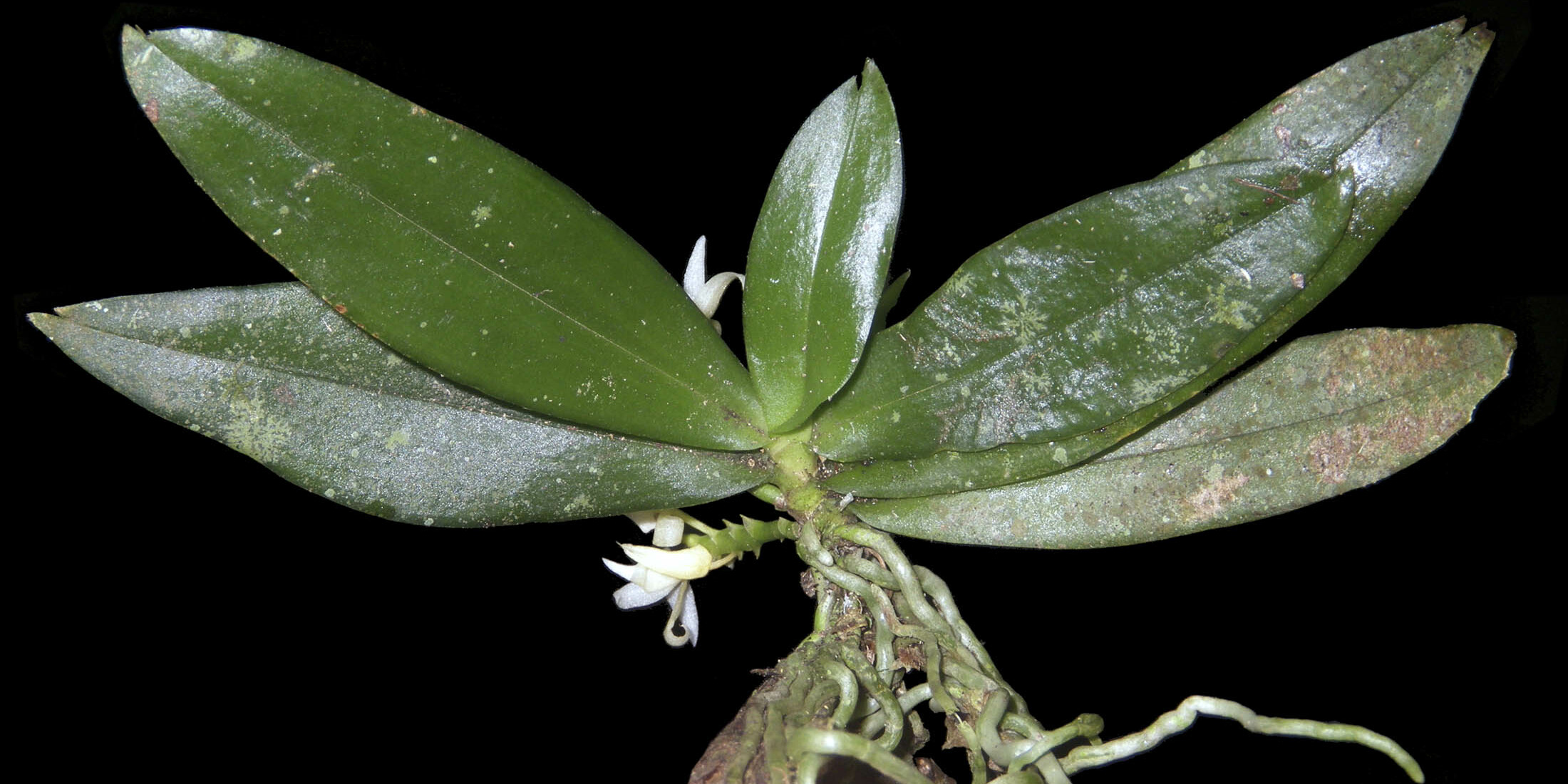
Leaves

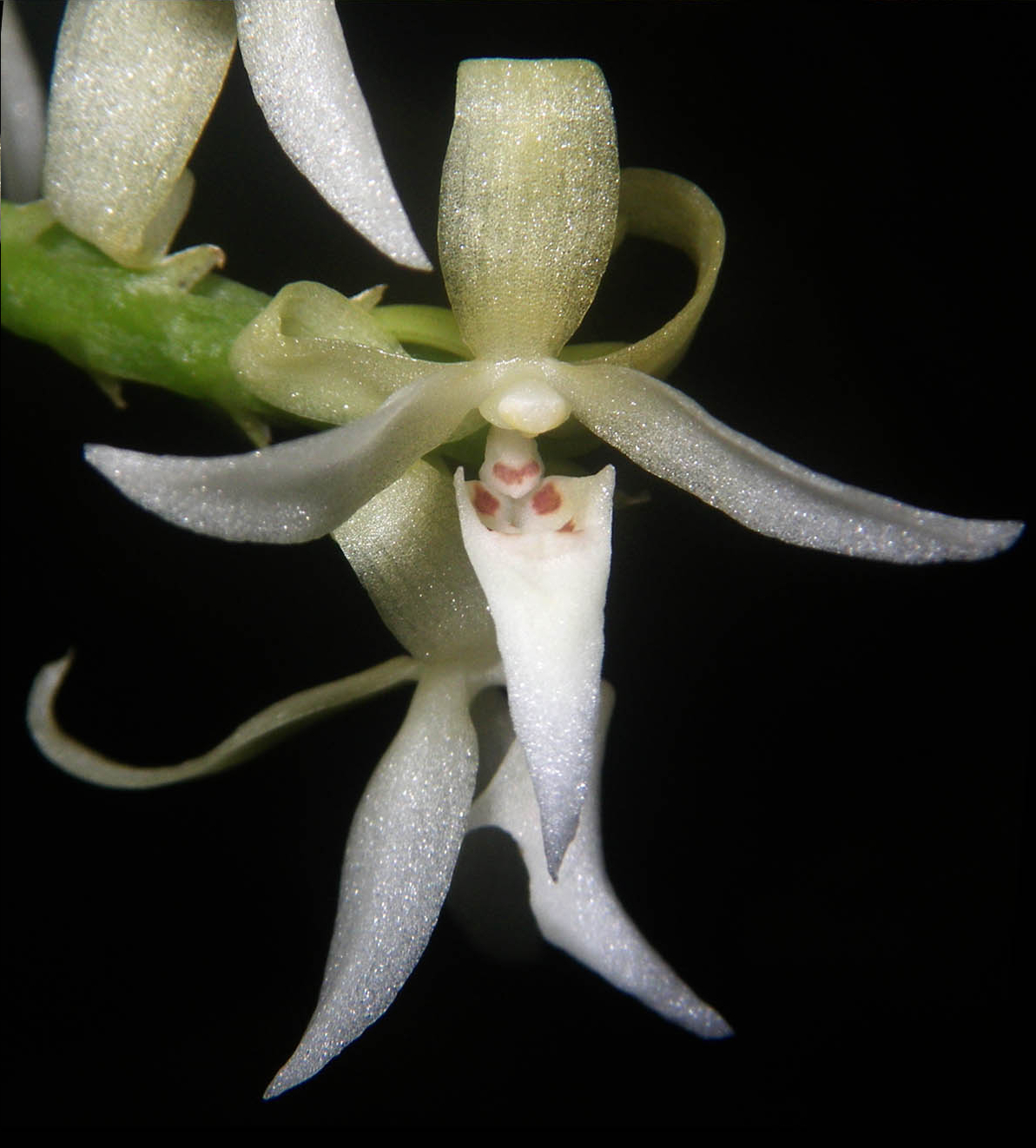
Flower
