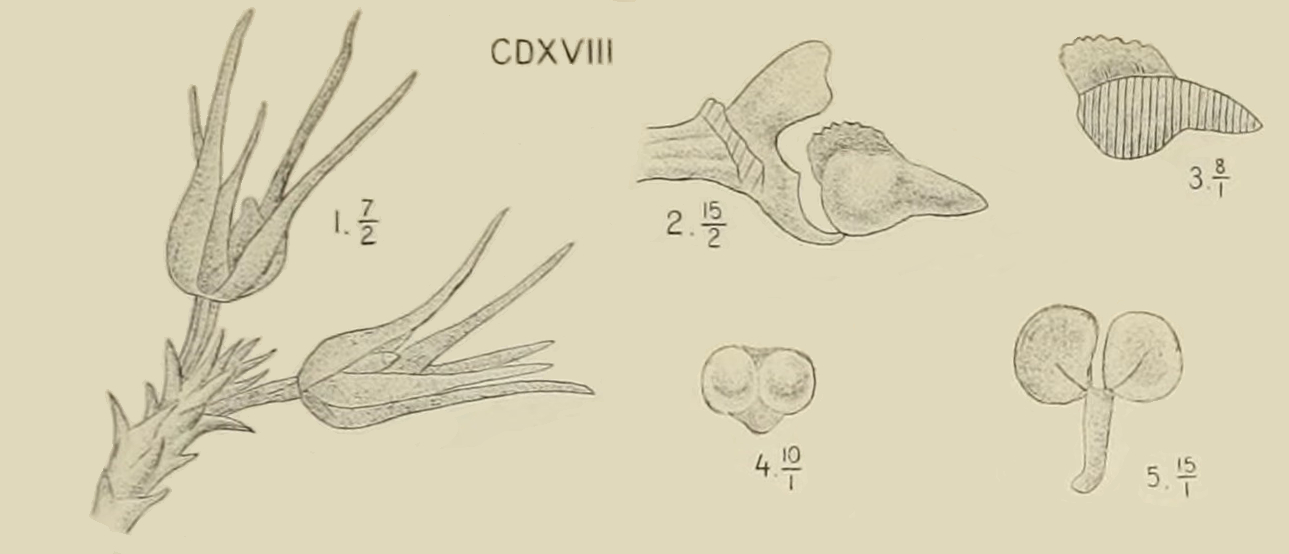

Scientific classification
- Kingdom: Plantae
- Clade: Tracheophytes
- Clade: Angiosperms
- Clade: Monocots
- Order: Asparagales
- Family: Orchidaceae
- Subfamily: Epidendroideae
- Tribe: Vandeae
- Subtribe: Aeridinae
- Genus: Chamaeanthus; Schltr. in J.J.Smith

Type species
- Chamaeanthus brachystachys Schltr. in J.J.Smith

= Chamaeanthus =

Genus of orchids

Chamaeanthus is a genus of flowering plants from the orchid family, Orchidaceae. Four species are currently recognized as of September 2025, all native to southeastern Asia.

- Chamaeanthus brachystachys Schltr. in J.J.Smith - Java, Borneo, southern Thailand
- Chamaeanthus wenzelii Ames - Taiwan, Philippines
- Chamaeanthus longicheila (Aver. & Nuraliev) Vuong & Kumar - Vietnam
- Chamaeanthus canhii (Aver.) Vuong & Kumar - Vietnam
