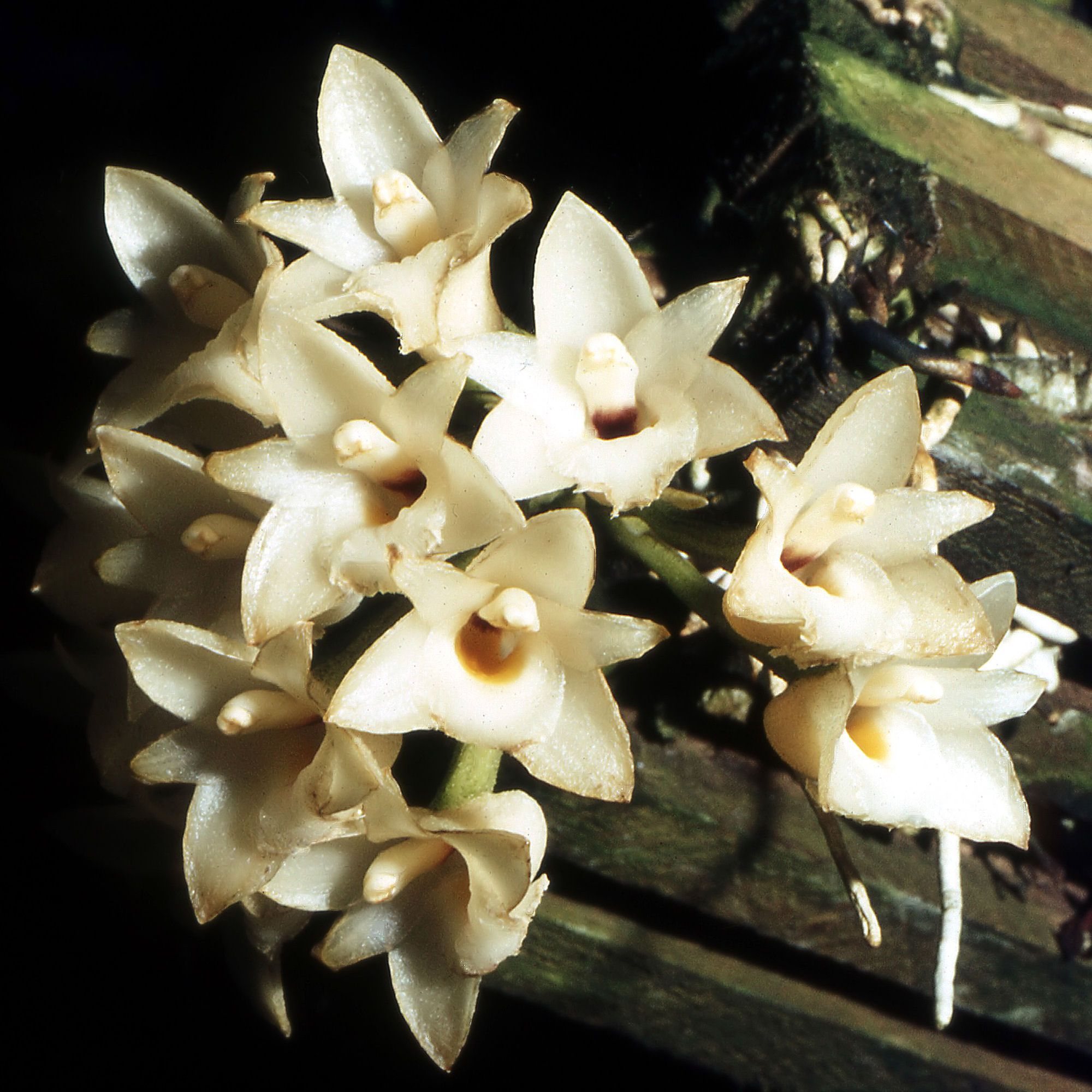
- Coeliopsis hyacinthosma

Scientific classification
- Kingdom: Plantae
- Clade: Tracheophytes
- Clade: Angiosperms
- Clade: Monocots
- Order: Asparagales
- Family: Orchidaceae
- Subfamily: Epidendroideae
- Tribe: Cymbidieae
- Subtribe: Coeliopsidinae; Szlach.

Type genus
- Coeliopsis

= Coeliopsidinae =

Subtribe of orchids

Coeliopsidinae is an orchid subtribe in the tribe Cymbidieae. The three members of this subtribe have traditionally been lumped in with Stanhopeinae, but obvious morphological traits and new molecular analysis by Whitten et al. in 2000 confirmed the group reclassified by Szlachetko (1995).

These genera have smooth, unribbed, ovoid pseudobulbs with 3-4 large and thin plicate leaves. The inflorescences are thick and bear globose flowers with thick, fleshy sepals and petals, presence of a column foot and mentum. Roots have prominent root hairs.

Most distinct is the viscidia that are button-shaped and sclerified with short stipes. The three genera all have elongated Maxillaria-type dust seeds and not Stanhopea-type balloon seeds.

Like Stanhopeinae the members of this group are pollinated by male euglossine bees. The sticky viscidia of this group are adapted to attachment on the smooth surface of the scutum of the male bees. (Peristeria elata, the pollinia attaches to the bee's head; in Coeliopsis, on the frons of the bee's head; Williams, 1982.)

Stanhopeinae and Coeliopsidinae are now considered closely related sister subtribes.

== Genera ==
Image	Genus	Species
	Coeliopsis Rchb.f. (1872)	Coeliopsis hyacinthosma
	Lycomormium Rchb.f. 1852	Lycomormium ecuadorense H.R.Sweet - Ecuador; Lycomormium elatum C.Schweinf. - Peru; Lycomormium fiskei H.R.Sweet - Ecuador, Peru; Lycomormium schmidtii A.Fernández - Colombia; Lycomormium squalidum (Poepp. & Endl.) Rchb.f. - Ecuador, Peru, Colombia
	Peristeria Hook. 1836	Peristeria aspersa Rolfe 1890; Peristeria cerina Lindl. 1837; Peristeria cochlearis Garay 1972; Peristeria elata Hook. 1831; Peristeria ephippium Rchb.f. 1883; Peristeria esperanzae P.Ortiz 2008; Peristeria guttata Knowles & Westc. 1838; Peristeria leucoxantha Garay 1954; Peristeria lindenii Rolfe 1891; Peristeria oscarii-rodrigoi Archila, Szlach. & Kolan. 2015; Peristeria pendula Hook. 1836; Peristeria selligera Rchb.f. 1887; Peristeria serroniana (Barb.Rodr.) Garay 1954
