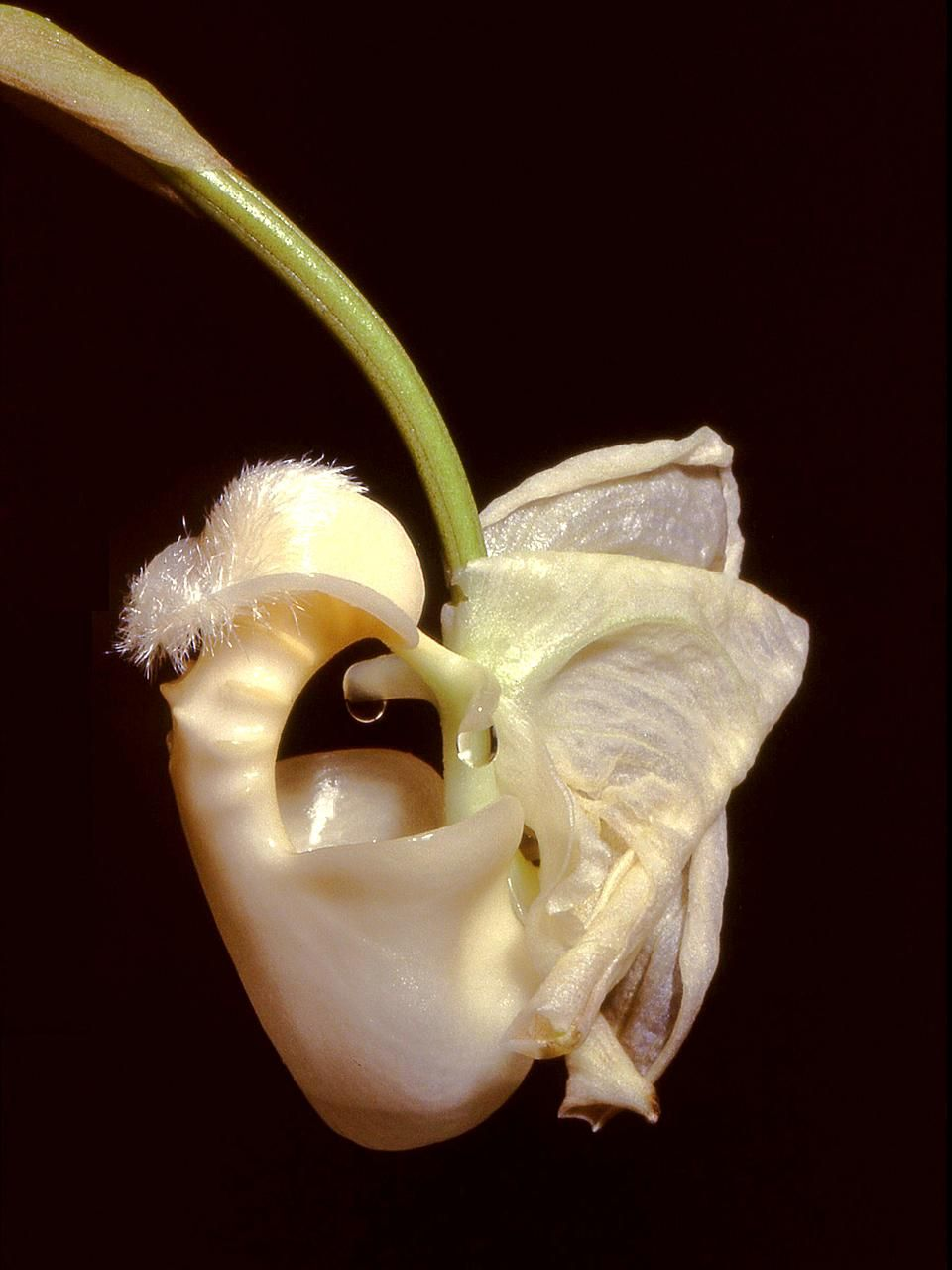
- Coryanthes alborosea, a member of the subtribe

Scientific classification
- Kingdom: Plantae
- Clade: Tracheophytes
- Clade: Angiosperms
- Clade: Monocots
- Order: Asparagales
- Family: Orchidaceae
- Subfamily: Epidendroideae
- Tribe: Cymbidieae
- Subtribe: Stanhopeinae; Benth.

Type genus
- Stanhopea

= Stanhopeinae =

Subtribe of orchids

Stanhopeinae is a subtribe of plants in the tribe Cymbidieae.

The subtribe in the strict sense, have viscidia and stipes that are thin and strap-like, they are adapted for attachment to edge of the bee's scutellum or to a leg. Pseudobulbs are usually ribbed/four-angled or flattened. Leaves are generally thicker than Coeliopsidinae. Roots are smooth, without prominent root hairs. The column foot is lacking or not distinct. Unpollinated flowers quickly abscise and fall from the inflorescence, unlike members of Coeliopsidinae which include Coeliopsis, Lycomormium, and Peristeria. Stanhopeinae and Coeliopsidinae are now considered closely related sister subtribes.

Within Stanhopeinae the members can be further grouped in six clades based on morphological traits and molecular analysis.

- Braemia Clade: Braemia
- Gongora Clade: Cirrhaea & Gongora
- Acineta Clade: Acineta, Lacaena, Lueddemannia & Vasqueziella
- Polycycnis Clade: Kegeliella, Polycycnis & Soterosanthus
- Stanhopea Clade: Coryanthes, Embreea, Stanhopea & Sievekingia
- Houlletia Clade: Horichia, Houlletia, Jennyella, Paphinia, Schlimia & Trevoria

The genus Archivea is only known by a watercolor painting by T. Duncanson in the herbarium archives of the Royal Botanic Gardens, Kew. No pressed specimens or living material is known, so it can not be grouped into a specific clade.

All species in this subtribe are exclusively pollinated by male euglossine bees, which are attracted to the floral fragrances, and collect them. One orchid species may attract only one or a few species of bees from dozens of species in the habitat.

== Genera ==
- Acineta
- Archivea
- Braemia
- Cirrhaea
- Coryanthes
- Embreea
- Gongora
- Horichia
- Houlletia
- Kegeliella
- Lacaena
- Lueckelia
- Lueddemannia
- Paphinia
- Polycycnis
- Schlimia
- Sievekingia
- Soterosanthus
- Stanhopea
- Trevoria
- Vasqueziella

In synonymy:

- Endresiella: see Trevoria
- Jennyella
- Stanhopeastrum: see Stanhopea
