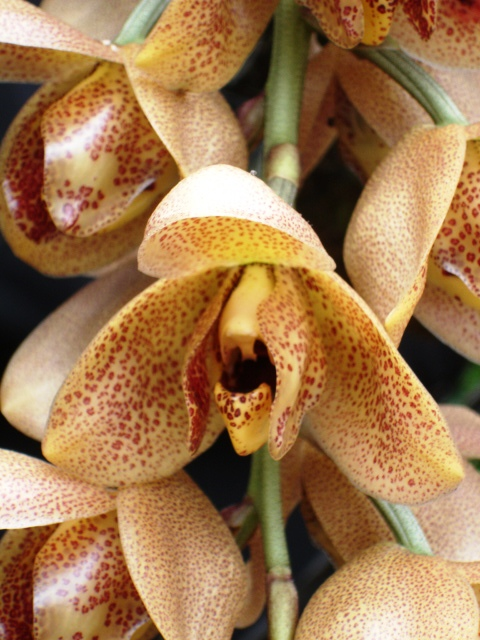
- Acineta superba

Scientific classification
- Kingdom: Plantae
- Clade: Tracheophytes
- Clade: Angiosperms
- Clade: Monocots
- Order: Asparagales
- Family: Orchidaceae
- Subfamily: Epidendroideae
- Tribe: Cymbidieae
- Subtribe: Stanhopeinae
- Genus: Acineta; Lindl. (1843)

Type species
- Acineta superba (Kunth) Rchb.f. in W.G.Walpers (1863)

Species
- Acineta alticola; Acineta antioquiae; Acineta barkeri; Acineta beyrodtiana; Acineta chrysantha; Acineta confusa; Acineta cryptodonta; Acineta dalessandroi; Acineta densa; Acineta erythroxantha; Acineta hagsateri; Acineta hennisiana; Acineta hrubyana; Acineta mireyae; Acineta salazarii; Acineta sella-turcica; Acineta sulcata; Acineta superba

Synonyms
- Neippergia C. Morren

= Acineta =

Genus of epiphytes

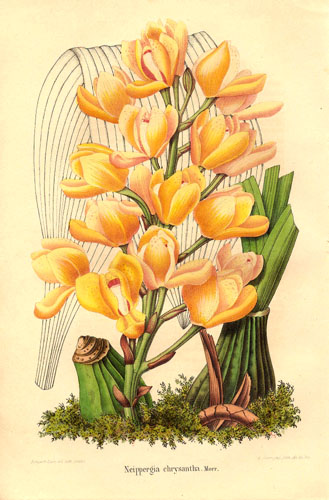
Acineta chrysantha

Acineta, abbreviated as Acn in horticultural trade, is a small genus belonging to the orchid family (Orchidaceae). The name is derived from the Greek word 'akinetos' (immobile), referring to the rigid labellum (lip).

These epiphytic orchids occur in tropical mountainous forests from Mexico to western South America, at altitudes up to 2,000 m. They are sometimes lithophytic when found on steep embankments.

The large, plicate leaves are parallel-nerved and resemble those of Peristeria and Lycaste, while the structure of the flowers bears a closer resemblance to Stanhopea.

The species produce a pendent inflorescence, bearing racemes of many fragrant cup-shaped, pale yellow to reddish brown flowers. The sidelobes of the labellum (lip) come together in a central callus. The basal part of the lip (hypochile) is at least as long as the sidelobes. The column is pubescent. The column of these orchids bears two pollinia, except in Acineta dalessandroi, which has four (making its classification in this genus doubtful). These orchids are insect pollinated by male bees in the genus Eulaema or Eufriesia.

Some regard these as being among of the most splendid looking of all orchids.

For relatives of Acineta see Stanhopeinae.

== Intergeneric hybrids ==
- Aciopea (Acienta × Stanhopea)
- Acinbreea (Acineta × Embreea)
