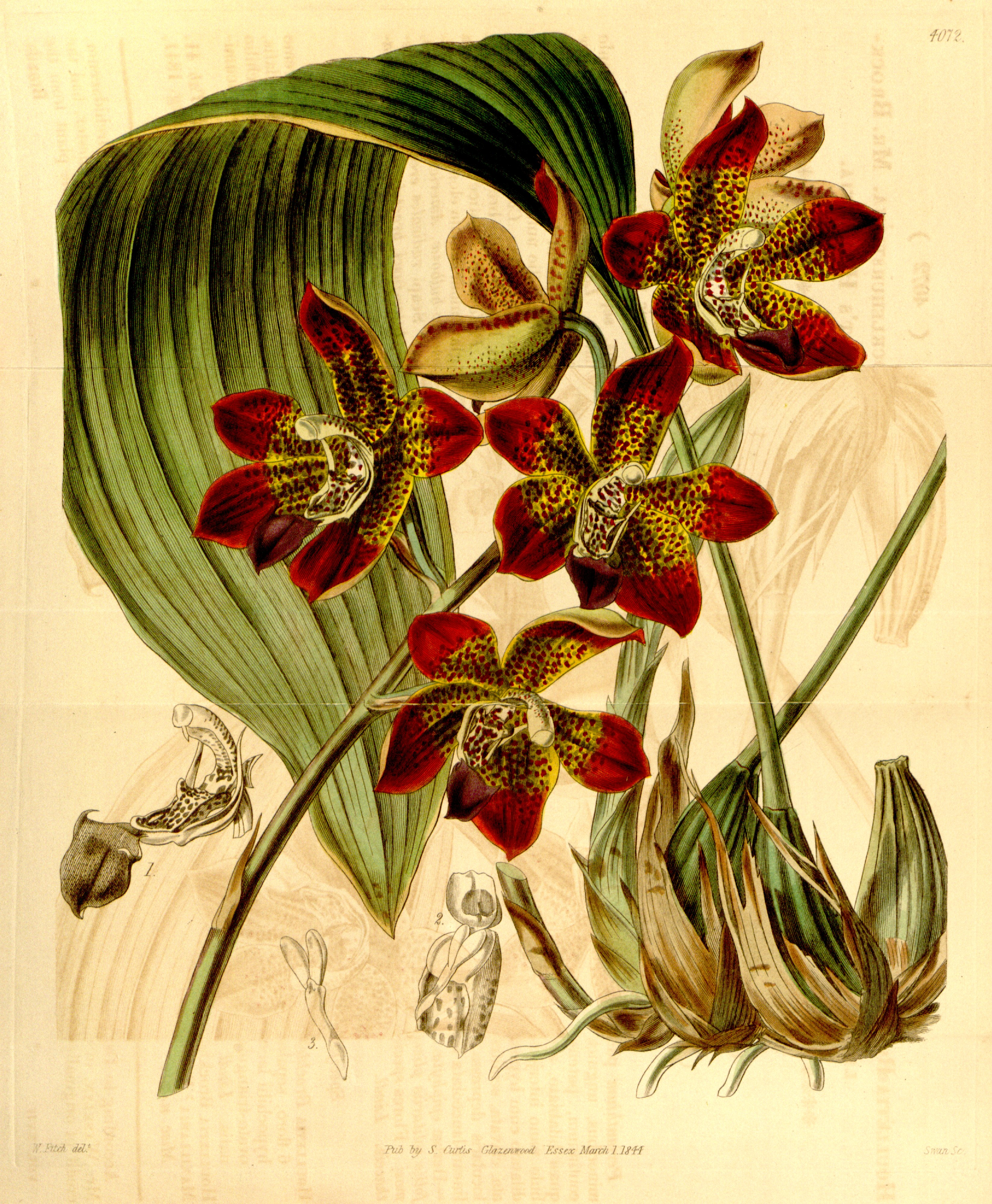
- Houlletia odoratissima

Scientific classification
- Kingdom: Plantae
- Clade: Tracheophytes
- Clade: Angiosperms
- Clade: Monocots
- Order: Asparagales
- Family: Orchidaceae
- Subfamily: Epidendroideae
- Tribe: Cymbidieae
- Subtribe: Stanhopeinae
- Genus: Houlletia; Brongn. (1841)

Type species
- Houlletia stapeliaeflora Brongn.

Species
- See text.

Synonyms
- Jennyella Lückel & Fessel

= Houlletia =

Genus of orchids

Houlletia is a genus of large-growing epiphytic orchids native to Mexico, and possibly also Guatemala through Central America to Bolivia. was established with the publication by Brogniartt of Houlletia brocklehurstiana in 1841. The genus is named in honor of orchid collector and grower M. Houllet, French orchid collector in Brazil, later the director of the Botanic Jardin des Plantes in Paris, 19th century.

== Description ==
The plants have ovoid, ridged pseudobulbs, each bearing 2-4 large, pleated leaves. The inflorescences begin from the base of the pseudobulbs and are always pendant, with fleshy, showy flowers hanging downward ("nodding") on a simple raceme. The dorsal sepal is free and the lateral sepals form a short mentum with the column foot. The petals are similar to the dorsal sepal but smaller. The lip is deeply 3-lobed, the lateral lobes are upcurved and the mid-lobe is spreading. The anther is imperfectly two-celled and there are two waxy pollinia, cleft, with viscidium and a prominent stipe.

== Taxonomy ==
Houlletia is placed in the subtribe Stanhopeinae.

In 1999, E. Luckel & H. Fessel published the new genus Jennyella "to accommodate the globose, white flowered taxa." Their new genus included four Houlletia species. As of December 2023, Jennyella was not accepted by Plants of the World Online, which treated it as a synonym of Houlletia.

A 2000 molecular phylogenetic study distinguished a Houlletia clade within the subtribe, comprising Horichia, Houlletia, Paphinia, Schlimmia, and Trevoria. The study suggested that Houlletia might be paraphyletic, with two morphologically distinct groups. One group, containing H. brockelhurstiana (the type species), H. tigrina and H. odoratissima, has open, resupinate flowers heavily spotted in red-brown and the lip shares many features of the lip of Paphinia. The viscidium is narrow, approximately the same width as the long stipe. The other group, containing H. sanderi, H. wallisii and H. lowiana, has globose, nonresupinate white to yellow flowers, mostly unspotted, and borne on an erect inflorescence. The viscidium is broad and concave.

=== Species ===
As of December 2023, Plants of the World Online accepted the following species:

- Houlletia brocklehurstiana Lindl.
- Houlletia conspersa P.Ortiz
- Houlletia lowiana Rchb.f.
- Houlletia odoratissima Linden
- Houlletia roraimensis Rolfe
- Houlletia sanderi Rolfe
- Houlletia tigrina (Linden) Lindl.
- Houlletia unguiculata Schltr.
- Houlletia uribevelezii Sauleda
- Houlletia wallisii Linden & Rchb.f.

=== Intergeneric hybrids ===
- Houllora (Gongora × Houlletia), in Orchid Rev., 108(1234), IPNI ID 1014858-1, February 7, 2003

== Habitat ==
They are found growing epiphytically and terrestrially on embankments in cool, humid, wet areas, 1,000-2,200 m elevation.
