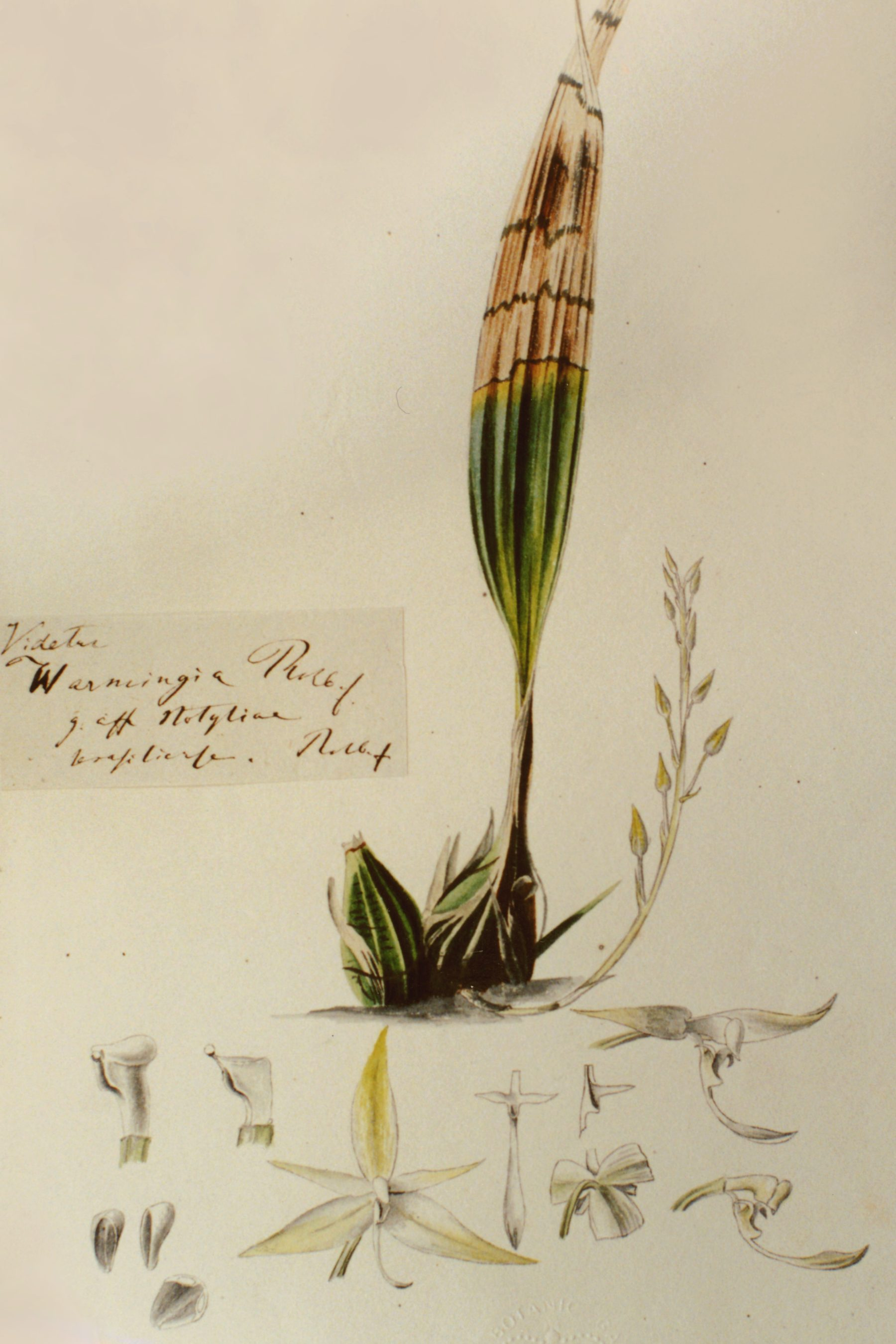
- T. Duncanson's 1823 watercolour illustration, later described as Archivea kewensis

Conservation status
- CITES Appendix II

Scientific classification
- Kingdom: Plantae
- Clade: Tracheophytes
- Clade: Angiosperms
- Clade: Monocots
- Order: Asparagales
- Family: Orchidaceae
- Subfamily: Epidendroideae
- Tribe: Cymbidieae
- Subtribe: Stanhopeinae
- Genus: Archivea; Christenson & Jenny
- Species: A. kewensis

Binomial name
- Archivea kewensis Christenson & Jenny

= Archivea =

Monotypic orchid genus

Archivea is a monotypic genus of orchids containing only the species Archivea kewensis. Known only from an 1823 watercolour illustration, it was described in 1996 by botanists Eric A. Christenson and Rudolf Jenny. It is believed to be native to Brazil, though it has yet to be documented beyond the original 1823 illustration.

== Taxonomy and history ==
A live specimen of the plant later described as Archivea kewensis was brought from Brazil to the United Kingdom in 1816, coming into the possession of amateur botanist W.R. Price. A watercolour illustration of this plant, painted by T. Duncanson and dated 29 July 1823, formed the sole basis of the species' scientific description over 150 years later. The illustration came to be held in the collection of the Royal Botanic Gardens, Kew, where it was examined and annotated by German orchidologist Heinrich Gustav Reichenbach. Reichenbach's note reads "Videtur Warmingia Rchb.f. g. aff. Notyliae brasiliense, Rchb.f.", alluding to a perceived similarity between the plant in the illustration and the Oncidiinae genus Warmingia.

The genus Archivea and sole species A. kewensis were described by botanists Eric A. Christenson and Rudolf Jenny in the May 1996 issue of Orchids, the magazine of the American Orchid Society. Christenson and Jenny's description was translated into Brazilian Portuguese for publication in the Brazilian magazine Revista Orquidário, in the interest of raising awareness of this species among Brazilian orchid collectors and researchers. The 1823 watercolour illustration represents the type and only specimen. No measurements of the plant were recorded and no other specimens, living or pressed, are known. The generic and specific epithets reference the location of the type specimen in the archives of the Royal Botanic Gardens, Kew. Though DNA analysis was not possible, Christenson and Jenny placed it in the subtribe Stanhopeinae based on morphological characteristics.

== Description ==
Archivea kewensis is described as resembling Cirrhaea species in habit, with flowers most similar to Horichia dressleri. The pseudobulbs, ovoid in shape and deeply vertically ribbed, each bear a single plicate leaf. Dry bracts persist around the bases of the pseudobulbs. The leaf blade is lanceolate with a pointed tip, measuring approximately three times the length of the petiole. The inflorescence arises from the base of the plant but grows upright, bearing around 10 flowers and two bracts near the base. The flowers are white, with the petals and sepals becoming yellowish towards the tips. The sepals are broadly lanceolate with pointed tips, with the lateral sepals being slightly slanted while the dorsal sepal is concave. The petals are linear-lanceolate with pointed tips, approximately two thirds the length and half the width of the sepals. The labellum is split into three lobes, with the upwards curved oblanceolate middle lobe being four times the length of the linear-lanceolate side lobes. The side lobes are fused around the base of the mid lobe, forming a keel. The column is short and straight with the clinandrium positioned at a right angle on the end of the column. The ovary is circular. The pollinarium and fruit have not been documented.
