= Bifrenaria grandis =

Scientific classification
- Kingdom: Plantae
- Clade: Embryophytes
- Clade: Tracheophytes
- Clade: Spermatophytes
- Clade: Angiosperms
- Clade: Monocots
- Order: Asparagales
- Family: Orchidaceae
- Subfamily: Epidendroideae
- Genus: Bifrenaria
- Species: B. grandis

Binomial name
- Bifrenaria grandis (Kraenzl.) Garay

Synonyms
- See text

Species of orchid

Bifrenaria grandis is an orchid that is normally placed in the genus Bifrenaria. However it has been molecularly determined that the species is actually part of the genus Lacaena. It is endemic to Bolivia.
