= Peristeria =

Peristeria may refer to:

- Peristeria (plant), a genus of orchids
- Peristeria, Drama, a village in the Drama regional unit, Greece
- Peristeria (volcano), one of the volcanoes of the Santorini complex
