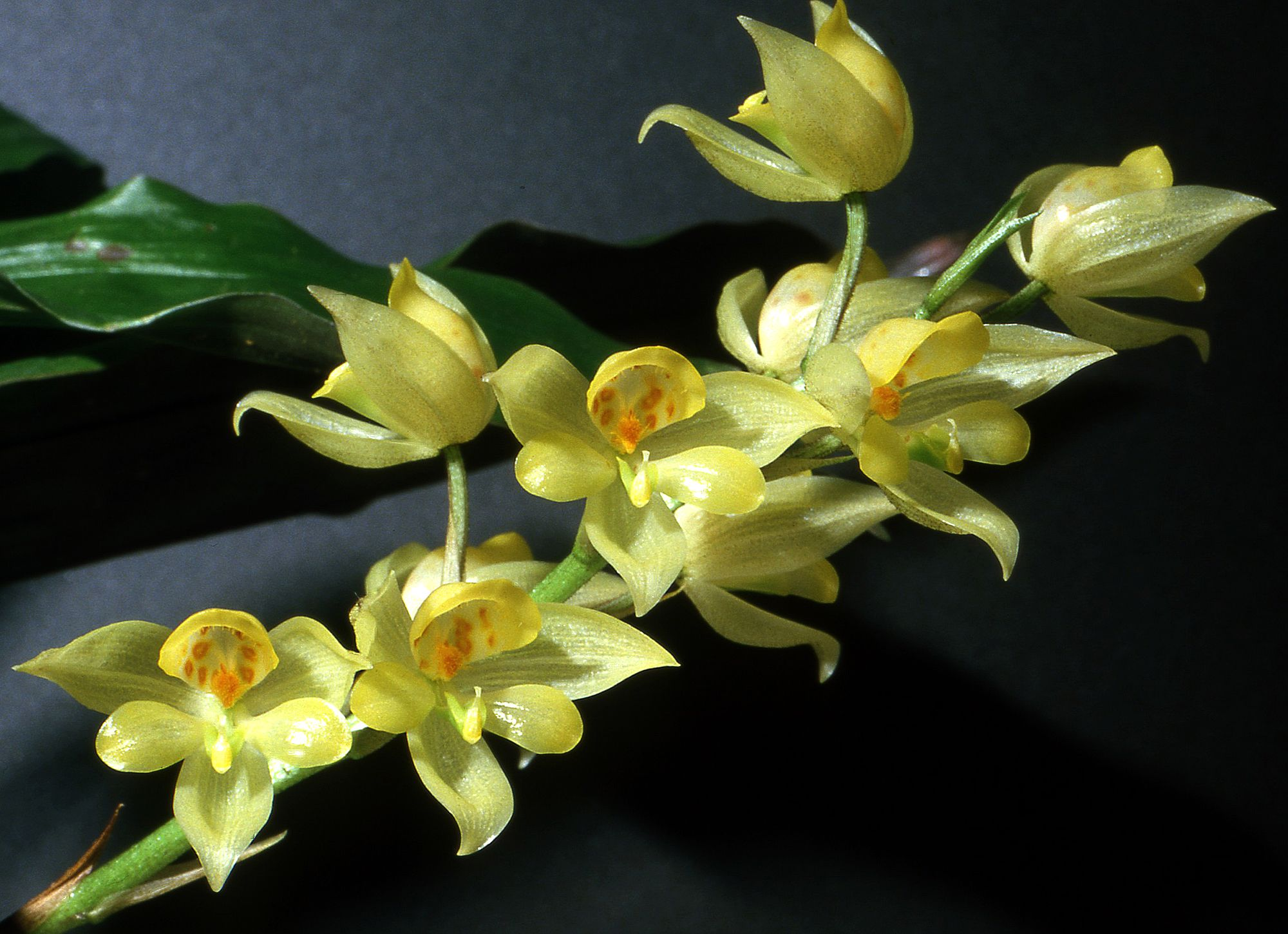
- Soterosanthus shepheardii

Scientific classification
- Kingdom: Plantae
- Clade: Tracheophytes
- Clade: Angiosperms
- Clade: Monocots
- Order: Asparagales
- Family: Orchidaceae
- Subfamily: Epidendroideae
- Tribe: Cymbidieae
- Subtribe: Stanhopeinae
- Genus: Soterosanthus; Lehm. ex Jenny
- Species: S. shepheardii

Binomial name
- Soterosanthus shepheardii (Rolfe) Jenny

Synonyms
- Sievekingia shepheardii Rolfe

= Soterosanthus =

Genus of orchids

Soterosanthus shepheardii is a species of orchid found in Ecuador and Colombia, and the only species of the monotypic genus Soterosanthus. This species segregated from Sievekingia because of its upright inflorescence. Flowers are somewhat similar to Sievekingia as is the plant stature, being on the small side, around 6" tall. Plants are semi-deciduous and warmth tolerant. Grow in small pots of medium grade bark mix under same conditions as for Gongora; shaded light, even moisture, drier in winter. It is a rarely seen relative of Stanhopea.
