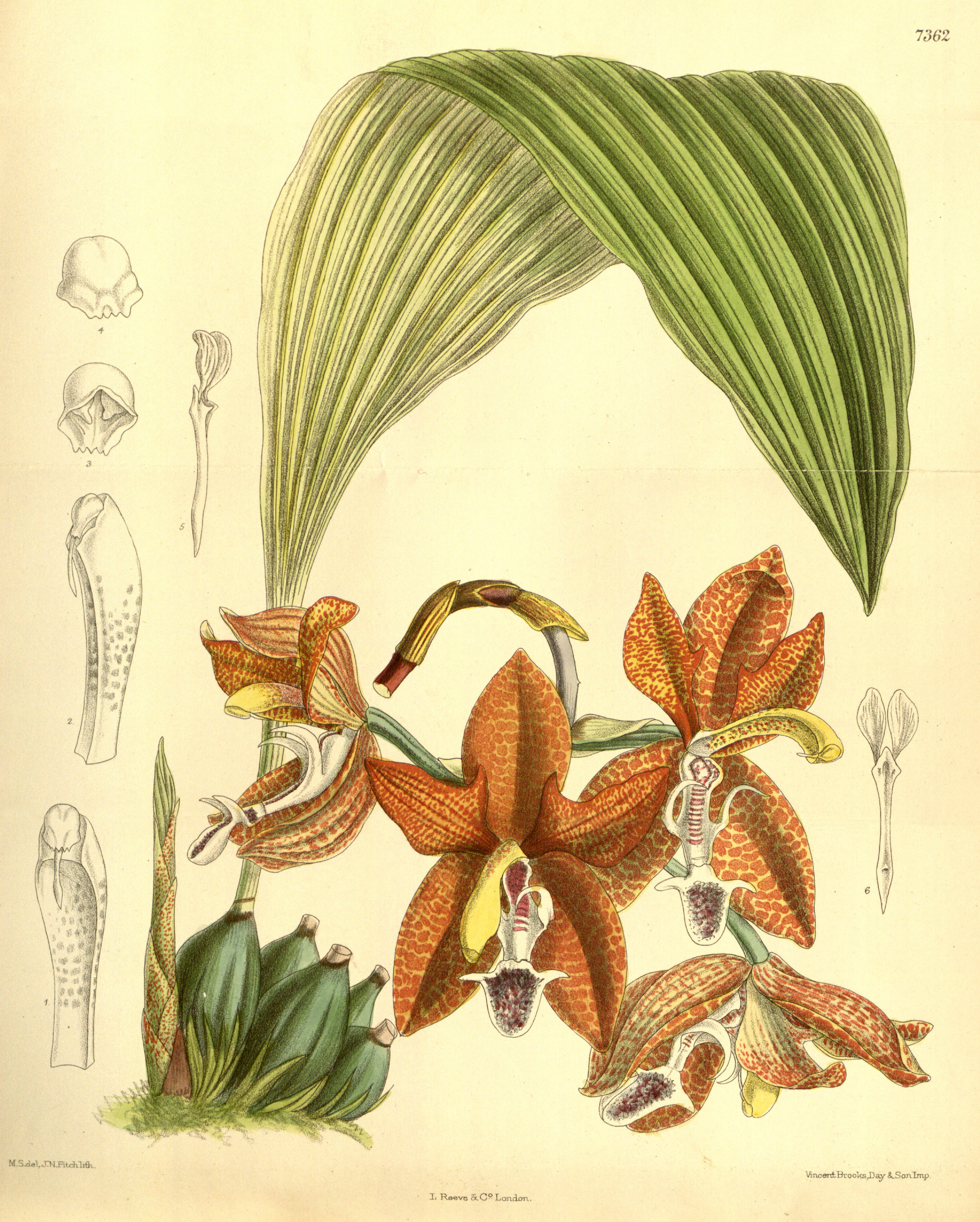

Scientific classification
- Kingdom: Plantae
- Clade: Tracheophytes
- Clade: Angiosperms
- Clade: Monocots
- Order: Asparagales
- Family: Orchidaceae
- Subfamily: Epidendroideae
- Genus: Houlletia
- Species: H. tigrina

Binomial name
- Houlletia tigrina (Linden) Lindl.

Synonyms
- Paphinia tigrina Linden; Houlletia landsbergii Linden & Rchb.f.

= Houlletia tigrina =

Species of orchid

Houlletia tigrina is a species of flowering plant in the family Orchidaceae. This orchid is native to Colombia, Costa Rica, Ecuador, Guatemala, Honduras, Nicaragua, Panama, and Venezuela.
