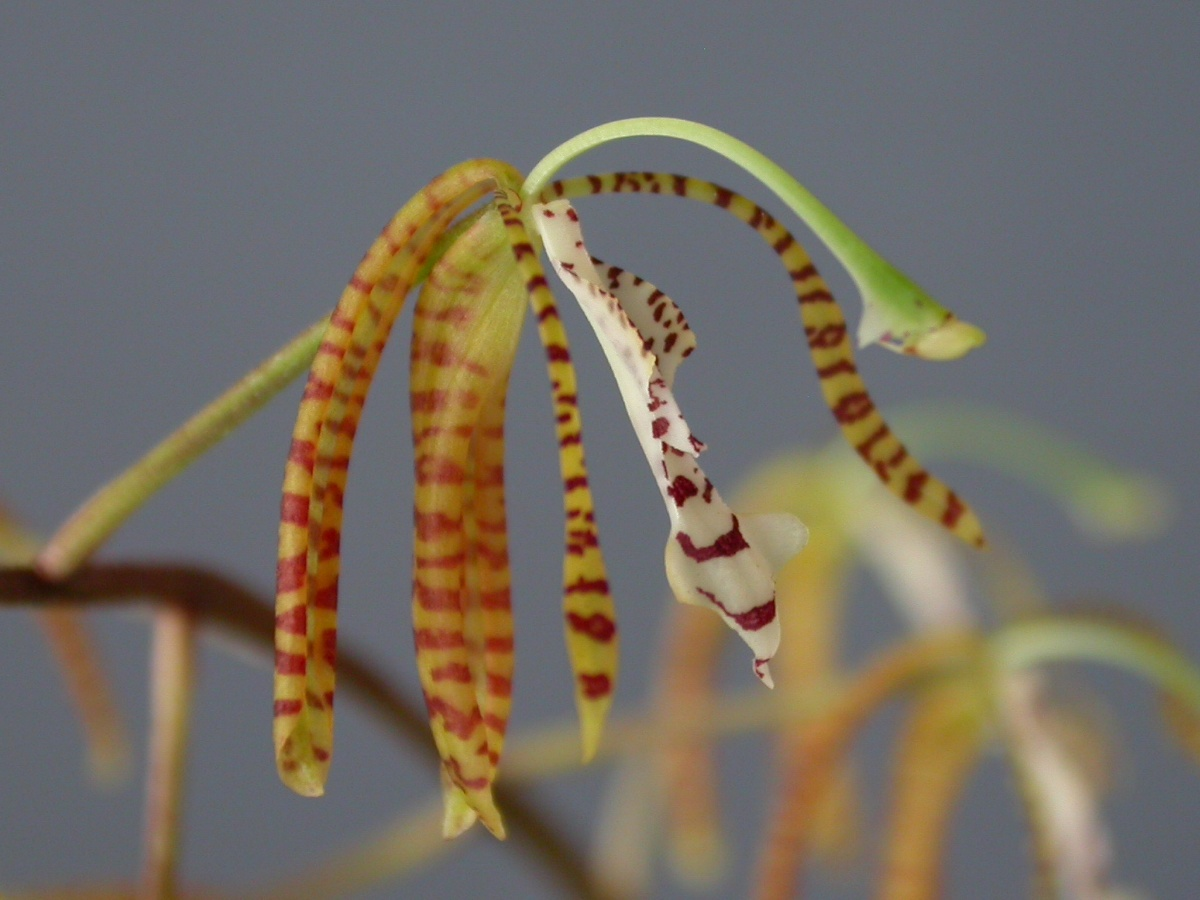

Scientific classification
- Kingdom: Plantae
- Clade: Tracheophytes
- Clade: Angiosperms
- Clade: Monocots
- Order: Asparagales
- Family: Orchidaceae
- Subfamily: Epidendroideae
- Tribe: Cymbidieae
- Subtribe: Stanhopeinae
- Genus: Lueckelia; Jenny
- Species: L. breviloba

Binomial name
- Lueckelia breviloba (Summerh.) Jenny

Synonyms
- Brasilocycnis breviloba (Summerh.) G.Gerlach & Whitten; Polycycnis breviloba Summerh.

= Lueckelia =

Species of flowering plant

Lueckelia is a monotypic genus of flowering plants belonging to the family Orchidaceae. The only species is Lueckelia breviloba (Summerh.) Jenny It is within the Tribe Cymbidieae and Subtribus of Stanhopeinae Benth. (1881).

The species is found in Brazil, Bolivia and Peru.

The genus name of Lueckelia is in honour of Emil Lückel (b. 1927), a German botanist and taxonomist from Frankfurt, who was a specialist in orchids and president of the German Orchid Society. The genus has one known synonym of Brasilocycnis G.Gerlach & Whitten

The Latin specific epithet of breviloba is made of two words; 'brevi-' from brevis meaning short and also 'loba' meaning lobe. Referring to the flower petals being short. Both genus and species were first described and published in Austral. Orchid Rev. Vol.64 (Issue 4) on page 15 in 1999.
