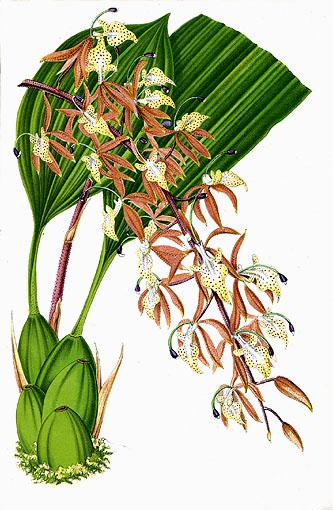
- Polycycnis lepida 1869 illustration

Scientific classification
- Kingdom: Plantae
- Clade: Embryophytes
- Clade: Tracheophytes
- Clade: Spermatophytes
- Clade: Angiosperms
- Clade: Monocots
- Order: Asparagales
- Family: Orchidaceae
- Subfamily: Epidendroideae
- Tribe: Cymbidieae
- Subtribe: Stanhopeinae
- Genus: Polycycnis; Rchb. f.

Type species
- Polycycnis muscifera (Lindl.) Rchb. f.

Synonyms
- Polycycnopsis Szlach.

= Polycycnis =

Genus of orchids

Polycycnis, abbreviated in horticultural trade as Pcn, is a genus of orchid, comprising 17 species found in Central America, and northern South America.

== Species ==
1. Polycycnis acutiloba Schltr. - Colombia
2. Polycycnis annectans Dressler - Ecuador
3. Polycycnis aurita Dressler - Ecuador, Colombia
4. Polycycnis barbata (Lindl.) Rchb.f. - Colombia, Venezuela, Panama, Costa Rica, Honduras
5. Polycycnis blancoi G.Gerlach - Costa Rica
6. Polycycnis escobariana G.Gerlach - Colombia
7. Polycycnis gratiosa Endrés & Rchb.f. - Panama, Costa Rica
8. Polycycnis grayi Dodson - Ecuador
9. Polycycnis lehmannii Rolfe - Colombia
10. Polycycnis lepida Linden & Rchb.f. - Ecuador, Colombia, Peru
11. Polycycnis muscifera (Lindl. & Paxton) Rchb.f. - Colombia, Venezuela, Panama, Costa Rica, Bolivia, Peru, Ecuador
12. Polycycnis pfisteri Senghas, Tagges & G.Gerlach - Colombia
13. Polycycnis silvana F.Barros - Bahia
14. Polycycnis surinamensis C.Schweinf - Panama, Colombia, Venezuela, Ecuador, Suriname, Guyana
15. Polycycnis tortuosa Dressler - Panama
16. Polycycnis trullifera D.E.Benn. & Christenson - Peru
17. Polycycnis villegasiana G.Gerlach - Colombia
