= Vasqueziella =

Scientific classification
- Kingdom: Plantae
- Clade: Tracheophytes
- Clade: Angiosperms
- Clade: Monocots
- Order: Asparagales
- Family: Orchidaceae
- Subfamily: Epidendroideae
- Tribe: Cymbidieae
- Subtribe: Stanhopeinae
- Genus: Vasqueziella; Dodson
- Species: V. boliviana

Binomial name
- Vasqueziella boliviana Dodson

Species of plant

Vasqueziella is a genus of orchids. Only one species is known, Vasqueziella boliviana, native to Peru and Bolivia.
