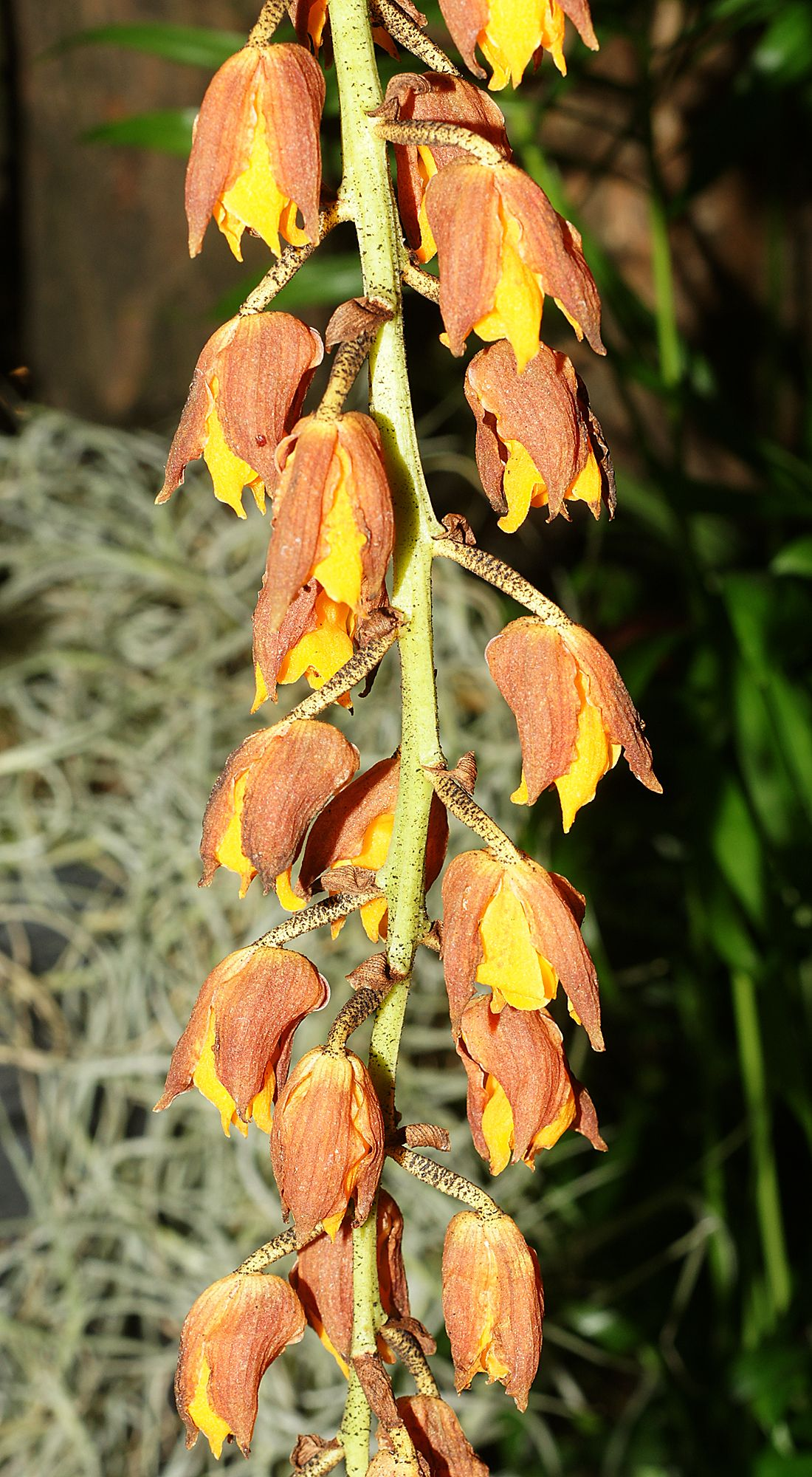
- Lueddemannia pescatorei

Scientific classification
- Kingdom: Plantae
- Clade: Tracheophytes
- Clade: Angiosperms
- Clade: Monocots
- Order: Asparagales
- Family: Orchidaceae
- Subfamily: Epidendroideae
- Tribe: Cymbidieae
- Subtribe: Stanhopeinae
- Genus: Lueddemannia; Linden & Rchb.f.

= Lueddemannia =

Genus of orchids

Lueddemannia is a genus of orchids found from Venezuela to Peru. Three species are currently recognized as of June 2014:

- Lueddemannia dalessandroi (Dodson) G.Gerlach & M.H.Weber - Ecuador
- Lueddemannia pescatorei (Lindl.) Linden & Rchb.f. - Venezuela, Colombia, Ecuador, Peru
- Lueddemannia striata G.Gerlach & M.H.Weber - Peru
