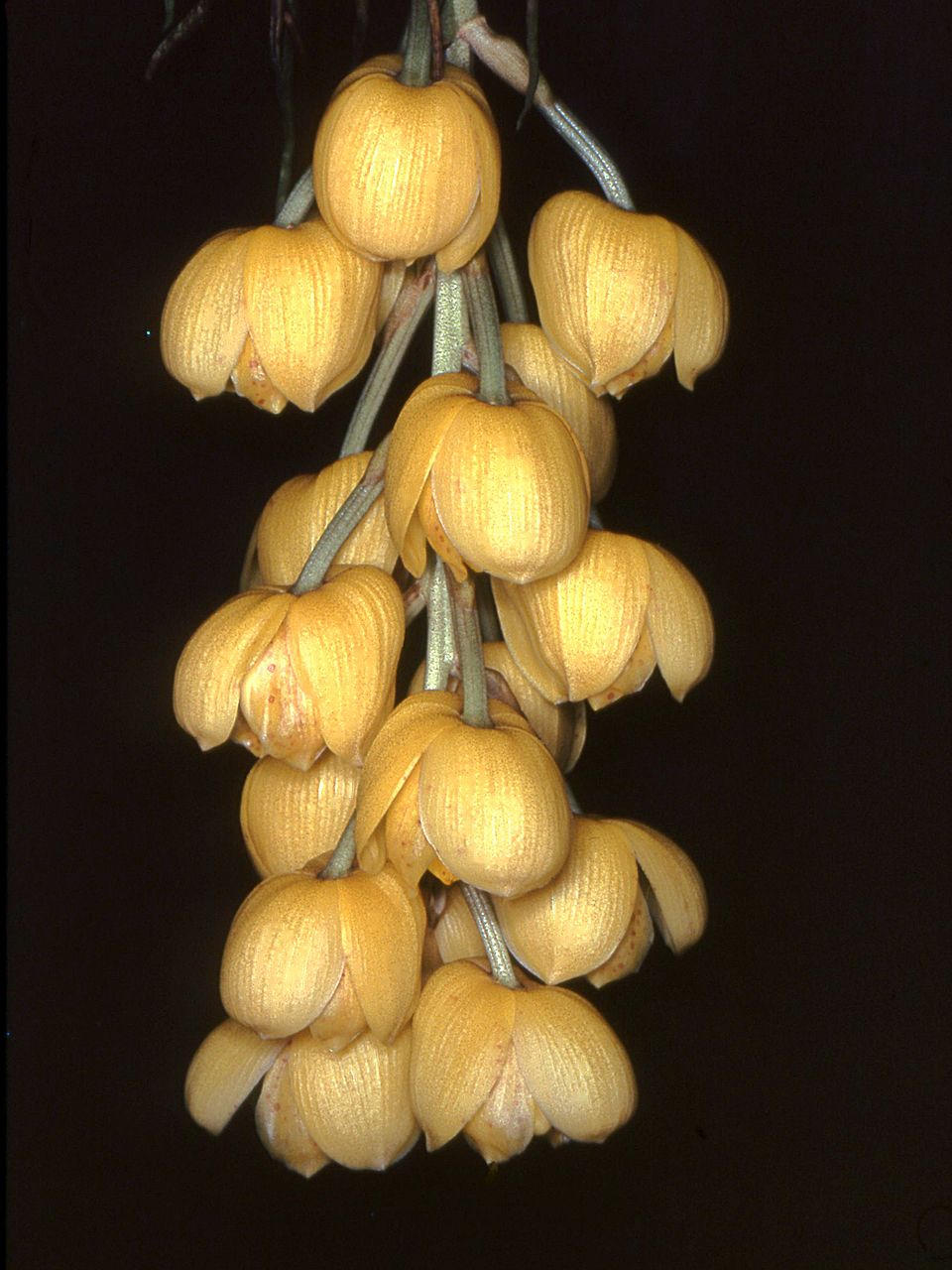

Scientific classification
- Kingdom: Plantae
- Clade: Tracheophytes
- Clade: Angiosperms
- Clade: Monocots
- Order: Asparagales
- Family: Orchidaceae
- Subfamily: Epidendroideae
- Genus: Acineta
- Species: A. chrysantha

Binomial name
- Acineta chrysantha (C.Morren) Lindl. (1850)

Synonyms
- Neippergia chrysantha C. Morren (1849) (Basionym); Acineta warscewiczii Klotzsch (1852)

= Acineta chrysantha =

Species of orchid

Acineta chrysantha is a species of orchid found in the forest of Guatemala, El Salvador, Mexico and Panama.
