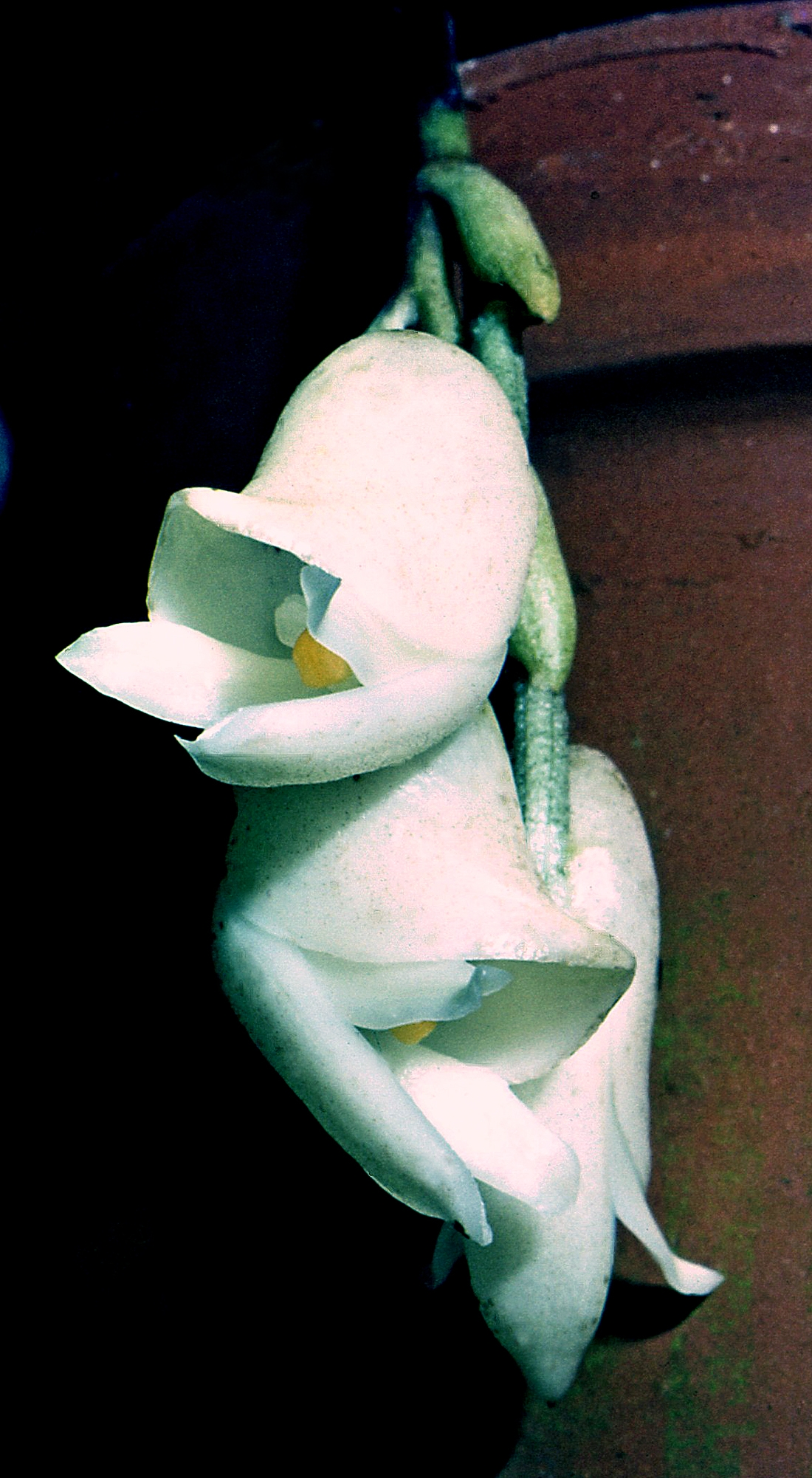
- Schlimia alpina flowers

Scientific classification
- Kingdom: Plantae
- Clade: Tracheophytes
- Clade: Angiosperms
- Clade: Monocots
- Order: Asparagales
- Family: Orchidaceae
- Subfamily: Epidendroideae
- Tribe: Cymbidieae
- Subtribe: Stanhopeinae
- Genus: Schlimia; Planch. & Linden

Synonyms
- Schlimmia, common spelling mistake

= Schlimia =

Genus of orchids

Schlimia is a genus of flowering plants from the orchid family, Orchidaceae. It is native to Costa Rica and to northern South America.

Note. This genus is often incorrectly written as Schlimmia, however it honours the Belgian botanist Louis Joseph Schlim and the author later corrected the name.

As of June 2014, the following species are recognized:

1. Schlimia alpina Rchb.f. & Warsz. - Venezuela, Colombia, Ecuador
2. Schlimia condorana Dodson - Ecuador
3. Schlimia garayana H.R.Sweet - Ecuador
4. Schlimia jasminodora Planch. & Linden - Colombia, Costa Rica
5. Schlimia jennyana Lückel - Peru
6. Schlimia pandurata Schltr. - Colombia
7. Schlimia stevensonii Dodson - Ecuador

== See also ==
- List of Orchidaceae genera
