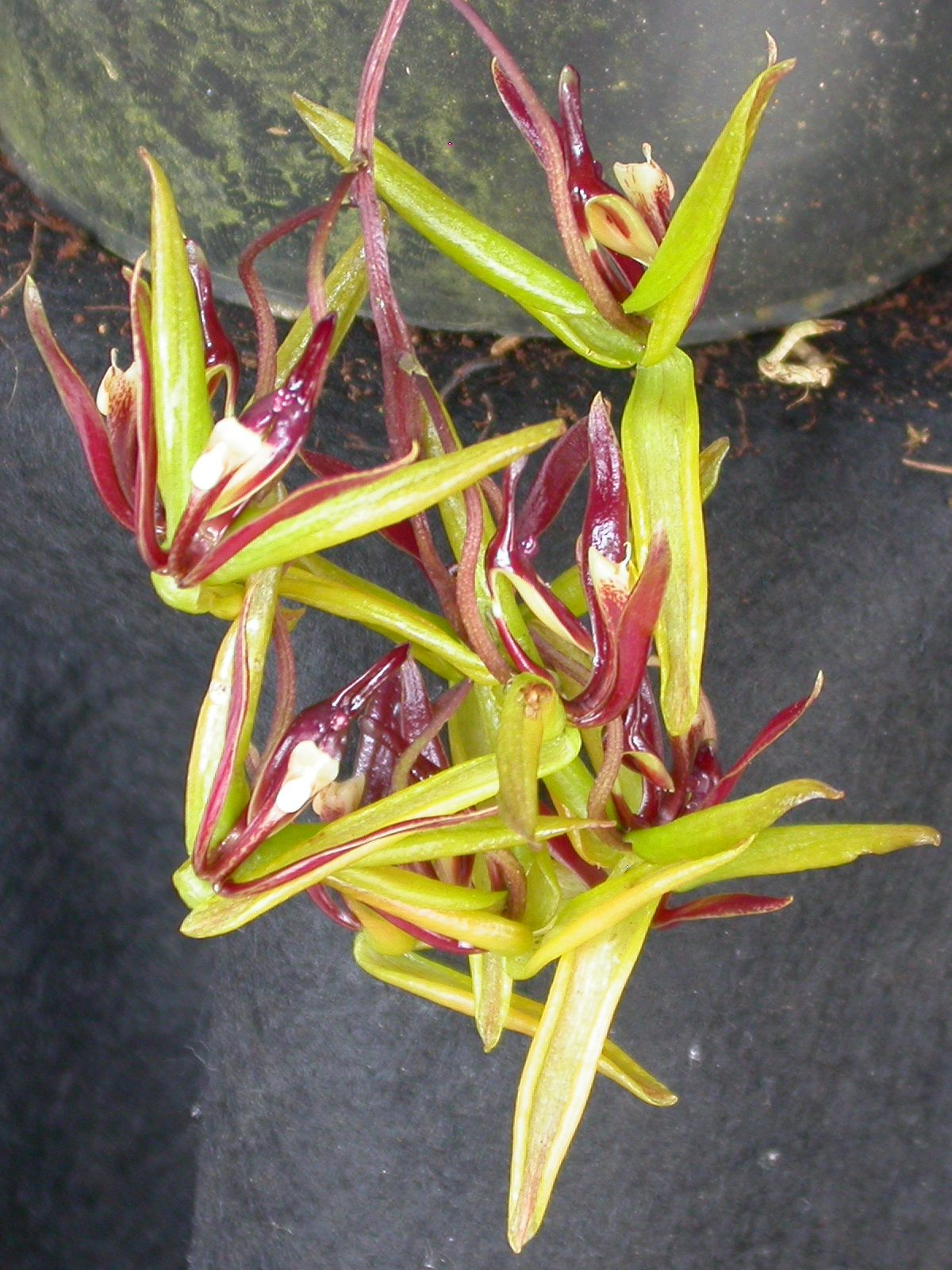

Conservation status
- CITES Appendix II

Scientific classification
- Kingdom: Plantae
- Clade: Tracheophytes
- Clade: Angiosperms
- Clade: Monocots
- Order: Asparagales
- Family: Orchidaceae
- Subfamily: Epidendroideae
- Genus: Cirrhaea
- Species: C. dependens

Binomial name
- Cirrhaea dependens (Lodd.) Loudon (1830)

Synonyms
- Cirrhaea loddigesii; Cymbidium dependens Lodd. (1825) (Basionym); Gongora viridipurpurea (Lindl.) Hook. (1830); Cirrhaea viridipurpurea (Hook.) Lindl. (1832); Cirrhaea tristis Lindl. (1836); Cirrhaea obtusata Lindl. (1837); Cirrhaea pallida Lindl. (1837); Cirrhaea fuscolutea Hook. (1839); Cirrhaea viridipurpurea var. frayana Knowles & Westc. (1839); Cirrhaea violaceovirens Hoffmanns. (1842); Cirrhaea violascens Hoffmanns. (1842); Sarcoglossum suaveolens Beer (1854); Cirrhaea hoffmannseggii Heynh. ex Rchb.f. (1863); Cirrhaea warreana Lindl. ex Rchb.f. (1863); Cirrhaea dependens var. concolor Porsch (1908); Cirrhaea dependens var. tigrina Porsch (1908)

= Cirrhaea dependens =

Species of orchid

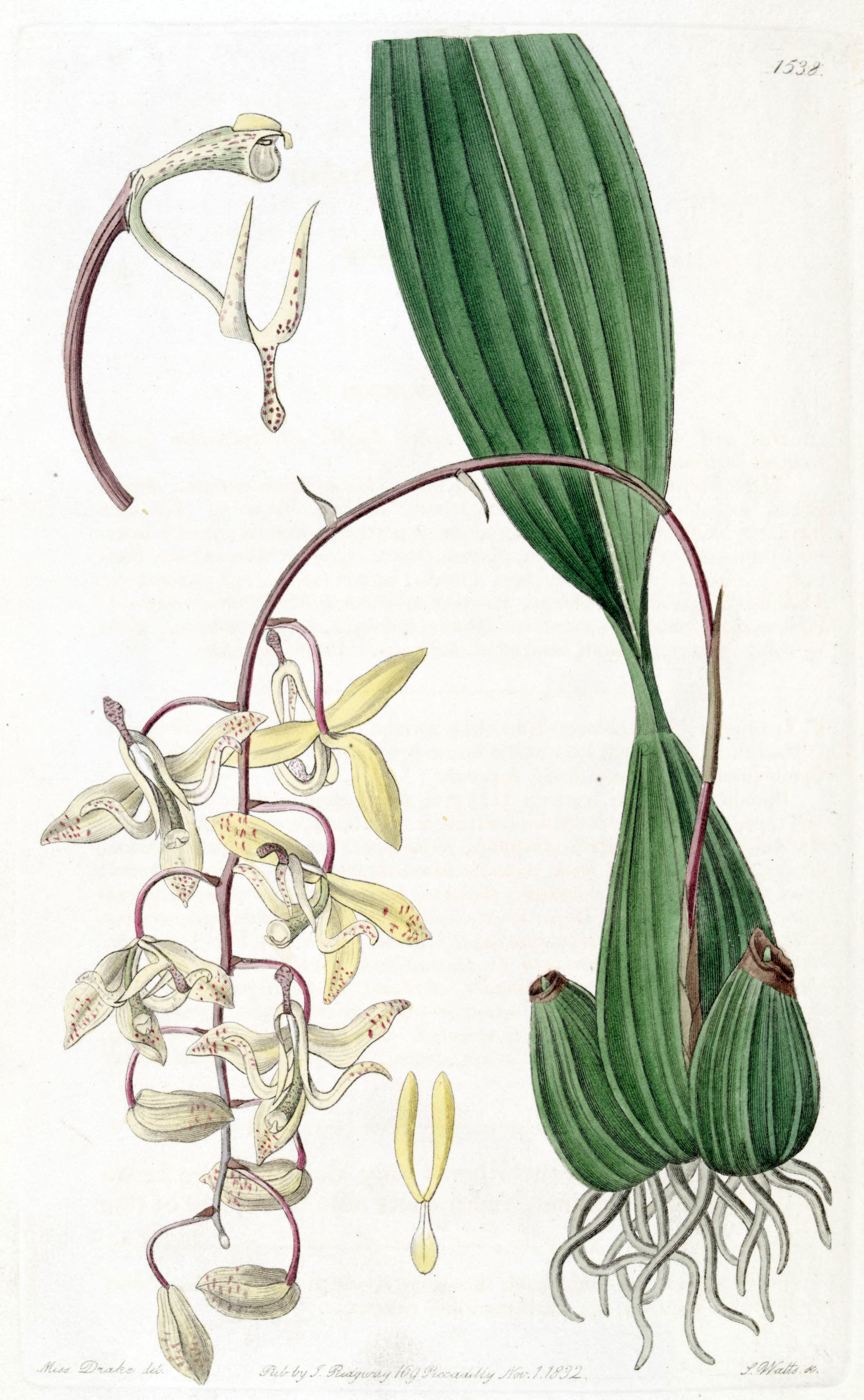
Cirrhaea loddigesii in Edwards vol 18 pl 1538 (1832)

Cirrhaea dependens, also known as Cirrhaea loddigesii, is a species of orchid endemic to Brazil. It is the type species for its genus.
