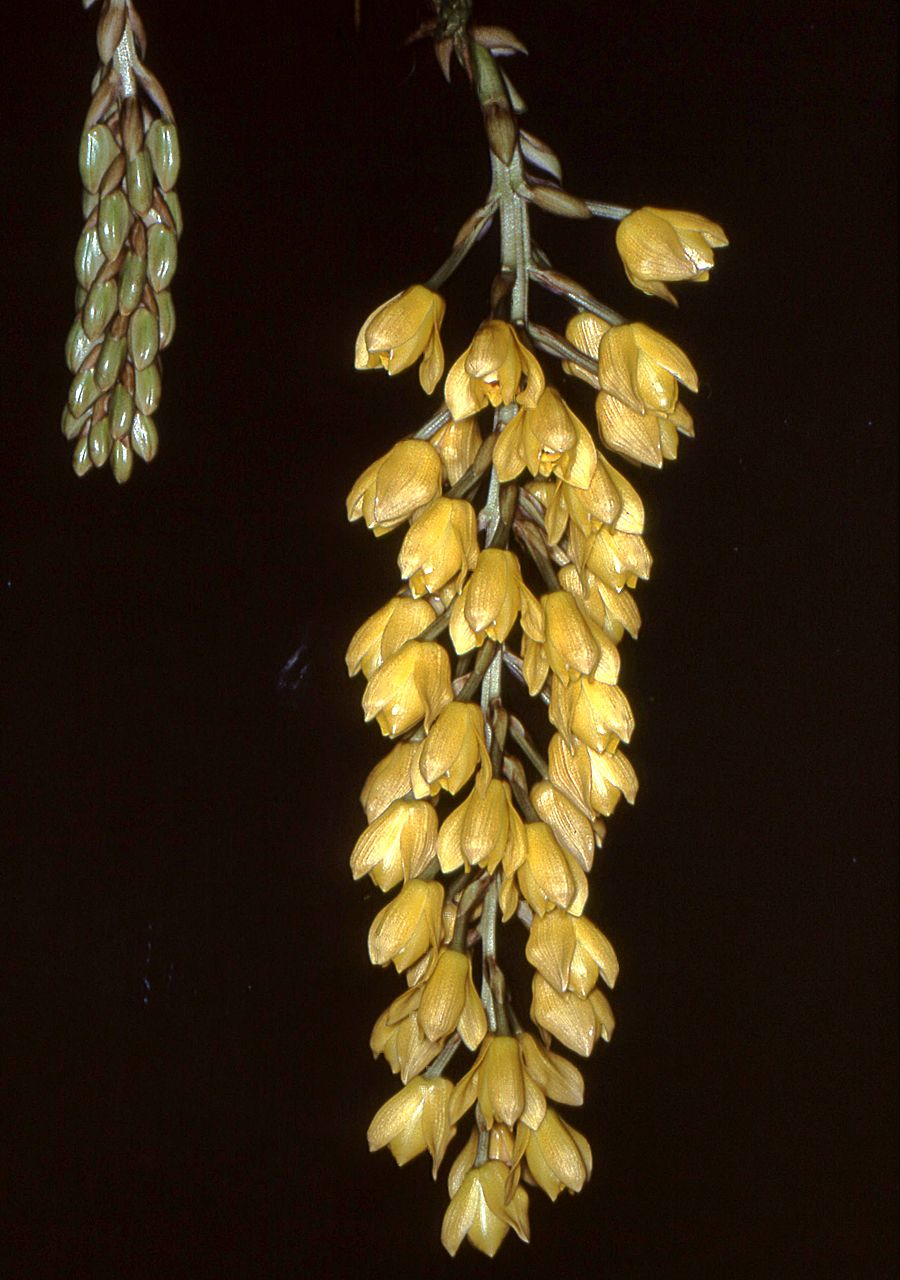

Scientific classification
- Kingdom: Plantae
- Clade: Tracheophytes
- Clade: Angiosperms
- Clade: Monocots
- Order: Asparagales
- Family: Orchidaceae
- Subfamily: Epidendroideae
- Genus: Acineta
- Species: A. barkeri

Binomial name
- Acineta barkeri (Bateman) Lindl. (1843)

Synonyms
- Peristeria barkeri Bateman (1838) (Basionym); Acineta barkeri var. aurantiaca Lem. (1855)

= Acineta barkeri =

Species of orchid

Acineta barkeri is a species of orchid found from Mexico to Guatemala. It is a pseudobulbous epiphyte.
