= Houlletia brocklehurstiana =

Scientific classification
- Kingdom: Plantae
- Clade: Tracheophytes
- Clade: Angiosperms
- Clade: Monocots
- Order: Asparagales
- Family: Orchidaceae
- Subfamily: Epidendroideae
- Genus: Houlletia
- Species: H. brocklehurstiana

Binomial name
- Houlletia brocklehurstiana Lindl.

Synonyms
- Houlletia stapeliiflora Brongn.; Maxillaria brocklehurstiana Lindl.; Houlletia stapelioides Brongn. ex Rchb.f.

Species of orchid

Houlletia brocklehurstiana is a species of orchid native to Brazil (from Rio de Janeiro to Paraná). It is the type species of the genus Houlletia.
