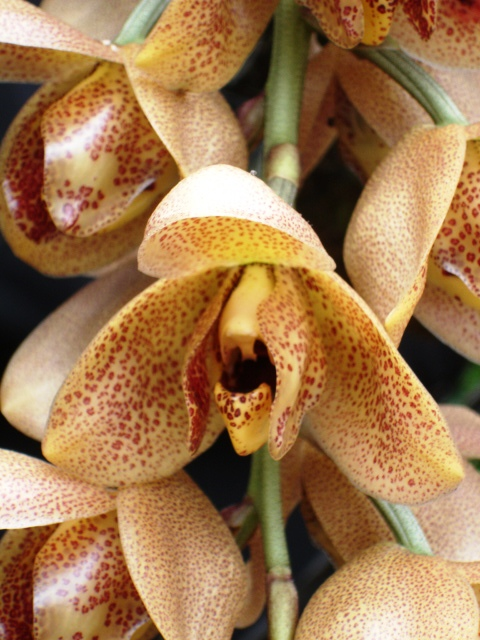

Scientific classification
- Kingdom: Plantae
- Clade: Tracheophytes
- Clade: Angiosperms
- Clade: Monocots
- Order: Asparagales
- Family: Orchidaceae
- Subfamily: Epidendroideae
- Genus: Acineta
- Species: A. superba

Binomial name
- Acineta superba (Kunth) Rchb.f.(1863)

Synonyms
- Anguloa superba Kunth (1816) (Basionym); Acineta humboldtii (Lindl.) Lindl. (1843); Peristeria humboldtii Lindl. (1843); Peristeria humboldtii var. fulva Hook. (1845); Acineta fulva (Hook.) Klotzsch (1852); Acineta humboldtii var. schilleriana Rchb.f. (1855); Acineta schilleriana (Rchb.f.) Rchb.f. (1863); Acineta collosa Sander (1898); Acineta colmanii auct. (1904)

= Acineta superba =

Species of plant

Acineta superba is a species of orchid and the type species of the genus Acineta found in Venezuela, Colombia, Ecuador and Peru.
