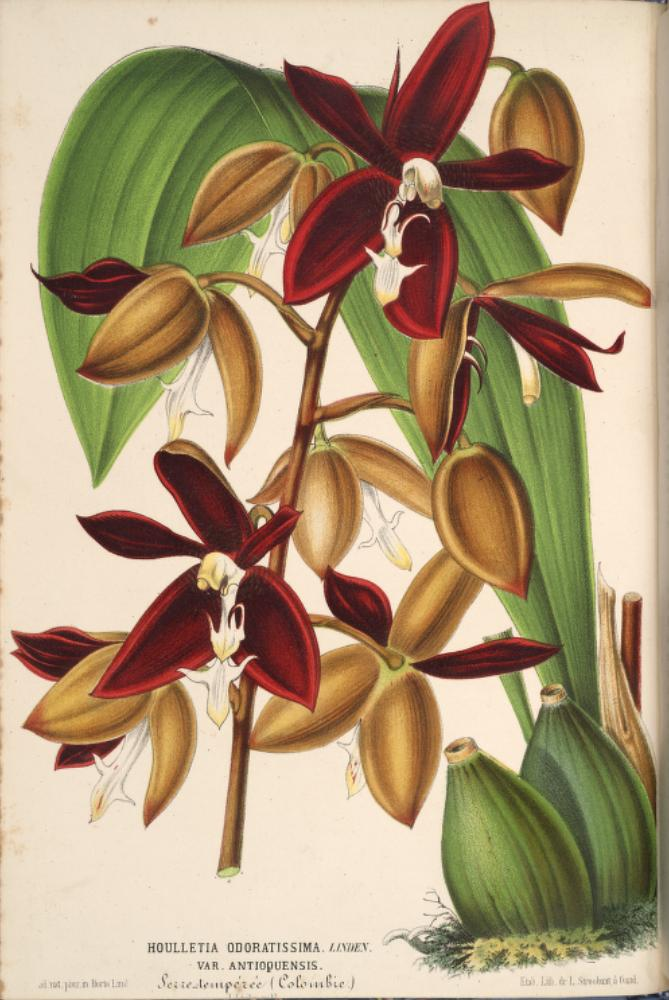

Scientific classification
- Kingdom: Plantae
- Clade: Tracheophytes
- Clade: Angiosperms
- Clade: Monocots
- Order: Asparagales
- Family: Orchidaceae
- Subfamily: Epidendroideae
- Genus: Houlletia
- Species: H. odoratissima

Binomial name
- Houlletia odoratissima Linden

Synonyms
- List: Houlletia antioquensis (André) Ames & Nash; Houlletia boliviana Schltr.; Houlletia buchtienii Kraenzl.; Houlletia juruenensis Hoehne; Houlletia odoratissima var. antioquensis André; Houlletia odoratissima f. antioquiensis (André) O.Gruss & M.Wolff; Houlletia odoratissima var. macrosepala Regel; Houlletia odoratissima f. xanthina (Rchb.f.) O.Gruss & M.Wolff; Houlletia odoratissima var. xanthina Rchb.f.; Houlletia picta Linden

= Houlletia odoratissima =

Species of orchid

Houlletia odoratissima is a species of flowering plant in the family Orchidaceae. This orchid is native to Bolivia, Brazil, Colombia, Ecuador, Guyana, Panama, Peru, and Venezuela.
