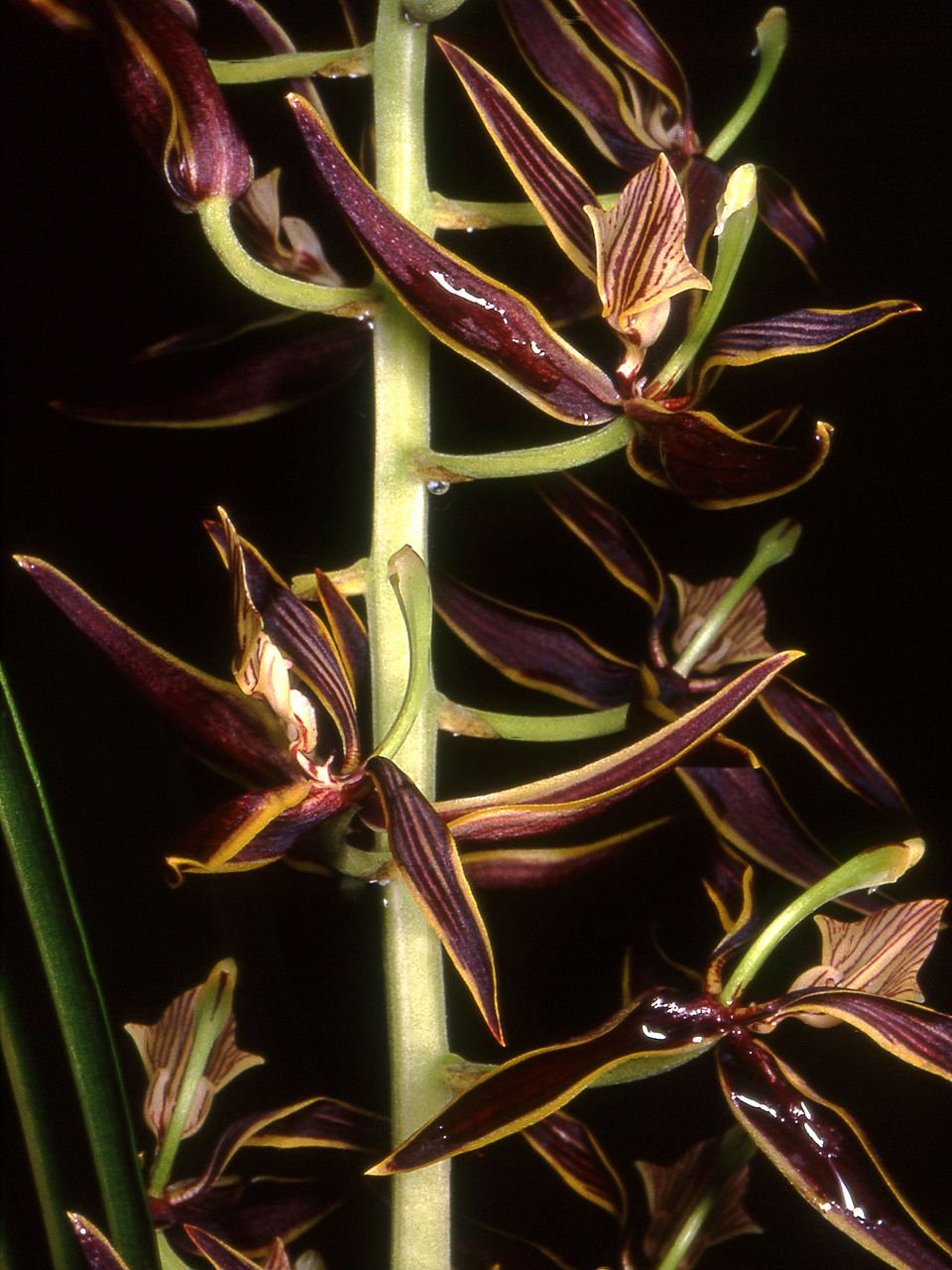

Conservation status
- CITES Appendix II

Scientific classification
- Kingdom: Plantae
- Clade: Tracheophytes
- Clade: Angiosperms
- Clade: Monocots
- Order: Asparagales
- Family: Orchidaceae
- Subfamily: Epidendroideae
- Tribe: Cymbidieae
- Subtribe: Stanhopeinae
- Genus: Braemia; Jenny (1985)
- Species: B. vittata

Binomial name
- Braemia vittata (Lindl.) Jenny (1985)

Synonyms
- Houlletia vittata Lindl. 1841; Polycycnis vittata (Lindl.) Rchb.f. in W.G.Walpers 1863

= Braemia =

Genus of orchids

Braemia vittata is a species of orchid and the only species of genus Braemia. It is found in Colombia, Ecuador, Peru, Venezuela, Brazil, Suriname, Guyana, and French Guiana.
