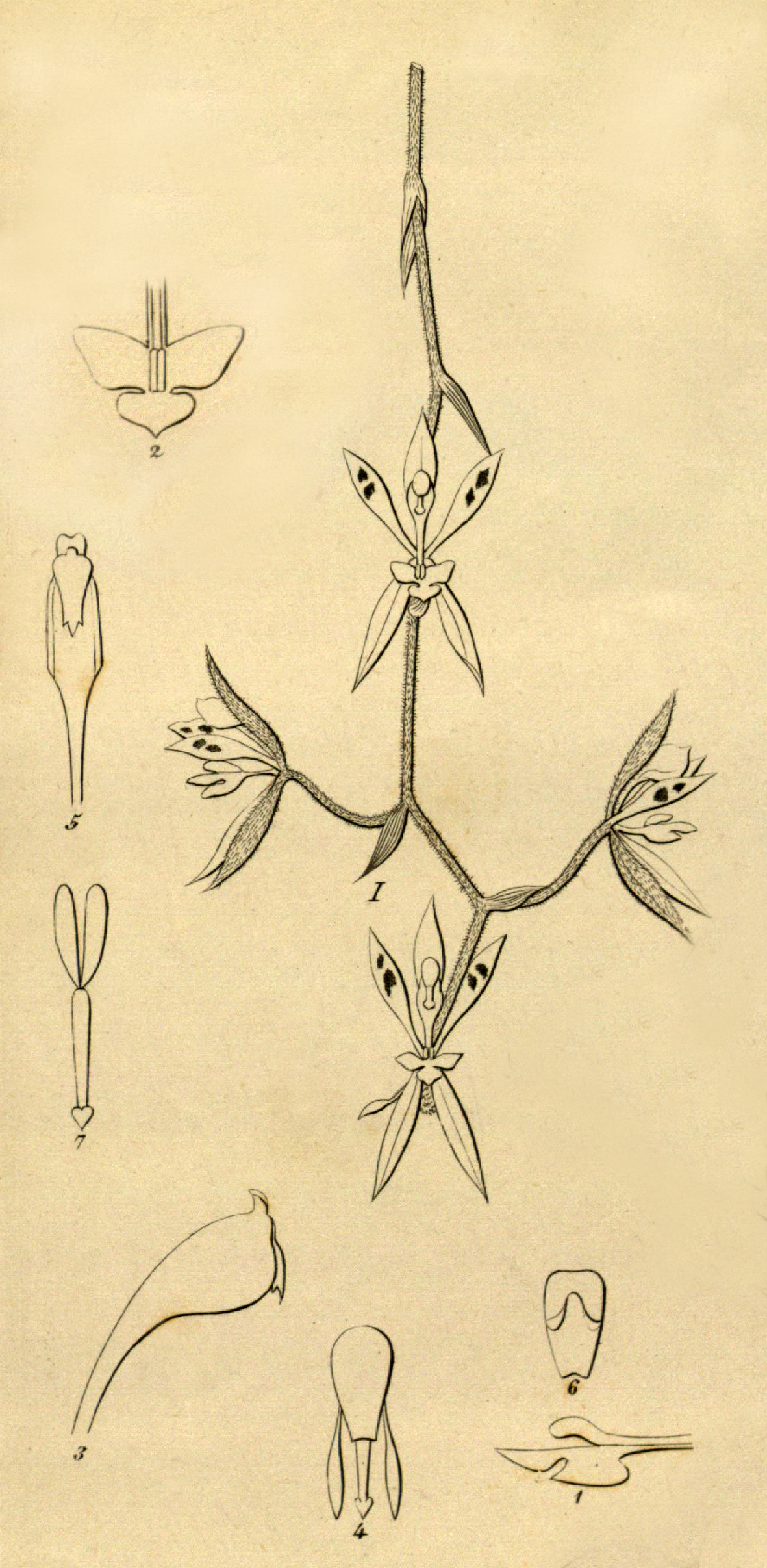

Scientific classification
- Kingdom: Plantae
- Clade: Tracheophytes
- Clade: Angiosperms
- Clade: Monocots
- Order: Asparagales
- Family: Orchidaceae
- Subfamily: Epidendroideae
- Tribe: Cymbidieae
- Subtribe: Stanhopeinae
- Genus: Kegeliella; Mansf.

Synonyms
- Kegelia Rchb. f. 1852, illegitimate homonym, not Sch. Bip. 1848 (Asteraceae)

= Kegeliella =

Genus of orchids

Kegeliella is a genus of orchids native to Mesoamerica, Trinidad, and northern South America.

Species

1. Kegeliella atropilosa - Veracruz to Panama
2. Kegeliella houtteana - Trinidad, Venezuela, Suriname, French Guiana, Amapá
3. Kegeliella kupperi - Costa Rica, Panama, Colombia, Venezuela
4. Kegeliella orientalis - Venezuela
