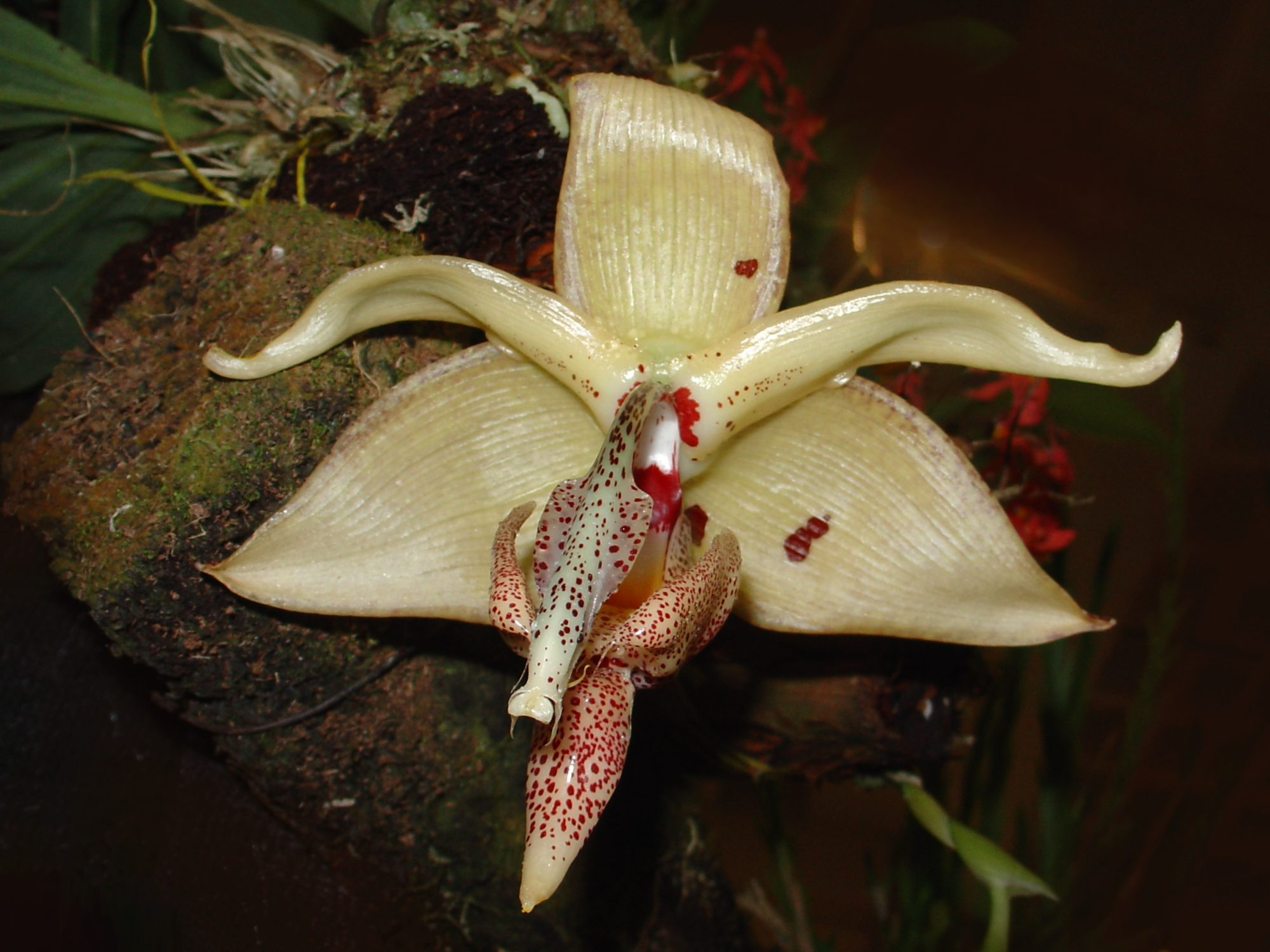
- Embreea rodigasiana

Scientific classification
- Kingdom: Plantae
- Clade: Tracheophytes
- Clade: Angiosperms
- Clade: Monocots
- Order: Asparagales
- Family: Orchidaceae
- Subfamily: Epidendroideae
- Tribe: Cymbidieae
- Subtribe: Stanhopeinae
- Genus: Embreea; Dodson

Type species
- Embreea rodigasiana (Claes ex Cogn.) Dodson (1980)

= Embreea =

Genus of orchids

Embreea is a genus of orchids native to Colombia and Ecuador. The genus Embreea is abbreviated as Emb in horticultural trade. There at present (June 2014) two recognized species:

- Embreea herrenhusana (Jenny) Jenny (2002) - Ecuador (syn Embreea rodigasiana var. herrenhusana Jenny (2001))
- Embreea rodigasiana (Claes ex Cogn.) Dodson (1980) - Colombia (syn Stanhopea rodigasiana Claes ex Cogn. (1897))
