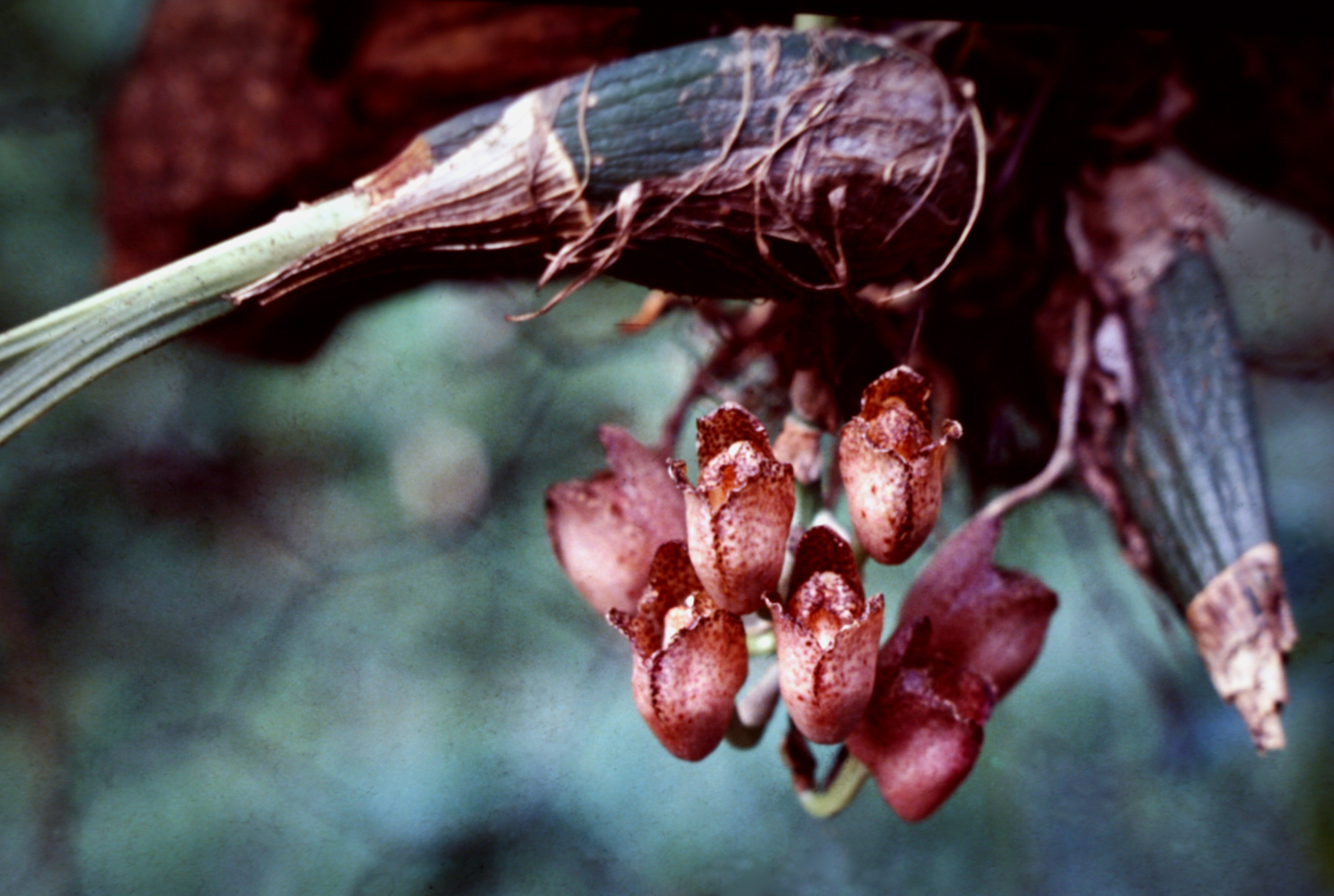
- Habitus

Scientific classification
- Kingdom: Plantae
- Clade: Tracheophytes
- Clade: Angiosperms
- Clade: Monocots
- Order: Asparagales
- Family: Orchidaceae
- Subfamily: Epidendroideae
- Genus: Peristeria
- Species: P. guttata

Binomial name
- Peristeria guttata Knowles & Westc.

Synonyms
- Lycomormium minus Kraenzl.

= Peristeria guttata =

Species of orchid

Peristeria guttata is a species of orchid native to Central and South America.
