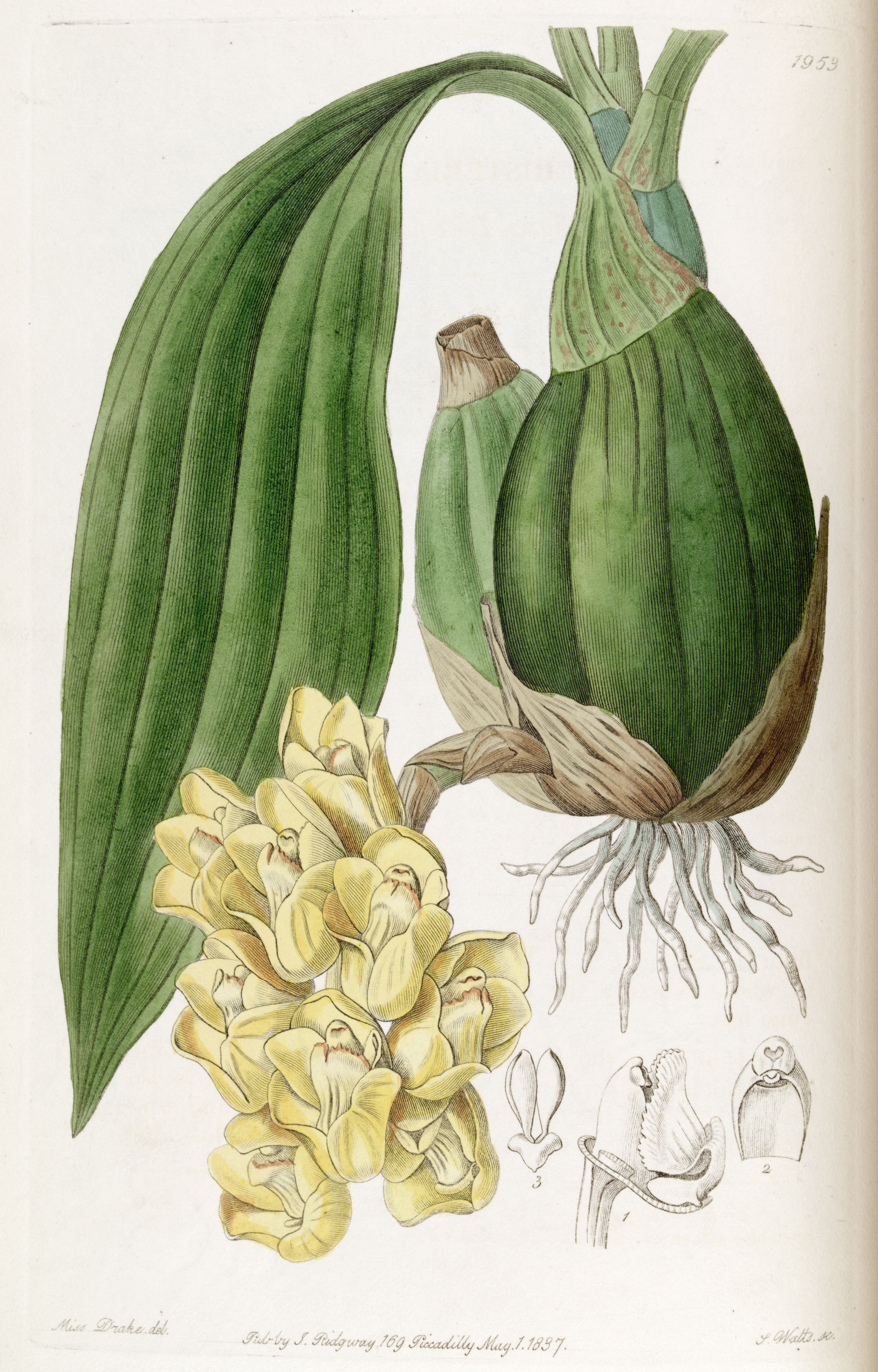
- Illustration of Peristeria cerina

Scientific classification
- Kingdom: Plantae
- Clade: Embryophytes
- Clade: Tracheophytes
- Clade: Spermatophytes
- Clade: Angiosperms
- Clade: Monocots
- Order: Asparagales
- Family: Orchidaceae
- Subfamily: Epidendroideae
- Genus: Peristeria
- Species: P. cerina

Binomial name
- Peristeria cerina Lindl.

Synonyms
- Lycomormium cerinum (Lindl.) Benth.; Lycomormium minus Kraenzl.

= Peristeria cerina =

Species of orchid

Peristeria cerina is a species of orchid occurring from Trinidad to northeastern Brazil.
