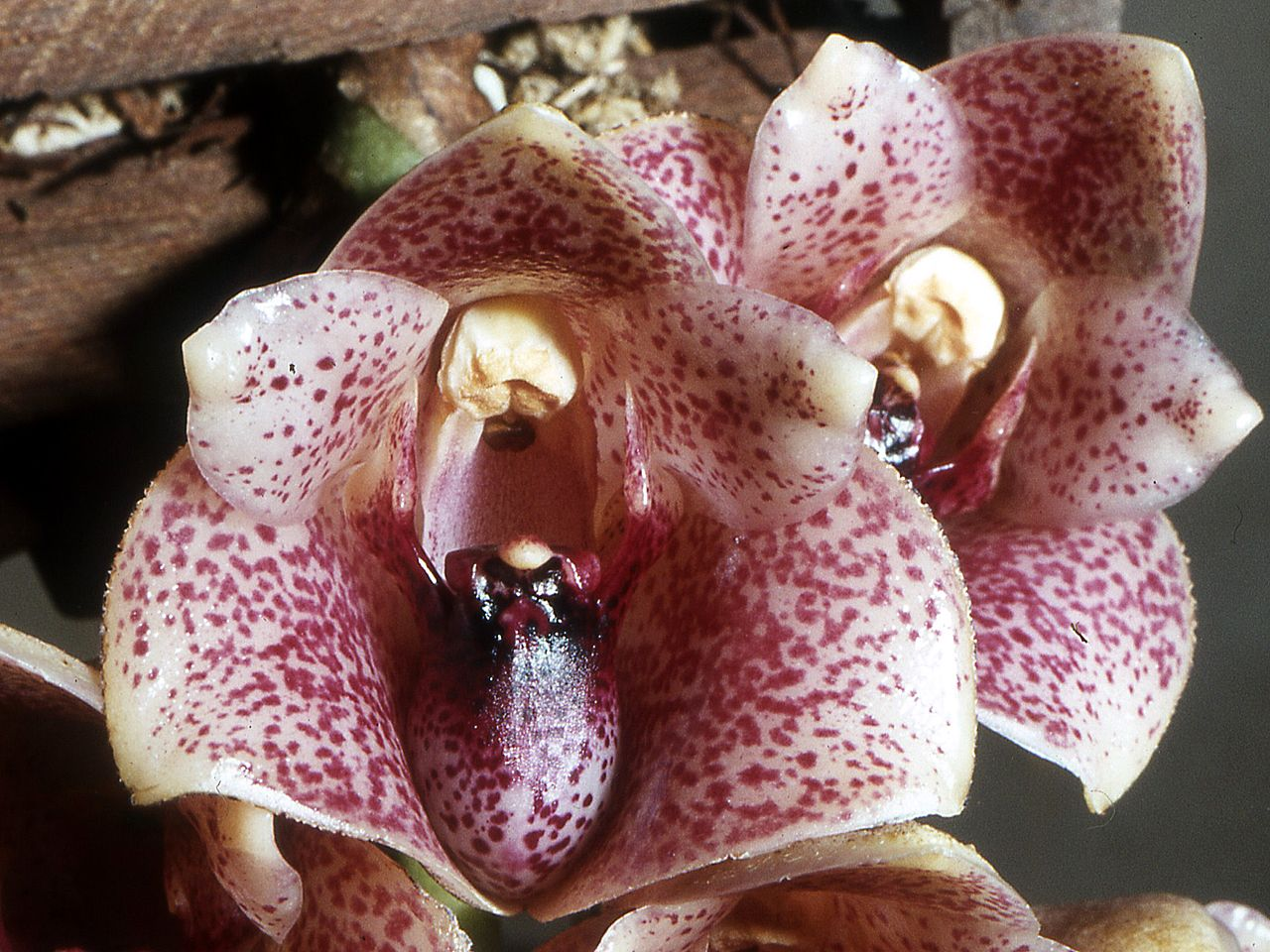
- Lycomormium squalidum

Scientific classification
- Kingdom: Plantae
- Clade: Tracheophytes
- Clade: Angiosperms
- Clade: Monocots
- Order: Asparagales
- Family: Orchidaceae
- Subfamily: Epidendroideae
- Tribe: Cymbidieae
- Subtribe: Coeliopsidinae
- Genus: Lycomormium; Rchb. f.

Type species
- Lycomormium squalidum

= Lycomormium =

Genus of orchids

Lycomormium is a genus of orchids.

== Species ==
There are 5 currently recognized species found in Colombia, Ecuador and Peru.

Image	Scientific name	Distribution	Elevation (m)
	Lycomormium ecuadorense H.R.Sweet	Ecuador	1,100–2,000 metres (3,600–6,600 ft)
	Lycomormium elatum C.Schweinf.	Peru	900–1,500 metres (3,000–4,900 ft)
	Lycomormium fiskei H.R.Sweet	Ecuador, Peru	1,000–1,850 metres (3,280–6,070 ft)
	Lycomormium schmidtii A.Fernández	Colombia	
	Lycomormium squalidum (Poepp. & Endl.) Rchb.f.	Ecuador, Peru, Colombia	1,000–1,850 metres (3,280–6,070 ft)
