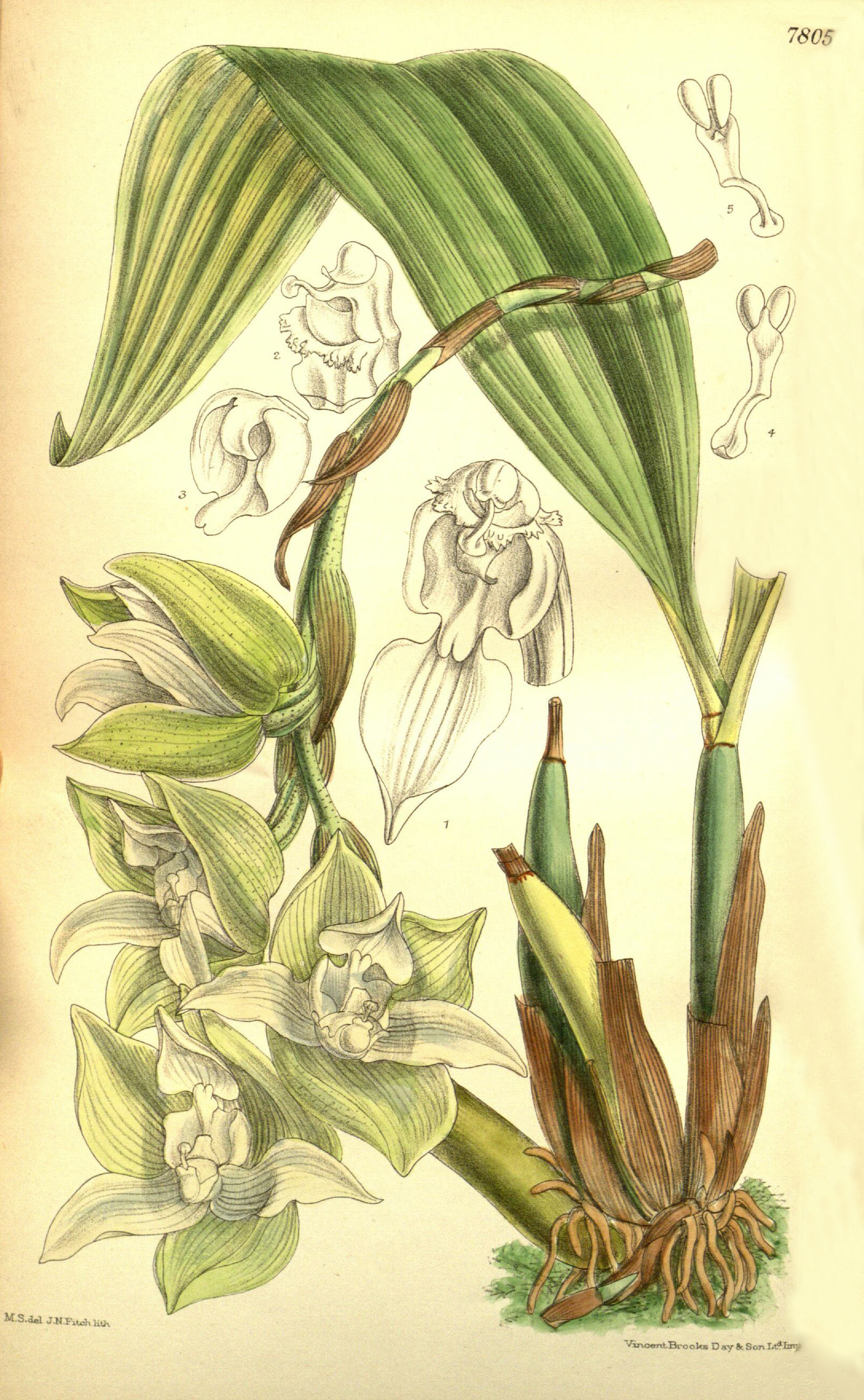
- Trevoria chloris 1900 illustration

Scientific classification
- Kingdom: Plantae
- Clade: Tracheophytes
- Clade: Angiosperms
- Clade: Monocots
- Order: Asparagales
- Family: Orchidaceae
- Subfamily: Epidendroideae
- Tribe: Cymbidieae
- Subtribe: Stanhopeinae
- Genus: Trevoria; F.Lehm. (1897)

Type species
- Trevoria chloris F.Lehm.

Synonyms
- Endresiella Schltr.

= Trevoria =

Genus of orchids

Trevoria is a genus of orchids native to southeastern Central America and northwestern South America. It grows in intermediate temperature and is found from Nicaragua and Costa Rica to Bolivia.

Trevoria was described by FC Lehmann in 1897. A photo of this single plant is also in the new vol 6 of the book Native Colombian Orchids: Volume 6: Supplement: Leucohyle-Zootrophion (1998). The name is in honor of Sir Trevor Lawrence a specialist in orchids who at the time maintained one of the finest collections of orchids in England at his home Burford Lodge, in Surrey, and a former president of The Royal Horticultural Society.

== Species ==
Species recognized as of June 2014:

1. Trevoria chloris Lehm. - Colombia
2. Trevoria escobariana Garay - Colombia, Ecuador
3. Trevoria glumacea Garay - Costa Rica, Nicaragua
4. Trevoria lehmannii Rolfe - Colombia, Ecuador
5. Trevoria zahlbruckneriana (Schltr.) Garay - Costa Rica, Nicaragua, Ecuador, Bolivia
