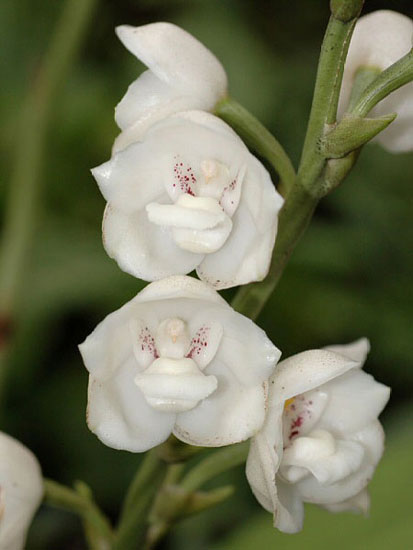
- Flower of Peristeria elata

Conservation status
- CITES Appendix I

Scientific classification
- Kingdom: Plantae
- Clade: Tracheophytes
- Clade: Angiosperms
- Clade: Monocots
- Order: Asparagales
- Family: Orchidaceae
- Subfamily: Epidendroideae
- Genus: Peristeria
- Species: P. elata

Binomial name
- Peristeria elata Hook.

= Peristeria elata =

Species of orchid

Peristeria elata is a species of orchid occurring from Central America to Panama, Venezuela, and Ecuador. It is the type species of its genus. It is commonly referred to as the Holy Ghost orchid, dove orchid, or flower of the Holy Spirit in English, and, as the flor del Espiritu Santo in Spanish.

== Description ==
It has ovoid pseudobulbs up to 12 cm (4.7 in) high, elongated, not fat and with four leaves that reach up to one meter of length and 15 cm (5.9 in) of width, folded. Flowers emerge from the base of the bulb and produce 4 to 12 flowers with an intense marble white color and purple spots. The anther and pistil are yellow. The central part of the flower has a well-defined dove shape. Its perfume is similar to beer. It blooms between July and October.

== Range ==
The epiphyte is found in Central and north-western South America and South India; it ranges from Costa Rica to Peru.

== Habitat ==
In Panama this species has been abundant in the very humid mountain forests. It is found as an epiphyte plant on the trunks of trees covered with moss at elevation of about 1,100 m. In its natural habitat, this orchid grows near the ground level of mature forests.

== Conservation status ==
This flower is in grave danger of extinction; because of its beauty, traffickers take it away from its habitat. The Panamanian NGO APROVACA runs a sponsorship program for this orchid to save it from extinction. It is included on Appendix I of the Convention on International Trade in Endangered Species (CITES), meaning commercial international trade in wild-sourced specimens is prohibited.

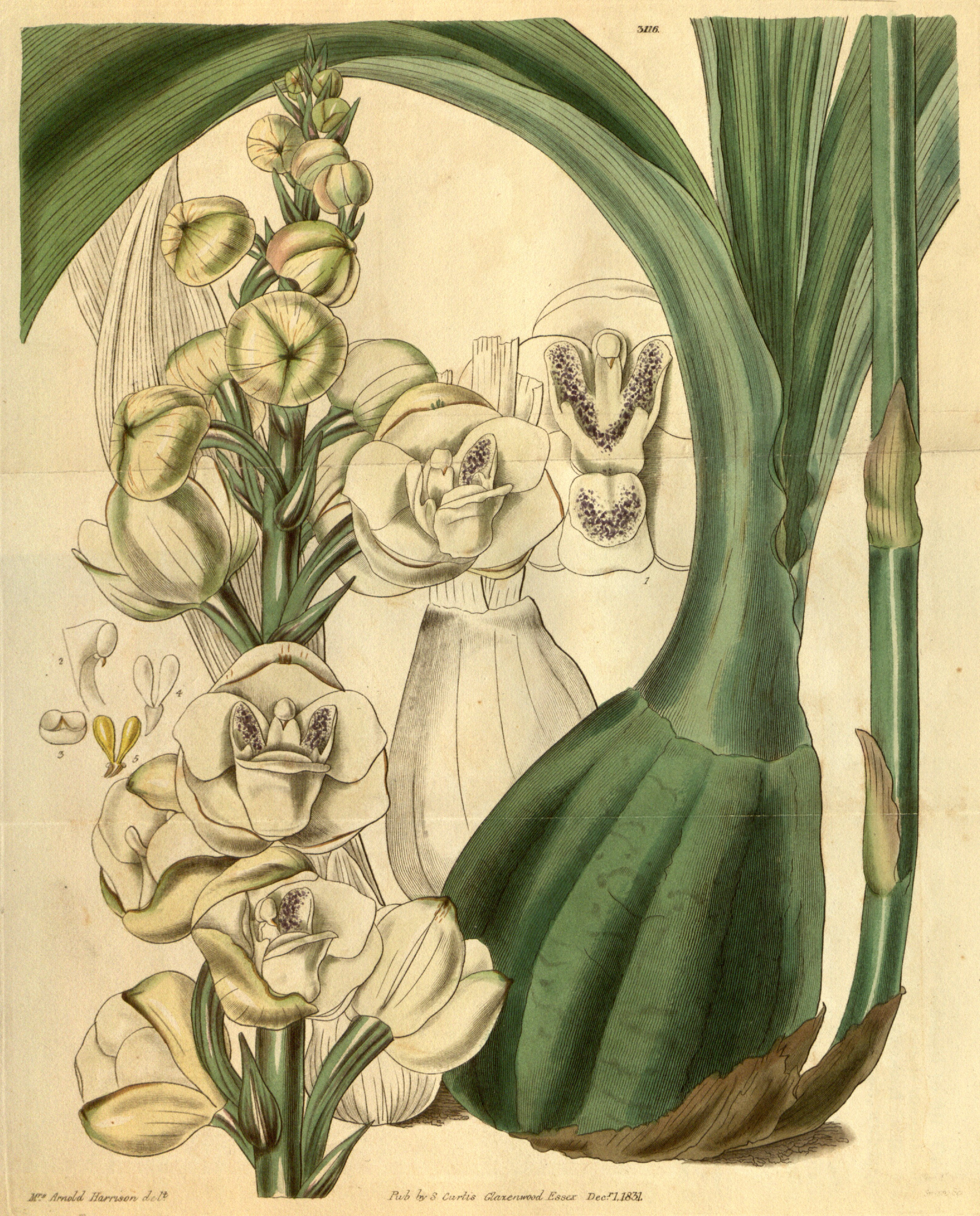
Illustration.

== National flower of Panama ==
Since 1936, this orchid is the national flower of the Republic of Panama declared in the Flower Festival.
