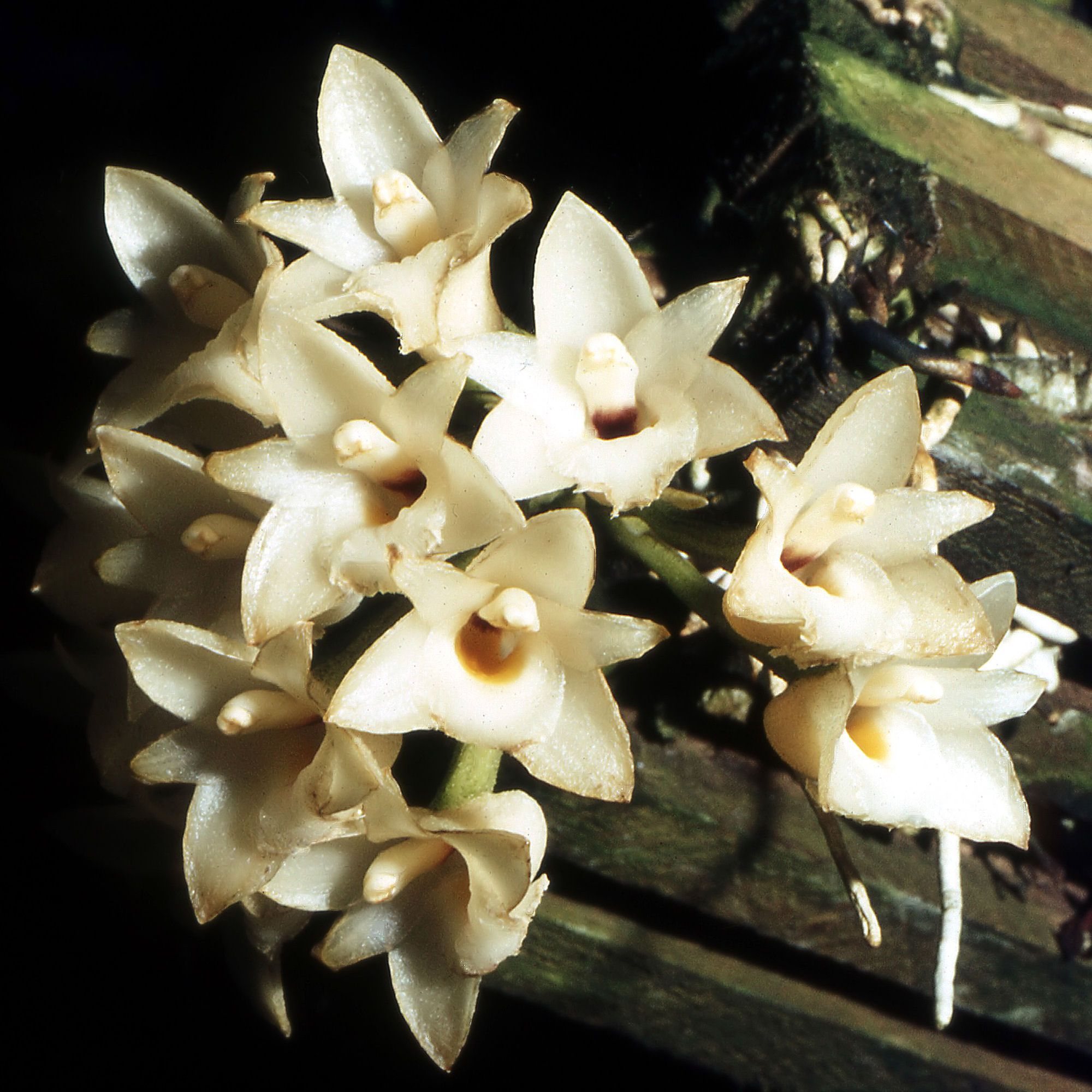

Scientific classification
- Kingdom: Plantae
- Clade: Tracheophytes
- Clade: Angiosperms
- Clade: Monocots
- Order: Asparagales
- Family: Orchidaceae
- Subfamily: Epidendroideae
- Tribe: Cymbidieae
- Subtribe: Coeliopsidinae
- Genus: Coeliopsis; Rchb. f.
- Species: C. hyacinthosma

Binomial name
- Coeliopsis hyacinthosma Rchb. f.

= Coeliopsis =

Genus of orchids

Coeliopsis is a genus of orchids. The sole species is Coeliopsis hyacinthosma, native to Costa Rica, Panama, Colombia and Ecuador.
