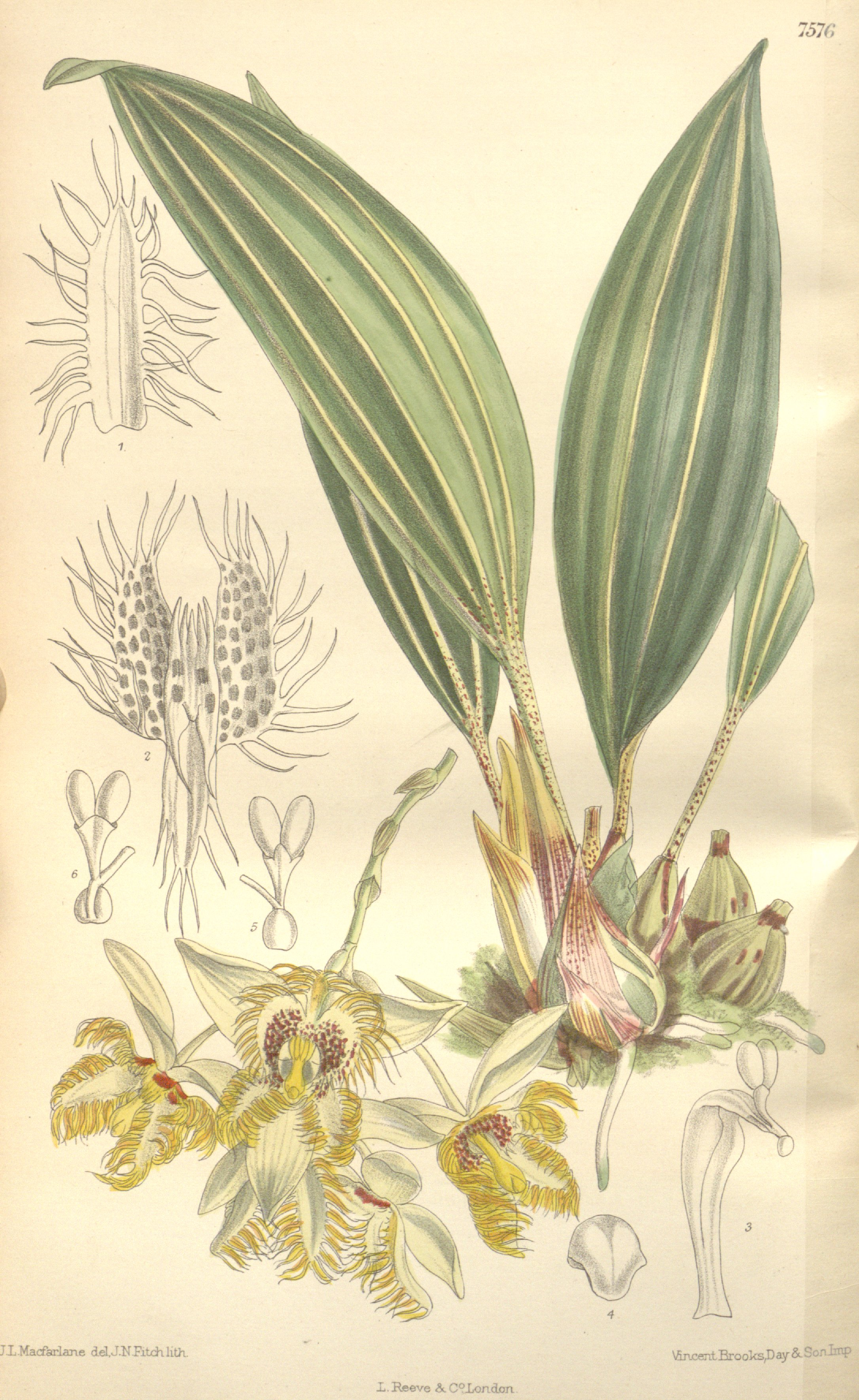
- Sievekingia reichenbachiana 1898 illustration

Scientific classification
- Kingdom: Plantae
- Clade: Tracheophytes
- Clade: Angiosperms
- Clade: Monocots
- Order: Asparagales
- Family: Orchidaceae
- Subfamily: Epidendroideae
- Tribe: Cymbidieae
- Subtribe: Stanhopeinae
- Genus: Sievekingia; Rchb. f. (1871)

Type species
- Sievekingia suavis Rchb. f. (1871)

Synonyms
- Gorgoglossum F. Lehm.

= Sievekingia =

Genus of orchids

Sievekingia is a genus of orchid, comprising 20 species found in Central and South America, from Nicaragua east to the Guianas and south to Bolivia.

The following species are recognized as of June 2014:

1. Sievekingia butcheri Dressler – Panama
2. Sievekingia colombiana Garay – Colombia, Ecuador
3. Sievekingia cristata Garay – Ecuador
4. Sievekingia dunstervilleorum Foldats – Venezuela
5. Sievekingia filifera Dressler – Colombia
6. Sievekingia fimbriata Rchb.f. – Panama, Costa Rica
7. Sievekingia herklotziana Jenny – Colombia
8. Sievekingia herrenhusana Jenny – Ecuador
9. Sievekingia hirtzii Waldv. – Ecuador
10. Sievekingia jenmanii Rchb.f. – Venezuela, the Guianas
11. Sievekingia marsupialis Dodson – Colombia, Ecuador
12. Sievekingia peruviana Rolfe ex C.Schweinf. – Peru
13. Sievekingia reichenbachiana Rolfe – Colombia, Ecuador
14. Sievekingia rhonhofiae Mansf. – Ecuador
15. Sievekingia suavis Rchb.f. – Panama, Costa Rica, Nicaragua, Colombia
16. Sievekingia trollii Mansf. – Bolivia
