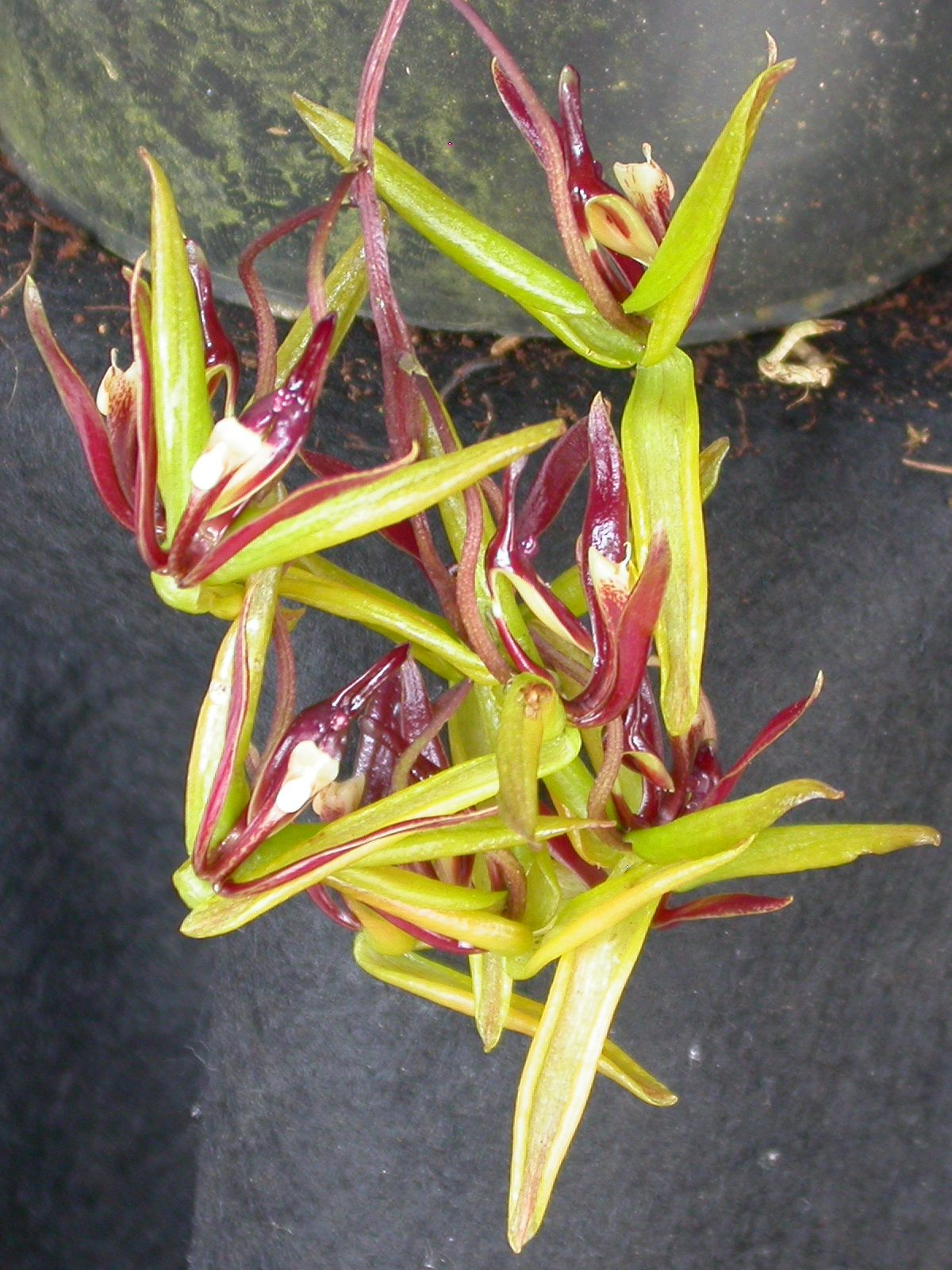
- Cirrhaea dependens

Scientific classification
- Kingdom: Plantae
- Clade: Tracheophytes
- Clade: Angiosperms
- Clade: Monocots
- Order: Asparagales
- Family: Orchidaceae
- Subfamily: Epidendroideae
- Tribe: Cymbidieae
- Subtribe: Stanhopeinae
- Genus: Cirrhaea; Lindl. (1825)

Type species
- Cirrhaea dependens (Lodd.) Loudon (1830)

Synonyms
- Scleropterys Scheidw. (1839); Sarcoglossum Beer (1954)

= Cirrhaea =

Genus of orchids

Cirrhaea is a genus of orchids, comprising 7 recognized species, all endemic to Brazil.

== List of species ==
1. Cirrhaea dependens (Lodd.) Loudon (1830)
2. Cirrhaea fuscolutea Lindl. (1833)
3. Cirrhaea loddigesii Lindl. (1832)
4. Cirrhaea longiracemosa Hoehne (1933)
5. Cirrhaea nasuta Brade (1949)
6. Cirrhaea seidelii Pabst (1972)
7. Cirrhaea silvana V.P. Castro & Campacci (1990)
