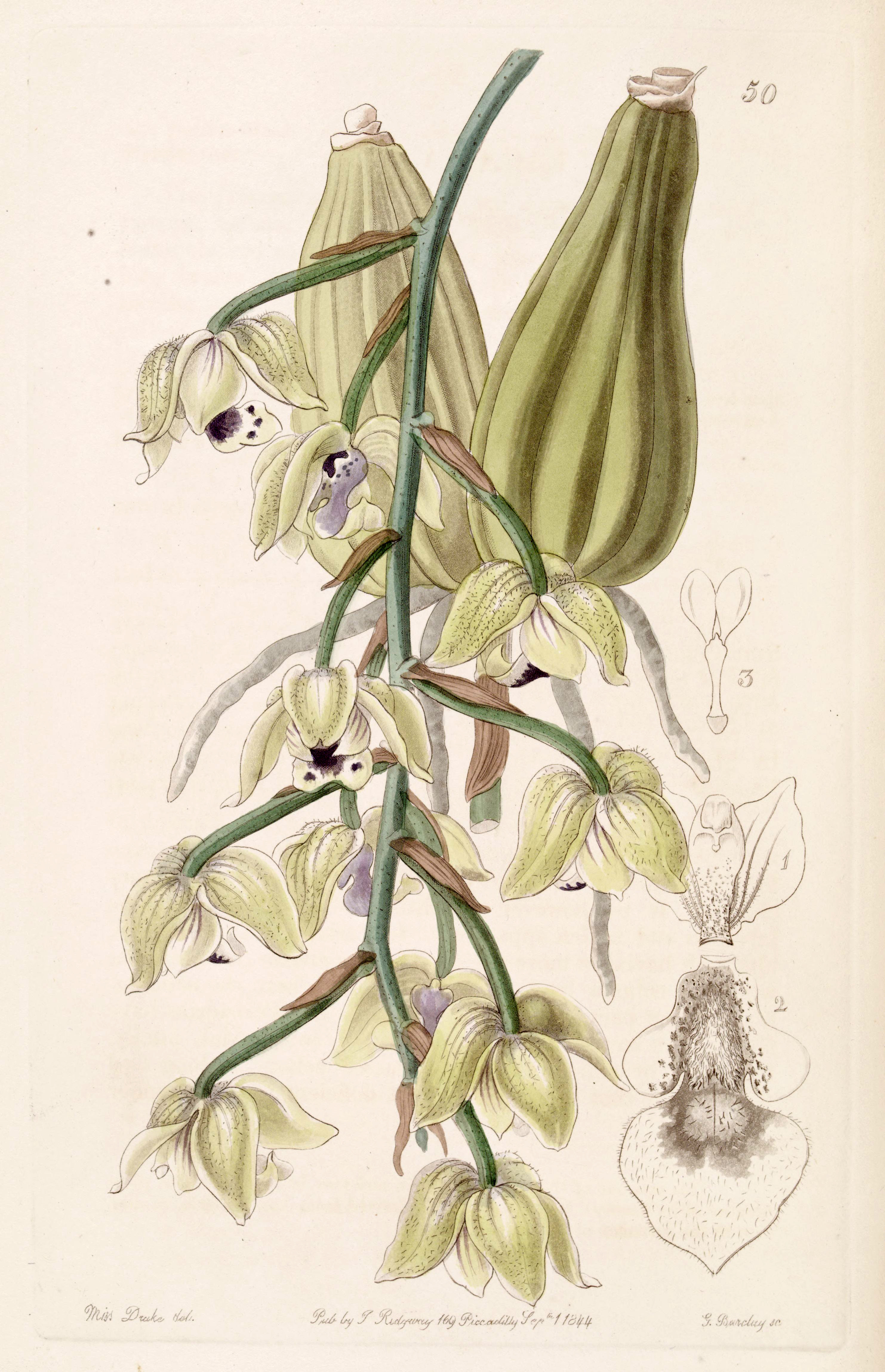
- Lacaena bicolor 1844 illustration

Scientific classification
- Kingdom: Plantae
- Clade: Tracheophytes
- Clade: Angiosperms
- Clade: Monocots
- Order: Asparagales
- Family: Orchidaceae
- Subfamily: Epidendroideae
- Tribe: Cymbidieae
- Subtribe: Stanhopeinae
- Genus: Lacaena; Lindl.

Synonyms
- Nauenia Klotzsch

= Lacaena =

Genus of orchids

Lacaena is a genus of orchids native to Central America, Colombia and southern Mexico.

== Species ==
As of May 2023, Plants of the World Online accepts the following species:

Image	Scientific name	Distribution	Elevation (m)
	Lacaena bicolor Lindl.	Mexico, Belize, Guatemala, El Salvador, Honduras, Nicaragua, Colombia and southern Mexico	1,100–2,400 metres (3,600–7,900 ft)
	Lacaena spectabilis (Klotzsch) Rchb.f.	from Mexico (Chiapas), El Salvador, Nicaragua, Honduras, Costa Rica and Panama	1,200–1,650 metres (3,940–5,410 ft)
