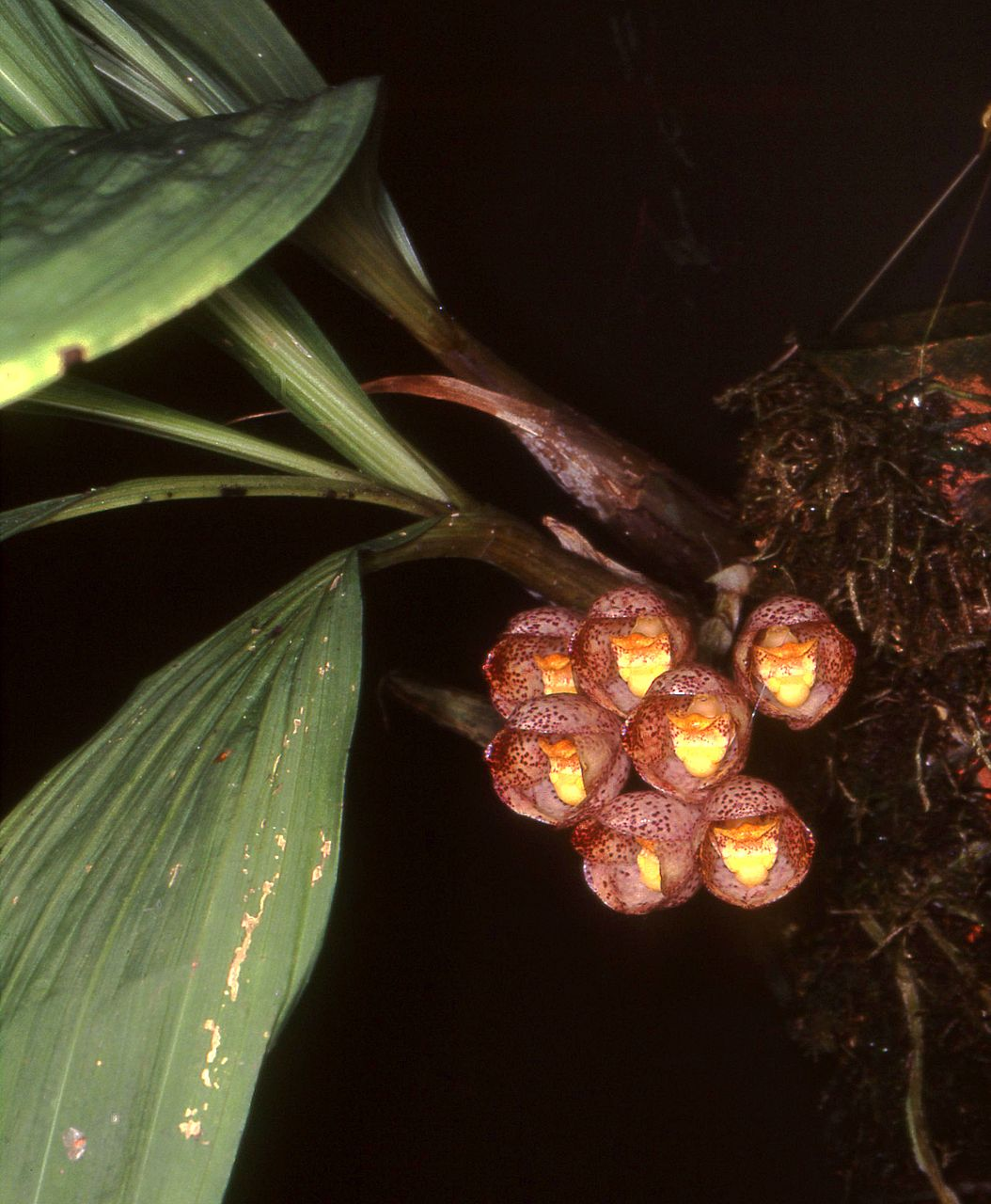
- Flower of Peristeria pendula

Scientific classification
- Kingdom: Plantae
- Clade: Tracheophytes
- Clade: Angiosperms
- Clade: Monocots
- Order: Asparagales
- Family: Orchidaceae
- Subfamily: Epidendroideae
- Genus: Peristeria
- Species: P. pendula

Binomial name
- Peristeria pendula Hook.

Synonyms
- Peristeria lentiginosa Lodd. ex W.Baxter; Peristeria maculata Loudon

= Peristeria pendula =

Species of orchid

Peristeria pendula is a species of orchid occurring from Trinidad to Central America and tropical South America.
