= Horichia =

Conservation status
- CITES Appendix II

Scientific classification
- Kingdom: Plantae
- Clade: Tracheophytes
- Clade: Angiosperms
- Clade: Monocots
- Order: Asparagales
- Family: Orchidaceae
- Subfamily: Epidendroideae
- Tribe: Cymbidieae
- Subtribe: Stanhopeinae
- Genus: Horichia; Jenny
- Species: H. dressleri

Binomial name
- Horichia dressleri Jenny

Genus of orchids

Horichia is a monotypic genus of orchid in the subtribe Stanhopeinae. Its only species is Horichia dressleri, which is endemic to Panama.
