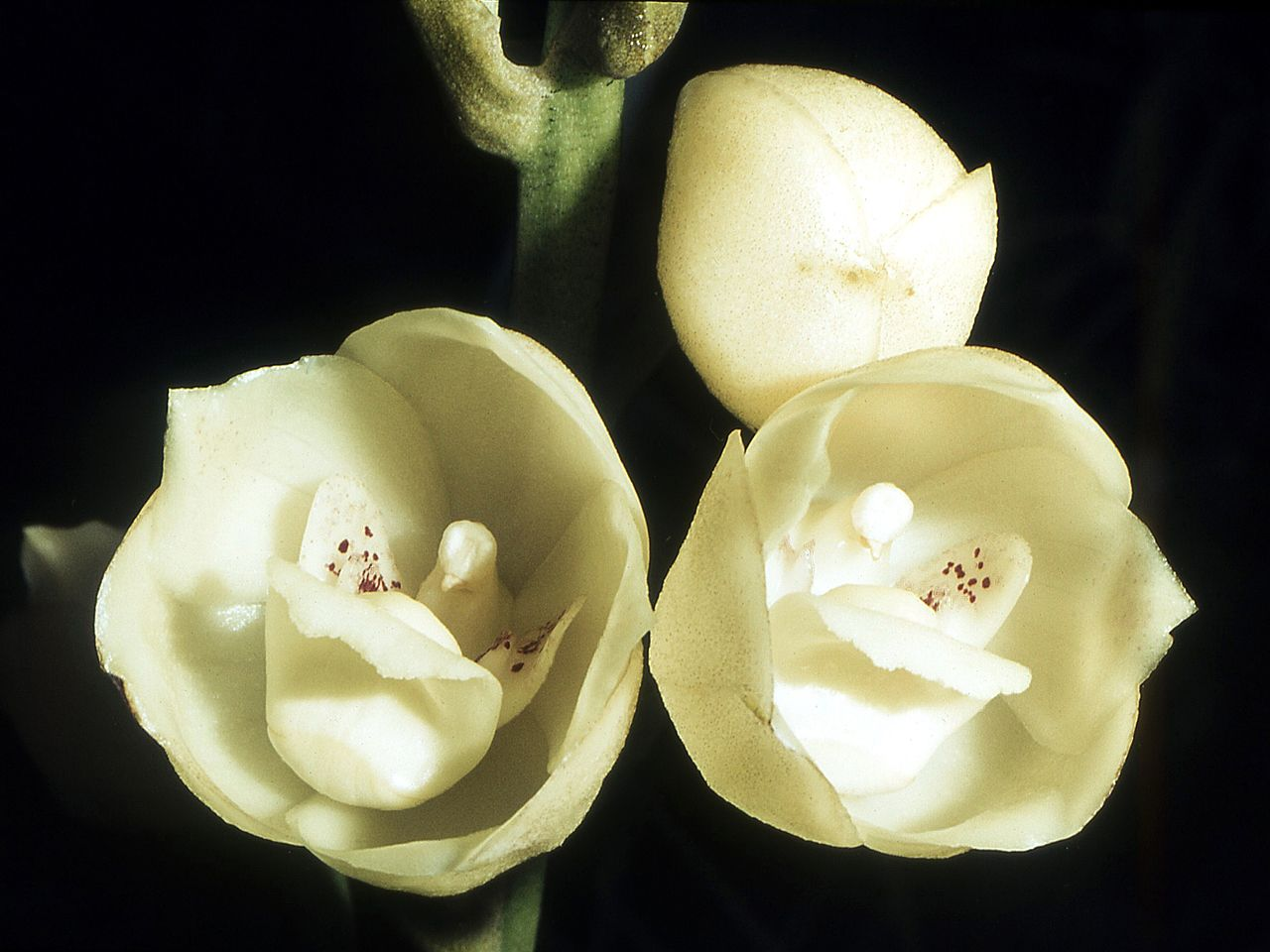
- Peristeria elata

Scientific classification
- Kingdom: Plantae
- Clade: Tracheophytes
- Clade: Angiosperms
- Clade: Monocots
- Order: Asparagales
- Family: Orchidaceae
- Subfamily: Epidendroideae
- Subtribe: Coeliopsidinae
- Genus: Peristeria; Hook.

Type species
- Peristeria elata Hook.

Species
- Peristeria cerina; Peristeria cochlearis; Peristeria elata; Peristeria ephippium; Peristeria esperanzae; Peristeria guttata; Peristeria leucoxantha; Peristeria lindenii; Peristeria pendula; Peristeria rossiana; Peristeria selligera; Peristeria serroniana; Peristeria violacea

Synonyms
- Eckartia Rchb. f.

= Peristeria (plant) =

Genus of orchids

Peristeria is a genus of plants of the family Orchidaceae commonly called dove orchid or Holy Ghost orchid. In line with the common name, the genus' name is from the Greek word peristerion meaning "from dove". According to the Royal Horticultural Society, Per is the official orchid abbreviation for this genus. In nature, it is found across much of South America as well as in Panama, Costa Rica and Trinidad.

Peristeria elata is the national flower of Panama and is extremely over-collected in its native habitat. This over collection has led to its status as a species threatened with extinction delineated in Appendix I of CITES. In its native habitat, Peristeria can usually be found growing near the edge of hardwood forests. In the fall, after the trees in the hardwood forest lose their leaves, the plants are exposed to full sun throughout the cool, dry winter. Species in this genus are either epiphytic or terrestrial in growth habit.

== Species ==
Image	Scientific name	Distribution	Elevation (m)
	Peristeria aspersa Rolfe 1890	Brazil (Amazonas), Venezuela, French Guiana	
	Peristeria cerina Lindl. 1837	Panama to Trinidad and Brazil (Pará)	200–1,000 metres (660–3,280 ft)
	Peristeria cochlearis Garay 1972	Colombia	0 metres (0 ft)
	Peristeria elata Hook. 1831	Colombia, Costa Rica, Ecuador, Panamá, Venezuela	100–700 metres (330–2,300 ft)
	Peristeria ephippium Rchb.f. 1883	Colombia to Venezuela (Amazonas)	
	Peristeria esperanzae P.Ortiz 2008	Colombia.	200 metres (660 ft)
	Peristeria guttata Knowles & Westc. 1838	Bolivia, Brazil North, Colombia, French Guiana, Guyana, Peru, Suriname, Venezuela	400 metres (1,300 ft)
	Peristeria leucoxantha Garay 1954	Colombia (Cauca), Ecuador	
	Peristeria lindenii Rolfe 1891	Ecuador to Peru	800–1,000 metres (2,600–3,300 ft)
	Peristeria oscarii-rodrigoi Archila, Szlach. & Kolan. 2015	Guatemala.	
	Peristeria pendula Hook. 1836	Brazil (Amazonas, Pará), Colombia, Ecuador, French Guiana, Guyana, Panamá, Peru, Suriname, Trinidad-Tobago, Venezuela	500–1,500 metres (1,600–4,900 ft)
	Peristeria selligera Rchb.f. 1887	Guyana	
	Peristeria serroniana (Barb.Rodr.) Garay 1954	Brazil (Pará)	
