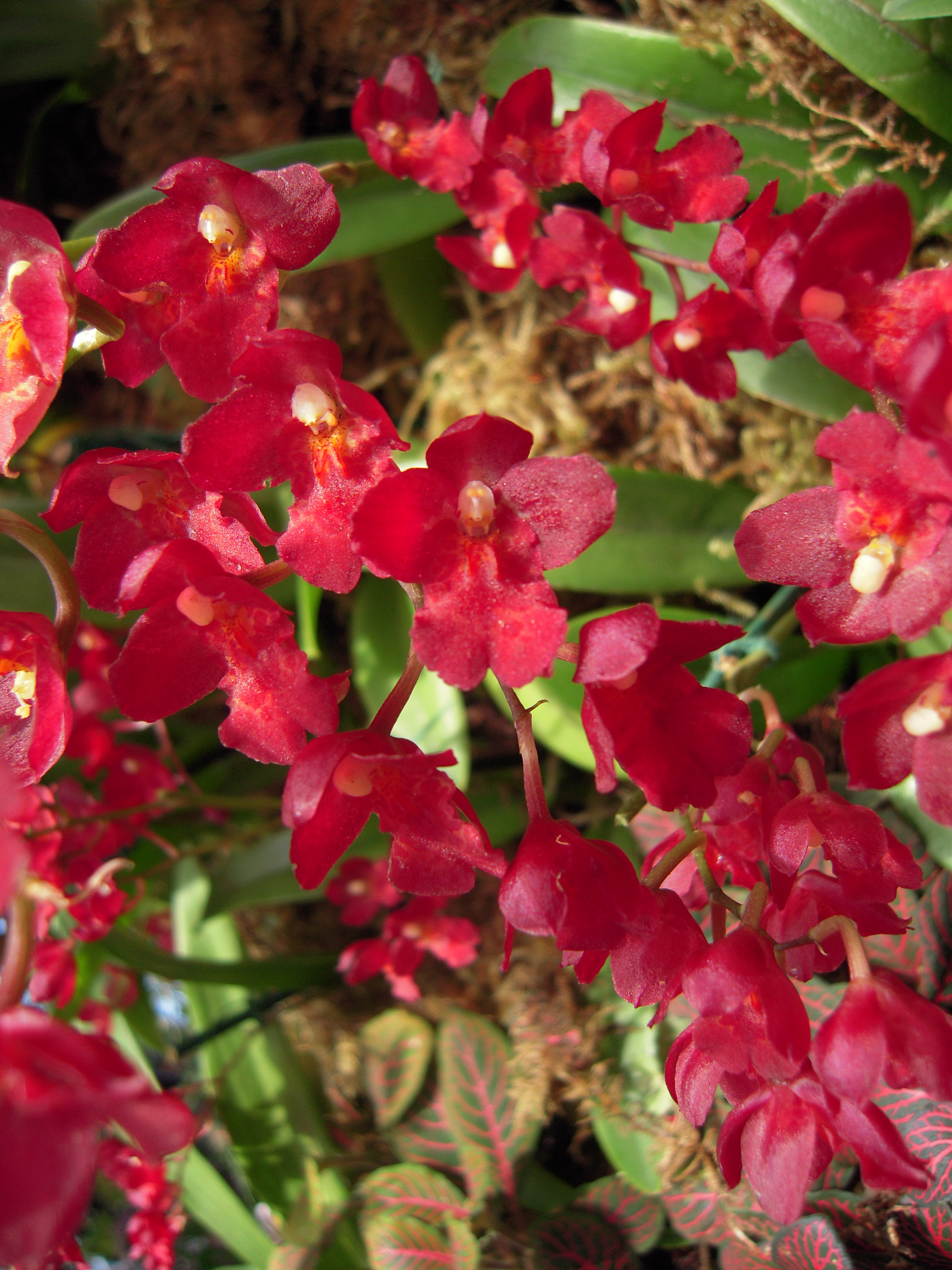
- Howeara 'Lavaburst'

Scientific classification
- Kingdom: Plantae
- Clade: Tracheophytes
- Clade: Angiosperms
- Clade: Monocots
- Order: Asparagales
- Family: Orchidaceae
- Subfamily: Epidendroideae
- Tribe: Cymbidieae
- Subtribe: Oncidiinae
- Genus: × Howeara hort.

= × Howeara =

Genus of flowering plants

× Howeara, abbreviated as Hwra. in the horticultural trade, is the nothogenus for intergeneric hybrid of the three genera Leochilus, Oncidium and Rodriguezia (Lchs. × Onc. × Rdza.).

The most known hybrids are:

- Hwra. Mini-Primi = × Rodricidium Primi × Leochilus oncidioidesHoweara named for Stephen Howe of Miami, orchid hybrid Howeara Mini Primi.
- Hwra. Lava Burst = Hwra. Mini-Primi × Rodriguezia secunda
- Hwra. Leila Groll = Hwra. Mini-Primi × Oncidium sotoanum
- Zka. Mary Eliza = Hwra. Mini-Primi × Zelenkoa onusta
