= Schunkea =

Scientific classification
- Kingdom: Plantae
- Clade: Tracheophytes
- Clade: Angiosperms
- Clade: Monocots
- Order: Asparagales
- Family: Orchidaceae
- Subfamily: Epidendroideae
- Tribe: Cymbidieae
- Subtribe: Oncidiinae
- Genus: Schunkea; Senghas
- Species: S. vierlingii

Binomial name
- Schunkea vierlingii Senghas

Species of orchid

Schunkea is a monotypic genus of flowering plants belonging to the family Orchidaceae. The only known species is Schunkea vierlingii.

It is native to south-eastern Brazil.

The genus name of Schunkea is in honour of Vital Schunk (fl. 1990–1999), co-collector of this plant in southeast Brazil. The Latin specific epithet of vierlingii refers to botanist and plant collector, Gerhard Vierling (fl. 2016), who later published Seegeriella senghasiana Vierling in OrchideenJ. Vol.23 (Issue 2) on page 80 in 2016. In honour of Seghas. Both the genus and the species were first described and published in Palmengarten Vol.58 on page 128 in 1994.
