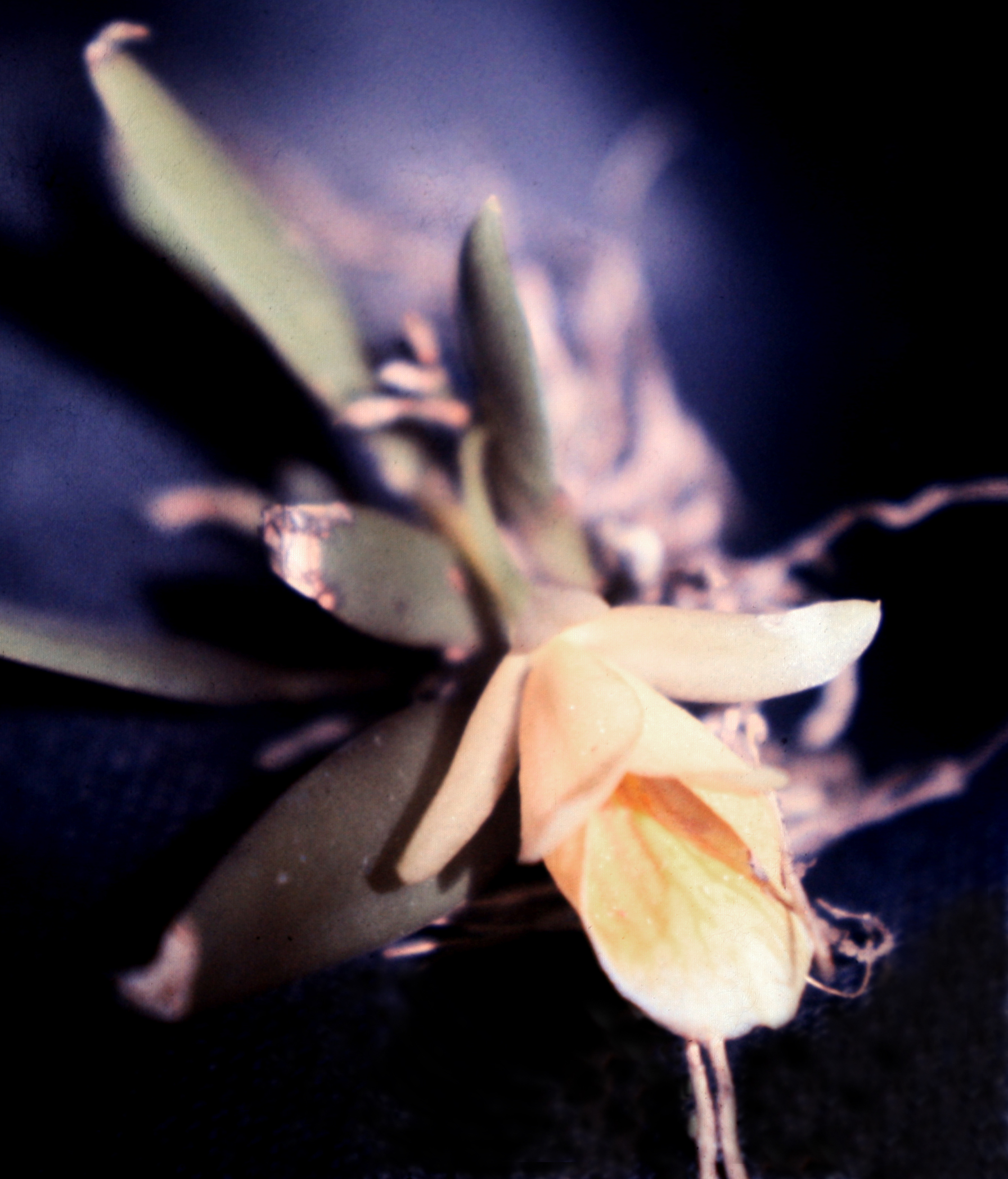
- Plectophora iridifolia
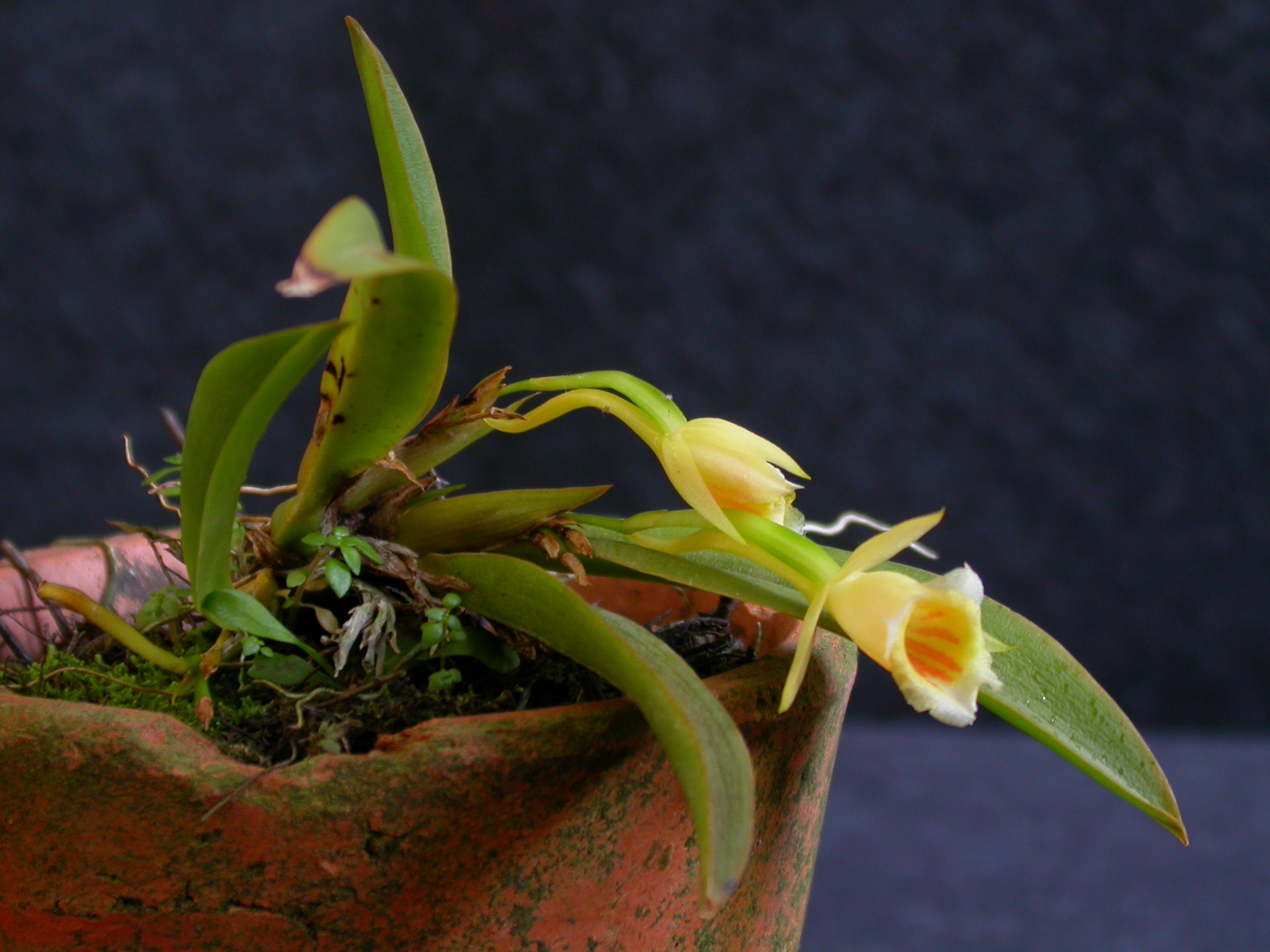
- Plectrophora cultrifolia

Scientific classification
- Kingdom: Plantae
- Clade: Tracheophytes
- Clade: Angiosperms
- Clade: Monocots
- Order: Asparagales
- Family: Orchidaceae
- Subfamily: Epidendroideae
- Tribe: Cymbidieae
- Subtribe: Oncidiinae
- Genus: Plectrophora; H.Focke

Type species
- Plectrophora iridifolia (Lodd. ex Lindl.) H.Focke

Synonyms
- Jansenia Barb.Rodr.

= Plectrophora =

Genus of orchids

Plectrophora is a genus of flowering plants from the orchid family, Orchidaceae. It is native to Central and South America.

Species accepted as of June 2014:

1. Plectrophora alata (Rolfe) Garay - Chiapas, Guatemala, Costa Rica, Panama, Colombia
2. Plectrophora calcarhamata Hoehne - Matto Grosso
3. Plectrophora cultrifolia (Barb.Rodr.) Cogn. in C.F.P.von Martius - French Guinea, Venezuela, Ecuador, Peru, Brazil
4. Plectrophora edwallii Cogn. in C.F.P.von Martius - Goiás
5. Plectrophora iridifolia (Lodd. ex Lindl.) H.Focke - the Guianas, Venezuela, Brazil
6. Plectrophora schmidtii Jenny & Pupulin - Matto Grosso
7. Plectrophora suarezii Dodson & M.W.Chase - Ecuador
8. Plectrophora triquetra (Rolfe) Cogn. in C.F.P.von Martius - Ecuador, Peru
9. Plectrophora tucanderana Dodson & R.Vásquez - Bolivia
10. Plectrophora zarumensis Dodson & P.M.Dodson - Ecuador

== See also ==
- List of Orchidaceae genera
