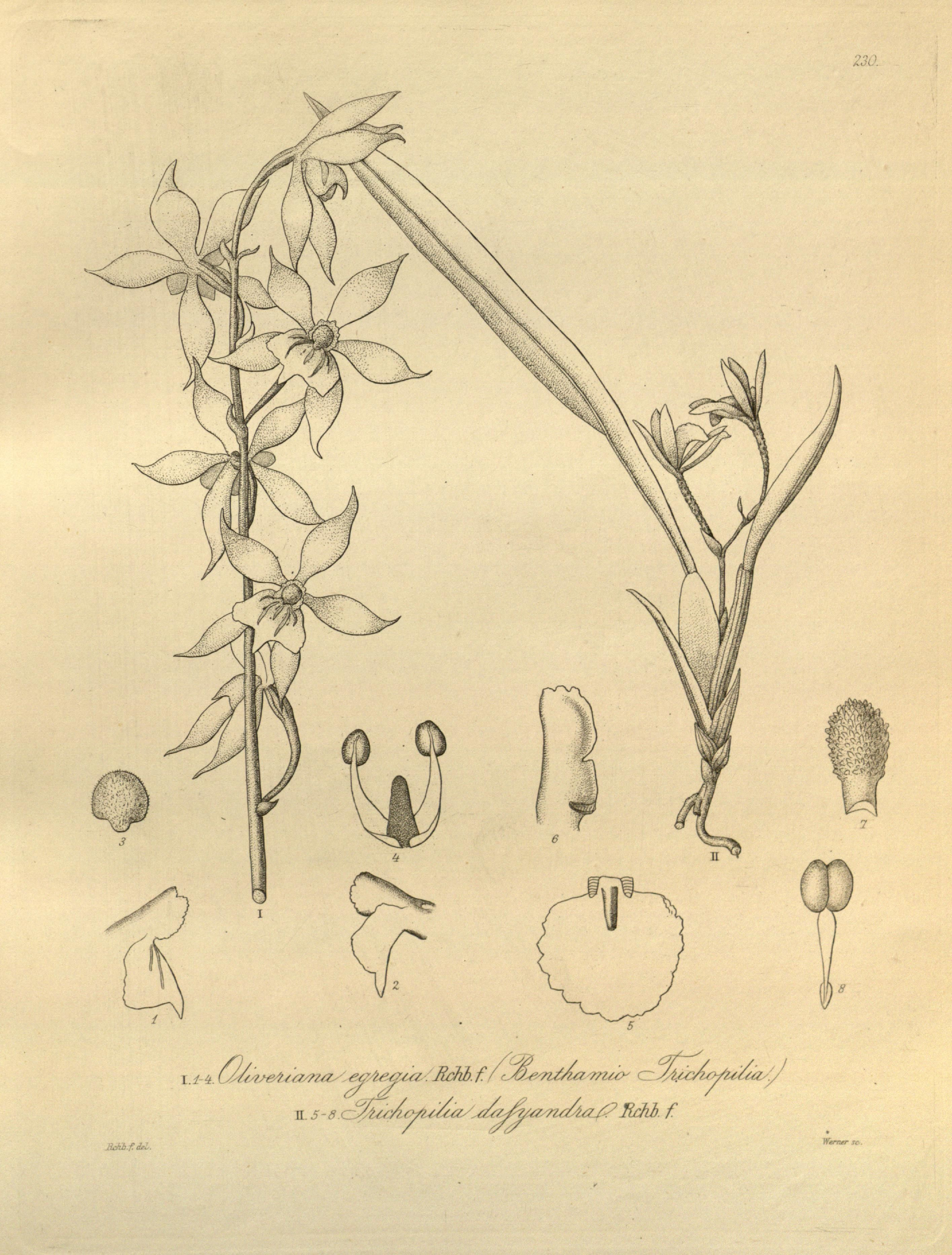
- Oliveriana egregia - Cischweinfia dasyandra (as Trichopilia dasyandra)- Xenia 3 pl 230

Scientific classification
- Kingdom: Plantae
- Clade: Tracheophytes
- Clade: Angiosperms
- Clade: Monocots
- Order: Asparagales
- Family: Orchidaceae
- Subfamily: Epidendroideae
- Tribe: Cymbidieae
- Subtribe: Oncidiinae
- Genus: Oliveriana; Rchb.f.

= Oliveriana =

Genus of orchids

Oliveriana is a genus of flowering plants from the orchid family, Orchidaceae. It contains 6 known species, all native to South America.

- Oliveriana brevilabia (C.Schweinf.) Dressler & N.H.Williams - Peru, Ecuador
- Oliveriana ecuadorensis Dodson - Ecuador, Venezuela
- Oliveriana egregia Rchb.f. - Colombia, Guyana
- Oliveriana lehmannii Garay - Colombia
- Oliveriana ortizii A.Fernández - Colombia
- Oliveriana simulans Dodson & R.Vásquez - Bolivia

== See also ==
- List of Orchidaceae genera
