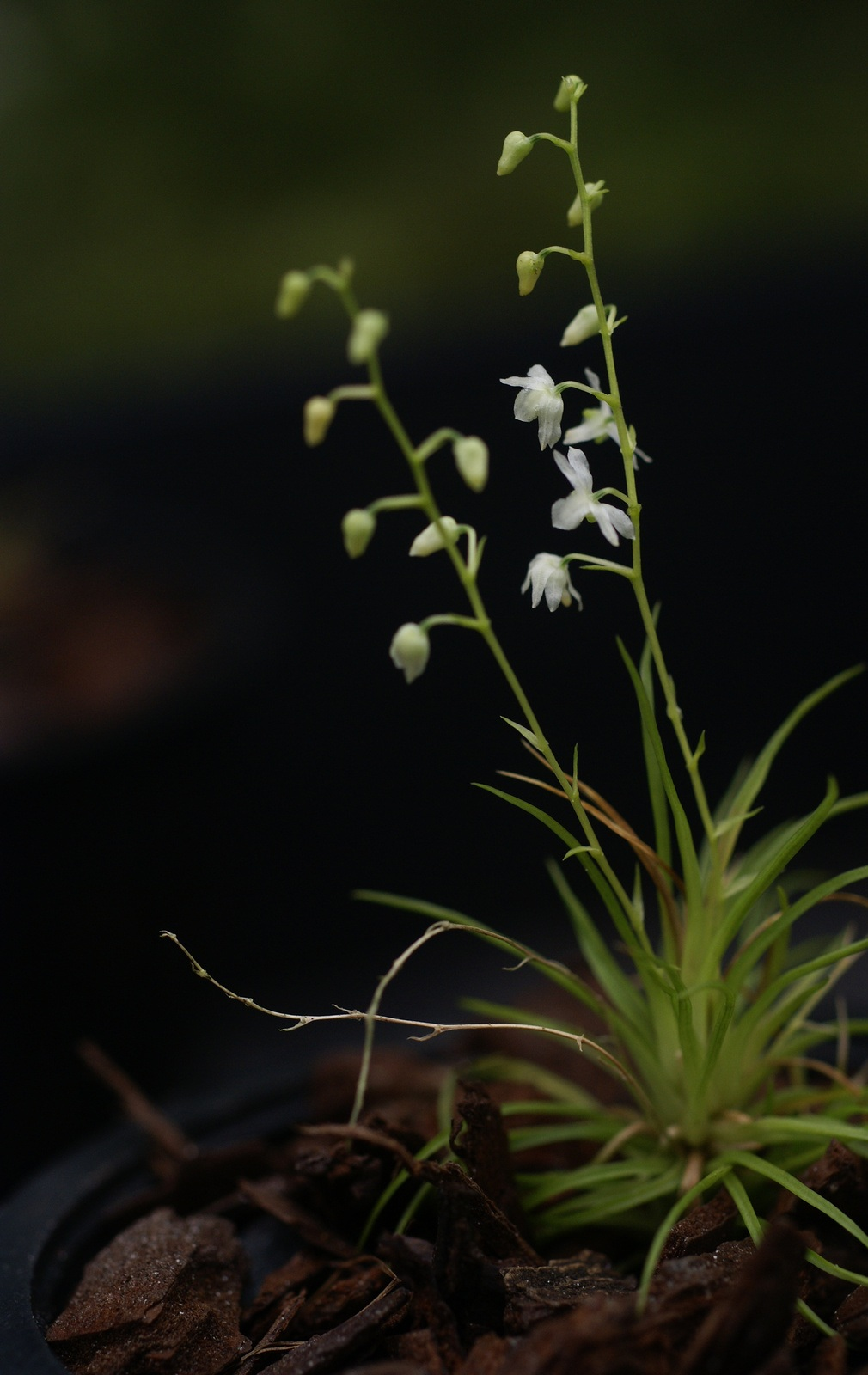
- Phymatidium delicatulum in flower

Scientific classification
- Kingdom: Plantae
- Clade: Tracheophytes
- Clade: Angiosperms
- Clade: Monocots
- Order: Asparagales
- Family: Orchidaceae
- Subfamily: Epidendroideae
- Tribe: Cymbidieae
- Subtribe: Oncidiinae
- Genus: Phymatidium; Lindl.

Synonyms
- Phymatidiopsis Szlach.

= Phymatidium =

Genus of orchids

Phymatidium is a genus of flowering plants from the orchid family, Orchidaceae. It is native to Brazil, Argentina and Paraguay.

1. Phymatidium aquinoi Schltr. - Brazil
2. Phymatidium delicatulum Lindl. - Brazil, Argentina, Paraguay
3. Phymatidium falcifolium Lindl. - Brazil
4. Phymatidium geiselii Ruschi - Espírito Santo
5. Phymatidium glaziovii Toscano - Rio de Janeiro
6. Phymatidium hysteranthum Barb.Rodr. - Brazil
7. Phymatidium limae Porto & Brade - Rio de Janeiro
8. Phymatidium mellobarretoi L.O.Williams & Hoehne - Brazil
9. Phymatidium microphyllum (Barb.Rodr.) Toscano - Brazil
10. Phymatidium vogelii Pabst - São Paulo

== See also ==
- List of Orchidaceae genera
