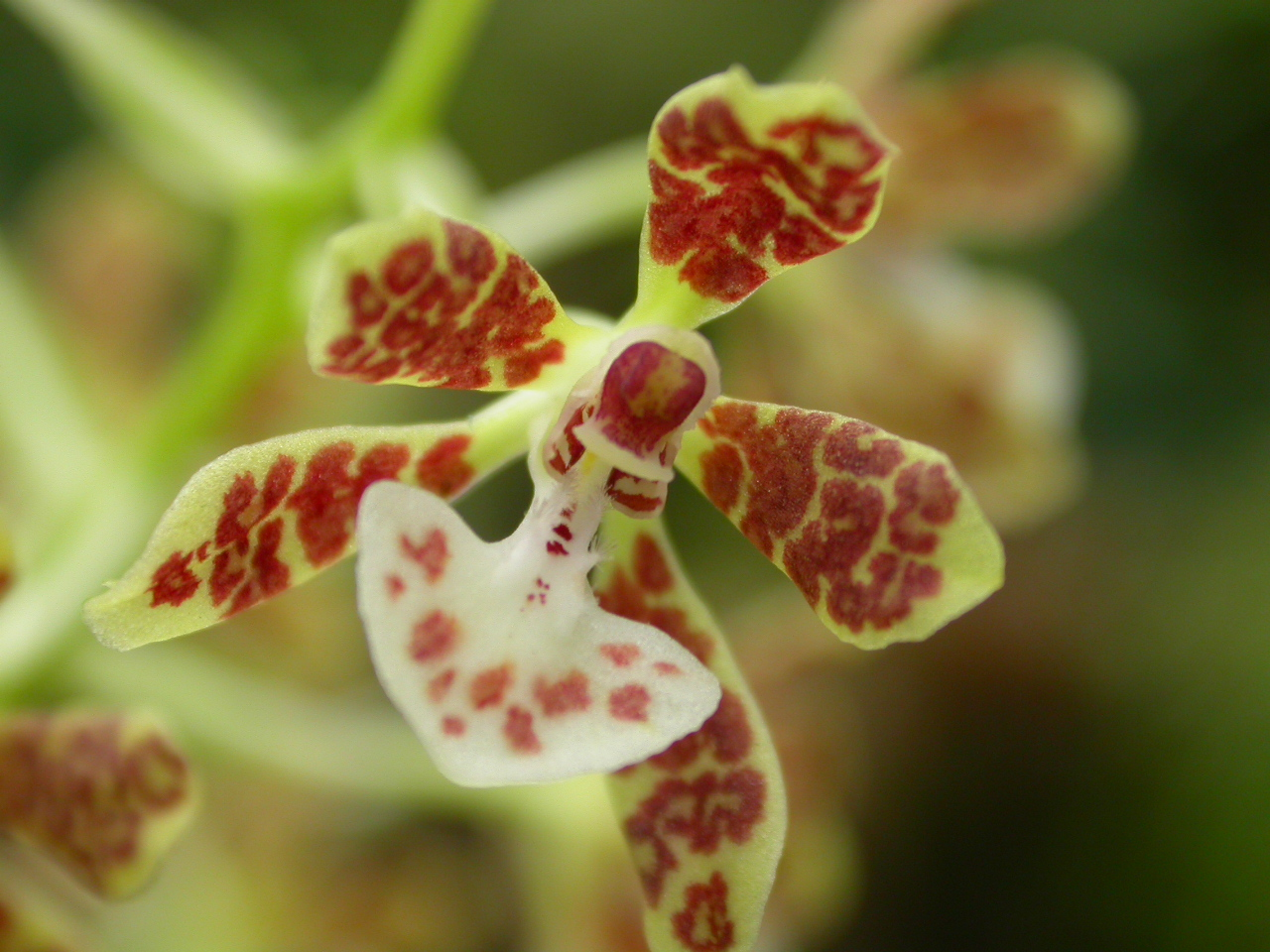
- Solenidium lunatum

Scientific classification
- Kingdom: Plantae
- Clade: Tracheophytes
- Clade: Angiosperms
- Clade: Monocots
- Order: Asparagales
- Family: Orchidaceae
- Subfamily: Epidendroideae
- Tribe: Cymbidieae
- Subtribe: Oncidiinae
- Genus: Solenidium; Lindl.

Type species
- Solenidium racemosum

= Solenidium =

Genus of orchids

Solenidium is a genus of flowering plants from the orchid family, Orchidaceae. It has three known species, all native to South America.

== List of species ==
As of November 2024, Plants of the World Online accepted the following species:

Image	Scientific name	Distribution	Elevation (m)
	Solenidium lunatum (Lindl.) Schltr.	Brazil, Guyana, Venezuela, Ecuador, Peru	200–700 metres (660–2,300 ft)
	Solenidium portillae Dalström & Whitten	Ecuador	800–1,500 metres (2,600–4,900 ft)
	Solenidium racemosum Lindl.	Brazil, Colombia, Venezuela	500–900 metres (1,600–3,000 ft)

== See also ==
- List of Orchidaceae genera
