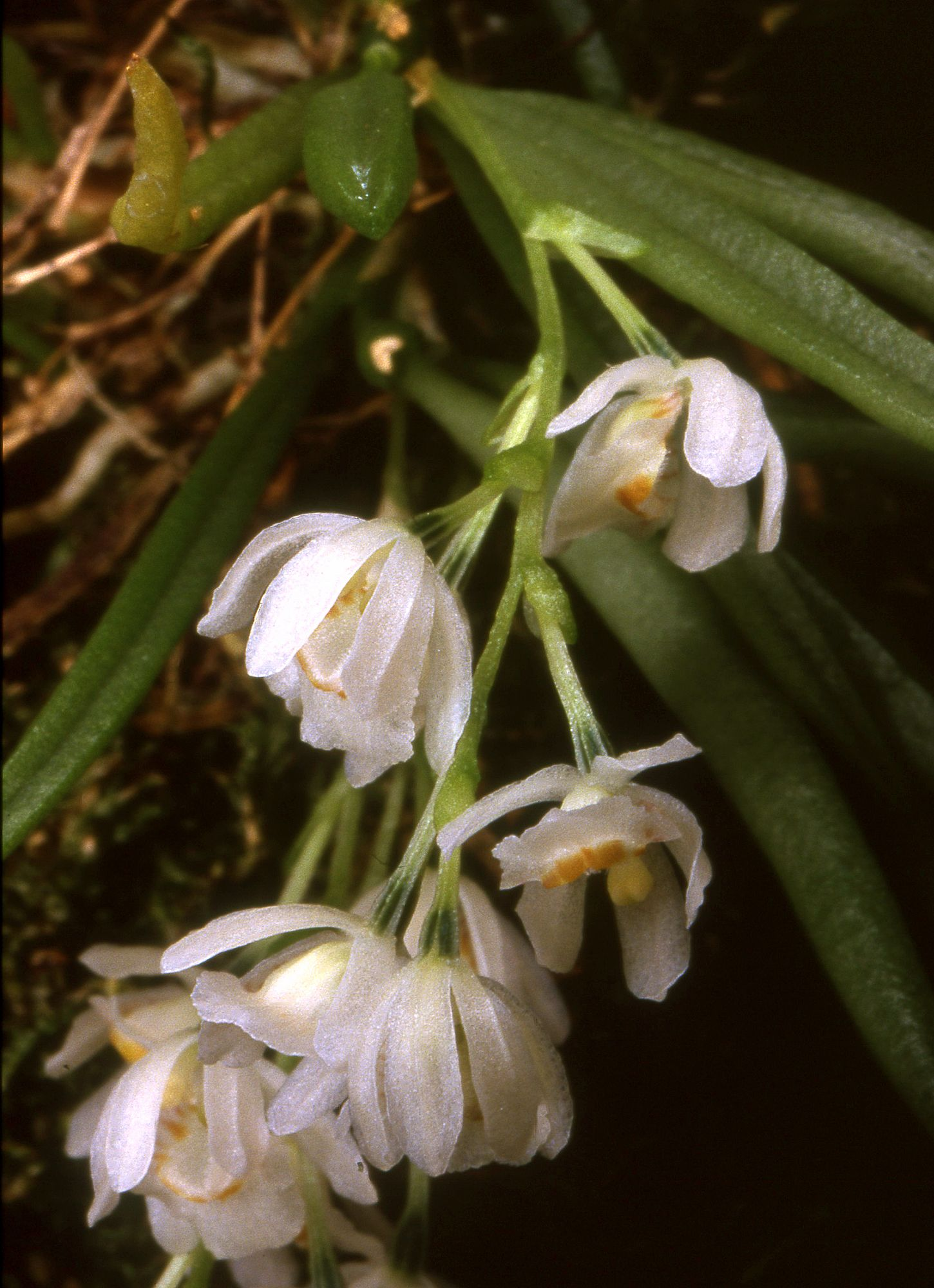

Scientific classification
- Kingdom: Plantae
- Clade: Tracheophytes
- Clade: Angiosperms
- Clade: Monocots
- Order: Asparagales
- Family: Orchidaceae
- Subfamily: Epidendroideae
- Tribe: Cymbidieae
- Subtribe: Oncidiinae
- Genus: Hintonella; Ames
- Species: H. mexicana

Binomial name
- Hintonella mexicana Ames

= Hintonella =

Genus of orchids

Hintonella is a genus of flowering plants from the orchid family, Orchidaceae. It contains only one known species, Hintonella mexicana, native to central and southern Mexico (Jalisco, Guerrero, Mexico State, Morelos, Michoacán, Oaxaca).

== See also ==
- List of Orchidaceae genera
