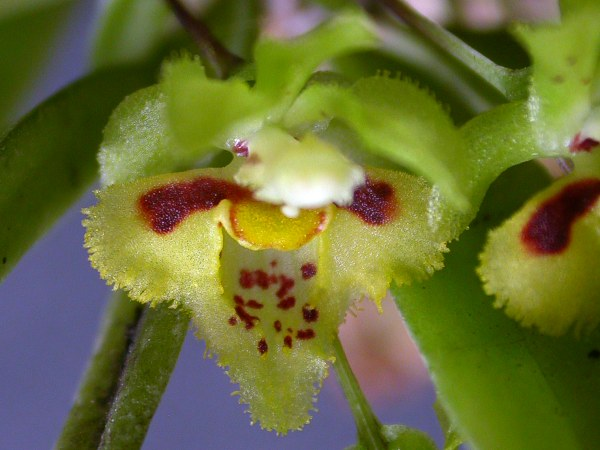
- Chytroglossa marileoniae

Scientific classification
- Kingdom: Plantae
- Clade: Tracheophytes
- Clade: Angiosperms
- Clade: Monocots
- Order: Asparagales
- Family: Orchidaceae
- Subfamily: Epidendroideae
- Tribe: Cymbidieae
- Subtribe: Oncidiinae
- Genus: Chytroglossa; Rchb.f. (1863)

Type species
- Chytroglossa marileoniae Rchb.f. (1863)

= Chytroglossa =

Genus of orchids

Chytroglossa is a genus of flowering plants from the orchid family, Orchidaceae. It contains three recognized species, all endemic to southeastern Brazil.

== Species ==
- Chytroglossa aurata Rchb.f. (1863)
- Chytroglossa marileoniae Rchb.f. (1863)
- Chytroglossa paulensis Edwall (1903)

== See also ==
- List of Orchidaceae genera
