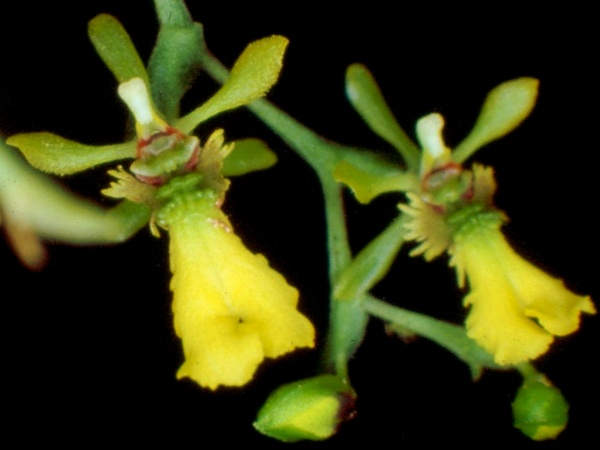
- Thysanoglossa organensis

Scientific classification
- Kingdom: Plantae
- Clade: Tracheophytes
- Clade: Angiosperms
- Clade: Monocots
- Order: Asparagales
- Family: Orchidaceae
- Subfamily: Epidendroideae
- Tribe: Cymbidieae
- Subtribe: Oncidiinae
- Genus: Thysanoglossa; Porto & Brade

= Thysanoglossa =

Genus of orchids

Thysanoglossa is a genus of flowering plants from the orchid family, Orchidaceae. It contains three known species, all endemic to southeastern Brazil.

- Thysanoglossa jordanensis Porto & Brade - São Paulo
- Thysanoglossa organensis Brade - Rio de Janeiro
- Thysanoglossa spiritu-sanctensis N.Sanson & Chiron - Espírito Santo

== See also ==
- List of Orchidaceae genera
