= Sutrina =

Scientific classification
- Kingdom: Plantae
- Clade: Tracheophytes
- Clade: Angiosperms
- Clade: Monocots
- Order: Asparagales
- Family: Orchidaceae
- Subfamily: Epidendroideae
- Tribe: Cymbidieae
- Subtribe: Oncidiinae
- Genus: Sutrina; Lindl.

Type species
- Sutrina bicolor Lindl.

Genus of orchids

Sutrina is a genus of flowering plants from the orchid family, Orchidaceae. The genus contains only two known species, both endemic to South America.

- Sutrina bicolor Lindl. - Peru
- Sutrina garayi Senghas - Bolivia

== See also ==
- List of Orchidaceae genera
