= Systeloglossum =

Scientific classification
- Kingdom: Plantae
- Clade: Tracheophytes
- Clade: Angiosperms
- Clade: Monocots
- Order: Asparagales
- Family: Orchidaceae
- Subfamily: Epidendroideae
- Tribe: Cymbidieae
- Subtribe: Oncidiinae
- Genus: Systeloglossum; Schltr.

Synonyms
- Diadeniopsis Szlach.

Genus of orchids

Systeloglossum is a genus of flowering plants from the orchid family, Orchidaceae. It contains 5 known species, all native to southeastern Central America and northwestern South America.

1. Systeloglossum acuminatum Ames & C.Schweinf. - Costa Rica, Panama
2. Systeloglossum bennettii (Garay) Dressler & N.H.Williams - Peru
3. Systeloglossum costaricense Schltr. - Peru
4. Systeloglossum ecuadorense (Garay) Dressler & N.H.Williams - Ecuador
5. Systeloglossum panamense Dressler & N.H.Williams - Panama

== See also ==
- List of Orchidaceae genera
