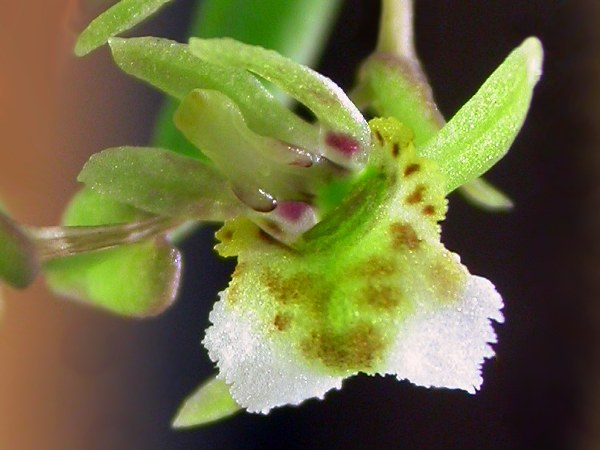
- Rauhiella brasiliensis

Scientific classification
- Kingdom: Plantae
- Clade: Tracheophytes
- Clade: Angiosperms
- Clade: Monocots
- Order: Asparagales
- Family: Orchidaceae
- Subfamily: Epidendroideae
- Tribe: Cymbidieae
- Subtribe: Oncidiinae
- Genus: Rauhiella; Pabst & Braga

= Rauhiella =

Genus of orchids

Rauhiella is a genus of flowering plants from the orchid family, Orchidaceae.

It contains three known species, all endemic to Brazil.

- Rauhiella brasiliensis Pabst & Braga - Rio de Janeiro
- Rauhiella seehaweri (I.Bock) Toscano & Christenson - Rio de Janeiro
- Rauhiella silvana Toscano - Rio de Janeiro, Bahia

== See also ==
- List of Orchidaceae genera
