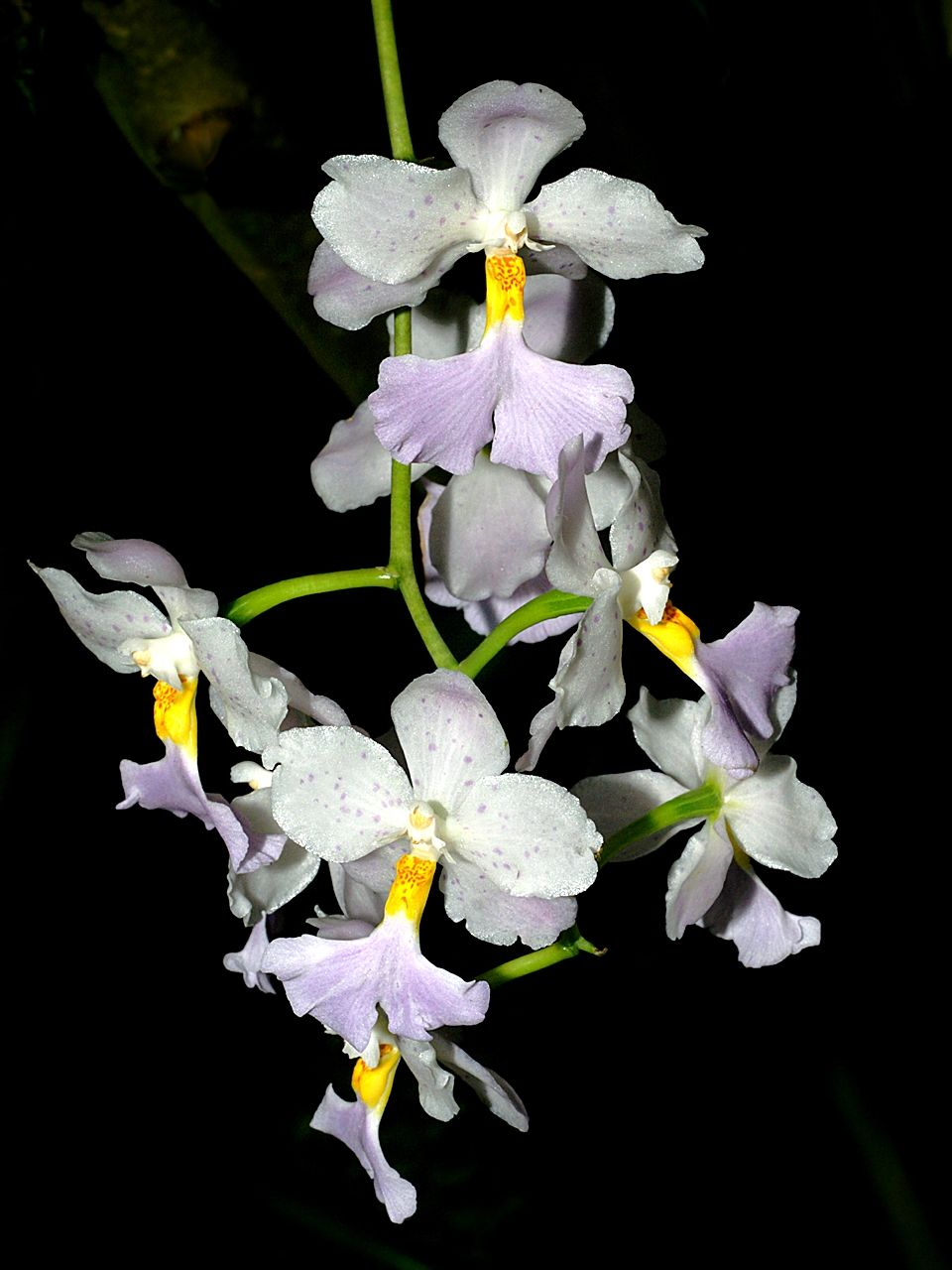
- Cuitlauzina pendula

Scientific classification
- Kingdom: Plantae
- Clade: Tracheophytes
- Clade: Angiosperms
- Clade: Monocots
- Order: Asparagales
- Family: Orchidaceae
- Subfamily: Epidendroideae
- Tribe: Cymbidieae
- Subtribe: Oncidiinae
- Genus: Cuitlauzina; Lex. in P.de La Llave & J.M.de Lexarza

Type species
- Cuitlauzina pendula

Synonyms
- Dignathe Lindl.; Lichterveldia Lem.; Palumbina Rchb.f. in W.G.Walpers; Osmoglossum Schltr.

= Cuitlauzina =

Genus of orchids

Cuitlauzina is a genus of flowering plants from the orchid family, Orchidaceae. It contains 8 recognized species, native to Mexico, Central America and Colombia.

== Species ==
Image	Name	Distribution	Elevation (m)
	Cuitlauzina candida (Lindl.) Dressler & N.H.Williams	Mexico (Chiapas), Guatemala	1,600–2,100 metres (5,200–6,900 ft)
	Cuitlauzina convallarioides (Schltr.) Dressler & N.H.Williams	Mexico (Chiapas), Guatemala, Costa Rica	1,475–2,700 metres (4,839–8,858 ft)
	Cuitlauzina dubia (S.Rosillo) Yañez & Soto Arenas ex Solano	Mexico (Oaxaca)	1,500–2,200 metres (4,900–7,200 ft)
	Cuitlauzina egertonii (Lindl.) Dressler & N.H.Williams	Mexico(Chiapas) to Colombia	1,500–2,500 metres (4,900–8,200 ft)
	Cuitlauzina pandurata (Garay) M.W.Chase & N.H.Williams	Ecuador	1,200–2,600 metres (3,900–8,500 ft)
	Cuitlauzina pendula Lex. in P.de La Llave & J.M.de Lexarza	Mexico	1,400–2,200 metres (4,600–7,200 ft)
	Cuitlauzina pulchella (Bateman ex Lindl.) Dressler & N.H.Williams	Mexico (Chiapas), Guatemala, El Salvador, Honduras	1,200–2,600 metres (3,900–8,500 ft)
	Cuitlauzina pygmaea (Lindl.) M.W.Chase & N.H.Williams	Mexico (Hidalgo)	2,100 metres (6,900 ft)

== See also ==
- List of Orchidaceae genera
