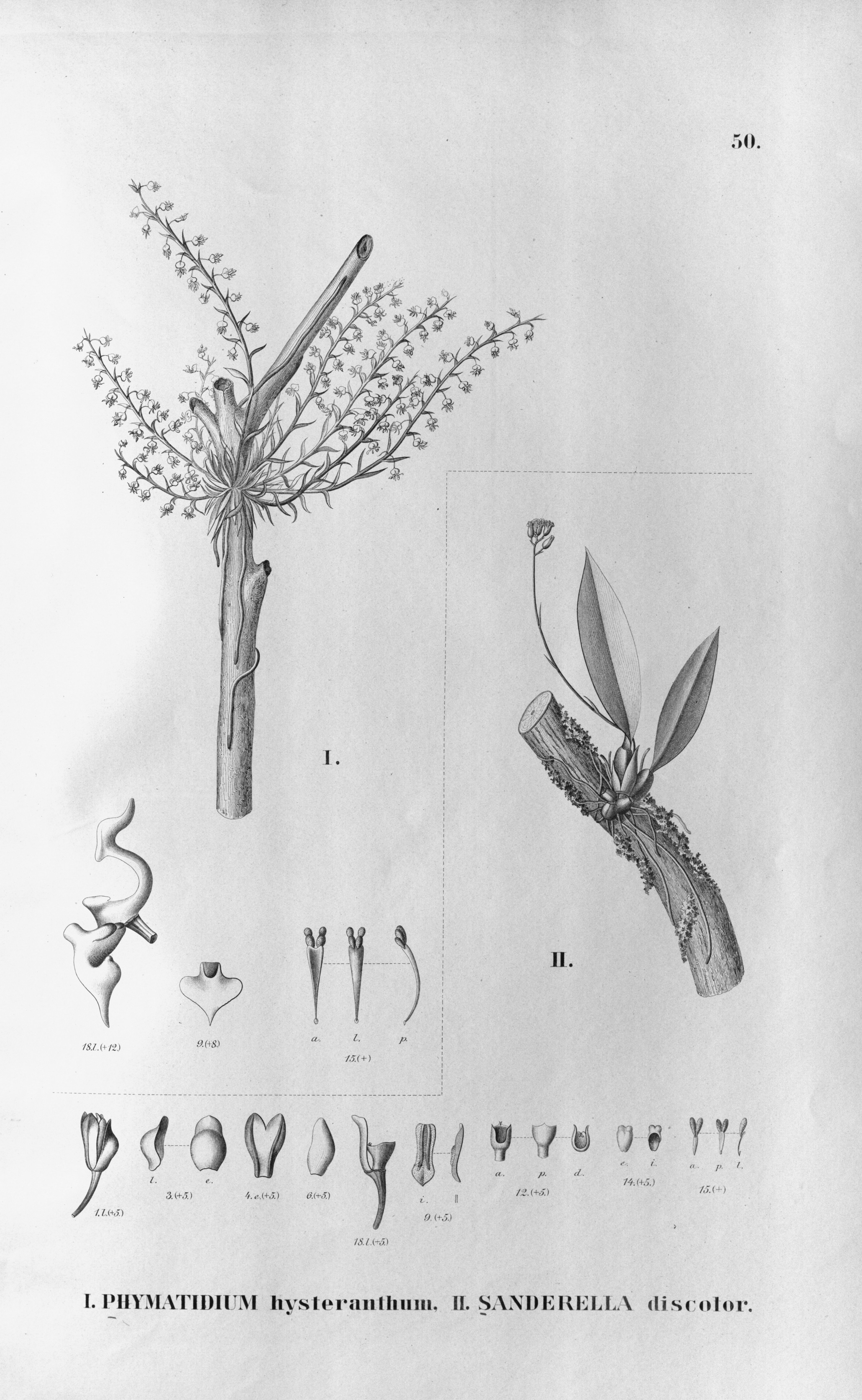
- Sanderella discolor 1905 illustration
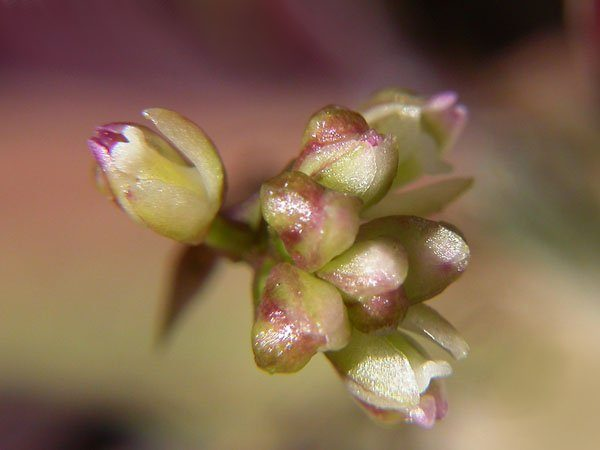

Scientific classification
- Kingdom: Plantae
- Clade: Tracheophytes
- Clade: Angiosperms
- Clade: Monocots
- Order: Asparagales
- Family: Orchidaceae
- Subfamily: Epidendroideae
- Tribe: Cymbidieae
- Subtribe: Oncidiinae
- Genus: Sanderella; Kuntze

Synonyms
- Parlatorea Barb.Rodr., illeg.

= Sanderella =

Genus of orchids

Sanderella is a genus of flowering plants from the orchid family, Orchidaceae, native to South America. Two species are recognized at present (June 2014):

- Sanderella discolor (Barb.Rodr.) Cogn. in C.F.P.von Martius & auct. suc. - Brazil, Bolivia, Argentina
- Sanderella riograndensis Dutra - Brazil, Argentina

== See also ==
- List of Orchidaceae genera
