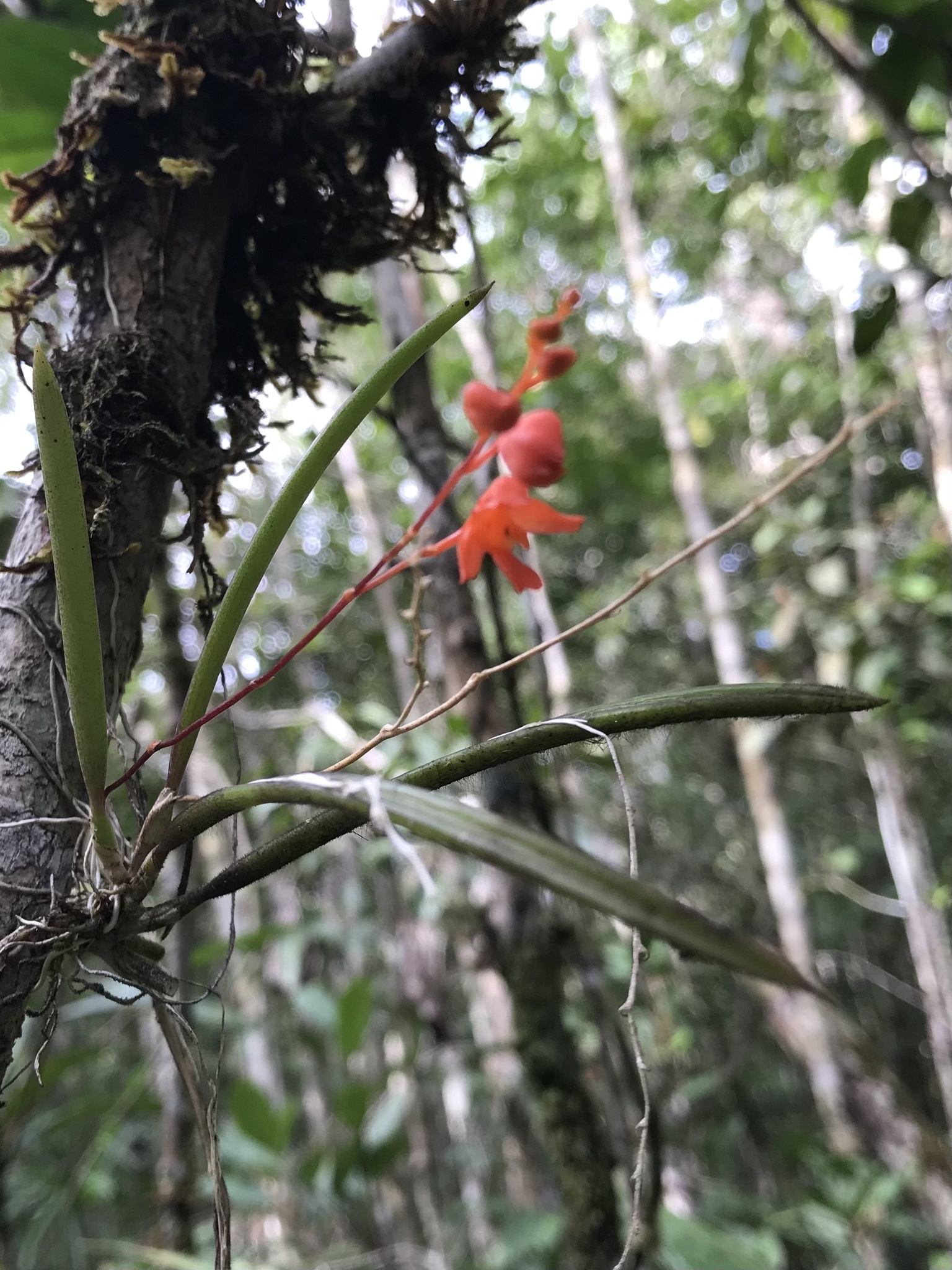
- Polyotidium huebneri in State of Amazonas, Brazil

Scientific classification
- Kingdom: Plantae
- Clade: Tracheophytes
- Clade: Angiosperms
- Clade: Monocots
- Order: Asparagales
- Family: Orchidaceae
- Subfamily: Epidendroideae
- Tribe: Cymbidieae
- Subtribe: Oncidiinae
- Genus: Polyotidium; Garay
- Species: P. huebneri

Binomial name
- Polyotidium huebneri (Mansf.) Garay

Synonyms
- Hybochilus huebneri Mansf.

= Polyotidium =

Genus of orchids

Polyotidium is a monotypic genus of flowering plants from the orchid family, Orchidaceae. The sole species is Polyotidium huebneri, native to Colombia, Venezuela and Brazil.

== See also ==
- List of Orchidaceae genera
