= Caluera =

Scientific classification
- Kingdom: Plantae
- Clade: Tracheophytes
- Clade: Angiosperms
- Clade: Monocots
- Order: Asparagales
- Family: Orchidaceae
- Subfamily: Epidendroideae
- Tribe: Cymbidieae
- Subtribe: Oncidiinae
- Genus: Caluera; Dodson & Determann

Genus of orchids

Caluera is a genus of flowering plants in the orchid family, Orchidaceae. It contains three species, all native to South America:

- Caluera surinamensis Dodson & Determann - Suriname, Venezuela, Brazil
- Caluera tavaresii Campacci & J.B.F.Silva - Brazil
- Caluera vulpina Dodson & Determann - French Guiana, Ecuador

== See also ==
- List of Orchidaceae genera
