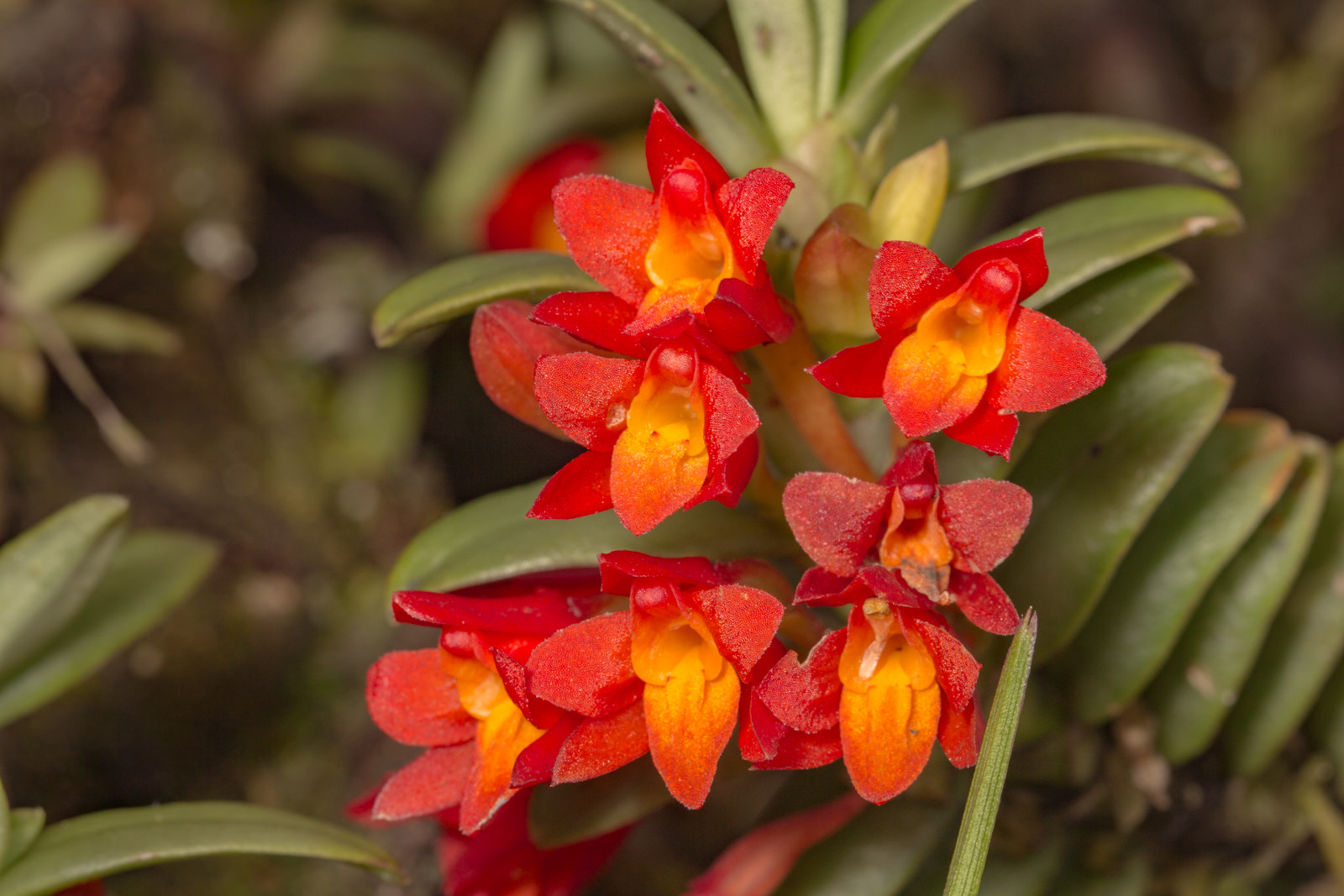
- Fernandezia sanguinea

Scientific classification
- Kingdom: Plantae
- Clade: Tracheophytes
- Clade: Angiosperms
- Clade: Monocots
- Order: Asparagales
- Family: Orchidaceae
- Subfamily: Epidendroideae
- Tribe: Cymbidieae
- Subtribe: Oncidiinae
- Genus: Fernandezia; Ruiz & Pav.

Synonyms
- Pachyphyllum Kunth in F.W.H.von Humboldt, A.J.A.Bonpland & C.S.Kunth; Centropetalum Lindl.; Nasonia Lindl. in G.Bentham; Orchidotypus Kraenzl.; Raycadenco Dodson

= Fernandezia =

Genus of orchids

Fernandezia is a genus of flowering plants from the orchid family, Orchidaceae. It contains about 30-40 species, native to northern South America, Central America, and southern Mexico.

Species include:

- Fernandezia amboroensis Ormerod
- Fernandezia angusta Ormerod
- Fernandezia antioquiensis (Szlach., Kolan. & Mystkowska) Molinari
- Fernandezia barnettiae Ormerod
- Fernandezia bilineata Ormerod
- Fernandezia breviconnata (Schltr.) M.W.Chase
- Fernandezia bryophyta (Schltr.) M.W.Chase
- Fernandezia callacallae Ormerod
- Fernandezia camposii Ormerod
- Fernandezia capitata (Kraenzl.) M.W.Chase
- Fernandezia carabayana Ormerod
- Fernandezia cardenasii (L.B.Sm. & S.K.Harris) M.W.Chase
- Fernandezia chaparensis Ormerod
- Fernandezia costaricensis (Ames & C.Schweinf.) M.W.Chase
- Fernandezia crassapex Ormerod
- Fernandezia crystallina (Lindl.) M.W.Chase
- Fernandezia cuencae (Rchb.f.) M.W.Chase
- Fernandezia cuneata Ormerod
- Fernandezia cuprea Ormerod
- Fernandezia cymbiformis Ormerod
- Fernandezia cyrtophylla (Schltr.) M.W.Chase
- Fernandezia dalstroemii (Dodson) M.W.Chase
- Fernandezia debedoutii (P.Ortiz) M.W.Chase
- Fernandezia denticulata Ruiz & Pav.
- Fernandezia diazii Ormerod
- Fernandezia distichoides M.W.Chase
- Fernandezia dorriana Ormerod
- Fernandezia ecallosa (D.E.Benn. & Christenson) M.W.Chase
- Fernandezia ecuadorensis (Dodson) M.W.Chase
- Fernandezia espinosae Ormerod
- Fernandezia falcifolia (Rchb.f.) M.W.Chase
- Fernandezia gracillima (C.Schweinf.) M.W.Chase
- Fernandezia hagsateri (Dodson) M.W.Chase
- Fernandezia hamiltonii Ormerod
- Fernandezia harlingii Ormerod
- Fernandezia herzogii (Schltr.) ined.
- Fernandezia hispidula (Rchb.f.) M.W.Chase
- Fernandezia ichneumonea Ormerod
- Fernandezia ionanthera (Rchb.f. & Warsz.) Schltr.
- Fernandezia jordaniae Ormerod
- Fernandezia kosnipatae Ormerod
- Fernandezia luerorum Ormerod
- Fernandezia lycopodioides (Schltr.) M.W.Chase
- Fernandezia maculata Garay & Dunst.
- Fernandezia mandonii Ormerod
- Fernandezia mercadoi Ormerod
- Fernandezia mexicana (Dressler & Hágsater) M.W.Chase
- Fernandezia micrantha (Schltr.) M.W.Chase
- Fernandezia militaris Ormerod
- Fernandezia minor M.W.Chase
- Fernandezia myrtillus (Rchb.f.) Garay & Dunst.
- Fernandezia nigrosignata (Kraenzl.) Garay & Dunst.
- Fernandezia nunezii Ormerod
- Fernandezia pandurata Ormerod
- Fernandezia parvifolia (Lindl.) M.W.Chase
- Fernandezia pastinaca Ormerod
- Fernandezia pastorelliae D.Trujillo
- Fernandezia pectinata (Rchb.f.) M.W.Chase
- Fernandezia piesikii (Szlach., Mytnik & Rutk.) M.W.Chase
- Fernandezia pseudodichaea (Rchb.f.) M.W.Chase
- Fernandezia pseudominor Ormerod
- Fernandezia putumayoensis (Szlach., Kolan. & Oledrz.) Molinari & Mayta
- Fernandezia quadrangularis Ormerod
- Fernandezia rubescens Ormerod
- Fernandezia rubicunda Ormerod
- Fernandezia salliquensis Ormerod
- Fernandezia sanguinea (Lindl.) Garay & Dunst.
- Fernandezia schultesii (L.O.Williams) Carnevali & Dorr
- Fernandezia scimitaris Ormerod
- Fernandezia serra (Rchb.f.) M.W.Chase
- Fernandezia shoveliformis Ormerod
- Fernandezia solomonii Ormerod
- Fernandezia squarrosa (Lindl.) M.W.Chase
- Fernandezia steinbachii Ormerod
- Fernandezia subbiflora Ruiz & Pav.
- Fernandezia tajacayaensis (D.E.Benn. & Christenson) M.W.Chase
- Fernandezia tenuis (Schltr.) M.W.Chase
- Fernandezia teranii Ormerod
- Fernandezia theodorii M.W.Chase
- Fernandezia tinquiana Ormerod
- Fernandezia tintasensis Ormerod
- Fernandezia tortuosa (Foldats) M.W.Chase
- Fernandezia transversalis Ormerod
- Fernandezia unduaviae Ormerod
- Fernandezia vaginata (Schltr.) M.W.Chase
- Fernandezia vanderwerffii Ormerod
- Fernandezia vargasii Ormerod
- Fernandezia weberbaueri Ormerod
- Fernandezia yahuarcocha Ormerod

== See also ==
- List of Orchidaceae genera
