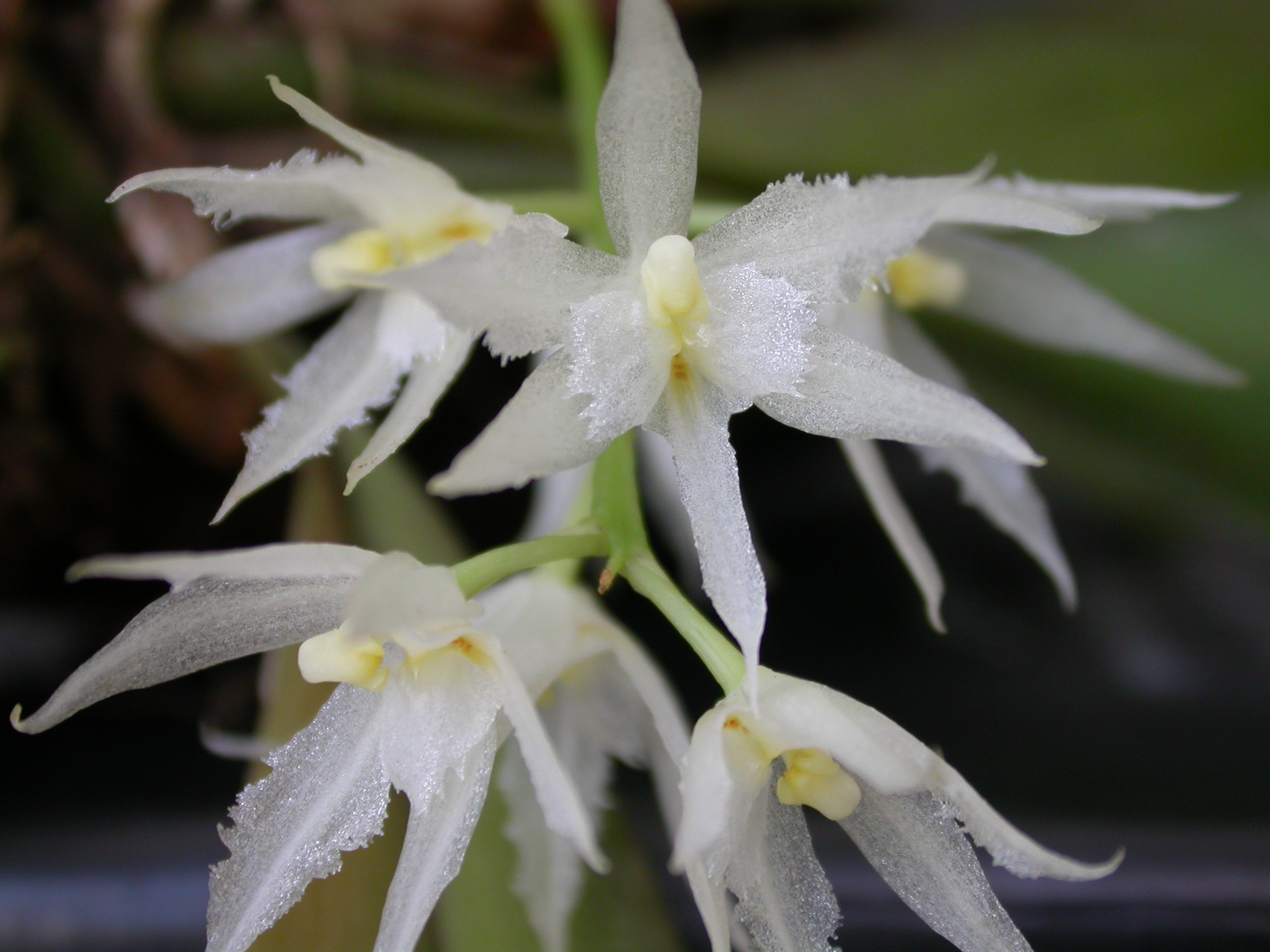
- Warmingia eugenii

Scientific classification
- Kingdom: Plantae
- Clade: Embryophytes
- Clade: Tracheophytes
- Clade: Spermatophytes
- Clade: Angiosperms
- Clade: Monocots
- Order: Asparagales
- Family: Orchidaceae
- Subfamily: Epidendroideae
- Tribe: Cymbidieae
- Subtribe: Oncidiinae
- Genus: Warmingia; Rchb.f.

= Warmingia =

Genus of orchids

Warmingia is a genus of orchids. It includes four species from the tropical Americas, native to Costa Rica, Colombia and Ecuador, and northeastern Brazil to Bolivia and northeastern Argentina.

== Species ==
Four species are accepted.

- Warmingia buchtienii (Schltr.) Schltr. ex Garay & Christenson – Bolivia
- Warmingia eugenii Rchb.f. – eastern and southern Brazil, Paraguay, and northeastern Argentina (Misiones Province)
- Warmingia holopetala Kraenzl. – southeastern Brazil (Minas Gerais)
- Warmingia zamorana Dodson – Costa Rica, northwestern Colombia, and Ecuador
