= Platyrhiza =

Scientific classification
- Kingdom: Plantae
- Clade: Tracheophytes
- Clade: Angiosperms
- Clade: Monocots
- Order: Asparagales
- Family: Orchidaceae
- Subfamily: Epidendroideae
- Tribe: Cymbidieae
- Subtribe: Oncidiinae
- Genus: Platyrhiza; Barb.Rodr.
- Species: P. quadricolor

Binomial name
- Platyrhiza quadricolor Barb.Rodr.

Synonyms
- Platyrhiza juergensii Schltr.

Genus of orchids

Platyrhiza is a monotypic genus of flowering plants from the orchid family, Orchidaceae. The sole species is Platyrhiza quadricolor, endemic to Brazil.

== See also ==
- List of Orchidaceae genera
