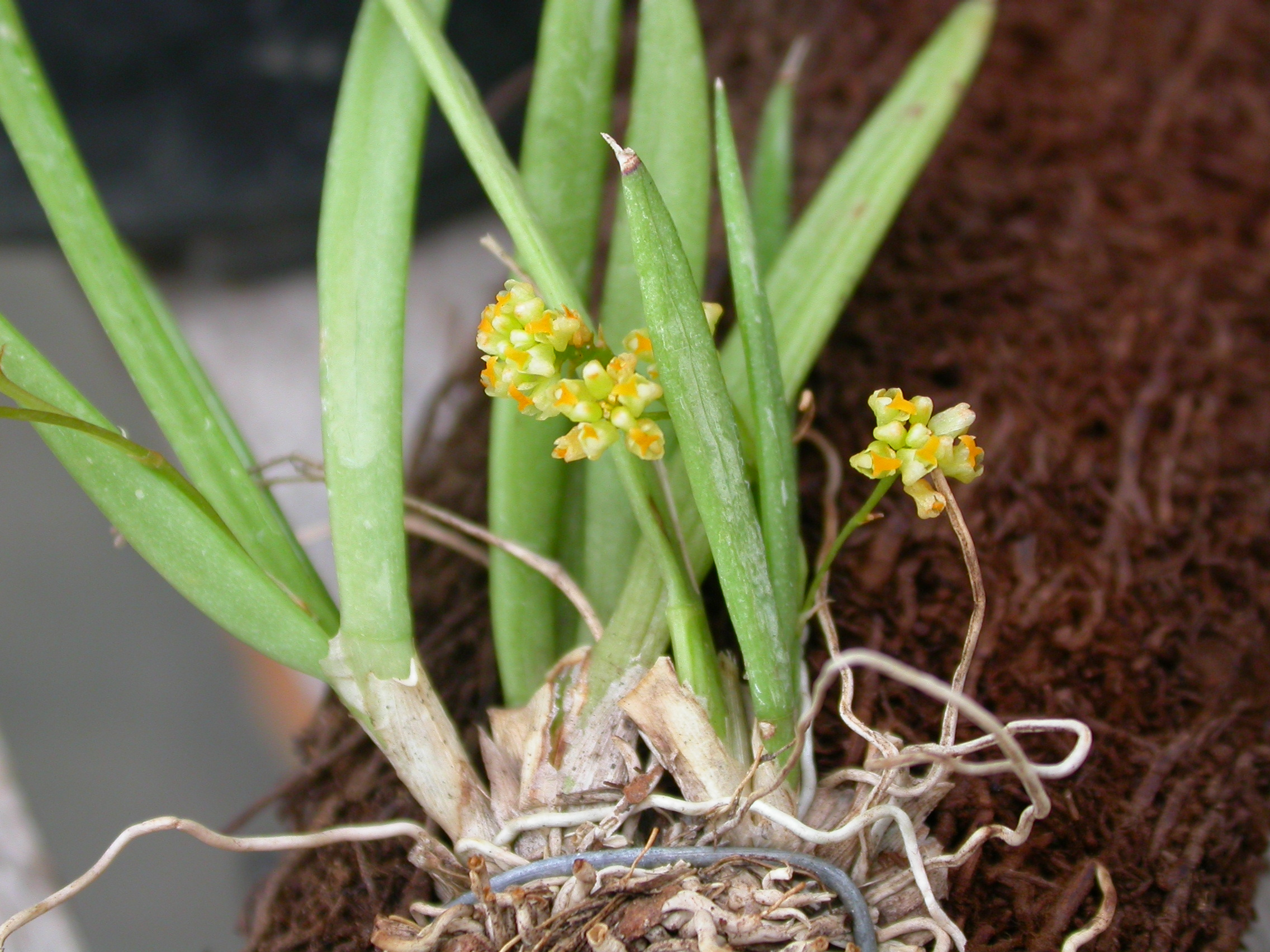

Scientific classification
- Kingdom: Plantae
- Clade: Tracheophytes
- Clade: Angiosperms
- Clade: Monocots
- Order: Asparagales
- Family: Orchidaceae
- Subfamily: Epidendroideae
- Tribe: Cymbidieae
- Subtribe: Oncidiinae
- Genus: Trizeuxis; Lindl.
- Species: T. falcata

Binomial name
- Trizeuxis falcata Lindl.

Synonyms
- Trizeuxis andina Schltr.

= Trizeuxis =

Genus of orchids

Trizeuxis is a monotypic genus of flowering plants from the orchid family, Orchidaceae. The sole species is Trizeuxis falcata, native to the American Tropics (Trinidad, Venezuela, Colombia, the Guianas, Costa Rica, Panama, Brazil, Ecuador, Peru and Bolivia).

== See also ==
- List of Orchidaceae genera
