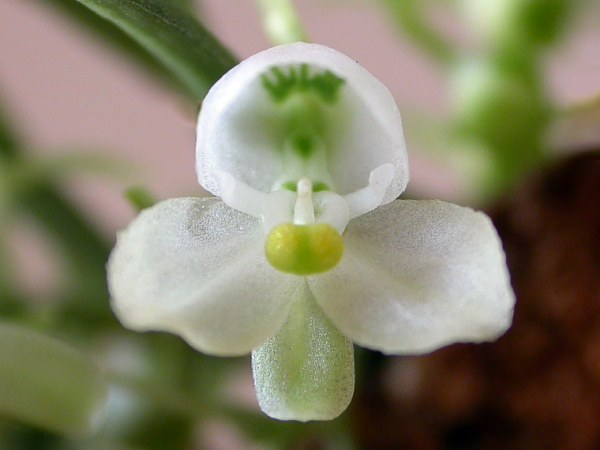
- Centroglossa macroceras

Scientific classification
- Kingdom: Plantae
- Clade: Tracheophytes
- Clade: Angiosperms
- Clade: Monocots
- Order: Asparagales
- Family: Orchidaceae
- Subfamily: Epidendroideae
- Tribe: Cymbidieae
- Subtribe: Oncidiinae
- Genus: Centroglossa; Barb.Rodr.

= Centroglossa =

Genus of orchids

Centroglossa is a genus of flowering plants from the orchid family, Orchidaceae. It contains 5 accepted species, all endemic to Brazil:

1. Centroglossa castellensis Brade - Espírito Santo
2. Centroglossa greeniana (Rchb.f.) Cogn. in C.F.P.von Martius - Rio de Janeiro, São Paulo
3. Centroglossa macroceras Barb.Rodr.
4. Centroglossa nunes-limae Porto & Brade - Minas Gerais, Espírito Santo
5. Centroglossa tripollinica (Barb.Rodr.) Barb.Rodr.

== See also ==
- List of Orchidaceae genera
