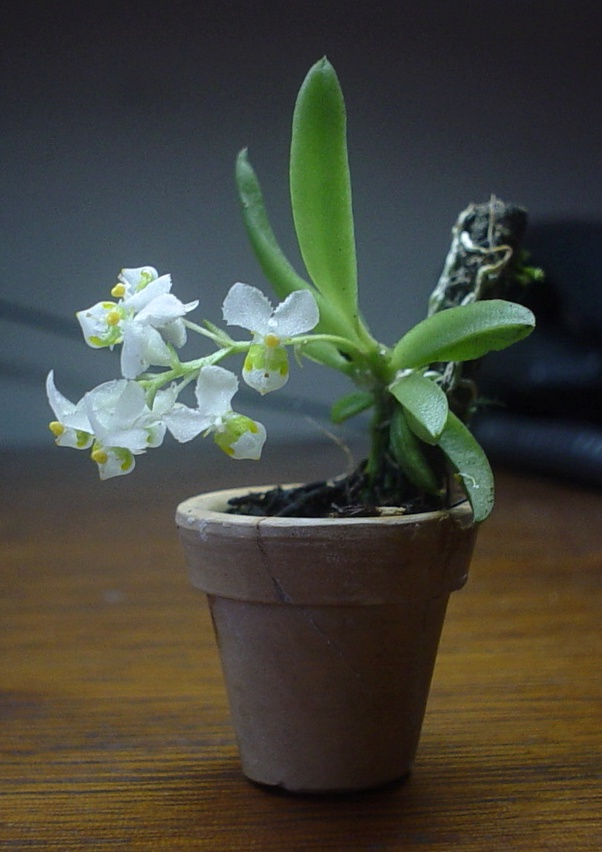
- Zygostates papillosa

Scientific classification
- Kingdom: Plantae
- Clade: Tracheophytes
- Clade: Angiosperms
- Clade: Monocots
- Order: Asparagales
- Family: Orchidaceae
- Subfamily: Epidendroideae
- Tribe: Cymbidieae
- Subtribe: Oncidiinae
- Genus: Zygostates; Lindl.

Species
- Zygostates alleniana; Zygostates apiculata; Zygostates aquinoi; Zygostates bradei; Zygostates chateaubriandii; Zygostates comuta; Zygostates cornigera; Zygostates costaricensis; Zygostates dusenianus; Zygostates grandiflorus; Zygostates greeniana; Zygostates kuhlmanni; Zygostates leptosepala; Zygostates ligulata; Zygostates lindmanii; Zygostates linearisepala; Zygostates lunata; Zygostates multiflora; Zygostates obliqua; Zygostates octavioreisii; Zygostates ovatipetala; Zygostates papillosa; Zygostates paranaensis; Zygostates pellucida; Zygostates pustulata; Zygostates riefenstahliae; Zygostates rotundiglossa

Synonyms
- Dactylostylis Scheidw.; Dipteranthus Barb.Rodr.

= Zygostates =

Genus of orchids

Zygostates is a genus of orchids widespread across much of South America from Guyana to Argentina.

The word is from the Greek ζυγοστάτης (zygostates, weigher, balance) and refers to the projections from the base of the column which resemble a balance.
