= Quekettia =

Quekettia may refer to:

- Quekettia (plant), a plant genus in the family Orchidaceae
- Quekettia (spider), an animal genus in the family Salticidae
