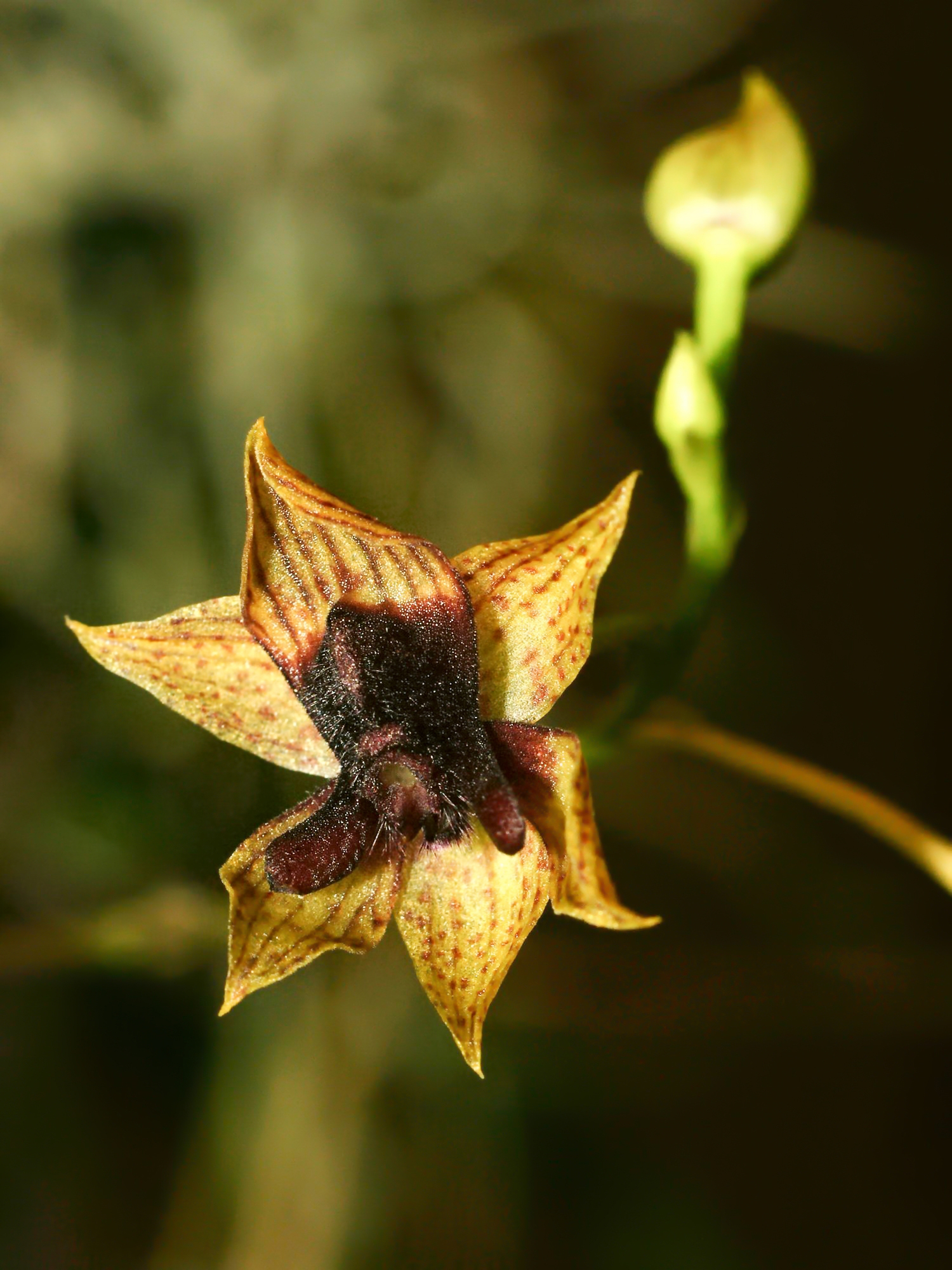
- Trichoceros muralis

Scientific classification
- Kingdom: Plantae
- Clade: Tracheophytes
- Clade: Angiosperms
- Clade: Monocots
- Order: Asparagales
- Family: Orchidaceae
- Subfamily: Epidendroideae
- Tribe: Cymbidieae
- Subtribe: Oncidiinae
- Genus: Trichoceros; Kunth in F.W.H.von Humboldt, A.J.A.Bonpland & C.S.Kunth

Type species
- Trichoceros antennifer

= Trichoceros =

Genus of orchids

Trichoceros is a genus of flowering plants from the orchid family, Orchidaceae. The genus is endemic to South America.

== Species ==
Species accepted as of June 2014:

Image	Name	Distribution	Elevation (m)
	Trichoceros antennifer (Humb. & Bonpl.) Kunth in F.W.H.von Humboldt, A.J.A.Bonpland & C.S.Kunth	Bolivia, Colombia, Ecuador, Peru	1,800–4,100 metres (5,900–13,500 ft)
	Trichoceros carinifer Schltr.	Ecuador	
	Trichoceros cristinae P.Ortiz & C.Uribe	Colombia	
	Trichoceros dombeyi D.E.Benn. & Christenson	Peru	2,600–3,200 metres (8,500–10,500 ft)
	Trichoceros hajekiorum D.E.Benn. & Christenson	Peru	3,200–3,300 metres (10,500–10,800 ft)
	Trichoceros muralis Lindl.	Ecuador	2,200–3,200 metres (7,200–10,500 ft)
	Trichoceros onaensis Christenson	Ecuador	2,400 metres (7,900 ft)
	Trichoceros platyceros Rchb.f.	Peru, Ecuador	2,250–3,000 metres (7,380–9,840 ft)
	Trichoceros roseus Christenson	Ecuador	2,200 to 2,700 metres (7,200 to 8,900 ft)
	Trichoceros tupaipi Rchb.f.	Peru	2,600–3,500 metres (8,500–11,500 ft)

== See also ==
- List of Orchidaceae genera
