= Notyliopsis =

Scientific classification
- Kingdom: Plantae
- Clade: Tracheophytes
- Clade: Angiosperms
- Clade: Monocots
- Order: Asparagales
- Family: Orchidaceae
- Subfamily: Epidendroideae
- Tribe: Cymbidieae
- Subtribe: Oncidiinae
- Genus: Notyliopsis; P.Ortiz
- Species: N. beatricis

Binomial name
- Notyliopsis beatricis P.Ortiz

Genus of plants

Notyliopsis is a monotypic genus of flowering plants belonging to the family Orchidaceae. The only species is Notyliopsis beatricis.

Its native range is Colombia.
