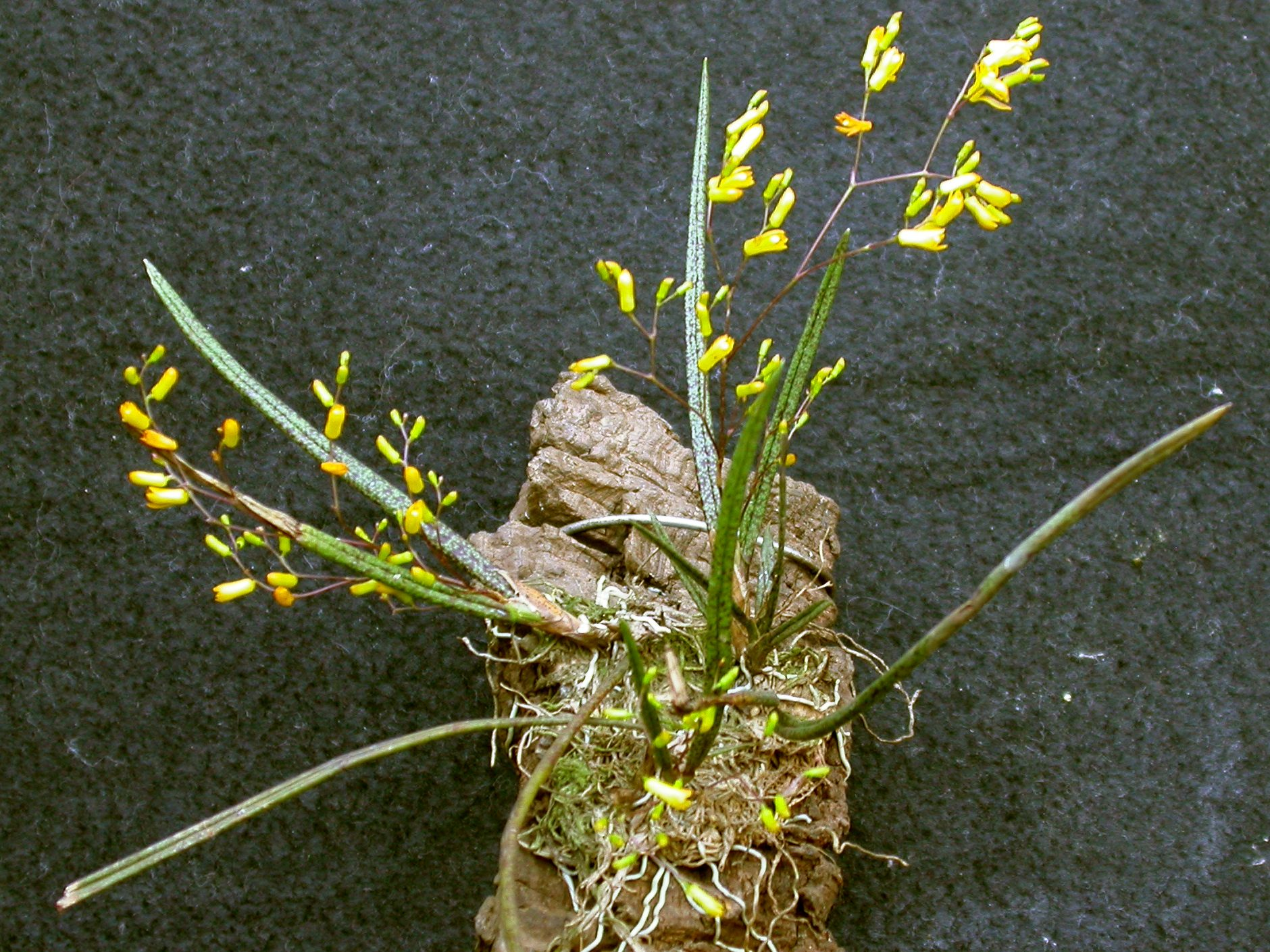
- Quekettia papillosa

Scientific classification
- Kingdom: Plantae
- Clade: Tracheophytes
- Clade: Angiosperms
- Clade: Monocots
- Order: Asparagales
- Family: Orchidaceae
- Subfamily: Epidendroideae
- Tribe: Cymbidieae
- Subtribe: Oncidiinae
- Genus: Quekettia; Lindl., 1839

Type species
- Quekettia microscopica Lindl. in W.T.Aiton (1839)

Synonyms
- Stictophyllum Dodson & M.W.Chase 1989, illegitimate homonym, not Edgew. 1845; Stictophyllorchis Dodson & Carnevali; Scolopendrogyne Szlach. & Mytnik.

= Quekettia (plant) =

Genus of orchids

Quekettia is a small genus of orchids classified in the subtribe Oncidiinae. This genus is found in the humid lowlands of Brazil, the Guianas, Venezuela, Ecuador and Trinidad.

The trade of these orchids is controlled to avoid use incompatible with species survival

The name commemorates the author and microscopist Edwin John Quekett.

== Species ==
Species accepted as of June 2014:

1. Quekettia microscopica Lindl. (French Guiana, Guyana, Suriname, Venezuela, NE Brazil)
2. Quekettia papillosa Garay (Suriname, Pará)
3. Quekettia pygmaea (Cogn.) Garay & R.E.Schult. (Venezuela, Ecuador, Brazil, Trinidad)
4. Quekettia vermeuleniana Determann (Suriname)

formerly included

moved to: Capanemia

1. Q. australis - Capanemia micromera
2. Q. carinata - Capanemia carinata
3. Q. duseniana - Capanemia theresae
4. Q. longirostellata - Capanemia theresae
5. Q. micromera - Capanemia micromera
6. Q. theresae - Capanemia theresae
