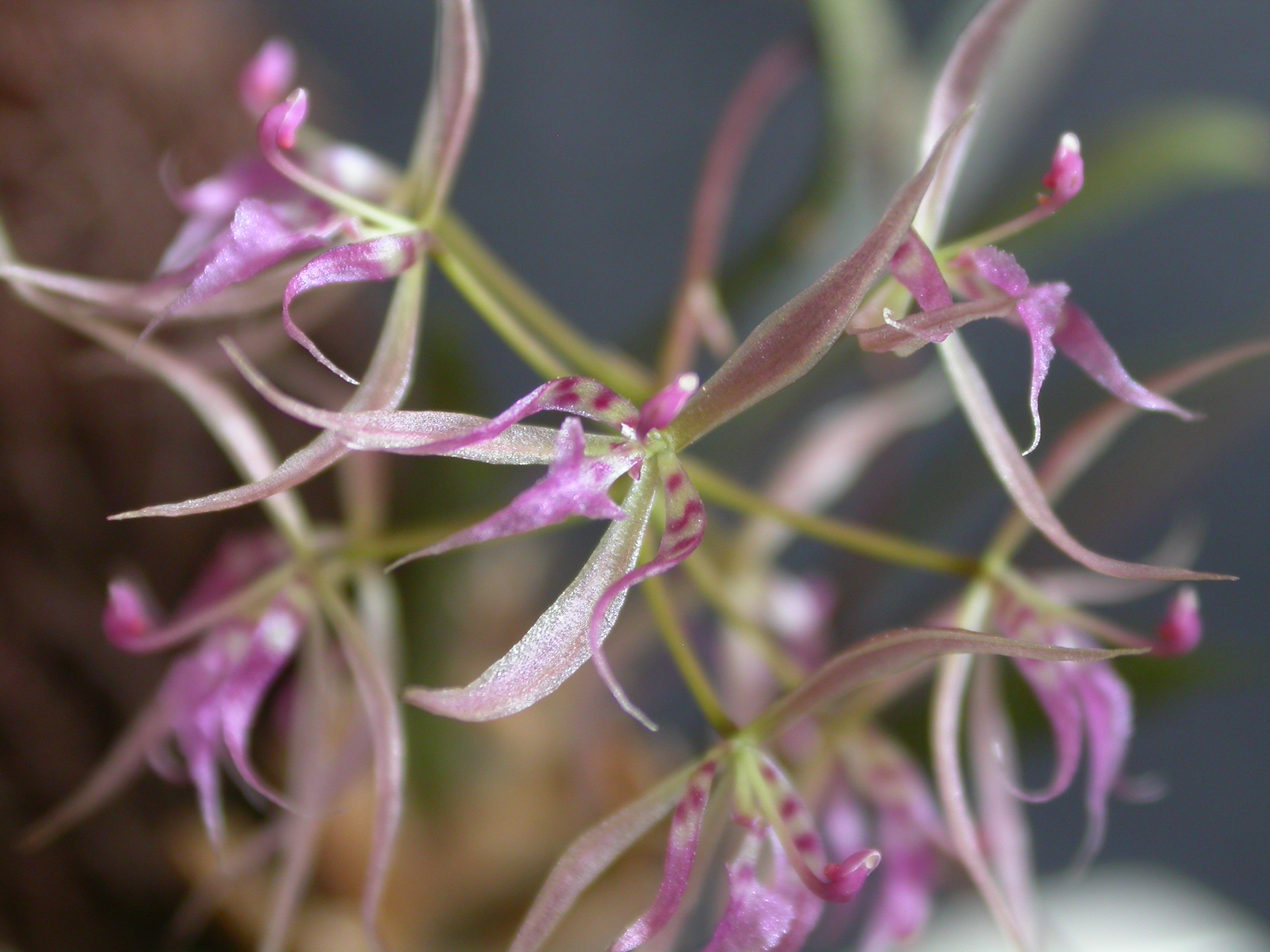
- Macroclinium wullschlaegelianum

Scientific classification
- Kingdom: Plantae
- Clade: Embryophytes
- Clade: Tracheophytes
- Clade: Spermatophytes
- Clade: Angiosperms
- Clade: Monocots
- Order: Asparagales
- Family: Orchidaceae
- Subfamily: Epidendroideae
- Tribe: Cymbidieae
- Subtribe: Oncidiinae
- Genus: Macroclinium; Barb.Rodr.

Synonyms
- Sarmenticola Senghas & Garay

= Macroclinium =

Genus of orchids

Macroclinium is a genus of flowering plants from the orchid family, Orchidaceae. It contains about 30-40 species native to the tropical Western Hemisphere.

== See also ==
- List of Orchidaceae genera
