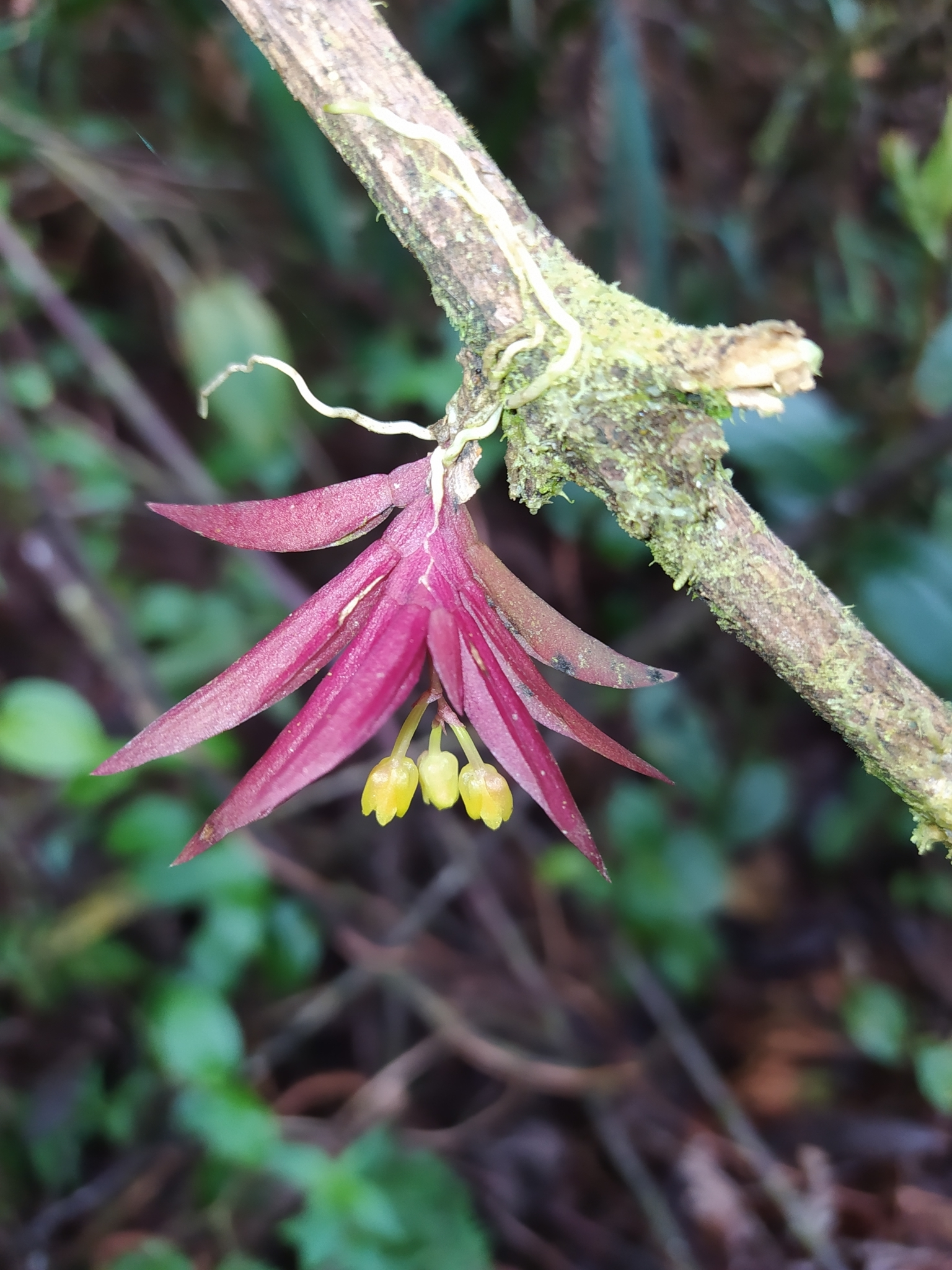
- Pterostemma antioquiense

Scientific classification
- Kingdom: Plantae
- Clade: Tracheophytes
- Clade: Angiosperms
- Clade: Monocots
- Order: Asparagales
- Family: Orchidaceae
- Subfamily: Epidendroideae
- Tribe: Cymbidieae
- Subtribe: Oncidiinae
- Genus: Pterostemma; Kraenzl.

Synonyms
- Hirtzia Dodson

= Pterostemma =

Genus of orchids

Pterostemma is a genus of flowering plants from the orchid family, Orchidaceae. It contains 3 known species, native to Colombia and Ecuador.

Species accepted as of June 2014:

- Pterostemma antioquiense F.Lehm. & Kraenzl.
- Pterostemma benzingii (Dodson) M.W.Chase & N.H.Williams
- Pterostemma escobarii (Dodson) M.W.Chase & N.H.Williams

== See also ==
- List of Orchidaceae genera
