= Suarezia ecuadorana =

Scientific classification
- Kingdom: Plantae
- Clade: Tracheophytes
- Clade: Angiosperms
- Clade: Monocots
- Order: Asparagales
- Family: Orchidaceae
- Subfamily: Epidendroideae
- Tribe: Cymbidieae
- Subtribe: Oncidiinae
- Genus: Suarezia; Dodson
- Species: S. ecuadorana

Binomial name
- Suarezia ecuadorana Dodson

Species of orchid

Suarezia is a monotypic genus of flowering plants from the orchid family, Orchidaceae. The sole species is Suarezia ecuadorana, endemic to Ecuador and classified as vulnerable.

== See also ==
- List of Orchidaceae genera
