= Cypholoron =

Scientific classification
- Kingdom: Plantae
- Clade: Tracheophytes
- Clade: Angiosperms
- Clade: Monocots
- Order: Asparagales
- Family: Orchidaceae
- Subfamily: Epidendroideae
- Tribe: Cymbidieae
- Subtribe: Oncidiinae
- Genus: Cypholoron; Dodson & Dressler

Type species
- Cypholoron frigidum Dodson & Dressler

Genus of orchids

Cypholoron is a genus of flowering plants from the orchid family, Orchidaceae. It contains only two known species, both native to South America.

- Cypholoron convexum Schuit. & de Vogel - Venezuela
- Cypholoron frigidum Dodson & Dressler - Ecuador

== See also ==
- List of Orchidaceae genera
