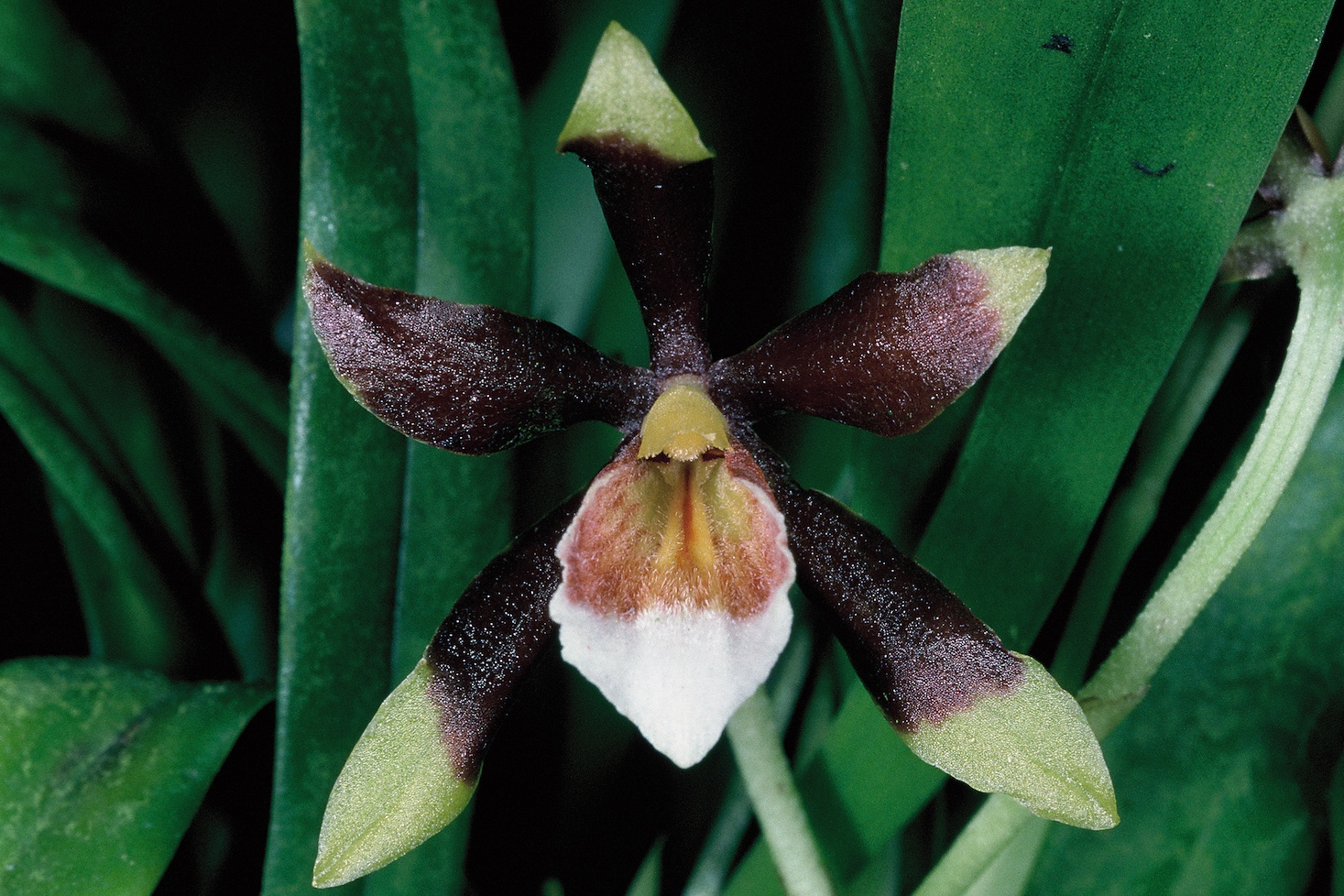
- Cischweinfia pusilla

Scientific classification
- Kingdom: Plantae
- Clade: Tracheophytes
- Clade: Angiosperms
- Clade: Monocots
- Order: Asparagales
- Family: Orchidaceae
- Subfamily: Epidendroideae
- Tribe: Cymbidieae
- Subtribe: Oncidiinae
- Genus: Cischweinfia; Dressler & N.H.Williams, 1970

Type species
- Aspasia pusilla C.Schweinf.

= Cischweinfia =

Genus of orchids

Cischweinfia is a genus of flowering plants from the orchid family, Orchidaceae. It was named after Harvard orchidologist Charles Schweinfurth. It has thirteen currently recognized species, all native to Central America and northwestern South America.

== Species ==
- Cischweinfia colombiana Garay - Colombia
- Cischweinfia dasyandra (Rchb.f.) Dressler & N.H.Williams - Colombia, Ecuador, Panama, Costa Rica
- Cischweinfia donrafae Dressler & Dalström - Costa Rica
- Cischweinfia gersonii Pupulin, Bogarín & Karremans - Costa Rica
- Cischweinfia jarae Dodson & D.E.Benn. - Ecuador, Peru, Bolivia
- Cischweinfia leucocheila H.Medina & J.Portilla - Ecuador
- Cischweinfia nana Dressler - Panama
- Cischweinfia parva (C.Schweinf.) Dressler & N.H.Williams - Ecuador, Peru, Bolivia, Colombia
- Cischweinfia platychila Garay - Colombia
- Cischweinfia popowiana Königer - Ecuador
- Cischweinfia pusilla (C.Schweinf.) Dressler & N.H.Williams - Colombia, Panama, Costa Rica
- Cischweinfia pygmaea (Pupulin, J.Valle & G.Merino) M.W.Chase - Ecuador
- Cischweinfia rostrata Dressler & N.H.Williams - Colombia, Ecuador

== See also ==
- List of Orchidaceae genera
