= Eloyella =

Scientific classification
- Kingdom: Plantae
- Clade: Tracheophytes
- Clade: Angiosperms
- Clade: Monocots
- Order: Asparagales
- Family: Orchidaceae
- Subfamily: Epidendroideae
- Tribe: Cymbidieae
- Subtribe: Oncidiinae
- Genus: Eloyella; P.Ortiz

Genus of orchids

Eloyella is a genus of flowering plants from the orchid family, Orchidaceae. It contains 10 known species, native to Panama and to northern South America:

1. Eloyella antioquiensis (P.Ortiz) P.Ortiz - Colombia
2. Eloyella bifida D.E.Benn. & Christenson - Peru
3. Eloyella cundinamarcae (P.Ortiz) P.Ortiz - Colombia
4. Eloyella dalstroemii Dodson - Ecuador
5. Eloyella jostii Dodson & Dalström - Ecuador
6. Eloyella mendietae Dodson & L.Jost - Ecuador
7. Eloyella panamensis (Dressler) Dodson - Panama, Colombia, Venezuela, Guyana, Ecuador
8. Eloyella thienii Dodson - Ecuador
9. Eloyella thivii Senghas - Bolivia
10. Eloyella werneri Dodson & Dalström - Ecuador

== See also ==
- List of Orchidaceae genera
