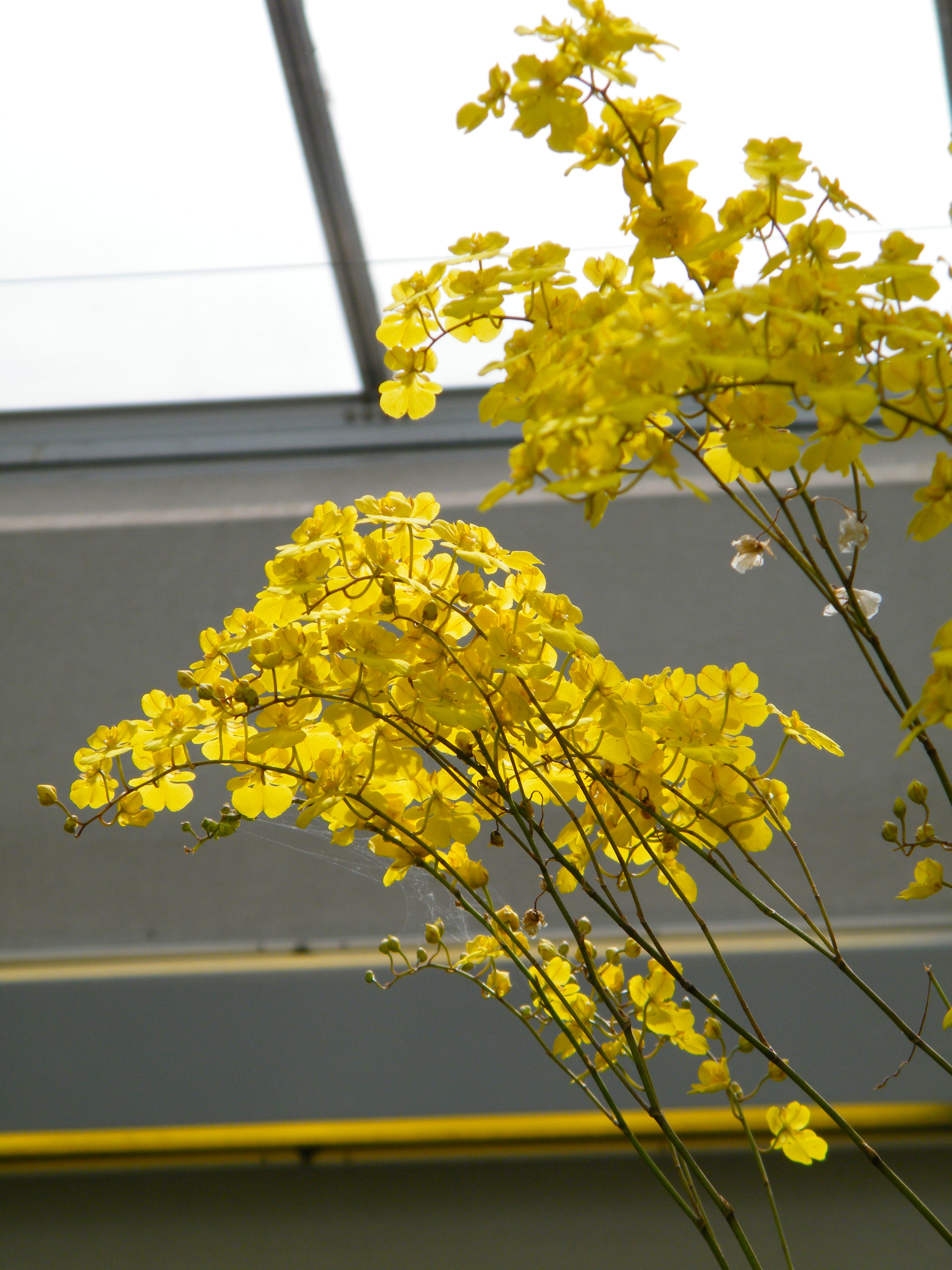
- Inflorescences

Scientific classification
- Kingdom: Plantae
- Clade: Tracheophytes
- Clade: Angiosperms
- Clade: Monocots
- Order: Asparagales
- Family: Orchidaceae
- Subfamily: Epidendroideae
- Tribe: Cymbidieae
- Subtribe: Oncidiinae
- Genus: Zelenkoa; M.W.Chase & N.H.Williams
- Species: Z. onusta

Binomial name
- Zelenkoa onusta (Lindl.) M.W.Chase & N.H.Williams

Synonyms
- Oncidium onustum Lindl.

= Zelenkoa =

Species of plant

Zelenkoa is a genus of flowering plants from the orchid family, Orchidaceae. It contains only one known species, Zelenkoa onusta, native to Ecuador and Peru.

Zelenkoa onusta is an epiphytic desert orchid, that survives in the harsh conditions of dry forests in southwestern Ecuador and northwestern Peru between sea level and 1200 meters, growing on trees and cacti. Flowers are 2.cm wide.

== See also ==
- List of Orchidaceae genera
