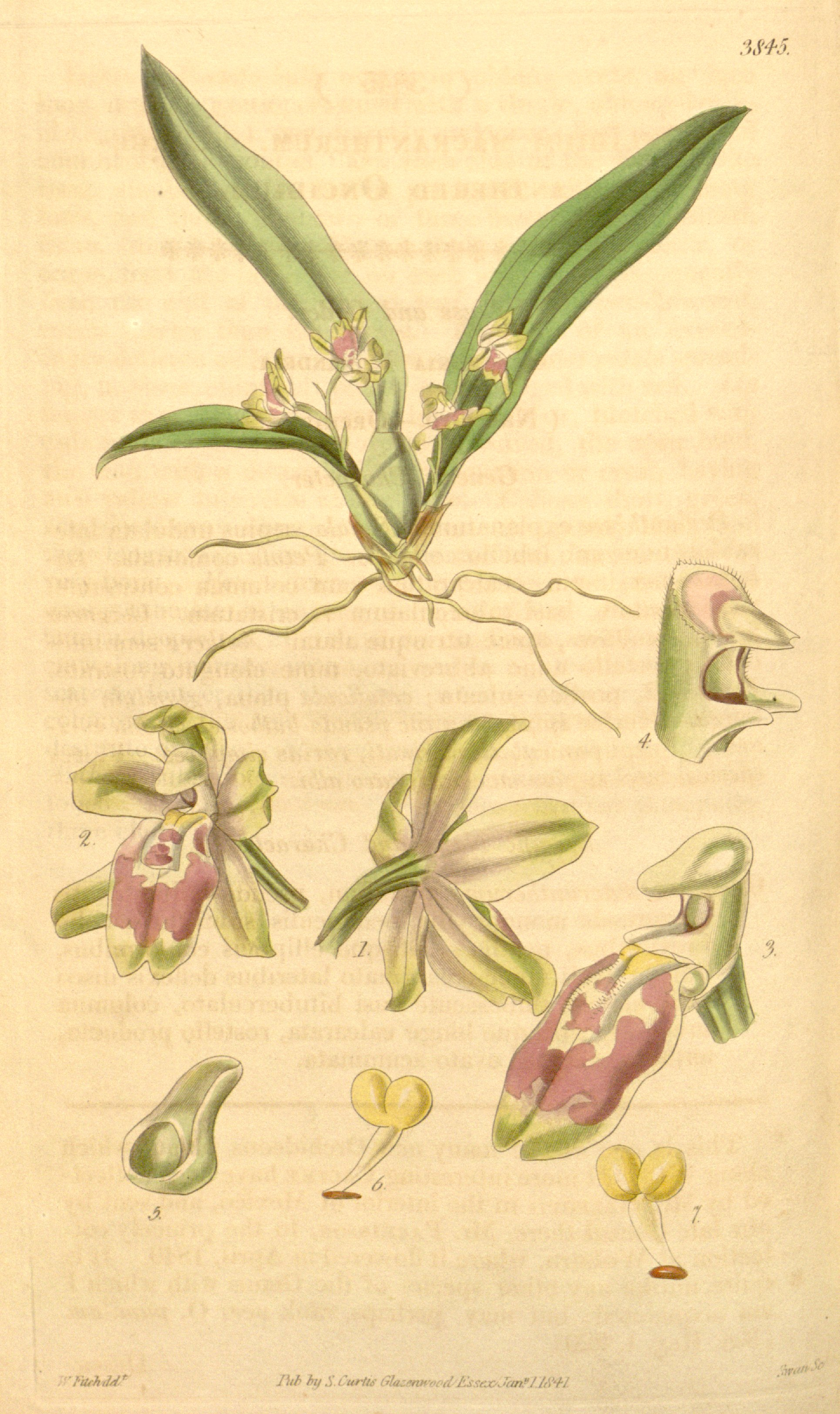
- Leochilus oncidioides 1841 illustration

Scientific classification
- Kingdom: Plantae
- Clade: Tracheophytes
- Clade: Angiosperms
- Clade: Monocots
- Order: Asparagales
- Family: Orchidaceae
- Subfamily: Epidendroideae
- Tribe: Cymbidieae
- Subtribe: Oncidiinae
- Genus: Leochilus; Knowles & Westc.

Synonyms
- Cryptosanus Scheidw; Papperitzia Rchb.f.; Leiochilus Benth.; Hybochilus Schltr.; Goniochilus M.W.Chase

= Leochilus =

Genus of orchids

Leochilus is a genus of flowering plants from the orchid family, Orchidaceae, native to Mexico, Central America, northern South America, the West Indies and Florida.

1. Leochilus carinatus (Knowles & Westc.) Lindl. - Oaxaca, Veracruz
2. Leochilus crocodiliceps (Rchb.f.) Kraenzl. in H.G.A.Engler - Jalisco, Colima
3. Leochilus hagsateri M.W.Chase - Oaxaca
4. Leochilus inconspicuus (Kraenzl.) M.W.Chase & N.H.Williams - Costa Rica
5. Leochilus johnstonii Ames & Correll - from Oaxaca south to Nicaragua
6. Leochilus labiatus (Sw.) Kuntze - from Oaxaca south to Brazil; also West Indies and Florida
7. Leochilus leiboldii Rchb.f. - Oaxaca, Veracruz
8. Leochilus leochilinus (Rchb.f.) M.W.Chase & N.H.Williams - Nicaragua, Costa Rica, Panama
9. Leochilus oncidioides Knowles & Westc. - Mexico, Guatemala, Honduras
10. Leochilus puertoricensis M.W.Chase - Puerto Rico, St. Lucia
11. Leochilus scriptus (Scheidw.) Rchb.f. - from southern Mexico south to Ecuador; also Cuba, Trinidad, Dominican Republic
12. Leochilus tricuspidatus (Rchb.f.) Kraenzl. in H.G.A.Engler - Costa Rica, Panama

== See also ==
- List of Orchidaceae genera
