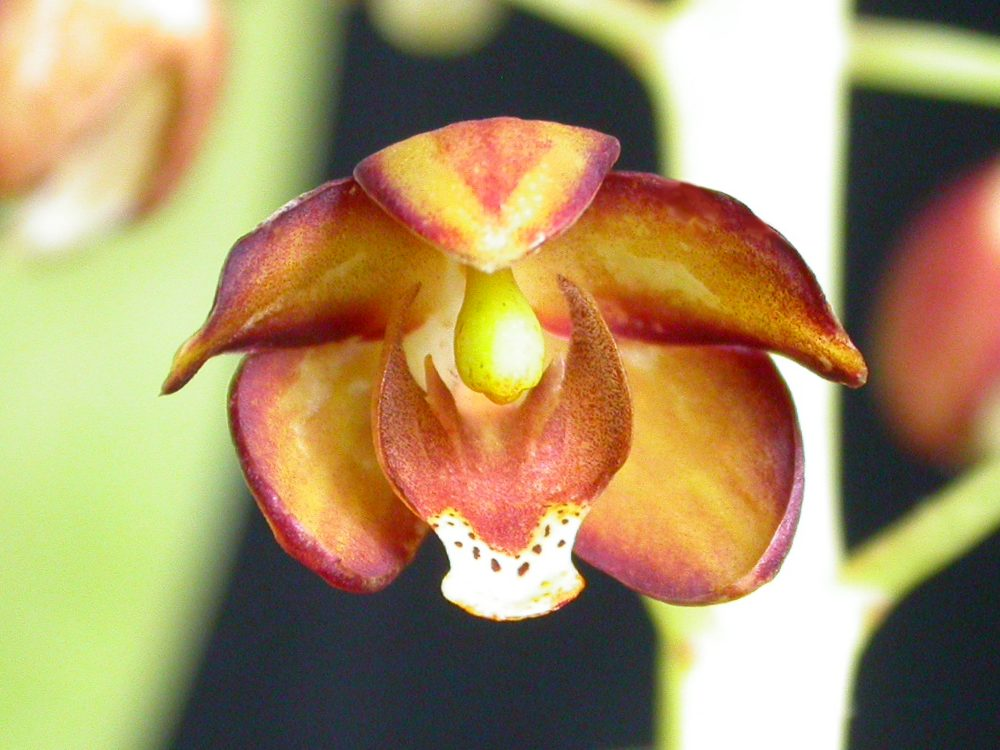
- Eriopsis biloba (type species)

Scientific classification
- Kingdom: Plantae
- Clade: Tracheophytes
- Clade: Angiosperms
- Clade: Monocots
- Order: Asparagales
- Family: Orchidaceae
- Subfamily: Epidendroideae
- Tribe: Cymbidieae
- Subtribe: Eriopsidinae; Szlach.
- Genus: Eriopsis; Lindl.

Synonyms
- Pseuderiopsis Rchb.f.

= Eriopsis =

Genus of orchids

Eriopsis is a genus of flowering plants from the orchid family, Orchidaceae. Its species are native to South America and Central America.

- Eriopsis biloba Lindl.
- Eriopsis grandibulbosa Ames & C.Schweinf.
- Eriopsis mesae Kraenzl.
- Eriopsis rutidobulbon Hook.
- Eriopsis sceptrum Rchb.f. & Warsz.

== See also ==
- List of Orchidaceae genera

== Bibliography ==
- Lindley, J. (1847) Edward's Botanical Register, 33: t. 18.
- Berg Pana, H. 2005. Handbuch der Orchideen-Namen. Dictionary of Orchid Names. Dizionario dei nomi delle orchidee. Ulmer, Stuttgart
- Pridgeon, A.M., Cribb, P.J., Chase, M.C. & Rasmussen, F.N. (2009) Epidendroideae (Part two). Genera Orchidacearum 5: 88. Oxford University Press.
