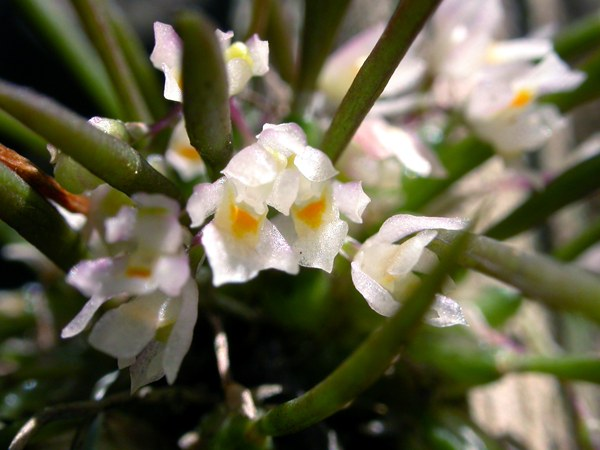
- Capanemia micromera

Scientific classification
- Kingdom: Plantae
- Clade: Tracheophytes
- Clade: Angiosperms
- Clade: Monocots
- Order: Asparagales
- Family: Orchidaceae
- Subfamily: Epidendroideae
- Tribe: Cymbidieae
- Subtribe: Oncidiinae
- Genus: Capanemia; Barb.Rodr.

Type species
- Capanemia micromera Barb.Rodr.

= Capanemia =

Genus of orchids

Capanemia is a genus of flowering plants from the orchid family, Orchidaceae. It contains 9 recognized species, all from South America:

1. Capanemia adelaidae Porto & Brade - Brazil
2. Capanemia brachycion (Griseb.) Schltr. - Rio Grande do Sul, northern and eastern Argentina, Paraguay, Uruguay
3. Capanemia carinata Barb.Rodr. - Minas Gerais, São Paulo
4. Capanemia gehrtii Hoehne - Brazil
5. Capanemia micromera Barb.Rodr. - Bolivia, Brazil, Argentina, Paraguay, Uruguay
6. Capanemia paranaensis Schltr. - Paraná
7. Capanemia pygmaea (Kraenzl.) Schltr. - Brazil, probably extinct
8. Capanemia superflua (Rchb.f.) Garay - Brazil, Argentina, Paraguay
9. Capanemia theresae Barb.Rodr. - Brazil

== See also ==
- List of Orchidaceae genera
