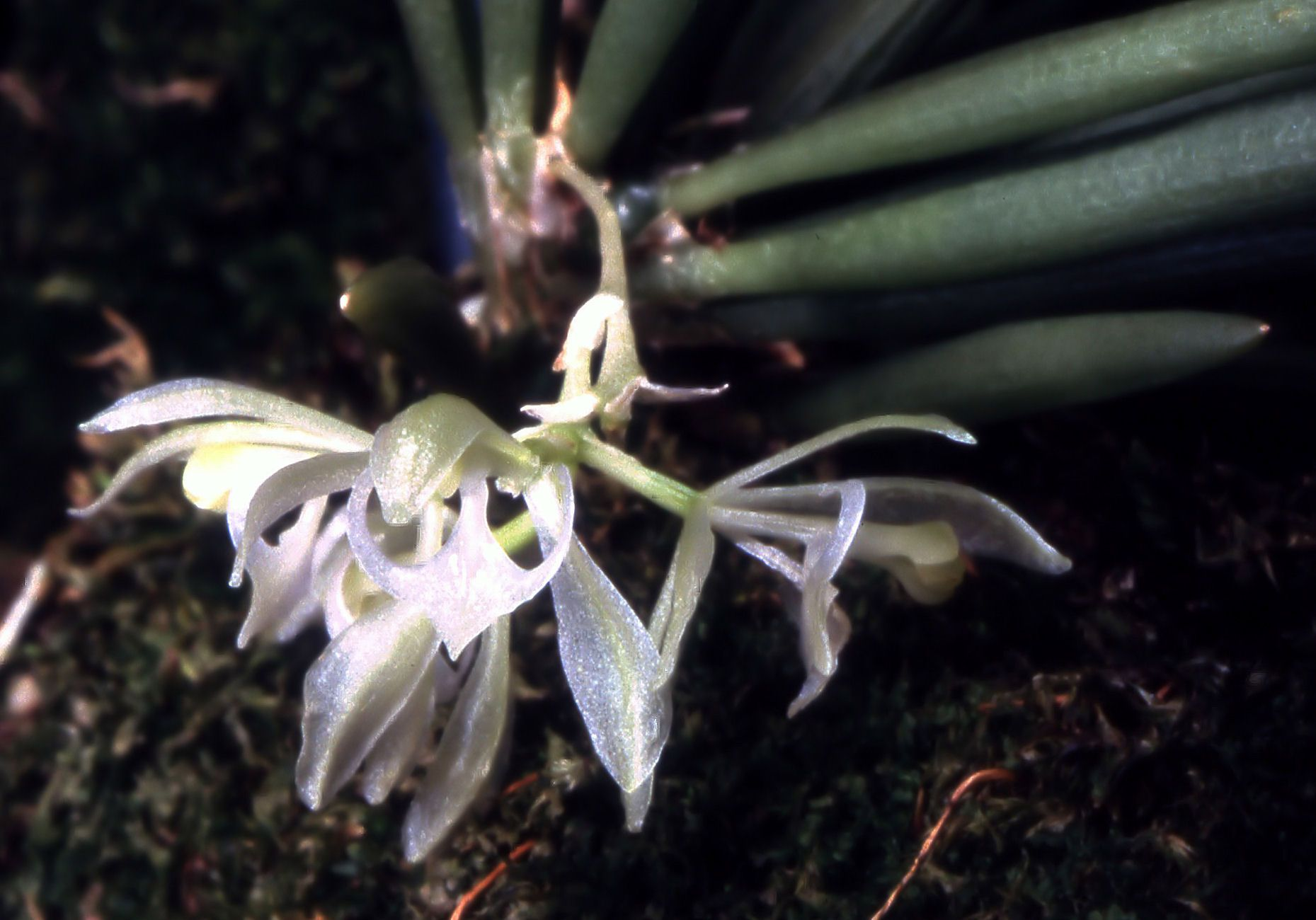
- Seegeriella pinifolia

Scientific classification
- Kingdom: Plantae
- Clade: Embryophytes
- Clade: Tracheophytes
- Clade: Spermatophytes
- Clade: Angiosperms
- Clade: Monocots
- Order: Asparagales
- Family: Orchidaceae
- Subfamily: Epidendroideae
- Tribe: Cymbidieae
- Subtribe: Oncidiinae
- Genus: Seegeriella; Senghas

= Seegeriella =

Genus of flowering plants

Seegeriella is a genus of flowering plants belonging to the family Orchidaceae.

It is native to Bolivia, Ecuador and Peru in western South America.

The genus name of Seegeriella is in honour of Hans Gerhard Seeger (b. 1939), German gardener at botanical gardens in Göttingen, Hanover and Heidelberg. It was first described and published in J. Orchideenfr. Vol.4 on page 190 in 1997.

== Known species ==
According to Kew:

- Seegeriella crothersii Pupulin & H.Medina
- Seegeriella pinifolia Senghas
- Seegeriella senghasiana Vierling
