= Nohawilliamsia =

Scientific classification
- Kingdom: Plantae
- Clade: Tracheophytes
- Clade: Angiosperms
- Clade: Monocots
- Order: Asparagales
- Family: Orchidaceae
- Subfamily: Epidendroideae
- Tribe: Cymbidieae
- Genus: Nohawilliamsia; M.W.Chase & Whitten
- Species: N. pirarensis

Binomial name
- Nohawilliamsia pirarensis (Rchb.f.) M.W.Chase & Whitten

Synonyms
- Oncidium pirarense Rchb.f.; Ampliglossum pirarense (Rchb.f.) Campacci; Coppensia pirarensis (Rchb.f.) Campacci; Gomesa pirarensis (Rchb.f.) M.W.Chase & N.H.Williams; Oncidium orthostates Ridl.; Ampliglossum orthostates (Ridl.) Campacci; Coppensia orthostates (Ridl.) Campacci

Genus of orchids

Nohawilliamsia is a genus of flowering plants from the orchid family, Orchidaceae. Only one species is recognized as of June 2014, Nohawilliamsia pirarensis, native to northern South America (Venezuela, Guyana and northern Brazil).

== See also ==
- List of Orchidaceae genera
