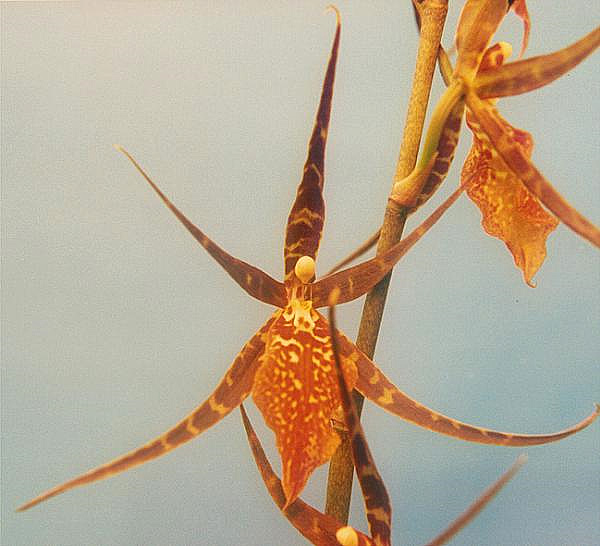
- Odontoglossum Big Mac × Brassia longissima

Scientific classification
- Kingdom: Plantae
- Clade: Tracheophytes
- Clade: Angiosperms
- Clade: Monocots
- Order: Asparagales
- Family: Orchidaceae
- Subfamily: Epidendroideae
- Tribe: Cymbidieae
- Subtribe: Oncidiinae; Benth.

Genera
- See text

= Oncidiinae =

Subtribe of flowering plants

The Oncidiinae is a subtribe within the Orchidaceae that consists of a number of genera that are closely related.

This subtribe consists of about 70 genera with over 1000 species, with Oncidium as its largest genus. These genera consist of a single floral type based on the angle of the attachment of the lip to the column, reflecting pollinator preferences. This has however led to several unreliable results and polyphyletic taxa within Oncidium. These were transferred to Gomesa and a new genus Nohawilliamsia, has been described for Oncidium orthostates

Most species have well-developed pseudobulbs and conduplicate leaves.

It is possible to form hybrids in some instances between multiple genera within the Oncidiinae. These hybrids are often colloquially referred to as "intergenerics."

== Genera ==
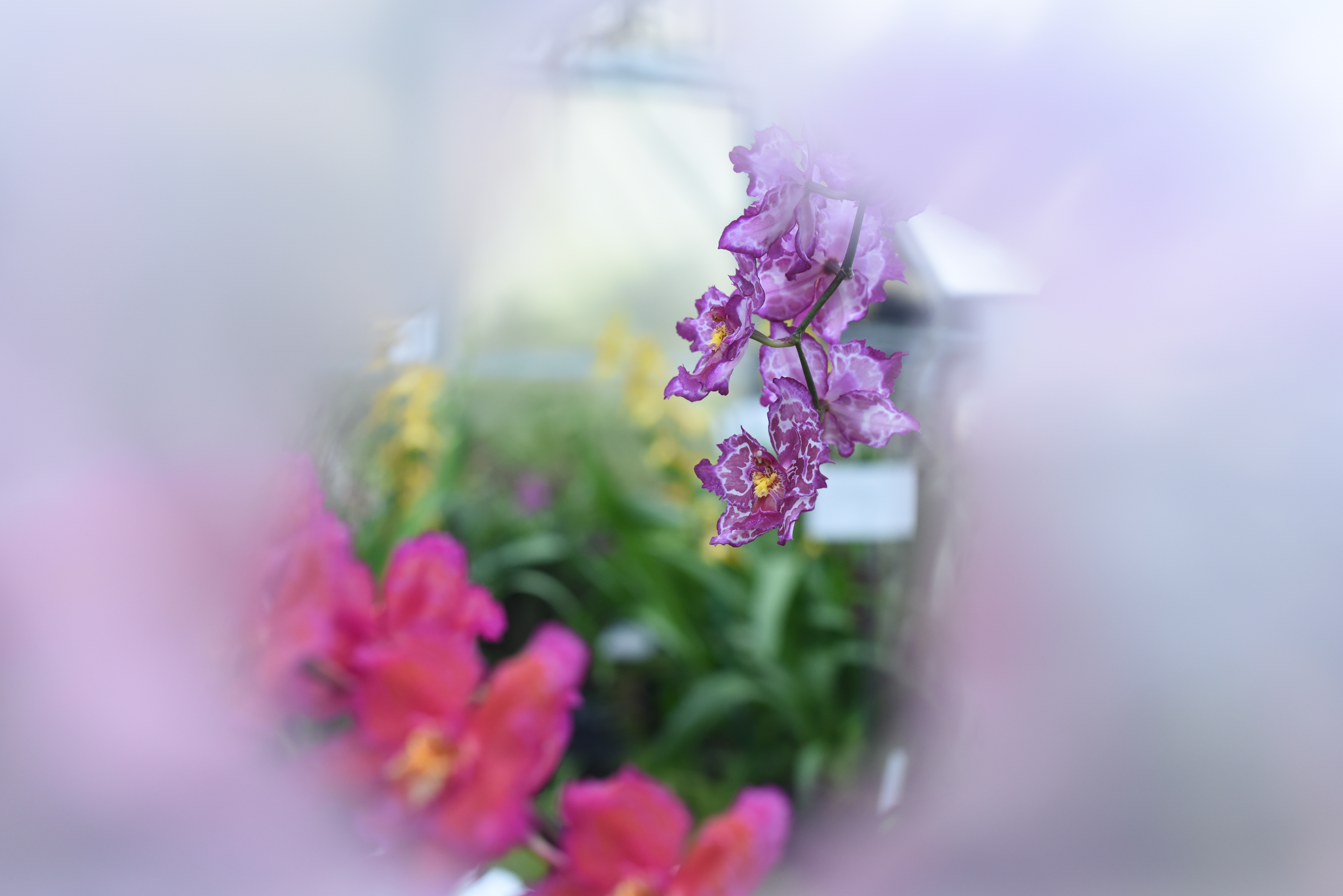
Orchid Oncidium (Prism x Picotee) × Crystal Palace

Genera recognized in Chase et al.'s 2015 classification of Orchidaceae:

- Aspasia
- Brassia
- Caluera
- Capanemia
- Caucaea
- Centroglossa
- Chytroglossa
- Cischweinfia
- Comparettia
- Cuitlauzina
- Cypholoron
- Cyrtochiloides
- Cyrtochilum
- Dunstervillea
- Eloyella
- Erycina
- Fernandezia
- Gomesa
- Grandiphyllum – synonym of Trichocentrum
- Hintonella
- Hofmeisterella
- Ionopsis
- Leochilus
- Lockhartia
- Macradenia
- Macroclinium
- Miltonia
- Miltoniopsis
- Notylia
- Notyliopsis
- Oliveriana
- Oncidium
- Ornithocephalus
- Otoglossum
- Phymatidium
- Platyrhiza
- Plectrophora
- Polyotidium
- Psychopsiella (sometimes included in Psychopsis)
- Psychopsis
- Pterostemma
- Quekettia
- Rauhiella
- Rhynchostele
- Rodriguezia
- Rossioglossum
- Sanderella
- Saundersia – synonym of Trichocentrum
- Schunkea
- Seegeriella
- Solenidium
- Suarezia
- Sutrina
- Systeloglossum
- Telipogon
- Thysanoglossa
- Tolumnia
- Trichocentrum
- Trichoceros
- Trichopilia
- Trizeuxis
- Vitekorchis
- Warmingia
- Zelenkoa
- Zygostates

In synonymy:

- Ada = Brassia
- Odontoglossum = Oncidium

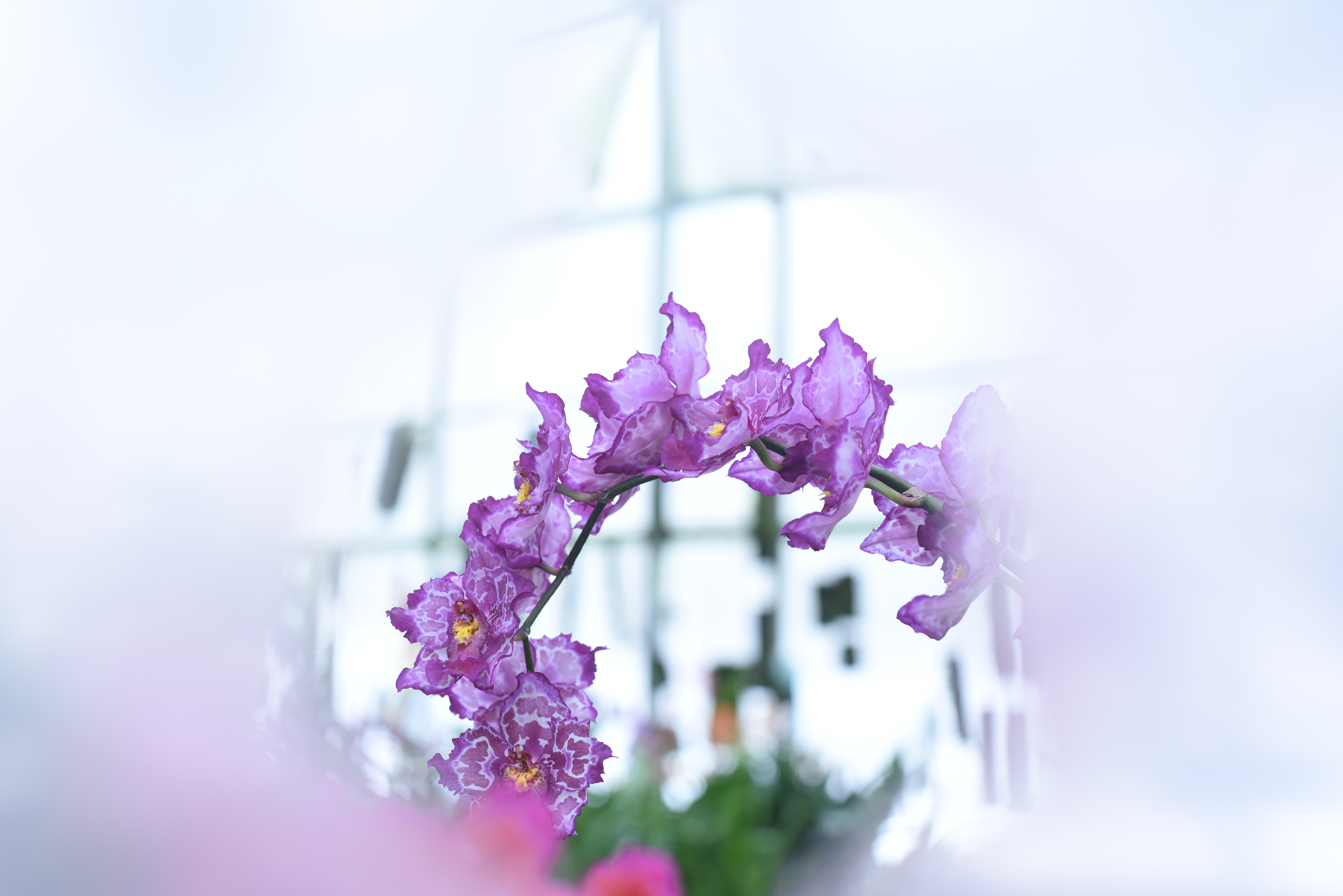
Orchid Oncidium (Prism x Picotee) × Crystal Palace, viewed from further out
