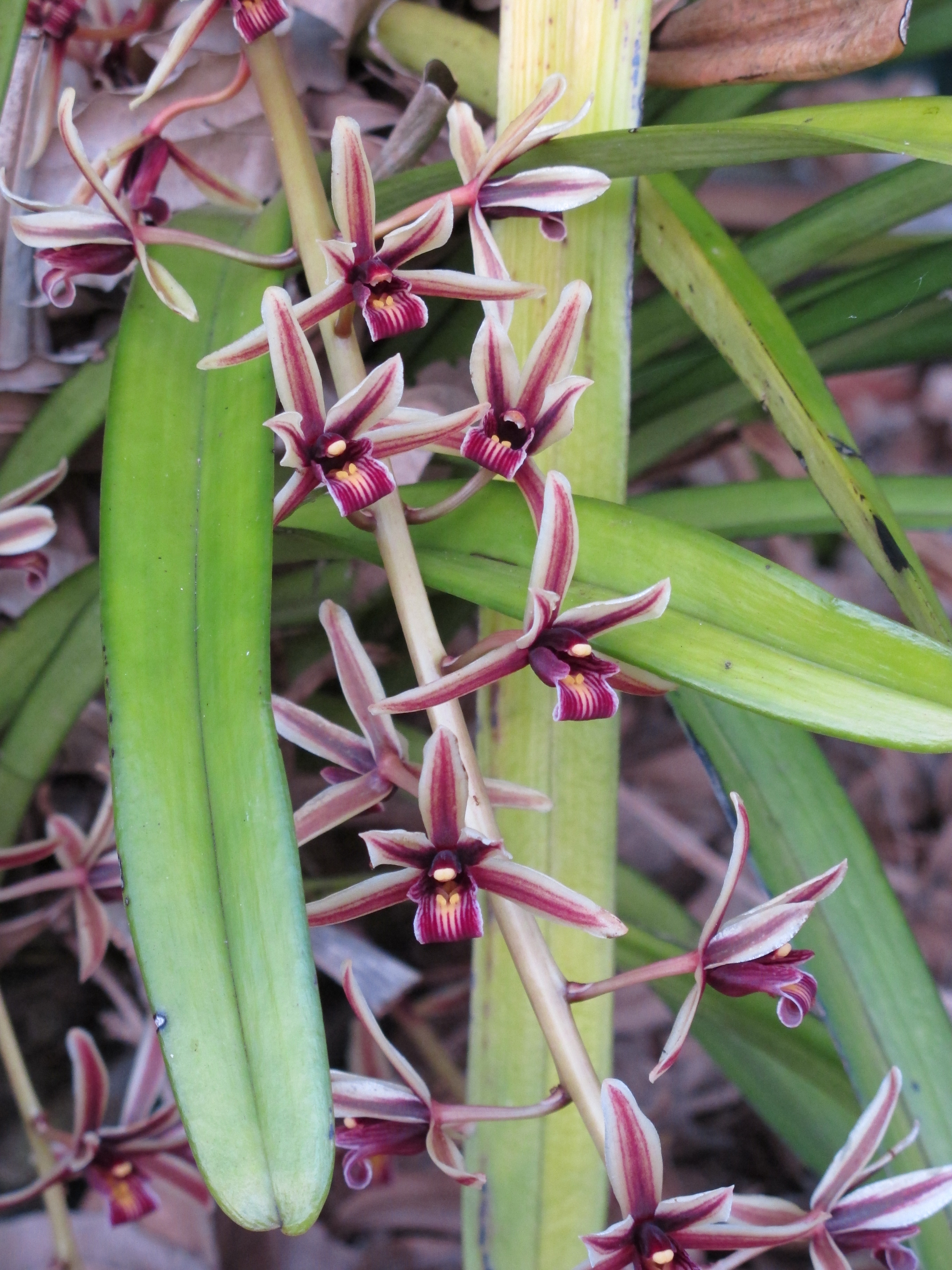
- Cymbidium aloifolium

Scientific classification
- Kingdom: Plantae
- Clade: Tracheophytes
- Clade: Angiosperms
- Clade: Monocots
- Order: Asparagales
- Family: Orchidaceae
- Subfamily: Epidendroideae
- Tribe: Cymbidieae; Pfitzer

Type genus
- Cymbidium

Synonyms
- Cycnochideae Rchb.f., 1885; Catasetiae Pfitzer, 1887; Cyrtopodieae Pfitzer, 1887; Dichaeae Pfitzer, 1887; Gongoreae Pfitzer, 1887; Huntleyeae Pfitzer, 1887; Lycasteae Pfitzer, 1887; Maxillarieae Pfitzer, 1887; Oncidieae Pfitzer, 1887; Stenieae Pfitzer, 1887; Telpogonieae Pfitzer, 1887; Therosteleae Pfitzer, 1887; Zygopeteleae Pfitzer, 1887; Galeandreae Dunsterv. & Garay, 1961; Ionopsideae Dunsterv. & Garay, 1961; Notyliaea Dunsterv. & Garay, 1961; Ornithocephaleae Dunsterv. & Garay, 1961; Dachyphylleae Dunsterv. & Garay, 1961; Vargesielleae Dunsterv. & Garay, 1961; Cryptarrheneneae (Dressler) 1971

= Cymbidieae =

Tribe of orchid plants

The Cymbidieae is a tribe of plants within the family Orchidaceae. The group is divided into the following subtribes:

- Catasetinae
- Coeliopsidinae
- Cymbidiinae
- Cyrtopodiinae
- Eriopsidinae
- Eulophiinae
- Maxillariinae
- Oncidiinae
- Stanhopeinae
- Dipodiinae
- Zygopetalinae

== Taxonomy ==
Phylogenetic relationships of Cymbidieae subtribes based on plastid and nuclear DNA in 2016
- Cymbidieae
  - - - - - - - - - - Stanhopeinae Benth.
                    - Coeliopsidinae Szlach.
                  - Maxillariinae Benth.
                - Zygopetalinae Schltr.
                - Eriopsidinae Szlach.
              - Oncidiinae Benth.
            - Eulophiinae Benth.
          - Catasetinae Lindl.
        - Cyrtopodiinae R.Br.
      - - Dipodiinae M.H. Li, Z.J. Liu & S.R. Lan
  - - Cymbidiinae Benth.

== See also ==
- Taxonomy of the Orchidaceae
