= × Forgetara =

Scientific classification
- Kingdom: Plantae
- Clade: Tracheophytes
- Clade: Angiosperms
- Clade: Monocots
- Order: Asparagales
- Family: Orchidaceae
- Subfamily: Epidendroideae
- Tribe: Cymbidieae
- Subtribe: Oncidiinae
- Genus: × Forgetara hort.

Genus of orchids

× Forgetara is a hybrid nothogenus of orchid. It is a part of the Oncidium alliance hybrids, a cross between Aspasia × Brassia × Miltonia. As of 2017 there are 70 species.

Abbreviation: Fgtra

Culture:

- Light: Moderate
- Temp.: Intermediate (day 70–80 °F (21–27 °C), night 55–65 °F (13–18 °C))
- water: allow to dry out between watering
- Flowers: about June to July

Species current:

Fgtra Everglades Pioneer '28 Hurrican' AM/AOS in 2004 (× Miltassia × Aspasia principissa)

Fgtra Everglades Pioneer 'Dottie Kone'

Fgtra Everglades Pioneer 'Talisman Cove'

Forgetara "Mexico"
