= B. cinnabarina =

B. cinnabarina may refer to:

- Baptodoris cinnabarina, a sea slug
- Brassia cinnabarina, a New World orchid
