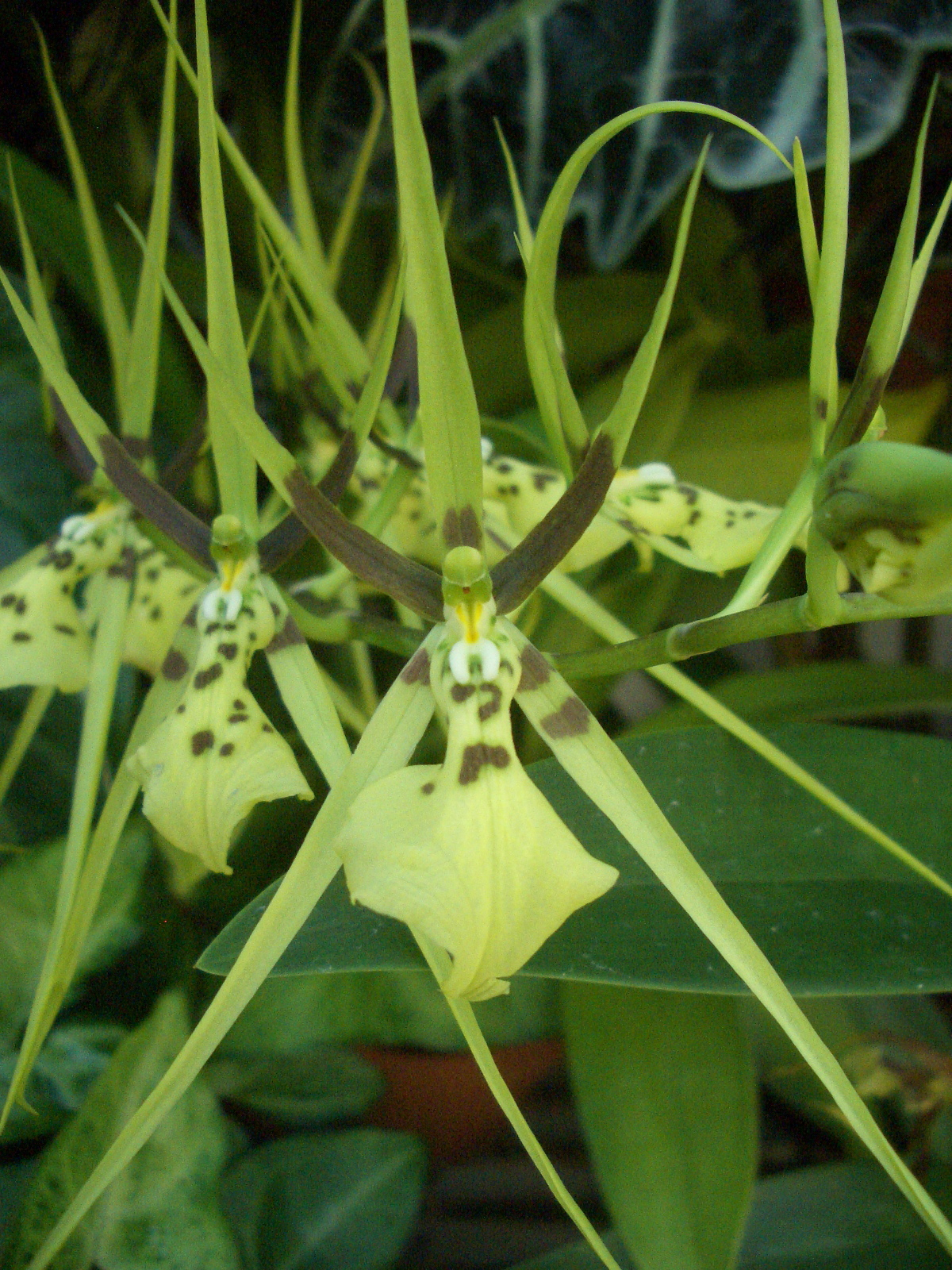

Scientific classification
- Kingdom: Plantae
- Clade: Tracheophytes
- Clade: Angiosperms
- Clade: Monocots
- Order: Asparagales
- Family: Orchidaceae
- Subfamily: Epidendroideae
- Genus: Brassia
- Species: B. gireoudiana

Binomial name
- Brassia gireoudiana Rchb.f. (1854)

Synonyms
- Oncidium gireaudianum (Rchb.f. & Warsz.) Rchb.f. (1863); Brassia verrucosa ssp. gireoudiana (Rchb.f. & Warsz.) Dressler & N.H. Williams (2003)

= Brassia gireoudiana =

Gireoud's brassia

Species of orchid

Brassia gireoudiana, or Gireoud's brassia, is a species of orchid. It is native to Costa Rica and Panama.
