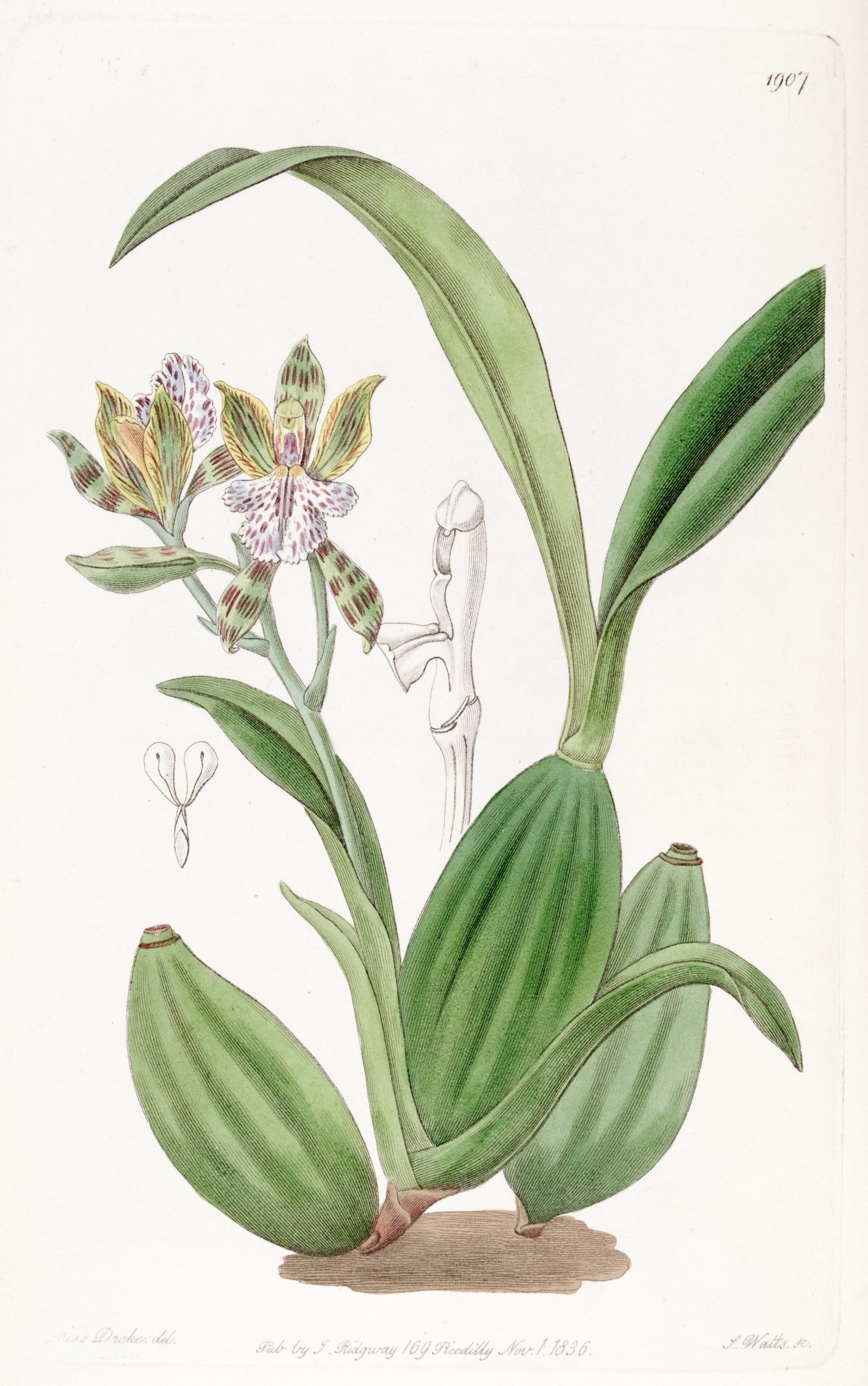
- 1836 illustration

Scientific classification
- Kingdom: Plantae
- Clade: Tracheophytes
- Clade: Angiosperms
- Clade: Monocots
- Order: Asparagales
- Family: Orchidaceae
- Subfamily: Epidendroideae
- Genus: Aspasia
- Species: A. variegata

Binomial name
- Aspasia variegata Lindl. (1836)

Synonyms
- Odontoglossum variegatum (Lindl.) Rchb.f. in W.G.Walpers (1864); Aspasia interrupta Hoffmanns. (1844); Aspasia liturata Link ex Rchb.f. (1855)

= Aspasia variegata =

Species of orchid

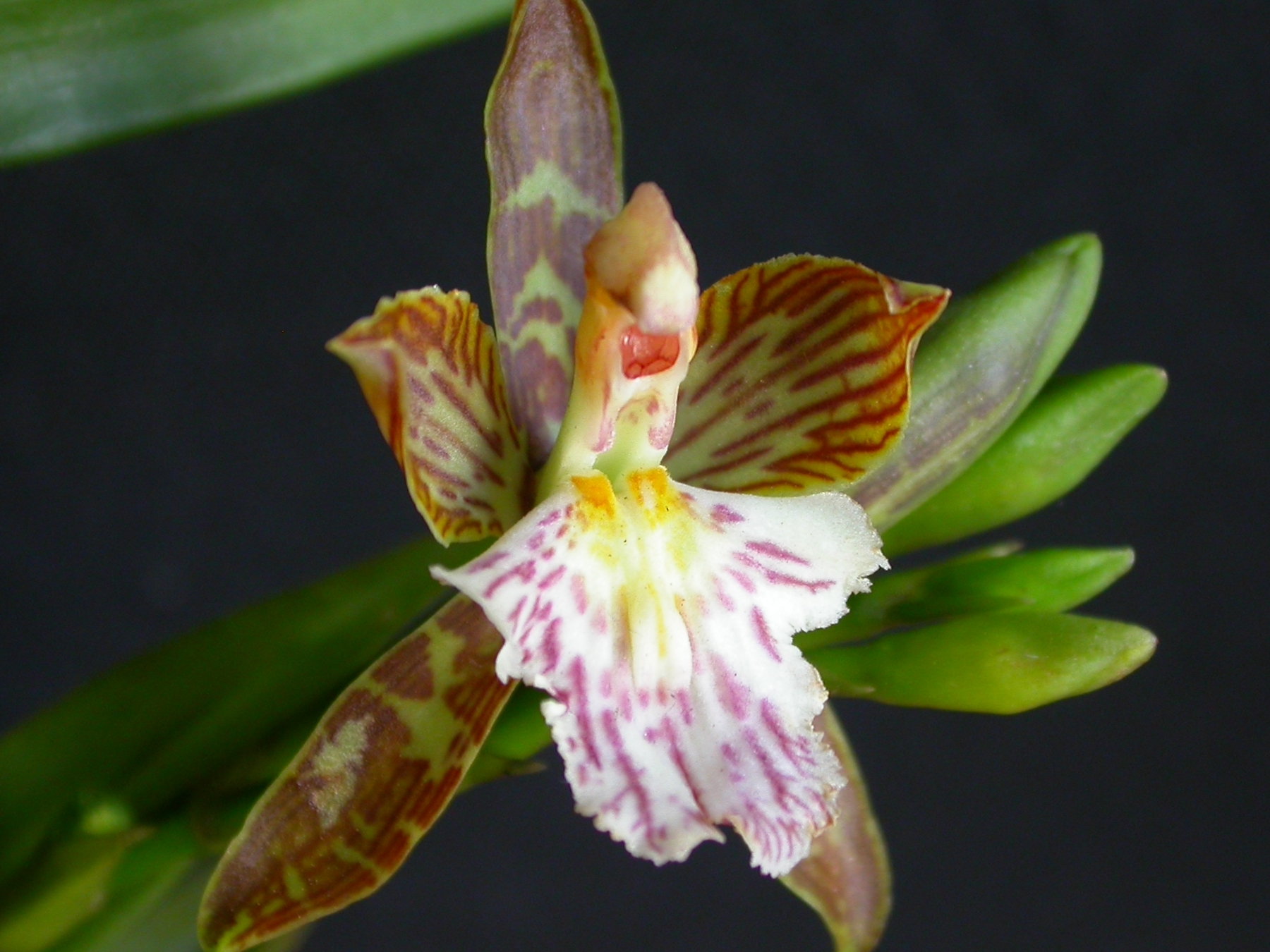
Aspasia variegata

Aspasia variegata is a species of orchid widespread across much of northern South America as well as Trinidad and the Amazonian region. It also occurs at elevations from 200–1,300 metres (660–4,270 ft) in Bolivia.

Aspasia variegata is found in open forests both in dry and flooded lands, then often on branches of the trees hanging over the waters.
