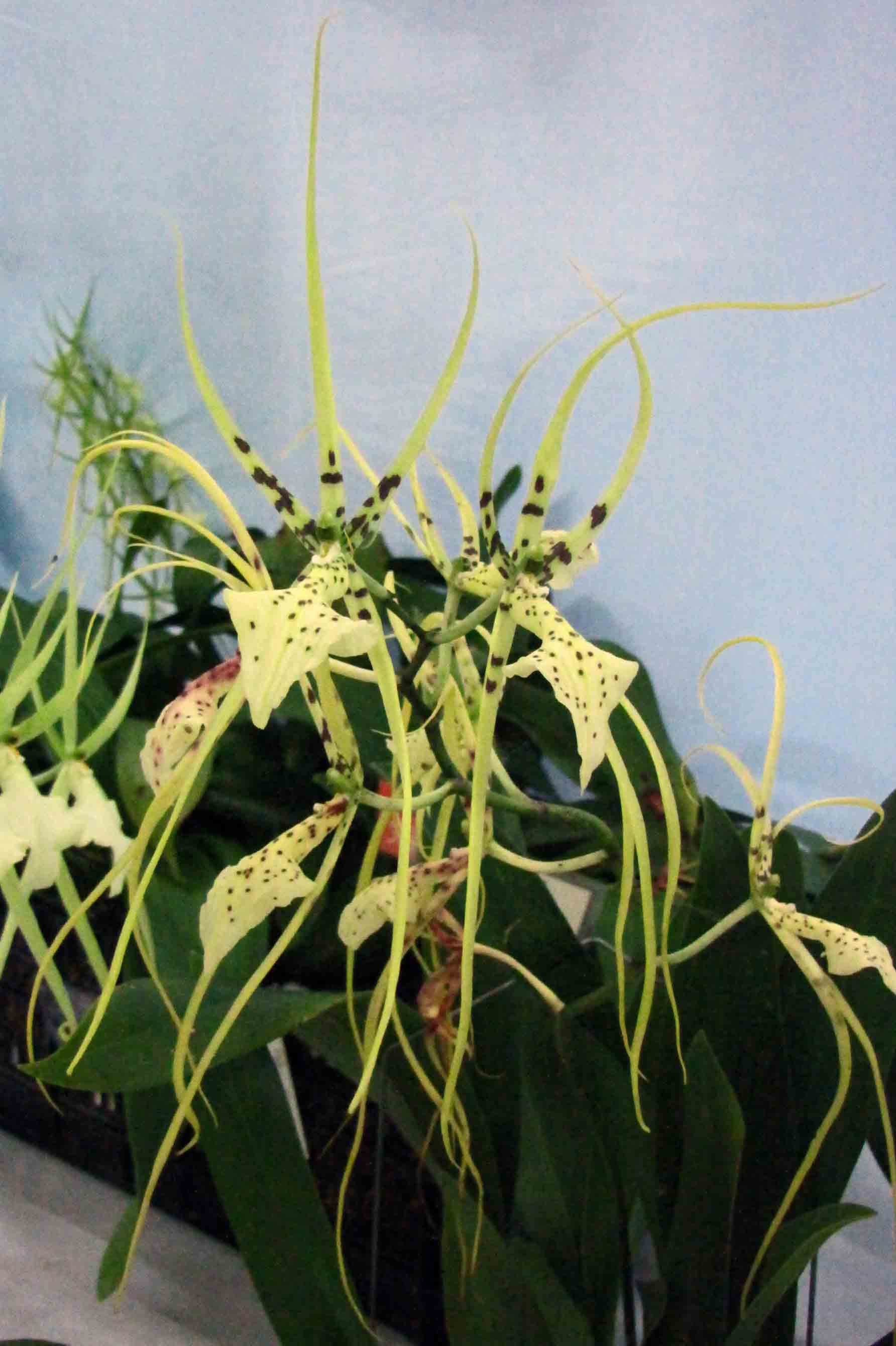
- Brassia wageneri

Scientific classification
- Kingdom: Plantae
- Clade: Embryophytes
- Clade: Tracheophytes
- Clade: Angiosperms
- Clade: Monocots
- Order: Asparagales
- Family: Orchidaceae
- Subfamily: Epidendroideae
- Genus: Brassia
- Species: B. wageneri

Binomial name
- Brassia wageneri Rchb.f.

= Brassia wageneri =

Species of plant

Brassia wageneri is a species in the family Orchidaceae. It is assessed as least concern by the IUCN Red List of Conservation. Brassia wageneri is found in South America's sub-tropical realms and primarily grows 4-6 inch flowers.
