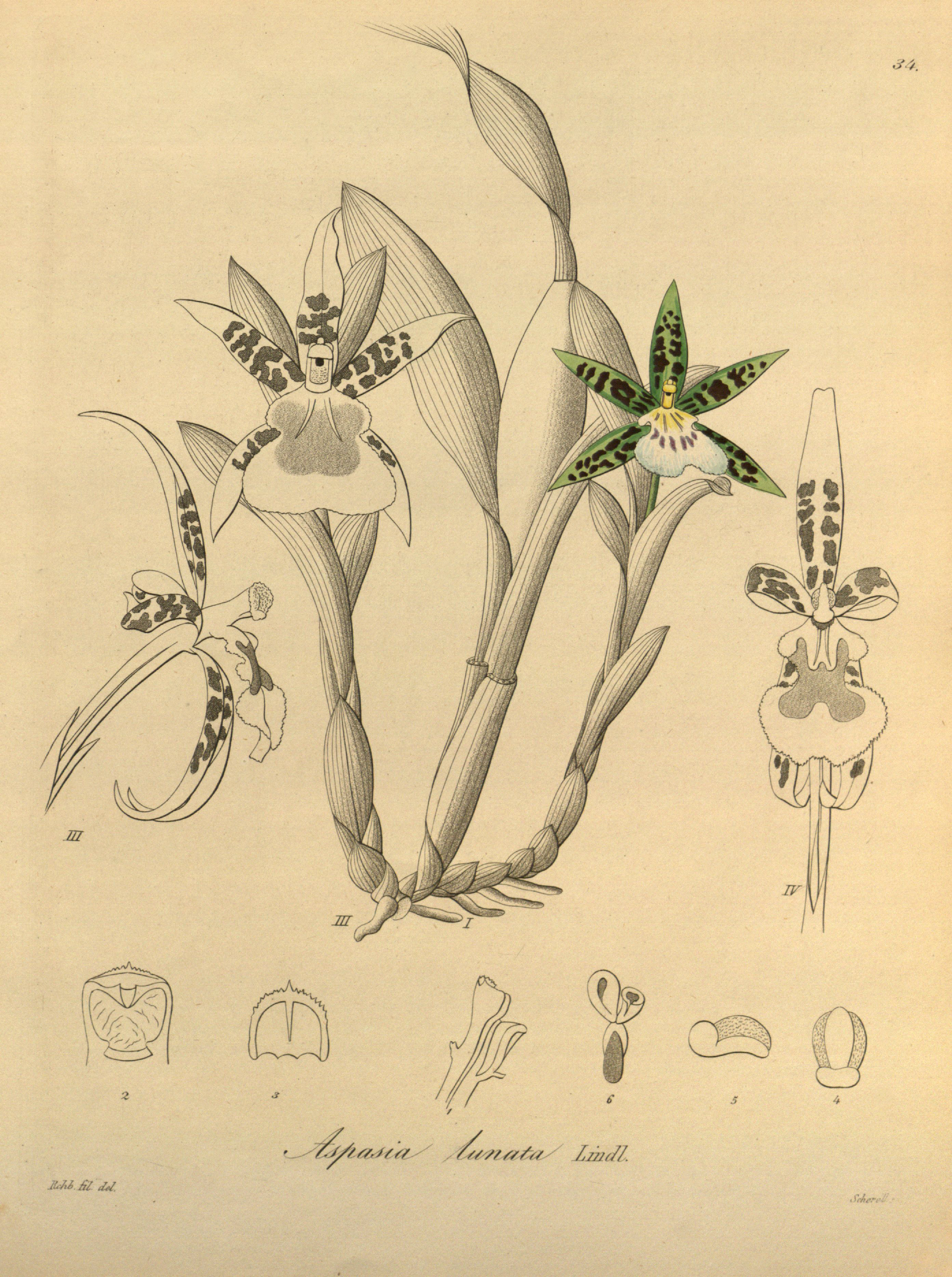

Scientific classification
- Kingdom: Plantae
- Clade: Tracheophytes
- Clade: Angiosperms
- Clade: Monocots
- Order: Asparagales
- Family: Orchidaceae
- Subfamily: Epidendroideae
- Genus: Aspasia
- Species: A. lunata

Binomial name
- Aspasia lunata Lindl. (1836)

Synonyms
- Trophianthus zonatus Scheidw. (1844); Miltonia odorata Rchb.f. (1855); Odontoglossum lunatum (Lindl.) Rchb.f. (1864); Aspasia papilionacea Rchb.f. (1876); Aspasia lunata var. superba B.S.Williams (1894)

= Aspasia lunata =

Species of orchid

Aspasia lunata is a species of orchid, native to tropical South America, in the Brazilian southeast and south and reaching Bolivia and Paraguay, from 200–750 metres (660–2,460 ft) in elevation.

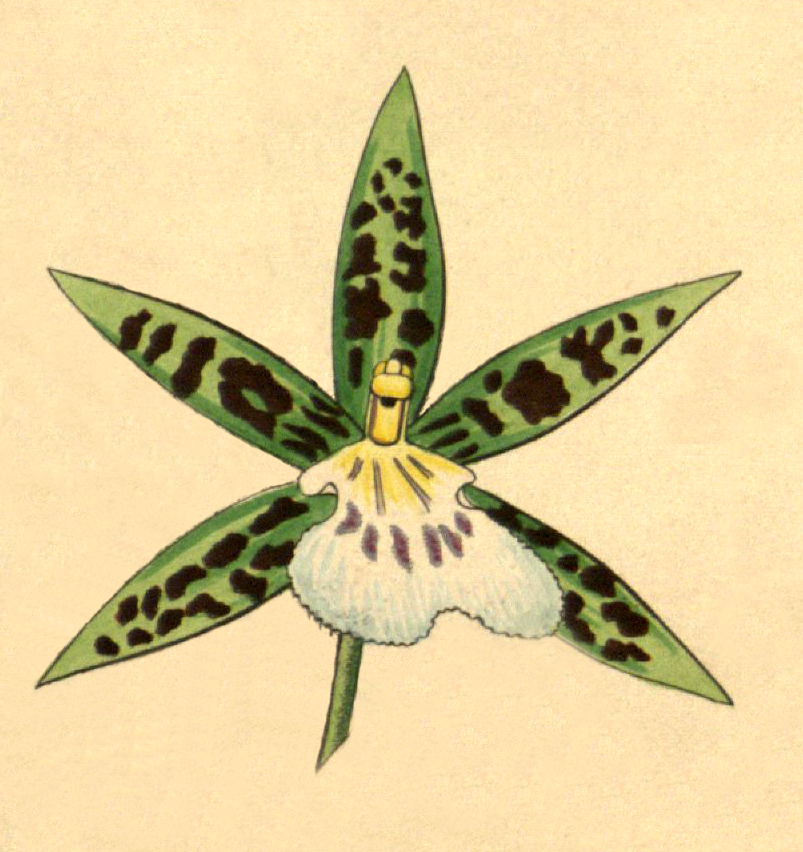
Aspasia lunata - flower

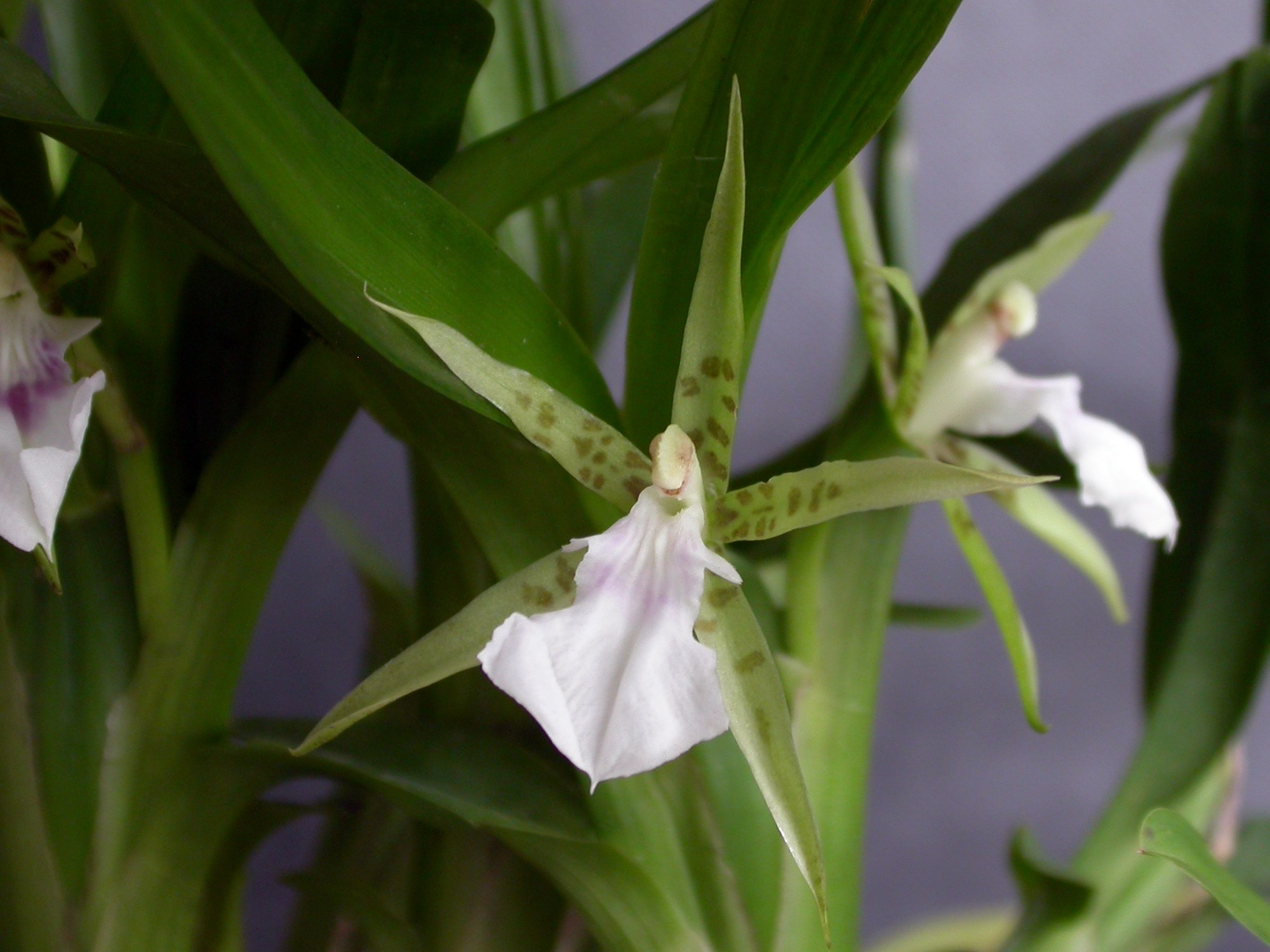
Aspasia lunata - flower and foliage

== Description ==
It forms large colonies, however, being not a particularly common species, it is just occasionally found, mostly on areas of transition between shady forest and open areas both in rain forests and cloud montane forests.

Aspasia lunata is primarily an epiphyte on thick stems but often is found living over rock grooves covered by fallen leaves and humid forests where they never are exposed to direct-straight sunlight.
