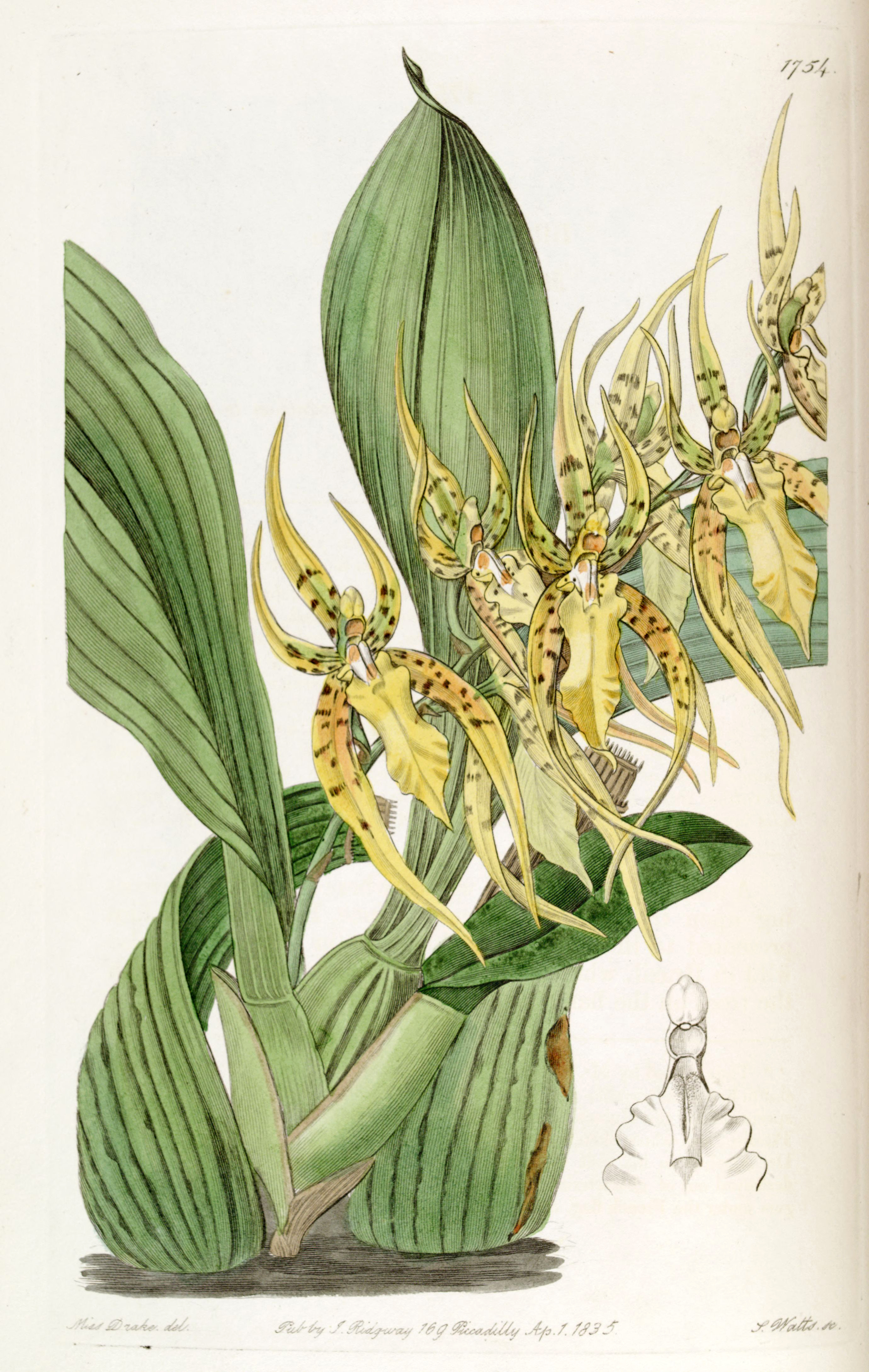
- 1836 illustration Edwards's Botanical Register

Scientific classification
- Kingdom: Plantae
- Clade: Tracheophytes
- Clade: Angiosperms
- Clade: Monocots
- Order: Asparagales
- Family: Orchidaceae
- Subfamily: Epidendroideae
- Genus: Brassia
- Species: B. lanceana

Binomial name
- Brassia lanceana Lindl. (1835)

Synonyms
- Oncidium suaveolens Rchb.f. (1863); Brassia lanceana var. minor Schltr. (1925); Brassia josstiana Rchb.f. in E.A.von Regel (1854); Oncidium josstianum (Rchb.f.) Rchb.f. in W.G.Walpers (1864)

= Brassia lanceana =

Lance's brassia

Species of orchid

Brassia lanceana, or Lance's brassia, is a species of orchid. It is native to Trinidad and Tobago, Venezuela, Guyana, Suriname, French Guiana, Colombia, Panama, Ecuador, Peru and northern Brazil.
