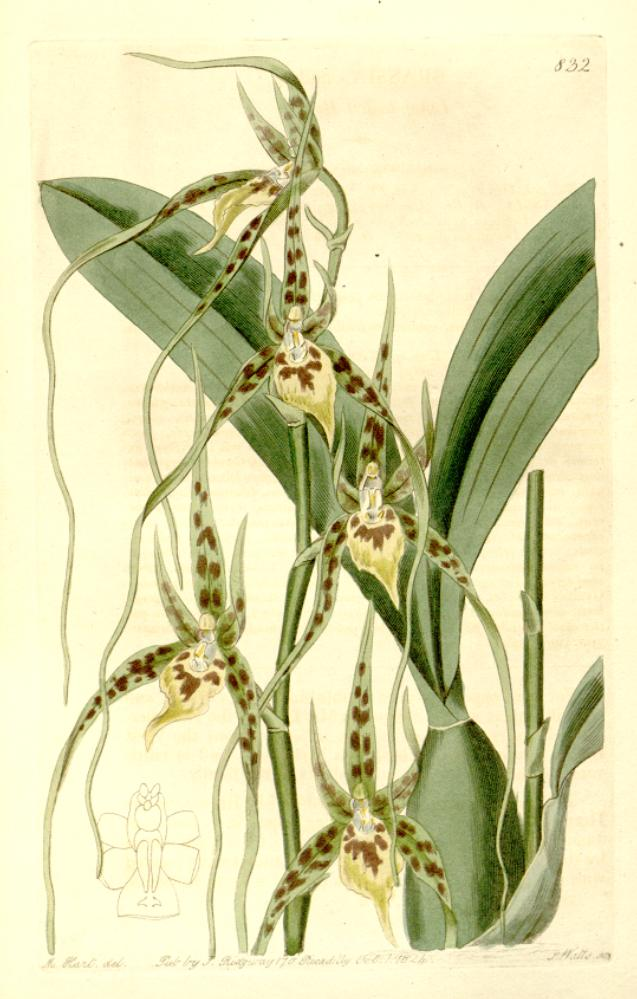
- 1824 illustration from Botanical Register

Scientific classification
- Kingdom: Plantae
- Clade: Tracheophytes
- Clade: Angiosperms
- Clade: Monocots
- Order: Asparagales
- Family: Orchidaceae
- Subfamily: Epidendroideae
- Genus: Brassia
- Species: B. caudata

Binomial name
- Brassia caudata (L.) Lindl. (1825)

Synonyms
- Epidendrum caudatum L. (1759) (basionym); Malaxis caudata (L.) Willd. (1805); Oncidium caudatum (L.) Rchb.f. (1863); Brassia caudata var. hieroglyptica Rchb.f. (1881); Brassia lewisii Rolfe (1893); Brassia longissima var. minor Schltr. (1922)

= Brassia caudata =

Species of flowering plant in the orchid family

Brassia caudata is a species of orchid. It is native to the warmer regions of the Western Hemisphere, reported from southern Mexico (Chiapas, Campeche, Quintana Roo, Tabasco, and Veracruz), Central America, southern Florida, the Greater Antilles, Trinidad, and northern South America. It is commonly known as the tailed Brassia, spider orchid, or cricket orchid.
