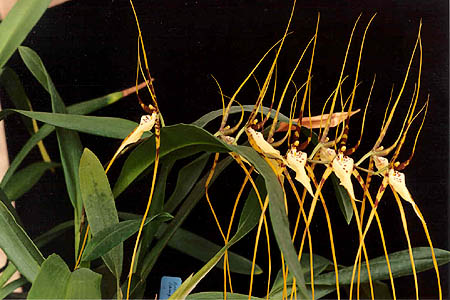

Scientific classification
- Kingdom: Plantae
- Clade: Tracheophytes
- Clade: Angiosperms
- Clade: Monocots
- Order: Asparagales
- Family: Orchidaceae
- Subfamily: Epidendroideae
- Genus: Brassia
- Species: B. arcuigera

Binomial name
- Brassia arcuigera Rchb.f. (1869)

Synonyms
- Brassia lawrenceana var. longissima Rchb.f. (1869); Brassia hinksoniana H.G. Jones (1974); Brassia longissima (Rchb.f.) Nash (1914); Brassia antherotes Rchb.f. (1879); Brassia antherotes var. longissima (Rchb.f.) Teusch.(1961)

= Brassia arcuigera =

Arching Brassia

Species of orchid

Brassia arcuigera, the arching brassia, is a species of orchid (family Orchidaceae). It is native to Honduras, Costa Rica, Panama, Colombia, Venezuela, Ecuador, and Peru. The subspecies B. a. longissima is most notable for its very large flowers; as much as 21 inches (53 centimeters) wide "tip to tip".
