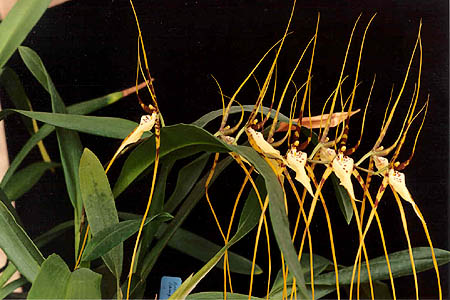
- Brassia arcuigera

Scientific classification
- Kingdom: Plantae
- Clade: Embryophytes
- Clade: Tracheophytes
- Clade: Spermatophytes
- Clade: Angiosperms
- Clade: Monocots
- Order: Asparagales
- Family: Orchidaceae
- Subfamily: Epidendroideae
- Tribe: Cymbidieae
- Subtribe: Oncidiinae
- Genus: Brassia; R.Br.

Type species
- Brassia maculata R.Br.

Synonyms
- Ada Lindl.; Brachtia Rchb.f.; Brassiopsis Szlach. & Górniak; Mesospinidium Rchb.f.; Oncodia Lindl.

= Brassia =

Spider orchid

Genus of orchids

Brassia is a genus of orchids classified in the subtribe Oncidiinae. It is native to Mexico, Central America, the West Indies, and northern South America, with one species (B. caudata) extending into Florida.

The genus was named after William Brass, a British botanist and illustrator, who collected plants in Africa under the supervision of Sir Joseph Banks. Its abbreviation in the horticultural trade is Brs.

== Description ==
Brassia species and its popular hybrids are common in cultivation, and are notable for the characteristic long and spreading tepals (in some clones longer than 50 cm), which lend them the common name spider orchid.

This epiphytic genus occurs in wet forests from sea level to altitudes under 1500 m, with the Peruvian Andes as its center of diversity. Occurrence is mostly restricted to a certain area, but Brassia caudata can be found over the whole geographic area.

They have large elliptic-oblong pseudobulbs with one or two leaves at the apex, lateral, unbranched many-flowered inflorescences with small floral bracts. The lip is not attached to the column. The pollinarium shows a narrow stipe. There are two distichous, foliaceous sheaths around the base, from which the inflorescence emerges.

Brassia has a very specific method for pollination; it uses entomophily - pollination by insects - and in this case specifically by female spider-hunter wasps of the genera Pepsis and Campsomeris. Mistaken by the mimicry of Brassia, the wasp stings the lip, while trying to grasp its prey without any success. By these movements the wasp comes into contact with the pollinarium, that then sticks to its head. By flying to another Brassia flower, this flower gets pollinated.

== List of species ==
As of August 2023, Plants of the World Online accepted the following species:

- Brassia allenii L.O.Williams ex C.Schweinf. – Honduras, Panama
- Brassia andina (Rchb.f.) M.W.Chase – Colombia, Ecuador, Peru
- Brassia andreettae (Dodson) Senghas – Ecuador
- Brassia angusta Lindl. – Venezuela, Guyana, northern Brazil
- Brassia angustilabia Schltr. – Panama, Brazil (Amazonas)
- Brassia arachnoidea Barb.Rodr. – Rio de Janeiro
- Brassia arcuigera Rchb.f. – Honduras, Costa Rica, Panama, Colombia, Venezuela, Ecuador, Peru
- Brassia aurantiaca (Lindl.) M.W.Chase – Colombia, Venezuela, Ecuador
- Brassia aurorae D.E.Benn. – Peru
- Brassia bennettiorum (Dodson) Senghas – Peru
- Brassia bidens Lindl. – Venezuela, Guyana, northern Brazil
- Brassia bowmanni (Rchb.f.) M.W.Chase – Colombia
- Brassia brachypus Rchb.f. – Ecuador, Peru, Bolivia
- Brassia brevis (Kraenzl.) M.W.Chase – Colombia, Ecuador
- Brassia brunnea Archila – Guatemala
- Brassia caudata (L.) Lindl. – Mexico, Central America, Florida, Greater Antilles, Trinidad, northern South America
- Brassia cauliformis C.Schweinf. – Peru
- Brassia chloroleuca Barb.Rodr. – Guyana, French Guiana, Brazil
- Brassia chlorops Endrés & Rchb.f. – Nicaragua, Costa Rica, Panama
- Brassia cochlearis (H.R.Sweet) M.W.Chase
- Brassia cochleata Knowles & Westc. – northern South America
- Brassia cyrtopetala Schltr. – Colombia
- Brassia diphylla (H.R.Sweet) M.W.Chase – Colombia
- Brassia dresslerorum Archila – Guatemala
- Brassia ecuadorensis (Garay) M.W.Chase – Ecuador
- Brassia endresii (Kraenzl.) ined. – Central America
- Brassia escobariana Garay – Colombia
- Brassia euodes Rchb.f. – Colombia, Ecuador, Peru
- Brassia farinifera Linden & Rchb.f. – Ecuador
- Brassia filomenoi Schltr. – Peru
- Brassia forgetiana Sander – Peru, Brazil, Venezuela
- Brassia garayana M.W.Chase – Ecuador, Peru
- Brassia gireoudiana Rchb.f. & Warsz. – Costa Rica, Panama
- Brassia glumacea Lindl. – Colombia, Venezuela, Ecuador, Peru
- Brassia glumaceoides M.W.Chase – Colombia, Venezuela
- Brassia horichii (I.Bock) M.W.Chase – Costa Rica, Panama
- Brassia huebneri Schltr. – French Guiana, Brazil
- Brassia iguapoana Schltr. – Brazil (Amazonas)
- Brassia incantans (Rchb.f.) M.W.Chase – Colombia, Ecuador, Peru
- Brassia jipijapensis Dodson & N.H.Williams – Ecuador (Manabí)
- Brassia keiliana Rchb.f. ex Lindl. – Colombia, Venezuela, Guyana
- Brassia koehlerorum Schltr. – Peru
- Brassia lanceana Lindl. – Panama, Trinidad & Tobago, northern South America
- Brassia lehmannii (Garay) M.W.Chase
- Brassia macrostachya Lindl. – Venezuela, Guyana
- Brassia maculata R.Br. – Mexico, Central America, Cuba, Jamaica
- Brassia mendozae (Dodson) Senghas – Ecuador
- Brassia minutiflora (Kraenzl.) M.W.Chase – Colombia
- Brassia neglecta Rchb.f. – Guyana, Venezuela, Bolivia, Colombia, Ecuador, Peru
- Brassia ocanensis Lindl. – Venezuela, Bolivia, Colombia, Ecuador, Peru
- Brassia panamensis (Garay) M.W.Chase – Panama
- Brassia pascoensis D.E.Benn. & Christenson – Peru
- Brassia peruviana Poepp. & Endl. – Peru
- Brassia pozoi (Dodson & N.H.Williams) Senghas – Ecuador, Peru
- Brassia pumila Lindl. – Guyana, Venezuela, French Guiana, Colombia, Peru, Brazil
- Brassia revoluta Č.Florián
- Brassia rhizomatosa Garay & Dunst. – Venezuela, Peru
- Brassia rolandoi (D.E.Benn. & Christenson) M.W.Chase – Peru
- Brassia signata Rchb.f. – Peru, Bolivia, Oaxaca, Guerrero
- Brassia suavissima Pupulin & Bogarín – Costa Rica
- Brassia sulphurea (Rchb.f.) M.W.Chase – Venezuela
- Brassia thyrsodes Rchb.f. – Bolivia
- Brassia transamazonica D.E.Benn. & Christenson – Peru
- Brassia verrucosa Bateman ex Lindl. – Mexico, Central America, Venezuela, Brazil
- Brassia villosa Lindl. – Guyana, Venezuela, Brazil
- Brassia wageneri Rchb.f. – Guyana, Venezuela, Brazil, Colombia, Peru
- Brassia warszewiczii Rchb.f. – Ecuador
- Brassia whewellii J.M.H.Shaw
- Brassia wyllisiana K.G.Lacerda & V.P.Castro

== Intergeneric hybrids ==
- × Aliceara (Brassia × Miltonia × Oncidium)
- × Bakerara (Brassia × Miltonia × Odontoglossum × Oncidium)
- × Banfieldara (Ada × Brassia × Odontoglossum )
- × Brapasia (Aspasia × Brassia)
- × Brassada (Ada × Brassia)
- × Brassidium (Brassia × Oncidium)
- × Brassochilus (Brassia × Leochilus)
- × Bratonia (Brassia × Miltonia)
- × Crawshayara (Aspasia × Brassia × Miltonia × Oncidium)
- × Degarmoara (Brassia × Miltonia × Odontoglossum )
- × Derosaara (Aspasia × Brassia × Miltonia × Odontoglossum )
- × Duggerara (Ada × Brassia × Miltonia)
- × Eliara (Brassia × Oncidium × Rodriguezia)
- × Forgetara (Aspasia × Brassia × Miltonia)
- × Johnkellyara (Brassia × Leochilus × Oncidium × Rodriguezia)
- × Norwoodara (Brassia × Miltonia × Oncidium × Rodriguezia)
- × Pettitara (Ada × Brassia × Oncidium)
- × Rodrassia (Brassia × Rodriguezia)
- × Rohriara (Ada × Aspasia × Brassia)
- × Sauledaara (Aspasia × Brassia × Miltonia × Oncidium × Rodriguezia)
- × Shiveara (Aspasia × Brassia × Odontoglossum × Oncidium)
- × Wingfieldara (Aspasia × Brassia × Odontoglossum)

This list does not include nothogenera based on genera that are synonyms of Oncidium, as for instance Cochlioda and Odontoglossum. These nothogenera are now synonyms with other nothogenera in this list, or with Brassia (in the case of Brassioda = Brassia × Cochlioda).

== Gallery ==
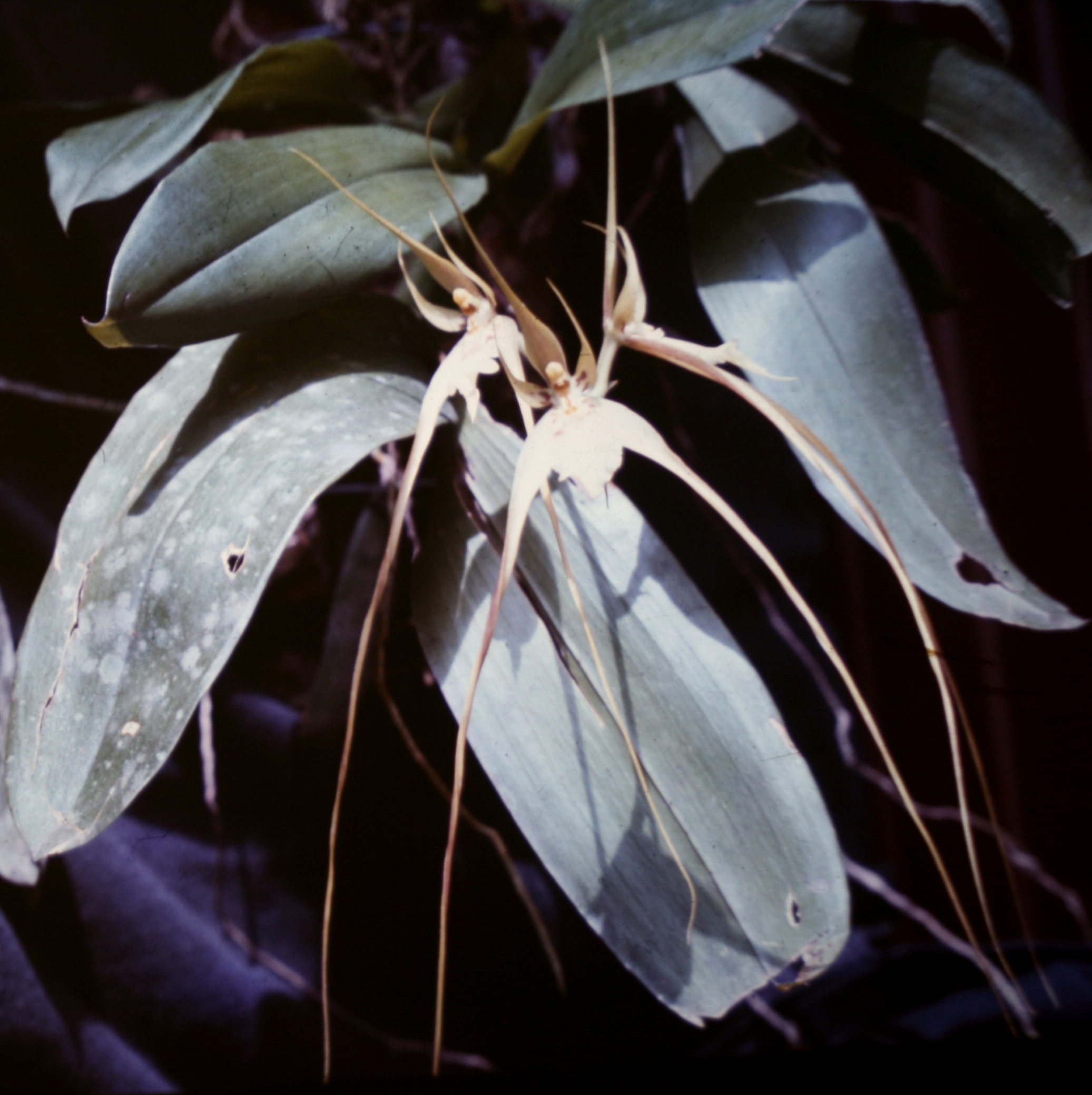
Brassia caudata

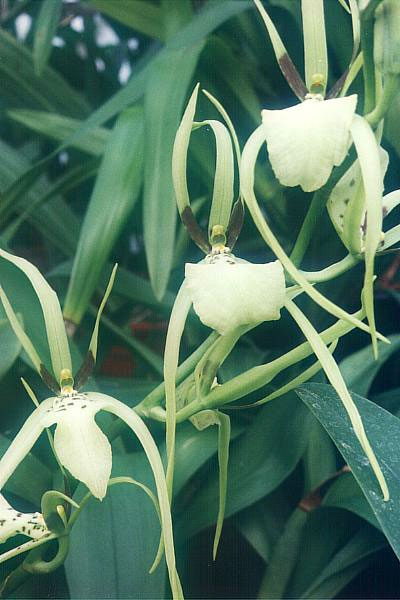
Brassia girouldiana

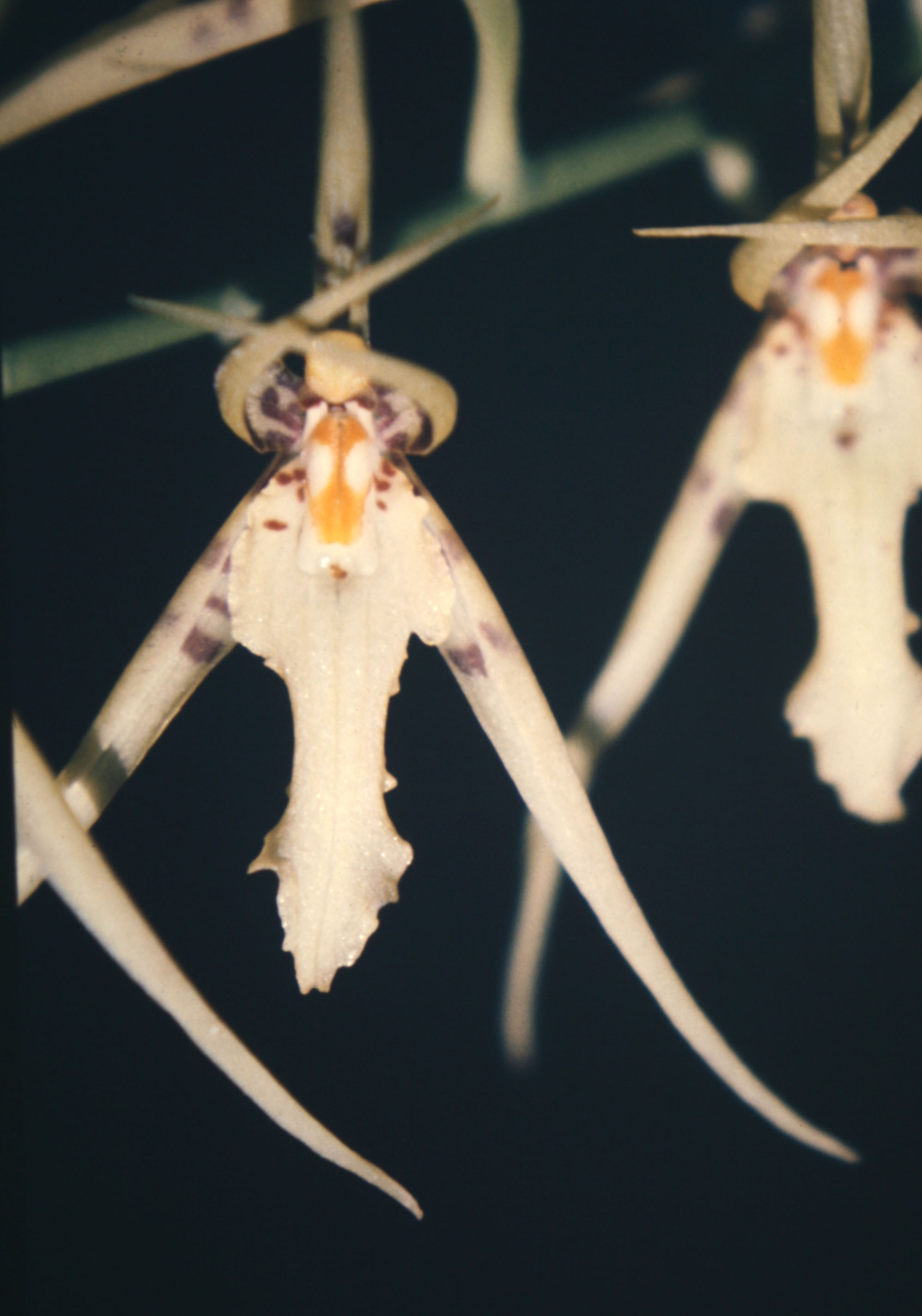
Brassia lanceana

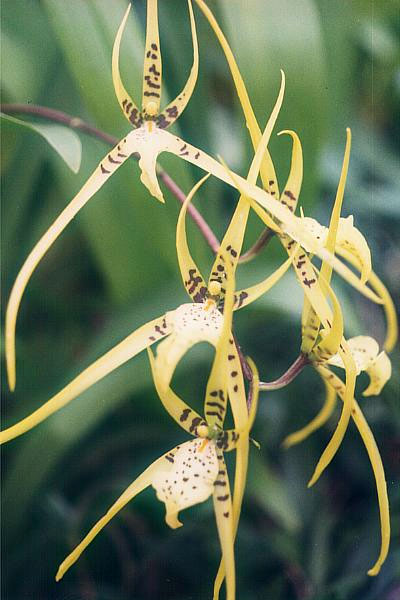
Brassia maculata

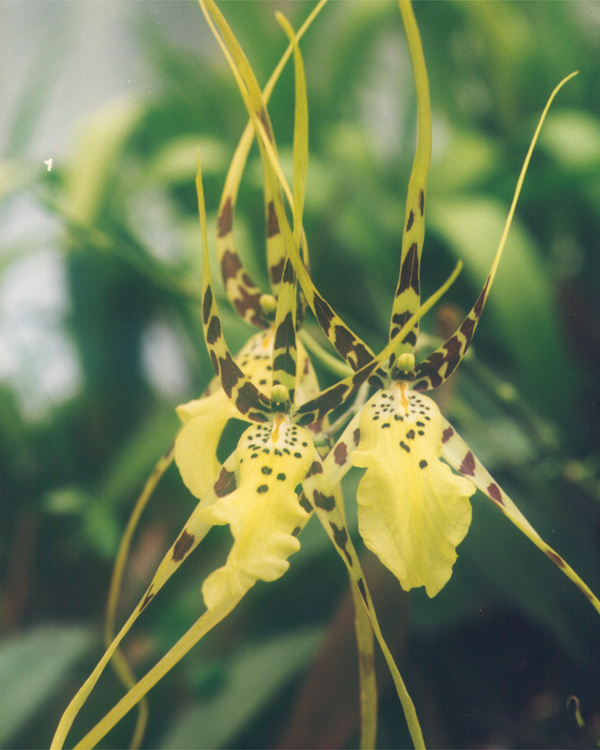
Brassia Rattler = B. maculata × B. arcuigera (syn. B. longissima)
