= Brassia pumila =

Scientific classification
- Kingdom: Plantae
- Clade: Tracheophytes
- Clade: Angiosperms
- Clade: Monocots
- Order: Asparagales
- Family: Orchidaceae
- Subfamily: Epidendroideae
- Genus: Brassia
- Species: B. pumila

Binomial name
- Brassia pumila Lindl.

Synonyms
- Brassia lanceana var. pumila (Lindl.) Lindl; Oncidium suaveolens var. pumilum (Lindl.) Rchb.f. in W.G.Walpers

Species of orchid

Brassia pumila is a species of epiphytic orchid native to Guyana, Venezuela, French Guiana, Colombia, Peru, and Brazil.
