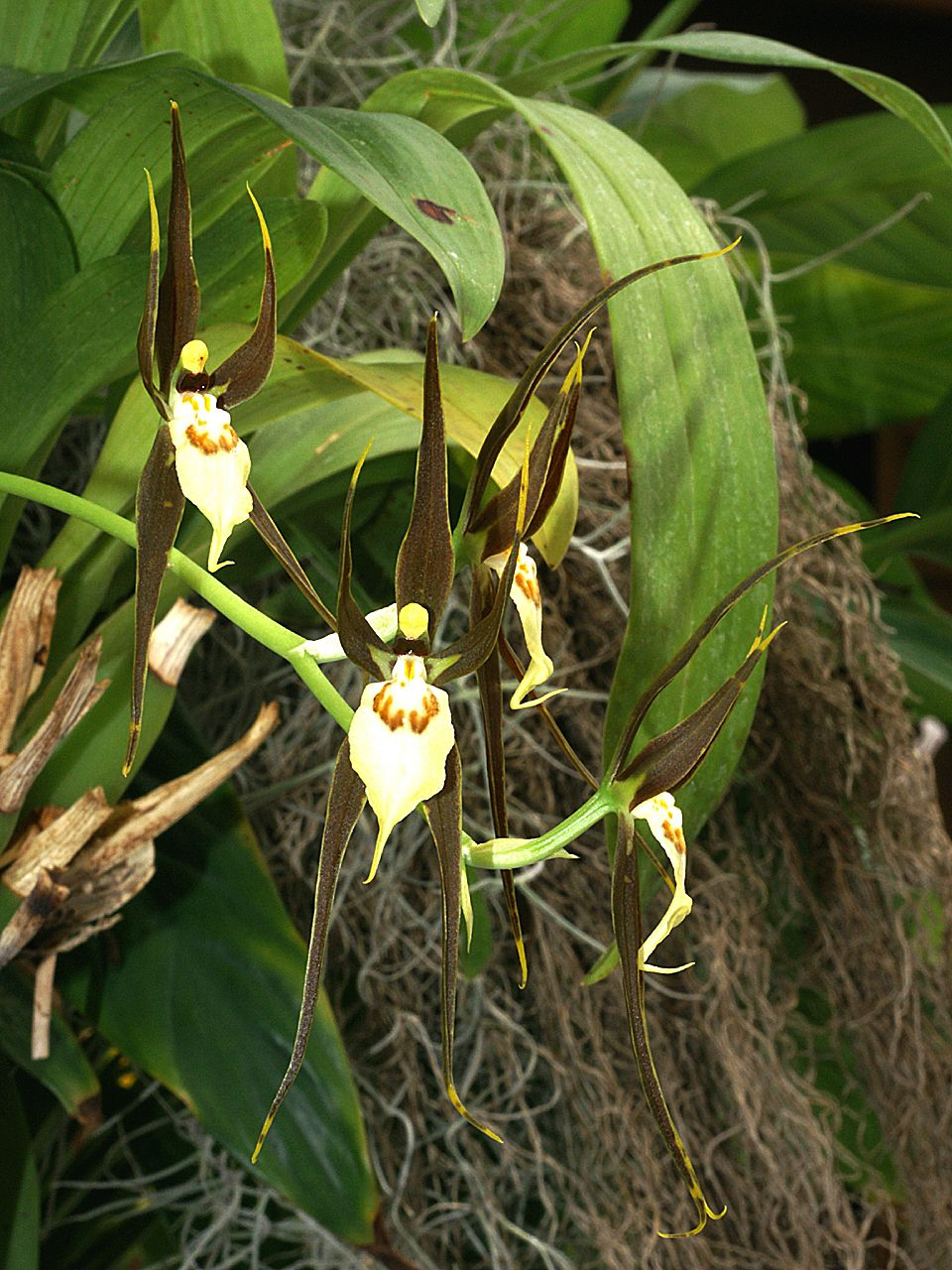

Scientific classification
- Kingdom: Plantae
- Clade: Tracheophytes
- Clade: Angiosperms
- Clade: Monocots
- Order: Asparagales
- Family: Orchidaceae
- Subfamily: Epidendroideae
- Genus: Brassia
- Species: B. keiliana

Binomial name
- Brassia keiliana Rchb.f. ex Lindl. (1852)

Synonyms
- Ada keiliana (Rchb.f. ex Lindl.) N.H. Williams (1972); Oncidium keilianum (Rchb.f. ex Lindl.) Rchb.f. (1863); Brassia cinnamomea Linden ex Lindl. (1854); Brassia havanensis Lindl. (1854); Brassia keiliana var. tristis Rchb.f. (1863); Brassiopsis keiliana (Rchb.f. ex Lindl.) Szlach. & Górniak (2006)

= Brassia keiliana =

Species of orchid

Brassia keiliana is a species of orchid. It is native to Colombia, Venezuela and Guyana.
