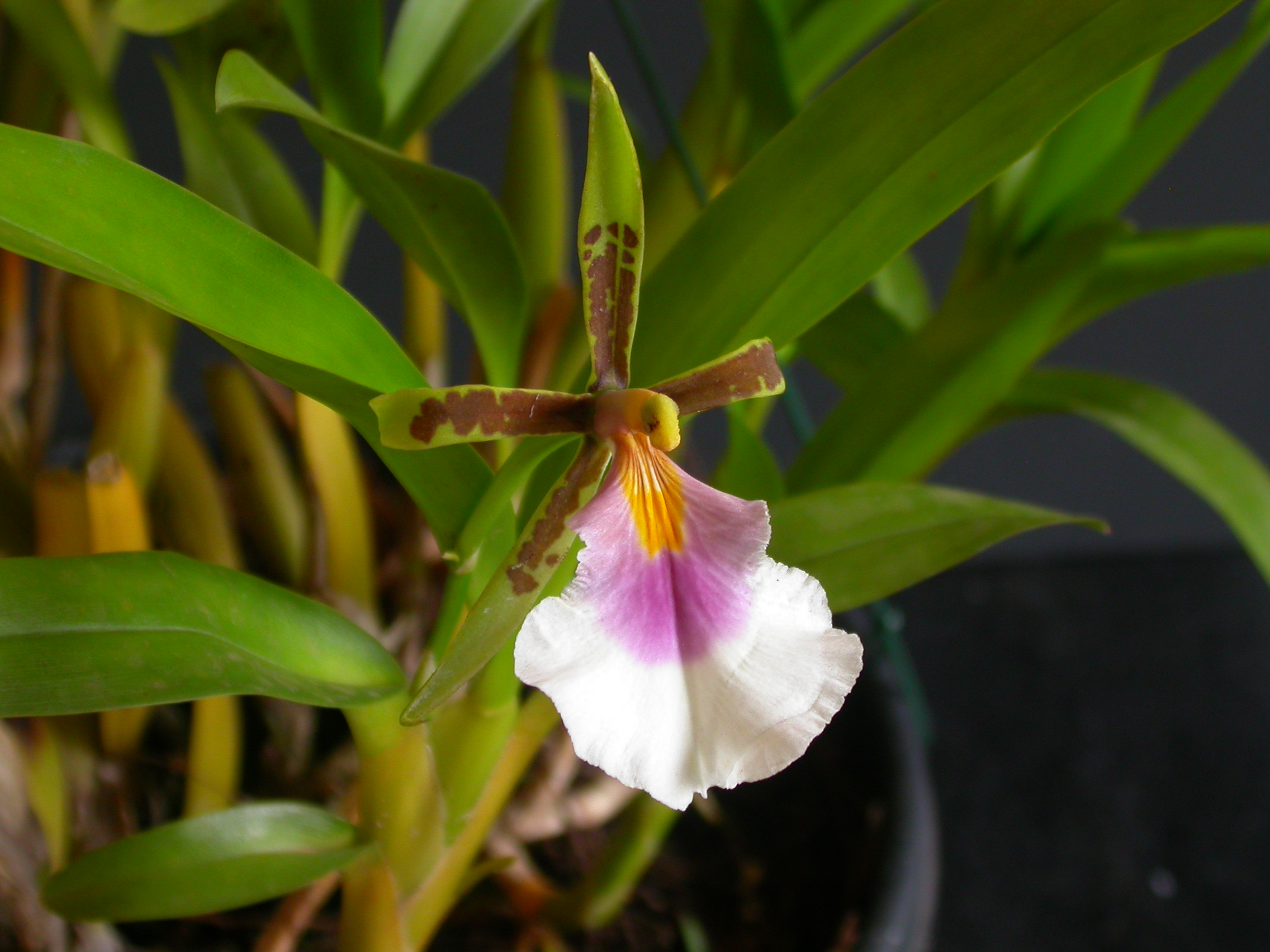

Scientific classification
- Kingdom: Plantae
- Clade: Tracheophytes
- Clade: Angiosperms
- Clade: Monocots
- Order: Asparagales
- Family: Orchidaceae
- Subfamily: Epidendroideae
- Genus: Aspasia
- Species: A. silvana

Binomial name
- Aspasia silvana F. Barros (1988)

= Aspasia silvana =

Species of orchid

Aspasia silvana is a species of orchid, exclusively and endemic in the eastern Brazilian Serra do Mar mountains, from Rio de Janeiro to Bahia. It forms large colonies, however, being not a particularly common species, it is just occasionally found, mostly on areas of transition between shady forest and open areas both in rain forests and cloud montane forests.
