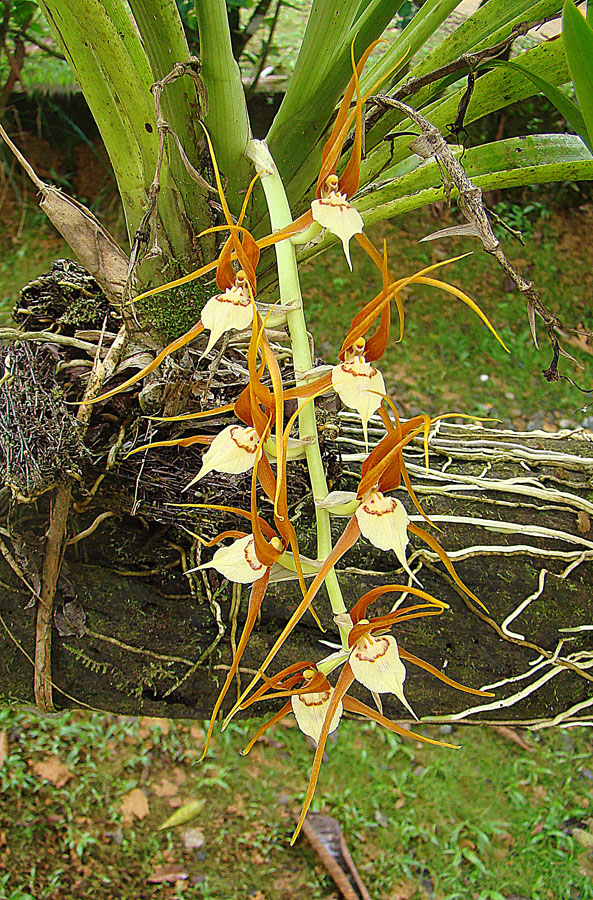

Scientific classification
- Kingdom: Plantae
- Clade: Tracheophytes
- Clade: Angiosperms
- Clade: Monocots
- Order: Asparagales
- Family: Orchidaceae
- Subfamily: Epidendroideae
- Genus: Brassia
- Species: B. allenii

Binomial name
- Brassia allenii L.O.Williams ex C.Schweinf. (1948)

Synonyms
- Brassiopsis allenii (L.O.Williams ex C.Schweinf.) Szlach. & Górniak (2006); Ada allenii (L.O.Williams ex C.Schweinf.) N.H.Williams (1972)

= Brassia allenii =

Species of orchid

Brassia allenii is a species of orchid. It is native to Honduras and Panama.
