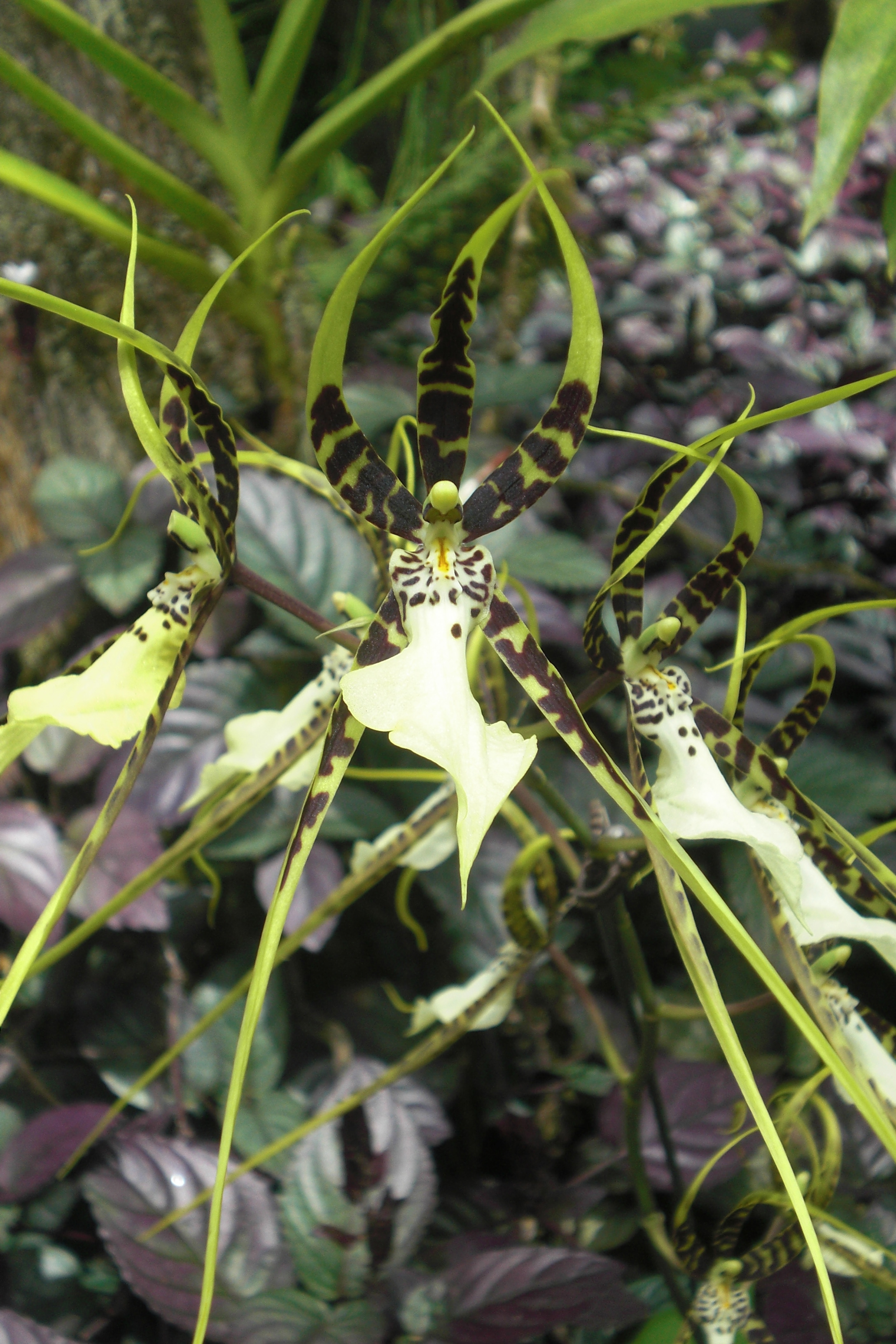

Scientific classification
- Kingdom: Plantae
- Clade: Embryophytes
- Clade: Tracheophytes
- Clade: Spermatophytes
- Clade: Angiosperms
- Clade: Monocots
- Order: Asparagales
- Family: Orchidaceae
- Subfamily: Epidendroideae
- Genus: Brassia
- Species: B. maculata

Binomial name
- Brassia maculata R.Br. in W.T.Aiton (1813)

Synonyms
- Brassia maculata var. guttata (Lindl.) Lindl. (1854); Oncidium brassia Rchb.f. (1863); Brassia guttata Lindl. (1842); Brassia wrayae Skinner ex Hook. (1843)

= Brassia maculata =

Spotted brassia

Species of orchid

Brassia maculata, the spotted brassia, is a species of orchid. It is native to southern Mexico (Chiapas, Veracruz, Tabasco, Guerrero, Oaxaca, Campeche, Quintana Roo), Central America (Belize, Guatemala, El Salvador, Honduras, Nicaragua), Cuba, and Jamaica.
