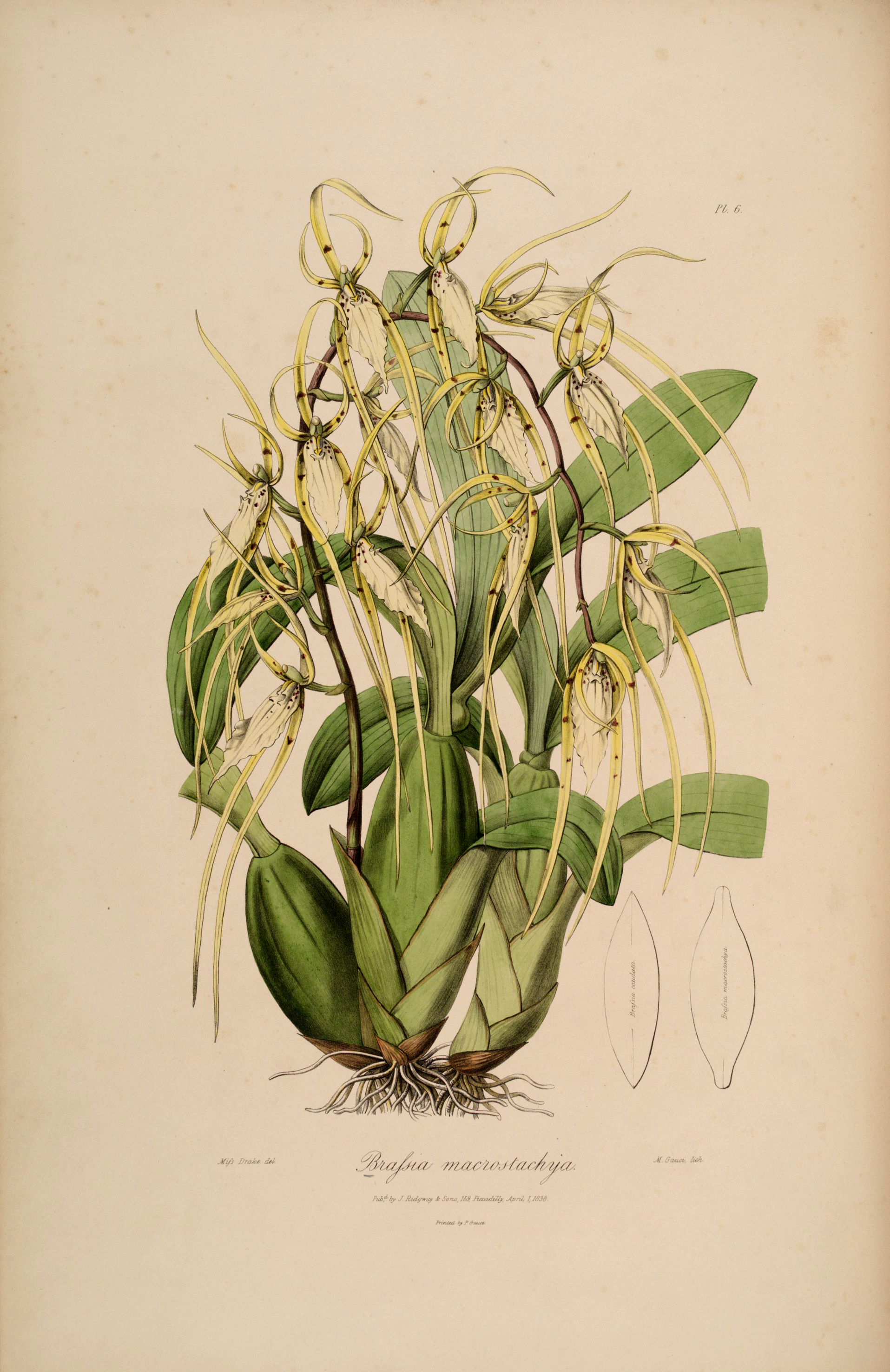
- 1838 illustration Sertum Orchidaceum

Scientific classification
- Kingdom: Plantae
- Clade: Tracheophytes
- Clade: Angiosperms
- Clade: Monocots
- Order: Asparagales
- Family: Orchidaceae
- Subfamily: Epidendroideae
- Genus: Brassia
- Species: B. macrostachya

Binomial name
- Brassia macrostachya Lindl.

Synonyms
- Brassia lanceana var. macrostachya (Lindl.) Lindl.

= Brassia macrostachya =

Species of orchid

Brassia macrostachya is a species of orchid native to Venezuela and Guyana.

The plant is listed is "vulnerable" according to the Venezuelan "Red Book".
