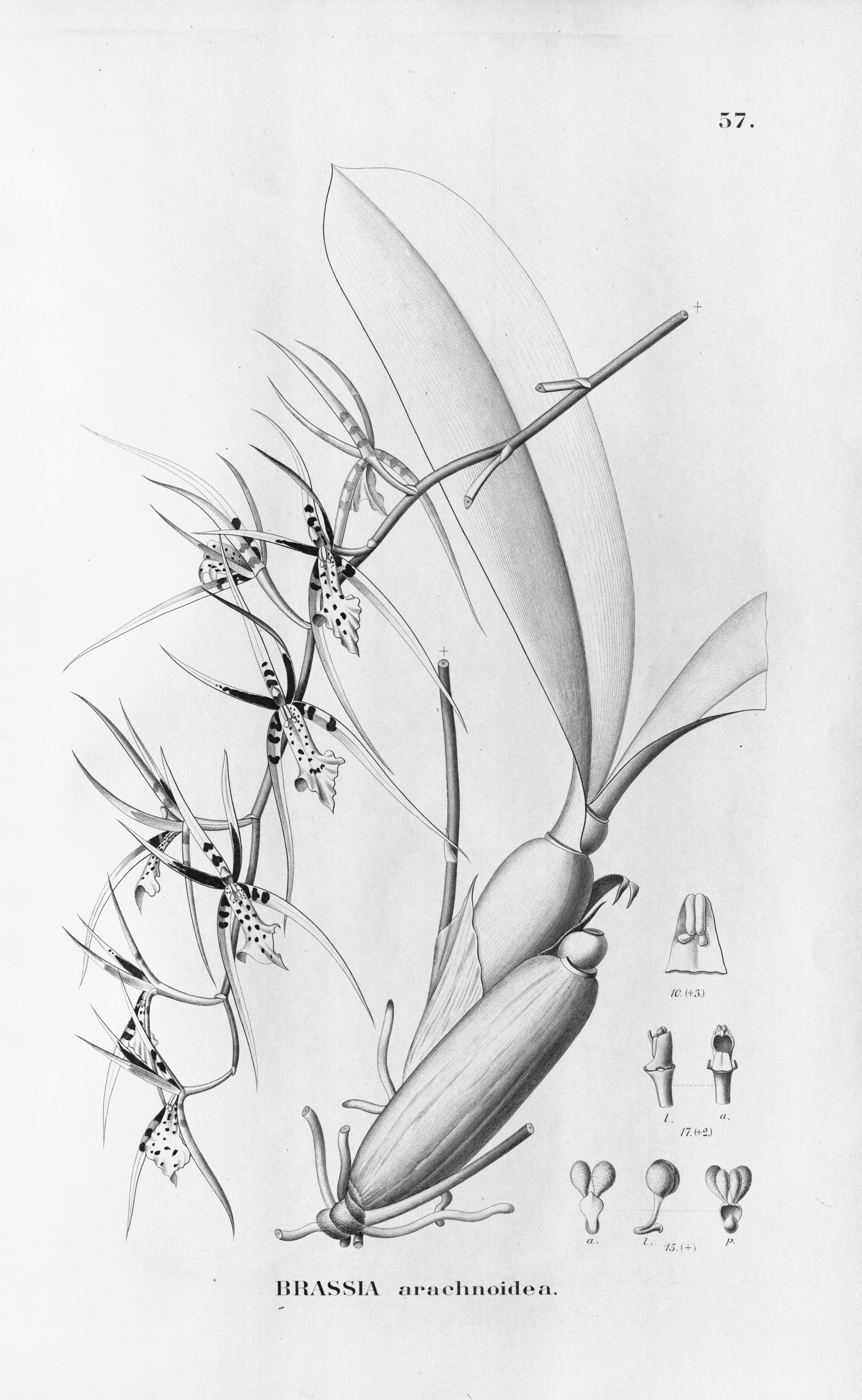
- 1905 illustration by von Martius, Eichler, Urban; Flora Brasiliensis
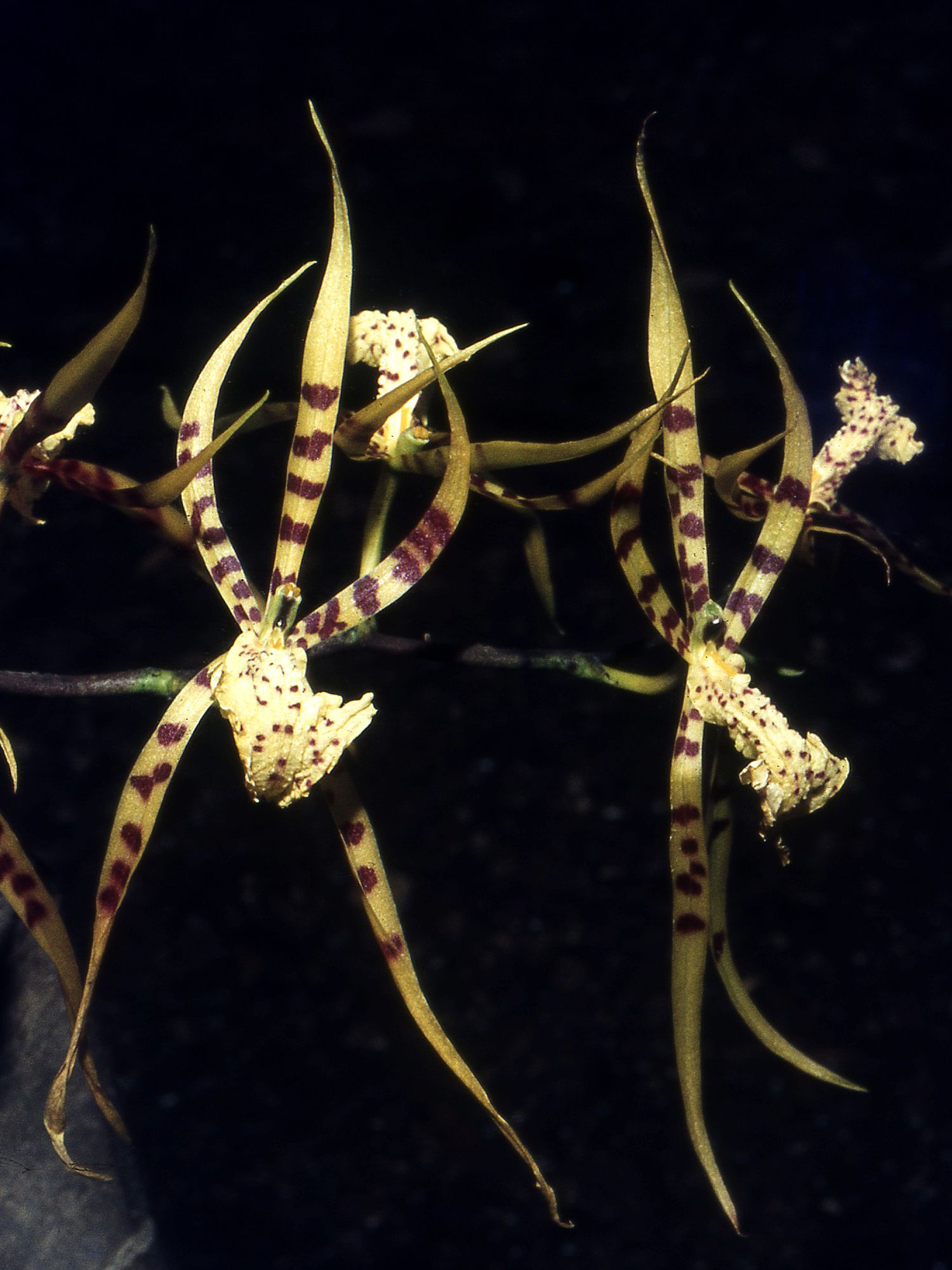

Scientific classification
- Kingdom: Plantae
- Clade: Tracheophytes
- Clade: Angiosperms
- Clade: Monocots
- Order: Asparagales
- Family: Orchidaceae
- Subfamily: Epidendroideae
- Genus: Brassia
- Species: B. arachnoidea

Binomial name
- Brassia arachnoidea Barb.Rodr. (1877)

= Brassia arachnoidea =

Species of orchid

Brassia arachnoidea is a species of orchid. It is endemic to the Rio de Janeiro region of Brazil.
