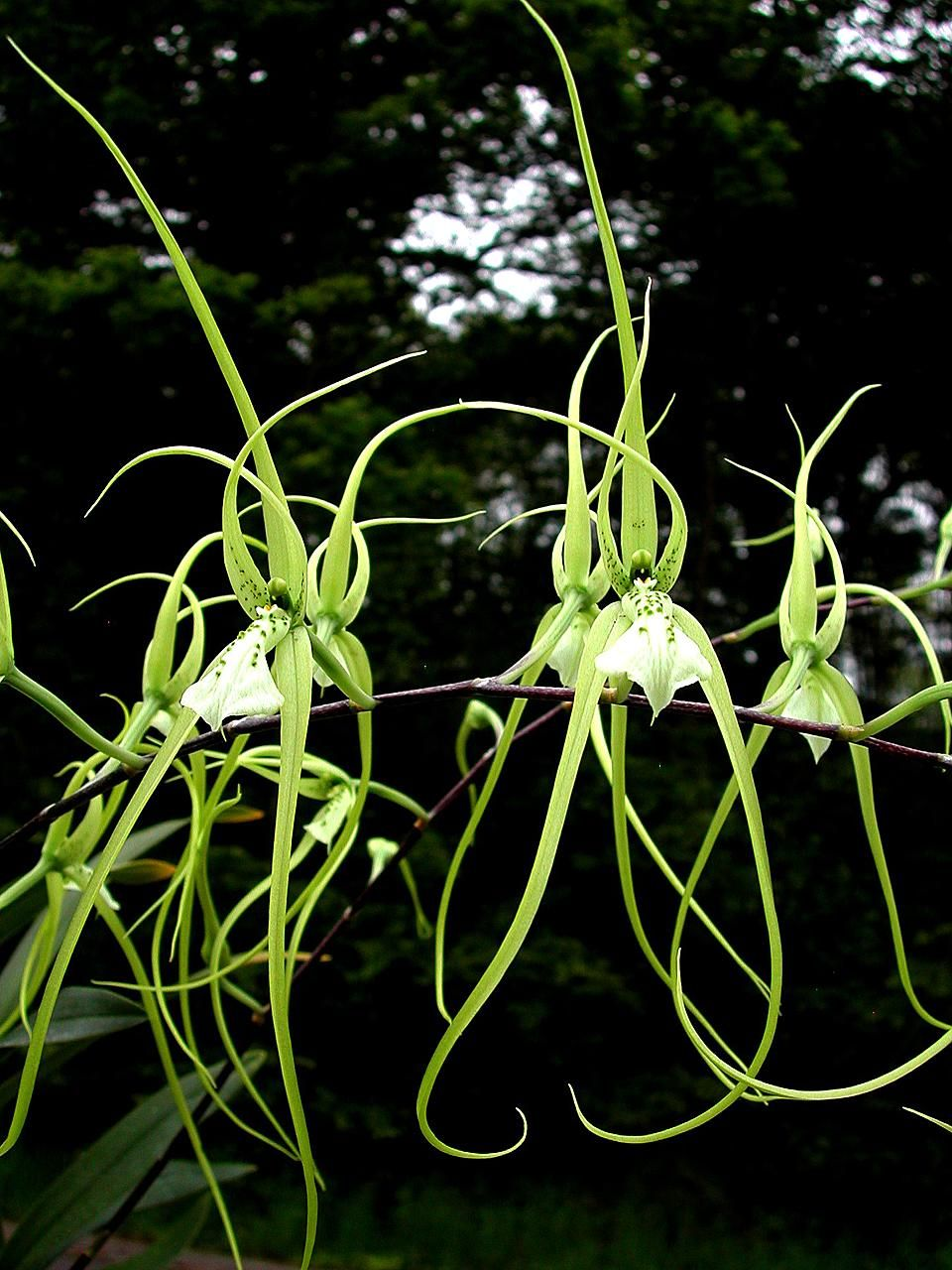

Scientific classification
- Kingdom: Plantae
- Clade: Tracheophytes
- Clade: Angiosperms
- Clade: Monocots
- Order: Asparagales
- Family: Orchidaceae
- Subfamily: Epidendroideae
- Genus: Brassia
- Species: B. verrucosa

Binomial name
- Brassia verrucosa Bateman ex Lindl. (1840)

Synonyms
- Oncidium verrucosum (Bateman ex Lindl.) Rchb. f. (1863); Brassia brachiata Lindl. (1842); Brassia aristata Lindl. (1844); Brassia odontoglossoides Klotzsch & H. Karst. (1847); Brassia coryandra E. Morren (1848); Brassia longiloba DC. (1848); Brassia cowanii Lindl. (1854); Oncidium brachiatum (Lindl.) Rchb. f. (1863)

= Brassia verrucosa =

Warty brassia

Species of orchid

Brassia verrucosa, also known as warty brassia, is a species of plant in the family Orchidaceae native to Mexico, Central America (Costa Rica, El Salvador, Guatemala, Honduras, Nicaragua), Venezuela, and Brazil. It has very thin but very long sepals and petals, each of which can be up to 15 cm (5.9 in) length.
