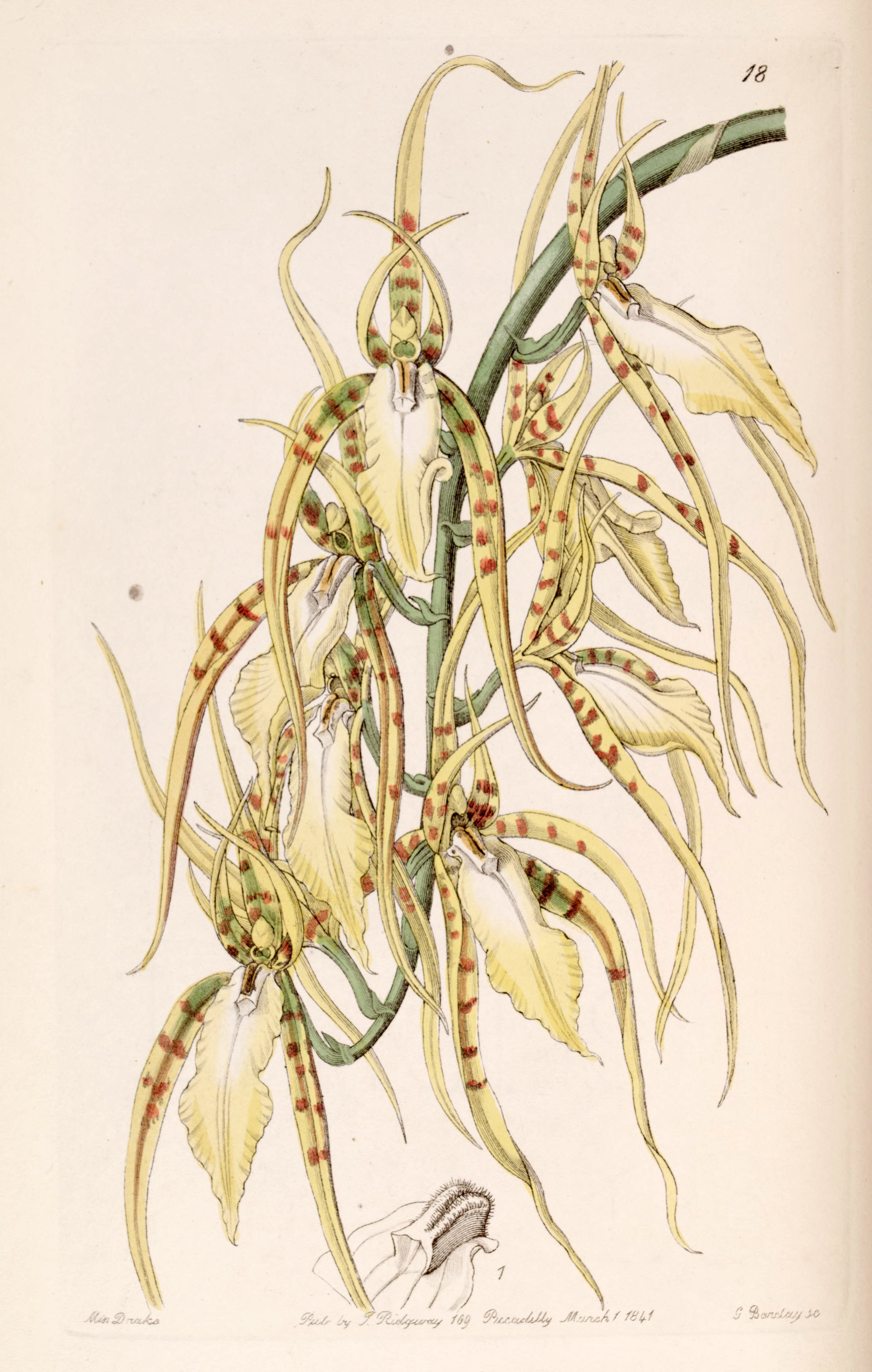
- 1841 illustration Edwards's Botanical Register as Brassia lawrenceana

Scientific classification
- Kingdom: Plantae
- Clade: Tracheophytes
- Clade: Angiosperms
- Clade: Monocots
- Order: Asparagales
- Family: Orchidaceae
- Subfamily: Epidendroideae
- Genus: Brassia
- Species: B. cochleata

Binomial name
- Brassia cochleata Knowles & Westc. (1838)

Synonyms
- Brassia lawrenceana Lindl. (1841); Oncidium lawrenceanum (Lindl.) Rchb.f. (1863)

= Brassia cochleata =

Species of orchid

Brassia cochleata is an epiphytic species of orchid. it is native to northern South America (French Guinea, Guyana, Suriname, Venezuela, Colombia, Ecuador, Peru, northern Brazil).
