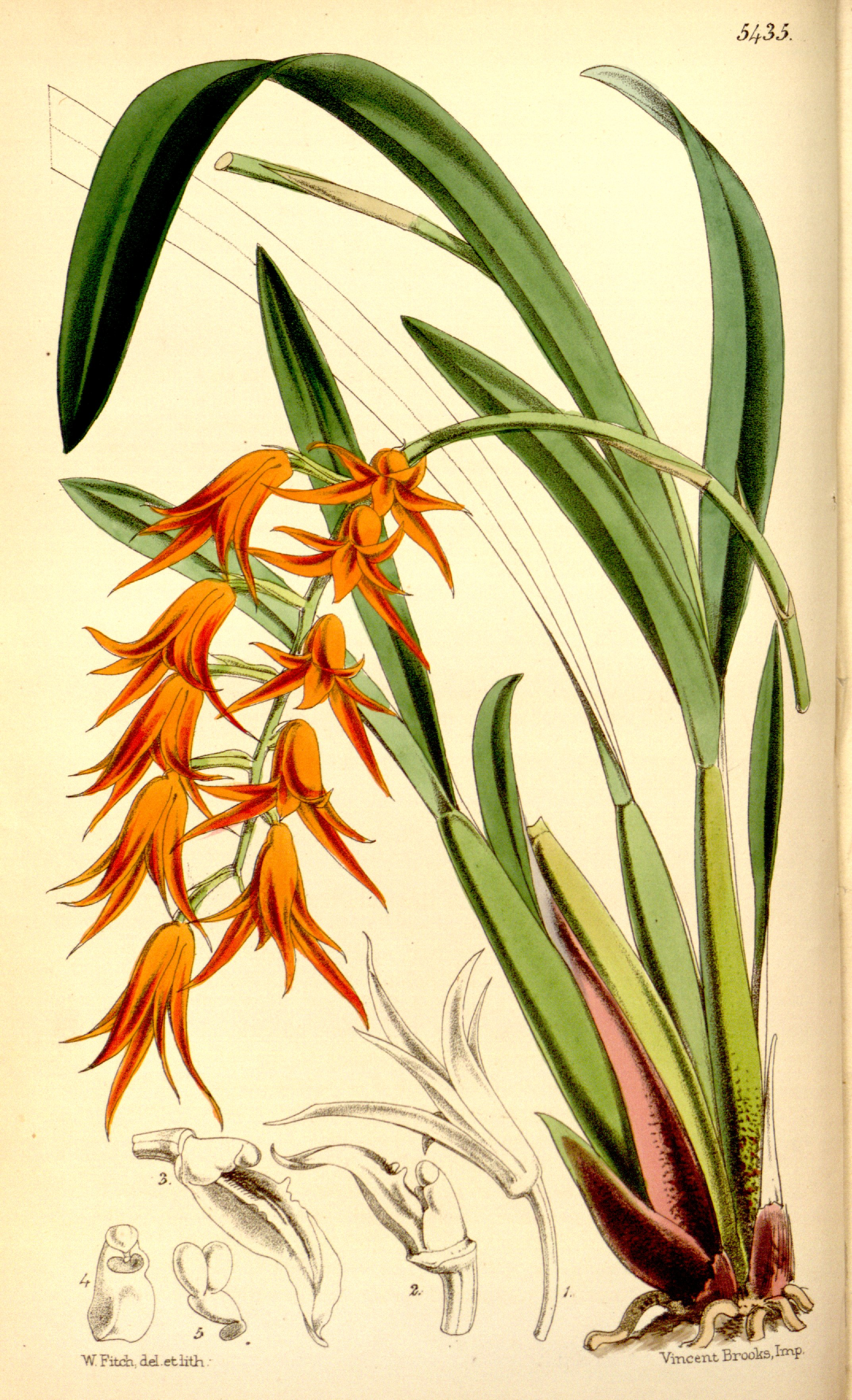
- 1864 Illustration "Curtis's Botanical Magazine"

Scientific classification
- Kingdom: Plantae
- Clade: Embryophytes
- Clade: Tracheophytes
- Clade: Spermatophytes
- Clade: Angiosperms
- Clade: Monocots
- Order: Asparagales
- Family: Orchidaceae
- Subfamily: Epidendroideae
- Genus: Brassia
- Species: B. aurantiaca

Binomial name
- Brassia aurantiaca (Lindl.) M.W.Chase (2011)

Synonyms
- Ada aurantiaca Lindl. (1853); Brassia cinnabarina Linden ex Lindl. (1854); Oncidium cinnabarinum (Linden ex Lindl.) Rchb.f. (1863); Mesospinidium aurantiacum (Lindl.) Rchb.f. (1864); Mesospinidium cinnabarinum (Linden ex Lindl.) Rchb.f. (1864); Ada lehmannii Rolfe (1891); Acropera aurantiaca (Lindl.) B.S.Williams (1896); Ada aurantiaca var. maculata Cogn. in C.A.Cogniaux & A.P.G.Goossens (1899)

= Brassia aurantiaca =

Species of orchid

Brassia aurantiaca is a species of orchid. It is native to Colombia, Ecuador and Venezuela.
