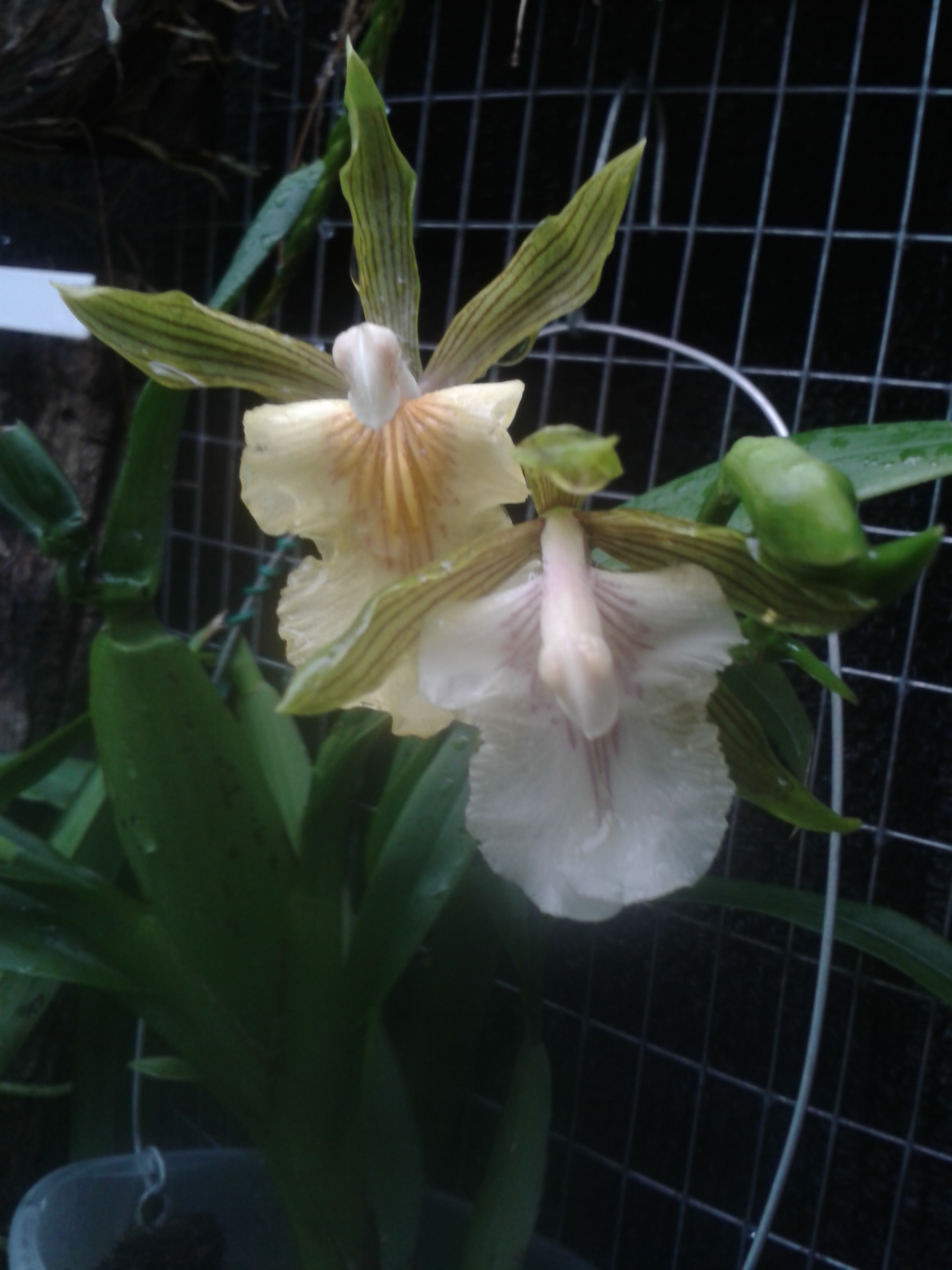

Scientific classification
- Kingdom: Plantae
- Clade: Embryophytes
- Clade: Tracheophytes
- Clade: Spermatophytes
- Clade: Angiosperms
- Clade: Monocots
- Order: Asparagales
- Family: Orchidaceae
- Subfamily: Epidendroideae
- Genus: Aspasia
- Species: A. principissa

Binomial name
- Aspasia principissa Rchb.f.

= Aspasia principissa =

Species of orchid

Aspasia principissa is an orchid in the genus Aspasia ranging from Central America to Colombia and Brazil.

== Description ==
It grows from a pseudobulb. It produces only a few large flowers with coloration of white to pale yellow with pink or lavender streaks. Flowers are wavy and about 2.5 cm (0.98 in) wide. The fruits are narrow and ribbed.

== Pollination ==
This species of orchid is pollinated by bees in the genera Eulaema and Exaerete.
