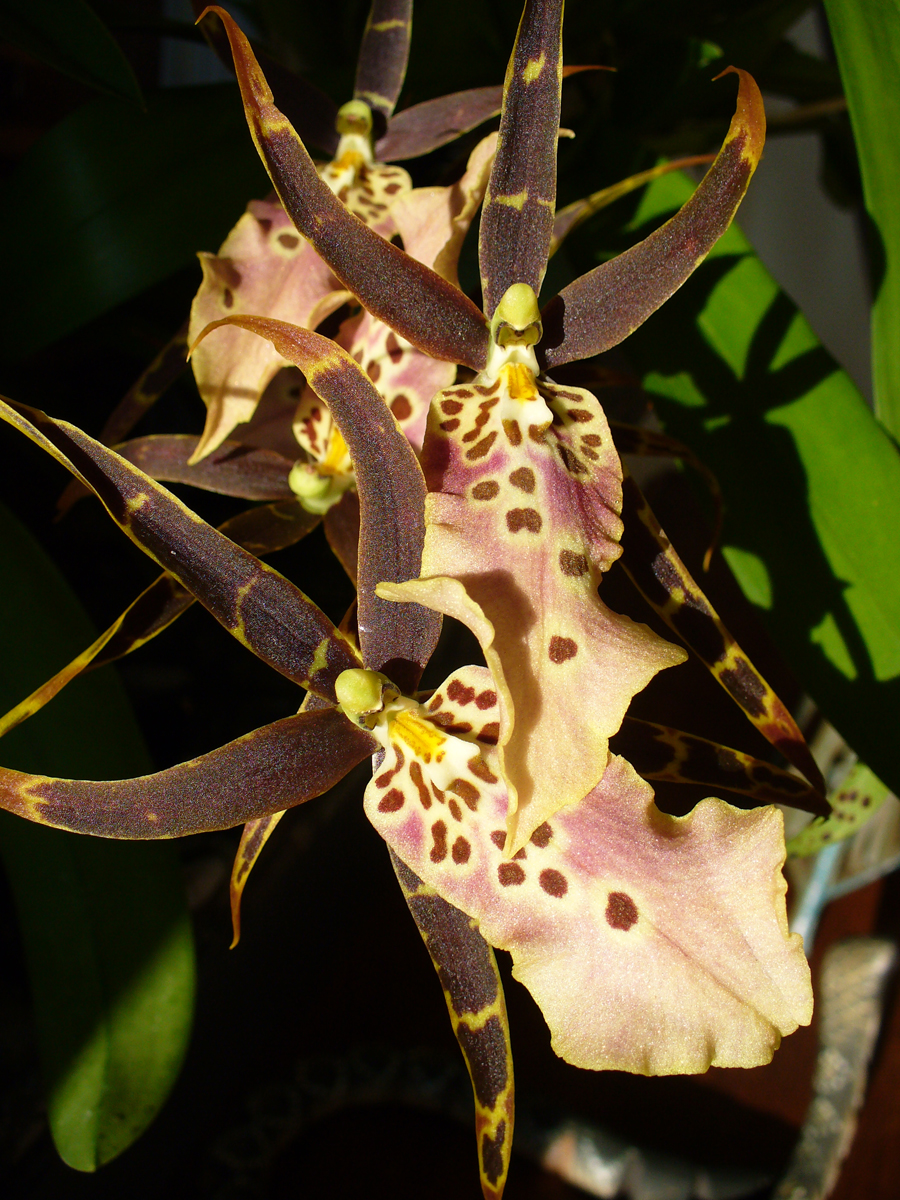
- Brat. Shelob 'Tolkien'

Scientific classification
- Kingdom: Plantae
- Clade: Tracheophytes
- Clade: Angiosperms
- Clade: Monocots
- Order: Asparagales
- Family: Orchidaceae
- Subfamily: Epidendroideae
- Tribe: Cymbidieae
- Subtribe: Oncidiinae
- Genus: × Bratonia; Moir

Synonyms
- × Miltassia

= × Bratonia =

Genus of orchids

× Bratonia, abbreviated Brat. in the horticultural trade, is the nothogenus for intergeneric hybrids between the orchid genera Brassia and Miltonia (Brs. × Milt.). An incorrect synonym for this nothogenus is × Miltassia (Mtssa.).
