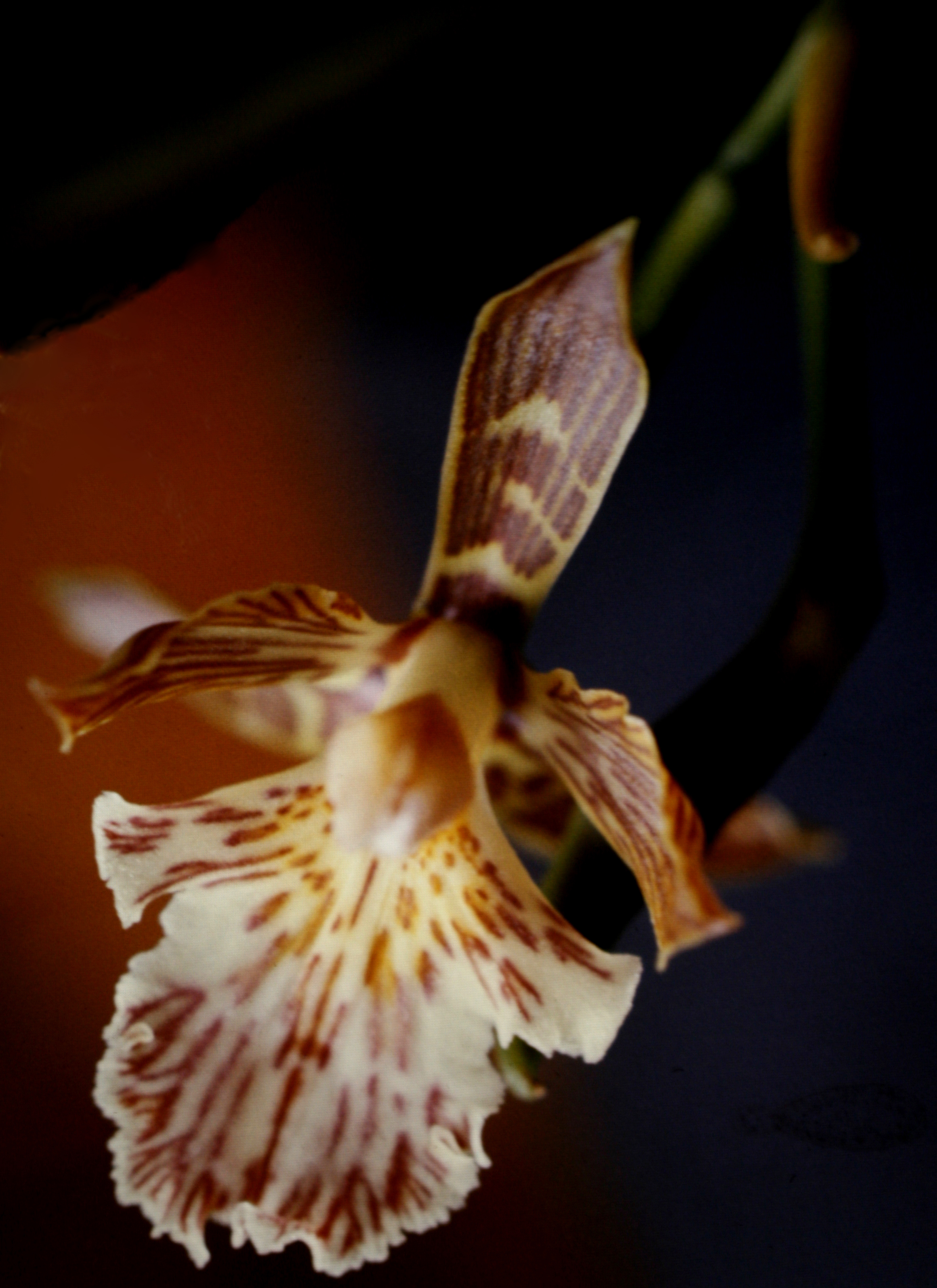
- Aspasia variegata

Scientific classification
- Kingdom: Plantae
- Clade: Tracheophytes
- Clade: Angiosperms
- Clade: Monocots
- Order: Asparagales
- Family: Orchidaceae
- Subfamily: Epidendroideae
- Tribe: Cymbidieae
- Subtribe: Oncidiinae
- Genus: Aspasia; Lindl. (1833)

Type species
- Aspasia epidendroides Lindl.

Species
- Aspasia barclayi; Aspasia epidendroides; Aspasia lunata; Aspasia omissa; Aspasia principissa; Aspasia psittacina; Aspasia silvana; Aspasia variegata

Synonyms
- Trophianthus Scheidw. (1844)

= Aspasia (plant) =

Genus of orchids

Aspasia, abbreviated as Asp. in the horticultural trade, is a genus of 7 species of orchids occurring from southern Mexico to southern Brazil. The genus is closely related to Miltonia and Brassia. Aspasia species have few medium size flowers of exquisite colors which are occasionally cultivated or used to produce artificial hybrids.

== Distribution ==
Aspasia exist in four different areas of Central and South America. Some species are exclusively epiphytic on thick stems of the trees a low height, others live on branches where they get more light and a few occasionally appear as lithophytes.

Two species inhabit primarily Central America the most common is Aspasia epidendroides, that ranges from Mexico to Colombia from sea level to 1,100 meters of altitude but much more common up to 400 meters; and the other is Aspasia principissa, which exists from Colombia to Costa Rica, from sea level to 600 of altitude but often up to 150 meters. Exclusively from Colombia is Aspasia omissa, that is a species recently described whose full range is not yet determined. Aspasia psittacina, endemic in Ecuador, can be found from sea level to 750 of altitude but is much more common up to 300 meters. Aspasia variegata is common in all Amazonian region, from 200 to 1300 meters in Bolivia.

The last area occupied is the Brazilian southeast and south, reaching Bolivia and Paraguay, from 200 to 750 meters, by Aspasia lunata; and Aspasia silvana exclusively at Brazilian Serra do Mar mountains, from Rio de Janeiro to Bahia. These two, as Miltonia do, form large colonies, however, being not particularly common species, they are just occasionally found, mostly on areas of transition between shady forest and open areas both in rain forests and cloud montane forests.

Aspasia lunata is primarily epiphyte on thick stems but often is found living over rock grooves covered by fallen leaves and humid forests where they never are exposed to straight sunlight. Aspasia variegata is found in open forests both in dry and flooded lands, then often on branches of the trees hanging over the waters.

== Description ==
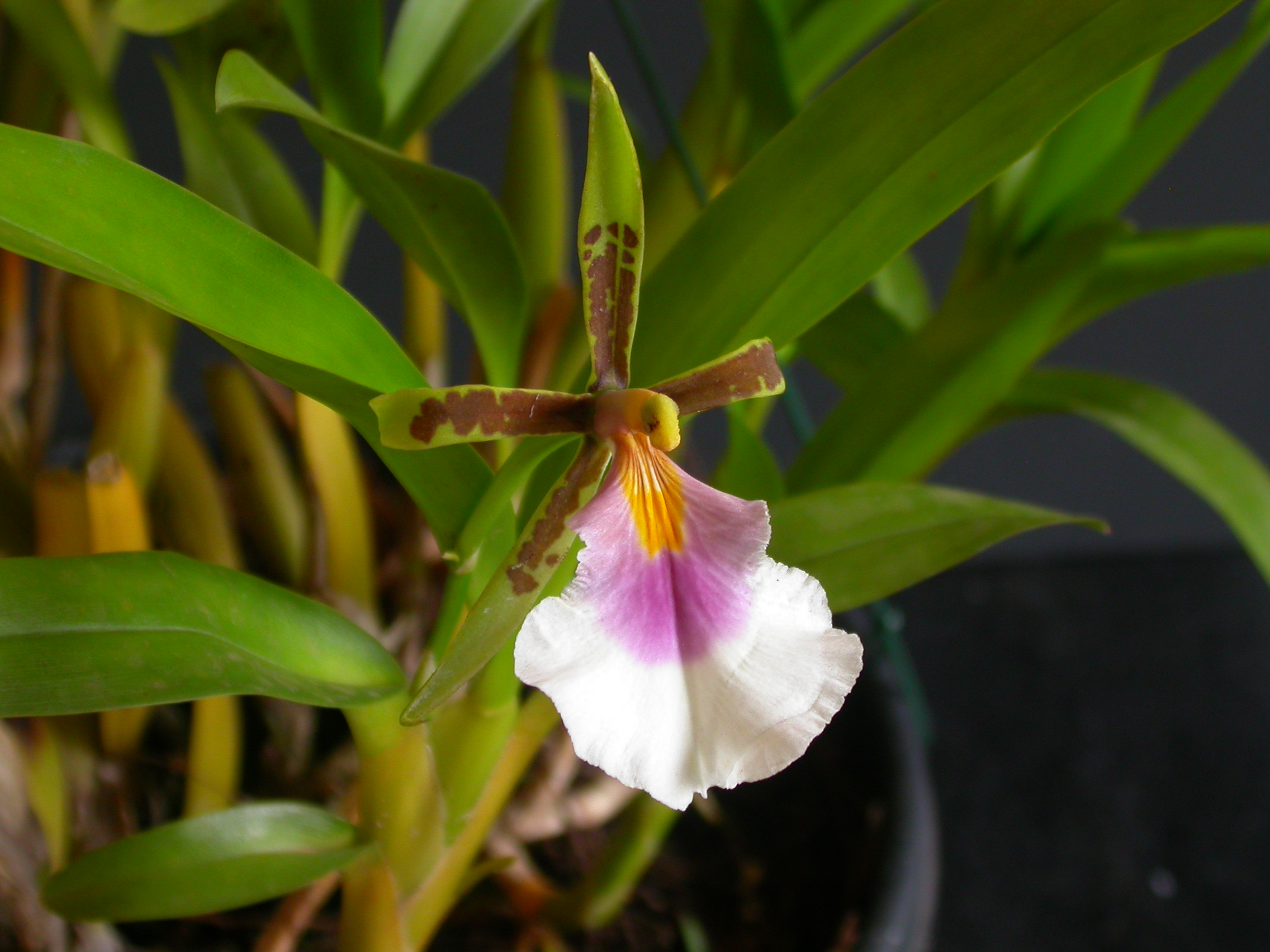
Aspasia silvana was described in 1989, after being confounded with an intergeneric natural hybrid.

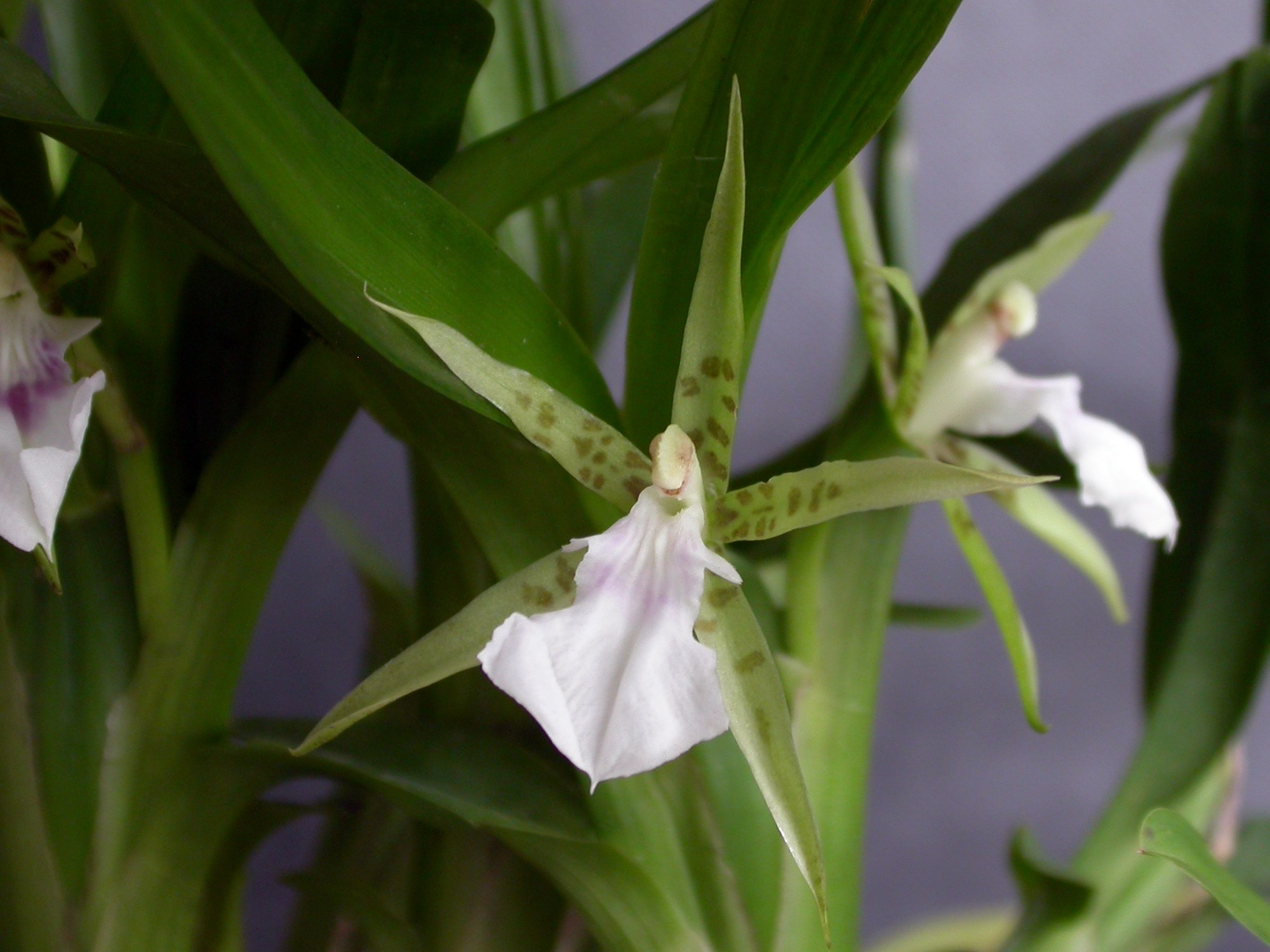
Aspasia lunata: this star shaped species is the most common in the Southeast of Brazil. It resembles A. silvana but is much smaller.

Aspasia is a genus of comparatively robust plants intermediate of Brassia and Miltonia, to which it is morphologically closer although can be distinguished because its flowers show the labellum partially fused to the column up to the middle then abruptly folded down in a square angle. They are characterized for often showing am elongated rhizome, with thicker roots than Miltonia, with more elliptical or elongated and highly laterally flattened pseudobulbs, protected by some foliar sheaths shorter than the leaves, and one or two apical leaves. These are articulated, basally conduplicate, ligulate sometimes with acute apex, thin and narrow, very malleable, light green colored. The inflorescence is erect or arching, shorter than the leaves and bares one to nine flowers sometimes showy, which open in quick sequence holding at least three of four opened at the same time. The inflorescence shoots among the foliar sheaths on the pseudobulbs bases.

The flowers vary according to the species. The petals from more elliptical to more acute, in some species wider than the sepals, in others narrower or similar in size and shape, from flat to concave. The labellum is fused to the inferior half of the column, seeming to emerge from there and thereafter becoming much wider; the blade varies from slightly to clearly three lobed, flat or reflected, fleshier on the center where they have calli or salient veins. The column is elongated, with or without small inferior auricles and presents a large apical anther with two hard yellow pollinia, stipe and viscidium.

Their flowers last for about ten days, however, as not all open at the same time it is common to have a plant blooming during a whole month. Pollination has not been observed and seems to be uncommon for few plants bearing fruits have been seen in nature, however, their floral morphology indicates the possibility of Euglossini bees pollinators. When Aspasia species are used to produce artificial hybrids, the characteristic that seems to predominate is the low number of resulting flowers by inflorescence, prevailing even over the so floriferous Oncidium.

Despite being easy to grow Aspasia species tent to be subject to spots on their thin leaves generally caused by fungi proliferation. They should never be exposed to full sunlight. They are not highly sensitive to temperature but as it varies according to their origin, A. lunata being the one that grows cooler and A. principissa the warmer grower all under intermediate or warm temperatures, when possible it is better to try to reproduce the temperature on their habitats. Also for watering it is important to verify the necessities of each species as they come from different environments. Despite they show a resting period after blooming, Aspasia always need to be watered, more abundantly during active growth. They need at least 75% of humidity and good ventilation all the time. Moderate weekly fertilizing with a balanced formula is beneficial during active growth. They may be potted in a compost of half-chopped Sphagnum, vegetable fiber, and some medium-sized lumps of charcoal, or mounted on plaques of vegetable fiber, however, if mounted, they will need more frequent waterings.

== Taxonomic notes ==
The genus Aspasia was proposed by John Lindley in 1833 when he described its type species, Aspasia epidendroides. The name of the genus is a reference to Aspasia of Miletus a friend of Pericles. Its original description is very brief and mentions the plant was native in Panama and West Colombia. Three years later he described two species more: Aspasia lunata and A. variegata.

Since its first species was described, sixteen names have been submitted to Aspasia, from these, seven are generally accepted as good species, two species remain unclear, six are considered synonyms of the accepted ones, and only one has been moved to another genus: A. pusilla was submitted to the genus Cischweinfia, of which it is the type species.

Being well defined from the start, Aspasia has hardly been a genus subject to disputes. Its only synonym is the genus Trophianthus, proposed in 1844 by Michael Scheidweiler to Aspasia lunata, because of its slight differences from the other successive flowering species, however, this genus was never largely accepted by taxonomists. Provided it was, today it would include also A. silvana. Aspasia lunata was also described again in 1855, by Reichenbach, under the genus Miltonia as M. odorata. Although having initially accepted the genus, Reichenbach decided all Aspasia would be better placed under the genus Odontoglossum and, in 1864, he proposed this transfer. The idea apparently was not welcome and in 1878 Reichenbach was again accepting Aspasia as a good genus because at the time he transferred Odontoglossum psittacinum, a plant re received from Ecuador and described two years earlier, to Aspasia.

Aspasia principissa was described by Reichenbach based on a plant he received from Panama, in 1864, but, in 1949, Paul Hamilton Allen, considering it very close to Aspasia epidendroides, proposed it to be classified just as a variety of the later, however his classification was not widely accepted. In 2004, Eric A. Christenson, claiming that a new species of Aspasia from Colombia was long confused with A. principissa described it as A. omissa.

In 1978, Guido Pasbt illustrated a plant in Orchidaceae Brasilienses under the name Milpasia Leslie-Garay. Later this species was found again in Bahia, Espírito Santo and Rio de Janeiro States of Brazil and it became clear it was not a hybrid but a true species, in 1989, Fábio de Barros described with its current name, Aspasia silvana.

Two species, Aspasia lyrata and A. biberiana, have not been seen again since their original collections and are not positively identified. Both have been described to Brazil. The first, originally described as Epidendrum lyratum, in 1831, was observed by José Maria da Conceição Velloso in Rio de Janeiro. It shows more elongated pseudobulbs of rounder section, and its inflorescence is longer than the leaves with one small flower at the apex. Some taxonomists suppose it might be a natural hybrid, maybe of A. lunata with Miltonia regnellii, or not an Aspasia at all. Provided it really is an Aspasia, then it was the first to be described. The other species, Aspasia biberiana, was described by Reichenbach to Pará State, in Amazon forest; it has solitary green flowers. No known Aspasia from that area fits this description; apparently no taxonomist has checked the original description lately, therefore, more research is needed to positively identify this species. It is possible it was not really from Brazil and is a synonym of A. principissa.

Molecular analysis show that Aspasia most closely related important genera are Miltonia and Brassia, which are included in one of the eight clades that form the subtribus Oncidiinae of tribus Cymbidieae.

== Species ==
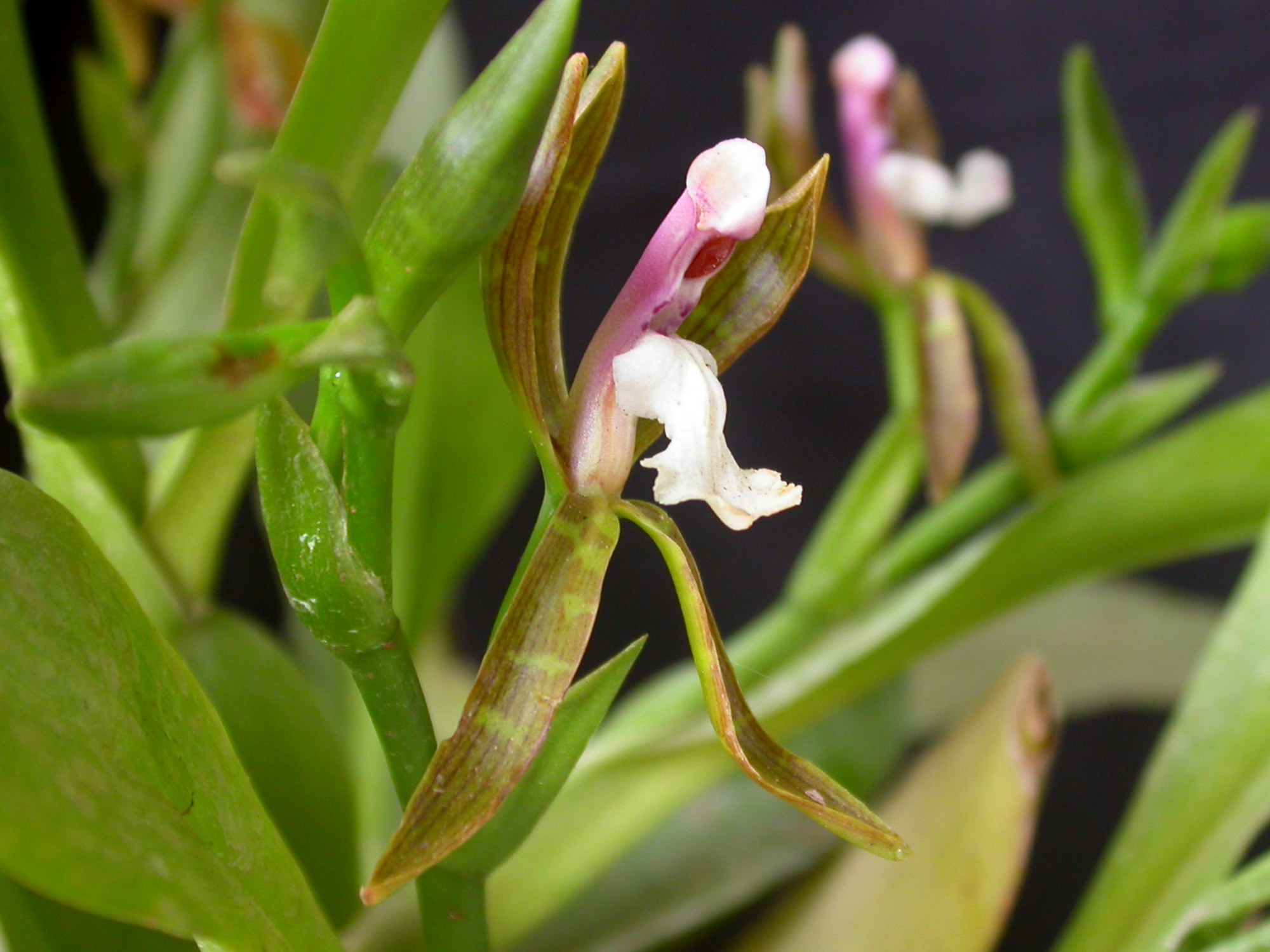
Aspasia psittacina is the only species that exists in Ecuador. Although it is the largest Aspasia plant, its flowers are not larger than most.

The species that exist on the Southeast of Brazil are the only two Aspasia to have a flat labellum. They can be easily separated from each other for A. silvana is a larger plant with longer rhizome and pseudobulbs that have an elongated base making them much taller than the ones of A. lunata. The flowers of A. silvana are three times larger than the ones of A. lunata. Both species, like Miltonia spectabilis to which the slightly resemble, have just one flower, hardly ever two, per inflorescence. Both bloom from middle to the end of spring.

All the other Aspasia species bloom in quick succession. Aspasia variegata is similar to A. epidendroides but the plant is much smaller. The pseudobulbs of A. epidendroides are more than two times larger and much flatter, more elliptic, And A. variegata normally shows a flatter labellum with short purple stripes while A. epidendroides has more large stains close to its center. A. variegata blooms between the start of summer and middle fall and presents nice fragrance in the morning.

Aspasia epidendroides, A. omissa and A. principissa are similar but the latter is less robust and with larger flowers than A. epidendroides. Other less noticeable differences include: A. epidendroides has broad transverse markings on the lateral sepals, the column with an elliptic depression below the stigma and the apical half of the labellum is porrect while A. principissa has narrow longitudinal stripes on the lateral sepals, the column with a narrow linear groove below the stigma and the apical half of the labellum is not porrect. When Christenson described A. omissa, he claimed this differences were in fact the ones between A. epidendroides and A. omissa and that the real A. principissa is a plant with larger and more green flowers and general paler colors.

Aspasia psittacina is the only species found in Ecuador. It is vegetatively close to A. epidendroides, with large elliptic and highly flat pseudobulbs, it shows the same colors of the later, but has narrower flowers with the labellum proportionally much smaller.
