= Libor (name) =

Libor is a Czech masculine given name of Latin origin, derived from Libare ("sacrifice") or Libarius ("free").

== People with the name Libor ==
- Libor Capalini, Czech athlete
- Libor Charfreitag (born 1977), Slovak athlete
- Libor Došek, Czech footballer
- Libor Dvořák (born 1957), Czechoslovak sprint canoer
- Libor Hajek (born 1998), Czech professional ice hockey player
- Libor Hudáček (born 1990), Slovak ice hockey player
- Libor Kozák (born 1989), Czech footballer
- Libor Malina, Czech athlete
- Libor Nováček, Czech pianist
- Libor Pešek, Czech dirigent
- Libor Pimek (born 1963), tennis player
- Libor Pivko, Czech ice hockey player
- Libor Polášek, Czech ice hockey player
- Libor Procházka, Czech ice hockey player
- Libor Radimec, Czechoslovak footballer
- Libor Rouček, Czech politician
- Libor Sionko (born 1977), Czech footballer
- Libor Vondráček (born 1994), Czech politician
- Libor Zábranský (disambiguation), several people
- Libor Žůrek, Czech footballer

== See also ==
- Libor (disambiguation)
- Liborius (disambiguation)

== Articles ==
- All pages beginning with Libor
