= Borsch (surname) =

Origin
- Language: German from West Slavic
- Meaning: from the personal name Liborius; from the Slavic personal name Borislav
- Region of origin: Germany, United States, Austria

Other names
- Cognates: Börsch, Porsch

Borsch or Börsch is a German and North American last name which is either derived from the first name of Latin origin Liborius or from a diminutive of the Slavic personal name Borislav (from Proto-Slavic *boriti "to battle" and *slàva "glory, fame"). Notable people with the surname include:

- Anton Börsch (1854–1920), German geodesist, astronomer, and geophysicist
- Axel Börsch-Supan (born 1954), German economist
- Frederick H. Borsch (1935–2017), American clergyman
- João Borsch (born 2000), stage name of Portuguese musician João Borges
- Karl Borsch (born 1959), German clergyman
- Stefan Borsch (born 1947), Swedish musician
- Willie Borsch (1930–1991), American AA/FA and funny car drag racer

== See also ==
- Viktor Borshch (born 1948), Russian volleyball player
