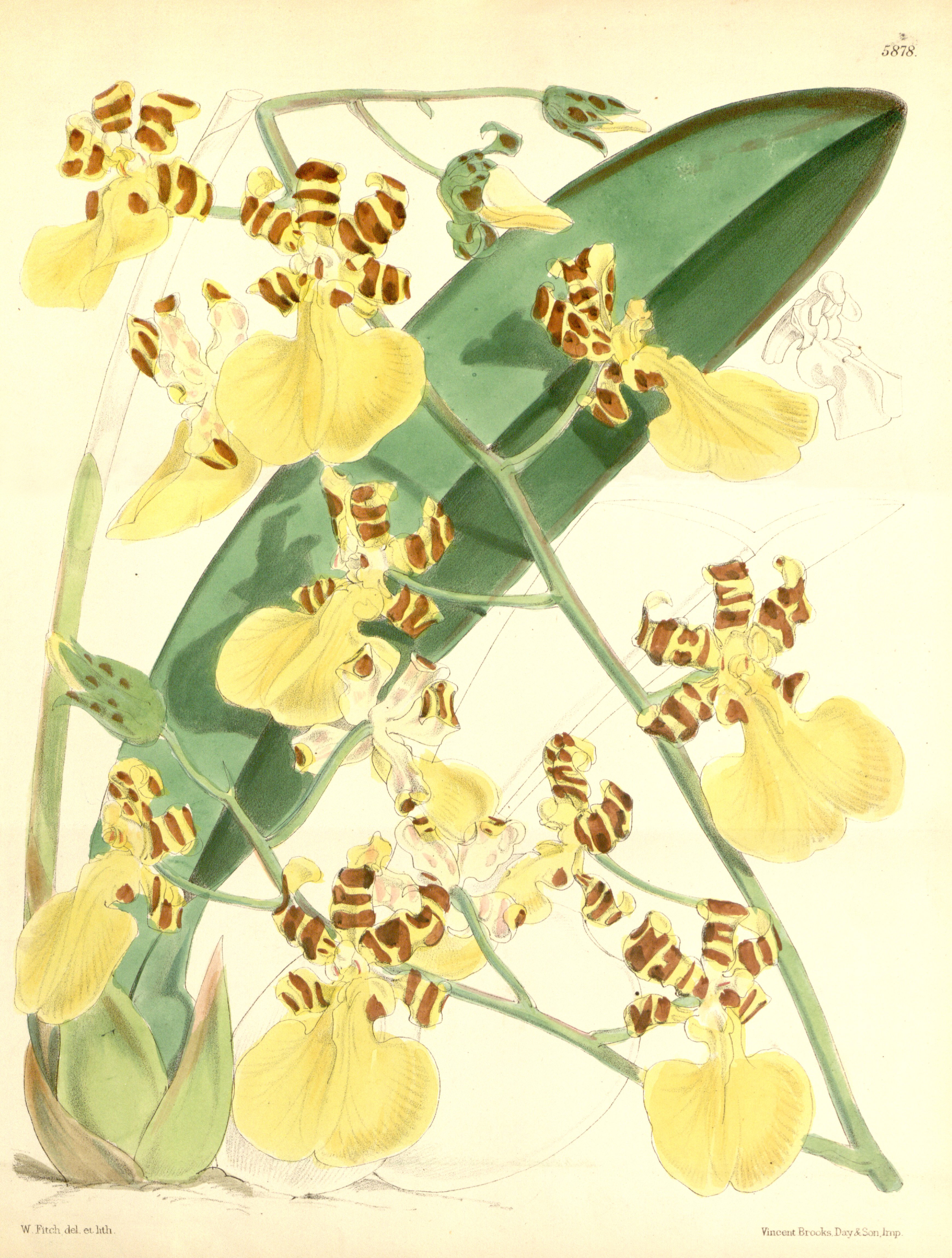
- Trichocentrum splendidum illustration

Scientific classification
- Kingdom: Plantae
- Clade: Tracheophytes
- Clade: Angiosperms
- Clade: Monocots
- Order: Asparagales
- Family: Orchidaceae
- Subfamily: Epidendroideae
- Genus: Trichocentrum
- Species: T. splendidum

Binomial name
- Trichocentrum splendidum (A.Rich. ex Duch.) M.W.Chase & N.H.Williams

Synonyms
- Oncidium splendidum A.Rich. ex Duch. (basionym); Oncidium tigrinum var. splendidum (A.Rich. ex Duch.) Hook.f.; Oncidium splendidum var. holoxanthum auct.; Oncidium splendidum var. xanthinum auct.; Lophiaris splendida (A.Rich. ex Duch.) Christenson; Lophiaris splendida f. holoxantha (auct.) Christenson; Lophiarella splendida (A.Rich. ex Duch.) Carnevali & Cetzal

= Trichocentrum splendidum =

Species of orchid

Trichocentrum splendidum is a species of orchid endemic to Guatemala.
