= Lacerum =

Lacerum or lacer from Latin may refer to:

In anatomy and medicine:

- Foramen lacerum, a triangular hole in the base of the skull
- Lacerum segment, a part of the course of the internal carotid artery

In biology:

Animals:
- Lepton lacerum, a species of saltwater clam in the family Lasaeidae
Plants:
- Trichocentrum lacerum, a species of orchid found from Central America to Colombia
- Moxostoma lacerum or Harlip sucker, an extinct species of ray-finned fish in the family Catostomidae
