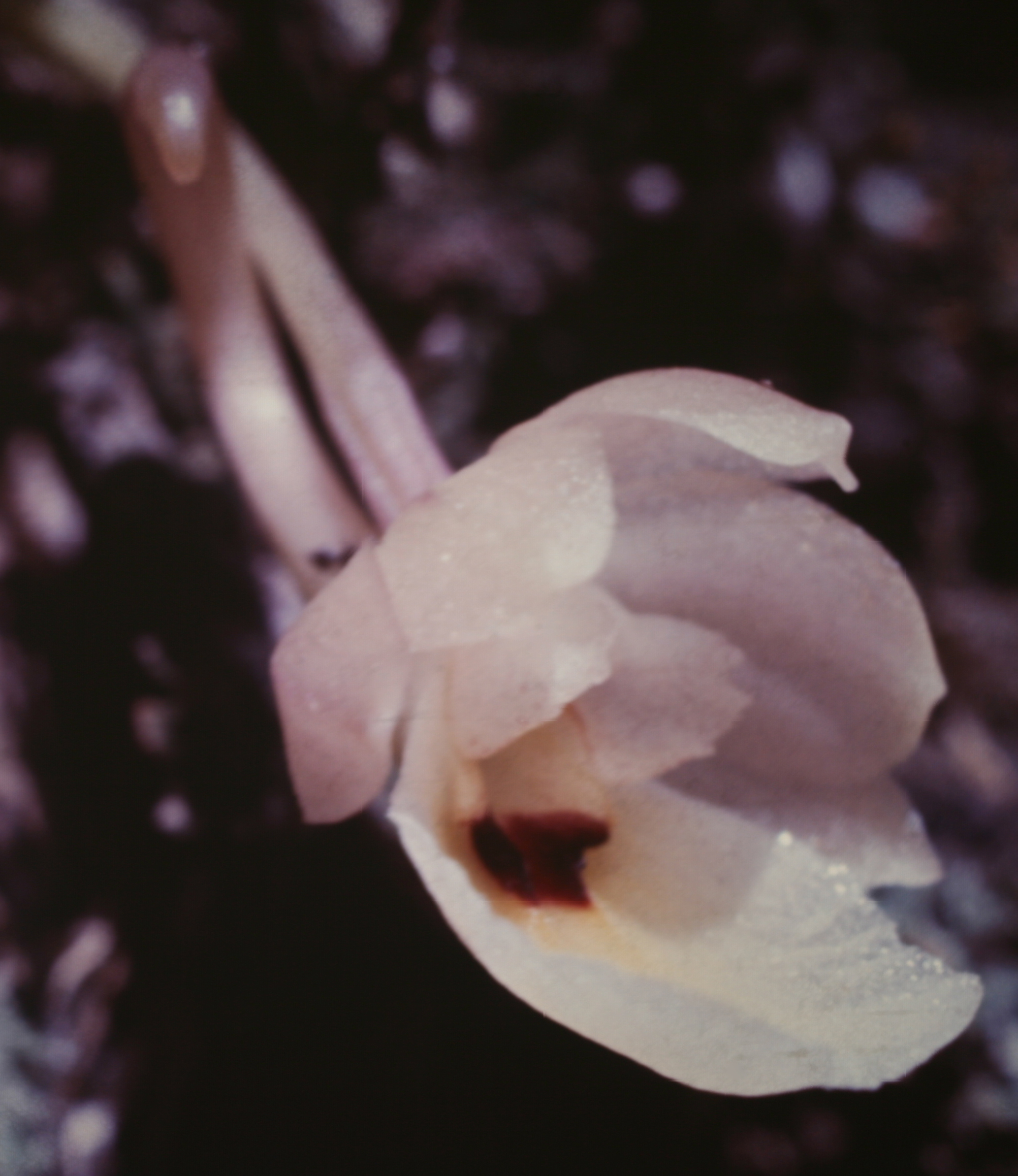

Scientific classification
- Kingdom: Plantae
- Clade: Tracheophytes
- Clade: Angiosperms
- Clade: Monocots
- Order: Asparagales
- Family: Orchidaceae
- Subfamily: Epidendroideae
- Genus: Trichocentrum
- Species: T. fuscum

Binomial name
- Trichocentrum fuscum Lindl.

Synonyms
- Acoidium fuscum Lindl.; Trichocentrum cornucopiae Linden & Rchb.f.; Trichocentrum fuscum var. krameri Rchb.f.; Trichocentrum cornucopiae var. fuscatum Porsch

= Trichocentrum fuscum =

Dark trichocentrum

Species of orchid

Trichocentrum fuscum, commonly known as the dark trichocentrum, is a species of orchid found in Venezuela, Suriname, Brazil, Ecuador, Peru, and Bolivia.
