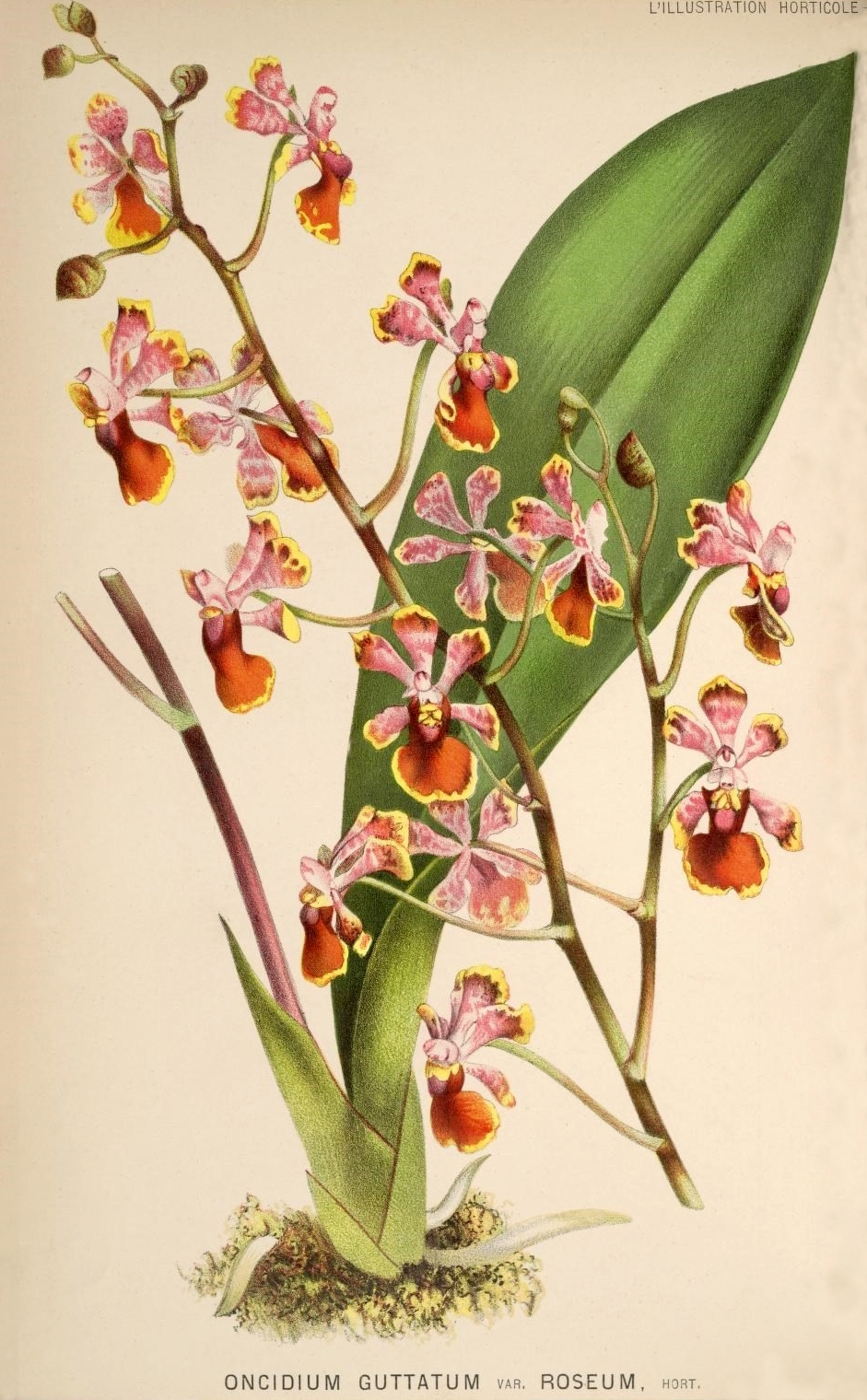
- Illustration as Oncidium guttatum var. roseum

Scientific classification
- Kingdom: Plantae
- Clade: Tracheophytes
- Clade: Angiosperms
- Clade: Monocots
- Order: Asparagales
- Family: Orchidaceae
- Subfamily: Epidendroideae
- Genus: Trichocentrum
- Species: T. cosymbephorum

Binomial name
- Trichocentrum cosymbephorum (C.Morren) R.Jiménez & Carnevali

Synonyms
- Lophiaris cosymbephora (C.Morren) R.Jiménez & Carnevali; Oncidium cosymbephorum C.Morren; Oncidium guttatum var. morrenii (Lindl.) Rchb.f.; Oncidium guttatum var. roseum Linden; Oncidium henchmannii (Knowles & Westc.) Lodd. ex Paxton; Oncidium luridum var. henchmannii Knowles & Westc.; Oncidium luridum var. morrenii Lindl.

= Trichocentrum cosymbephorum =

Species of plant

Trichocentrum cosymbephorum is a species of flowering plant in the orchid family Orchidaceae, endemic to Mexico. It was first described by Charles Morren in 1849 as Oncidium cosymbephorum.
