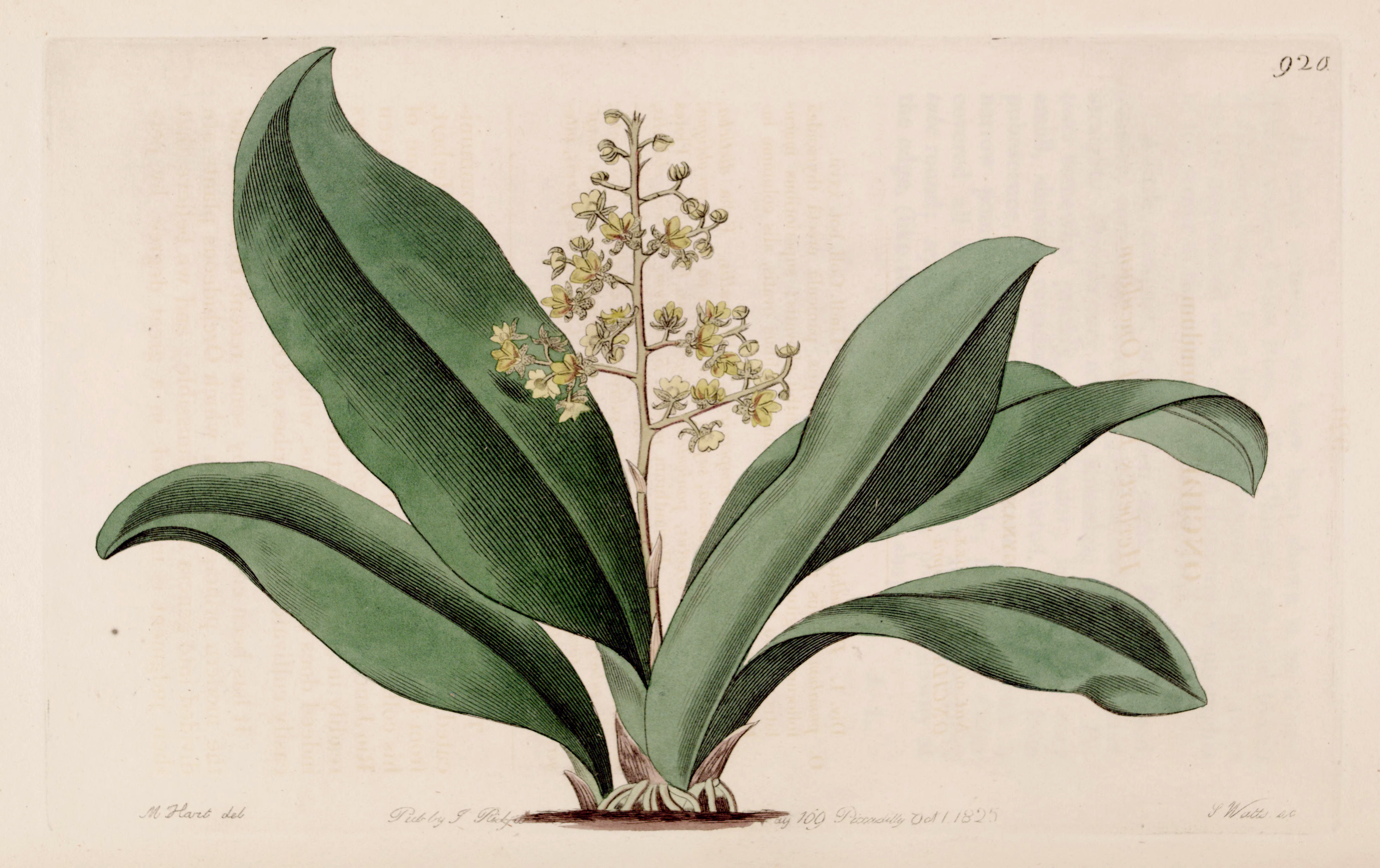
- Trichocentrum pumilum illustration

Scientific classification
- Kingdom: Plantae
- Clade: Tracheophytes
- Clade: Angiosperms
- Clade: Monocots
- Order: Asparagales
- Family: Orchidaceae
- Subfamily: Epidendroideae
- Genus: Trichocentrum
- Species: T. pumilum

Binomial name
- Trichocentrum pumilum (Lindl.) M.W.Chase & N.H.Williams

Synonyms
- Oncidium pumilum Lindl. (basionym); Epidendrum ligulatum Vell.; Oncidium pumilum var. angustifolium Cogn.; Oncidium pumilum var. robustum Cogn.; Oncidium pumilum var. laxum Kraenzl.; Oncidium pumilum var. megalanthum Schltr.; Oncidium minutiflorum Schltr.; Lophiaris pumila (Lindl.) Braem

= Trichocentrum pumilum =

Species of orchid

Trichocentrum pumilum is a species of orchid found from Brazil to northeastern Argentina.

It is a pseudobulbous epiphyte, and grows primarily in savannahs and montane forests. Trichocentrum pumilum blooms in winter and spring.

== Description ==
Trichocentrum pumilum is described as a "miniature-sized", mule eared, epiphyte which grows best in hot climates.

The pseudobulbs grow in a small, clustered, broadly ovoid, and compressed fashion, and the plant carries single, apical, coriaceous, suberect, oblong to ligulate, subacute leaves.

Branches are erect, ranging in length from 5–8 cm. Flowers range in size from 5-8mm, with a densely multi-flowered inflorescence with a coriaceous, ovate, acute bracts and small campanulate flowers.
