= Trichocentrum silverarum =

Scientific classification
- Kingdom: Plantae
- Clade: Embryophytes
- Clade: Tracheophytes
- Clade: Spermatophytes
- Clade: Angiosperms
- Clade: Monocots
- Order: Asparagales
- Family: Orchidaceae
- Subfamily: Epidendroideae
- Genus: Trichocentrum
- Species: T. silverarum

Binomial name
- Trichocentrum silverarum (Carnevali & Cetzal) J.M.H.Shaw

Synonyms
- Lophiaris silverarum

Species of orchid

Trichocentrum silverarum is a type of orchid native to Panama. It was named after its discoverers, Gaspar Silvera and his daughter Dr. Katia Silvera. Originally described as Lophiaris silverarum, it is now placed within the Trichocentrum genus. Dr. Silvera stated in 2014 when it was discovered, that species were being propagated in vitro in Panama in the hopes that commercial use would become available.

== Etymology ==
Trichocentrum silverarum (originally Lophiaris silverarum) is named after Gaspar Silvera and his daughter, Dr. Katia Silvera who discovered the species during a field trip to a mountainous region in central Panama. Katia Silvera, a postdoctoral scholar at the University of California, was unable to identify the species of orchid, sending it to the orchid experts Carnevali and Cetzal in Mexico. In 2014, Carnevali and Gustavo A. Romero-Gonzalez named the species Lophiaris silverarum in honor of the father and daughter who discovered it. Although the species of orchid was originally described as L. silverarum, it has been placed in the Trichocentrum genus.

The genus Trichocentrum is derived from the Greek trichos, meaning hair and kentron meaning spur. This description refers to the extremely thin, hair-like spur found on the flower of many species in the genus. The common name of the species T. silverarum is the mule-ear orchid, referring to the foliage of the plant.

== Description ==
The flowers of the species Trichocentrum silverarum are considered large for the genus. The flowers are typically a straw-yellow color, with reddish brown spotting on the three sepals and two petals. The flowers are 25 to 30 millimeters in diameter, with the dorsal sepal being 12 to 14 by 8 to 11 millimeters; the isthmus of the labellum is 5 millimeters in width. The reddish-brown speckles are 0.7 to 1 millimeter in diameter and are always non-confluent, with a pattern of heterogeneous dispersal over the entire surface of the flower. The petals and sepals color fades into white nearing the column and lip. The inflorescence is short-lived, typically flowering for about a month or less, in comparison to most of the species in the Trichocentrum genus, but is considered dense. The blooming period happens during the month of November, typically ending in December or January.

The foliage is thick and fleshy, typically growing very long, giving the species the common name 'mule-ear' after the ear-like shape the foliage resembles. The leaves are typically between 15 to 47 centimeters long and 3 to 10 centimeters wide. The foliage is a bright green color, becoming pale towards the base. The underside of the leaves have been shown to be a very light purple in some rare cases. The stem and root structure are described as being pseudobulbous epiphyte typically being 79 to 94 centimeters long. As with most other species in the Trichocentrum genus, T. silverarum produces seeds for reproduction, with a slow growing period of nearly four years from seed to full grown as described in a laboratory setting.

== Distribution and Ecology ==
The species Trichocentrum silverarum is known to only grown naturally in mountainous areas of central Panama. The area the species resides within is a wet, tropical biome. As of 2014, T. silverarum has only been seen in two specific locations in central Panama, one grouping being in the Veraguas Province, and the other being located in the Coclé Province. The two localities are 115 kilometers apart and have an unusual climate, described as a tropical dry forest, with roughly 2,000 mm of precipitation. They are typically found growing on the branches and trunks of trees where they can stay humid, warm, and somewhat shaded.

== Conservation ==
Trichocentrum silverarum is considered a threatened species, with very few species being noted in its two localities of central Panama. Since the discovery in 2014, no other scientific publications have mentioned T. silverarum, leaving the fate of the species in its natural environment unknown. Dr. Silvera spoke of the process of her fathers orchid company in Panama attempting to propagate the species in vitro; however, the seed to first bloom takes about four years, making the process of propagation very slow. Some online sellers in Seattle claim to have commercial use of T. silverarum, making it a 'high value' species of orchid for sale.
