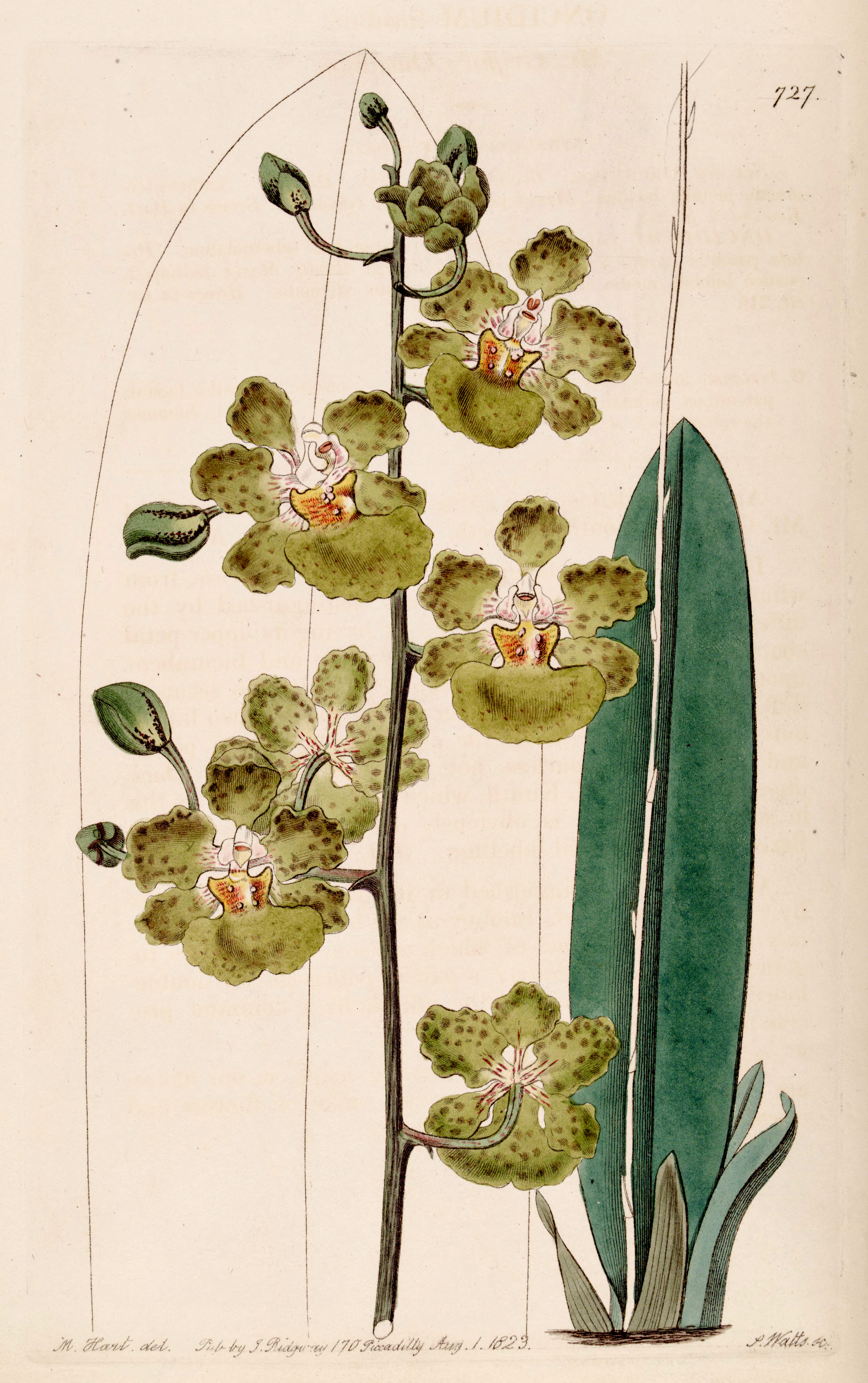
- Trichocentrum luridum illustration

Scientific classification
- Kingdom: Plantae
- Clade: Tracheophytes
- Clade: Angiosperms
- Clade: Monocots
- Order: Asparagales
- Family: Orchidaceae
- Subfamily: Epidendroideae
- Genus: Trichocentrum
- Species: T. luridum

Binomial name
- Trichocentrum luridum (Lindl.) M.W.Chase & N.H.Williams

Synonyms
- Lophiaris lurida (Lindl.) Braem; Oncidium luridum Lindl. (basionym)

= Trichocentrum luridum =

Species of orchid

Trichocentrum luridum is a species of orchid found from Mexico through parts of Central America to northern South America (Belize, Colombia, French Guiana, Guatemala, Guyana, Honduras, Mexico, Trinidad and Tobago, and Venezuela). It was first described in 1823 by John Lindley as Oncidium luridum. It is placed in the subtribe Oncidiinae.
