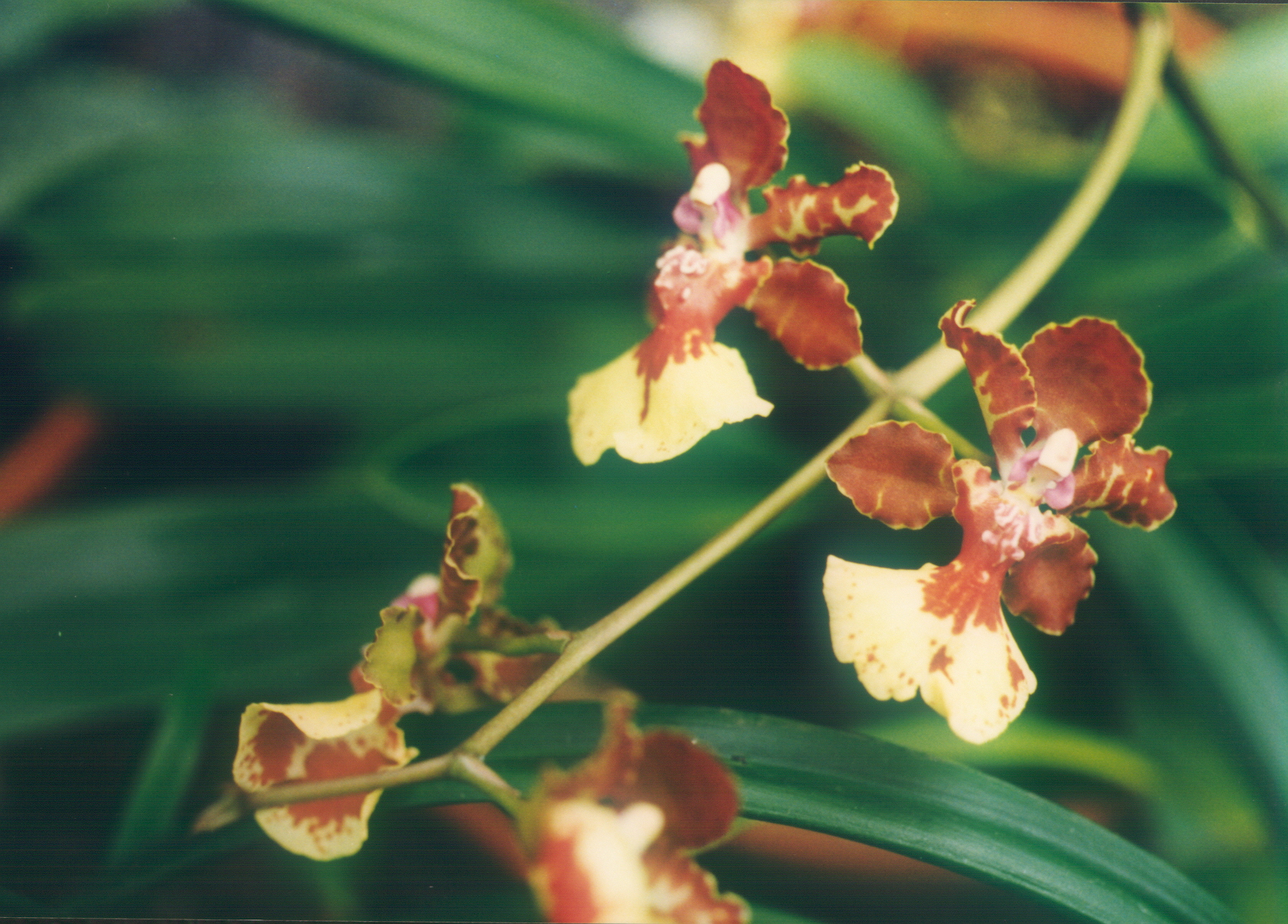
- Trichocentrum haematochilum

Scientific classification
- Kingdom: Plantae
- Clade: Tracheophytes
- Clade: Angiosperms
- Clade: Monocots
- Order: Asparagales
- Family: Orchidaceae
- Subfamily: Epidendroideae
- Tribe: Cymbidieae
- Subtribe: Oncidiinae
- Genus: Trichocentrum; Poepp. & Endl.

Type species
- Trichocentrum pulchrum Poepp. & Endl.

Synonyms
- Acoidium Lindl.; Lophiaris Raf.; Cohnia Rchb.f., illegitimate name; Cohniella Pfitzer in H.G.A.Engler & K.A.E.Prantl; Stilifolium Königer & D.Pongratz; Lophiarella Szlach., Mytnik & Romowicz

= Trichocentrum =

Genus of orchids

Trichocentrum, often abbreviated Trctm in horticulture, is a genus in the orchid family, Orchidaceae. Dancinglady orchid is a common name for plants in this genus. It was described by Stephan Ladislaus Endlicher and Eduard Friedrich Poeppig in 1836. This genus alone makes up the monogeneric Trichocentrum alliance, a quite distinct lineage of the subtribe Oncidiinae.

In 2024, Trichocentrum was expanded to include the genera Grandiphyllum and Saundersia, with the latter two synonymized.

As of October 2025, Plants of the World Online recognized 101 species within this genus (plus some hybrids), distributed in damp forests from Mexico and Florida to Argentina.

== Description ==
The pseudobulbs are reduced. The obtuse, fleshy leaves are 9 cm long. They are broadly elliptic to ovate-lanceolate.

The large, showy flowers grow basally on a short peduncle in a single-flowered to few-flowered raceme. They are white, or white covered with maroon dots. The petals and sepals are similar.

The long lip carries a short spur. This feature distinguishes the genus from other Oncidiinae, in which the spur is an extension of the column. The short column has a pair of apical wings on the stigma. The anther often bears minute papillae. There are two waxy pollinia, connected to elongate stipes.

== Taxonomy ==
There is disagreement as to the taxonomic status of some species that were moved from Oncidium to Trichocentrum. Morphological characteristics of "typical" trichocentrums, such as being relatively small and squat with a short, few-to-several flowered inflorescence, contrasts sharply with the larger, heavier oncidiums with long, "mule-ear" leaves and showy, branched inflorescences with many flowers, or the "rat-tail" species with terete leaves.

While studies of molecular phylogeny has caused substantial reclassifications, it is uncertain whether this new scheme will be widely adopted. As with many plants, hybridisation might heavily confound cladistic analyses, though the exact extent is unknown. Hybridisation of Trichocentrum with Oncidium has resulted in the hybrid genus × Trichocidium for example, and similar events in the past would result in unrealistic assessments of relationship based on molecular phylogenetic studies with too limited a scope.

In 2024, Trichocentrum was expanded to include the genera Grandiphyllum and Saundersia. As of October 2025, the expansion is accepted by Plants of the World Online, but not by other sources, such as the World Flora Online.

=== Species ===
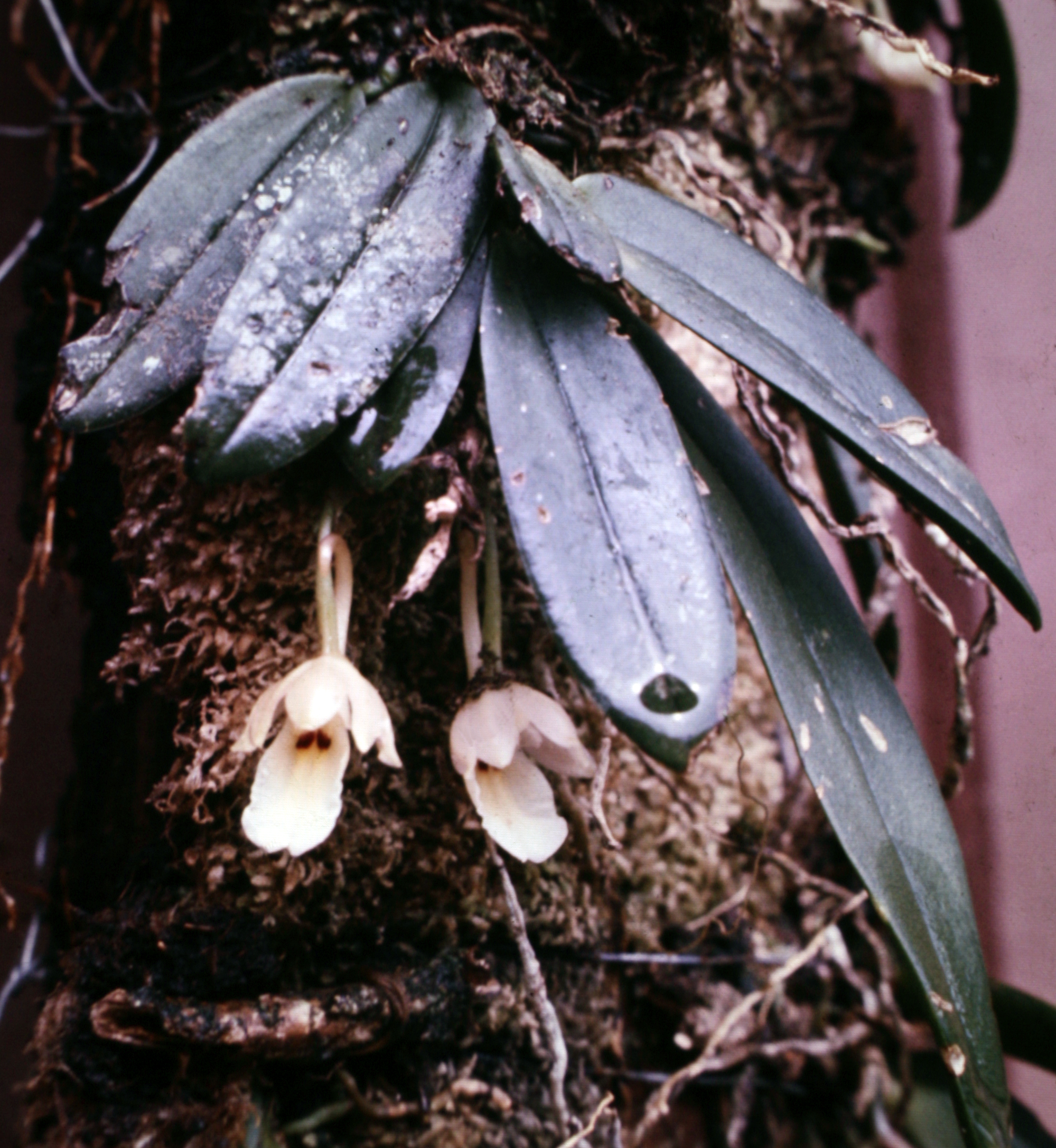
Dark trichocentrum, Trichocentrum fuscum

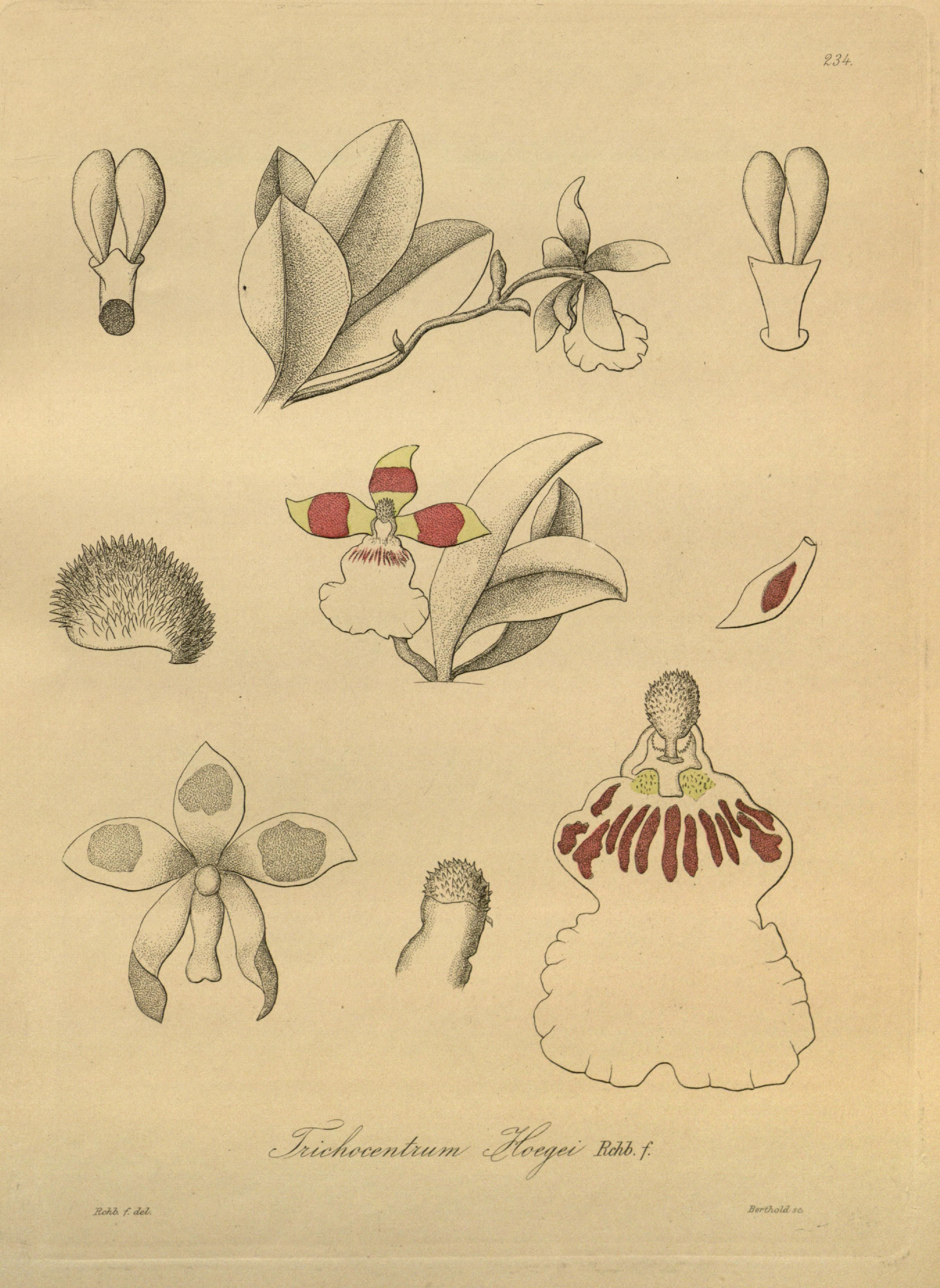
Trichocentrum hoegei parts drawing, 1900 illustration

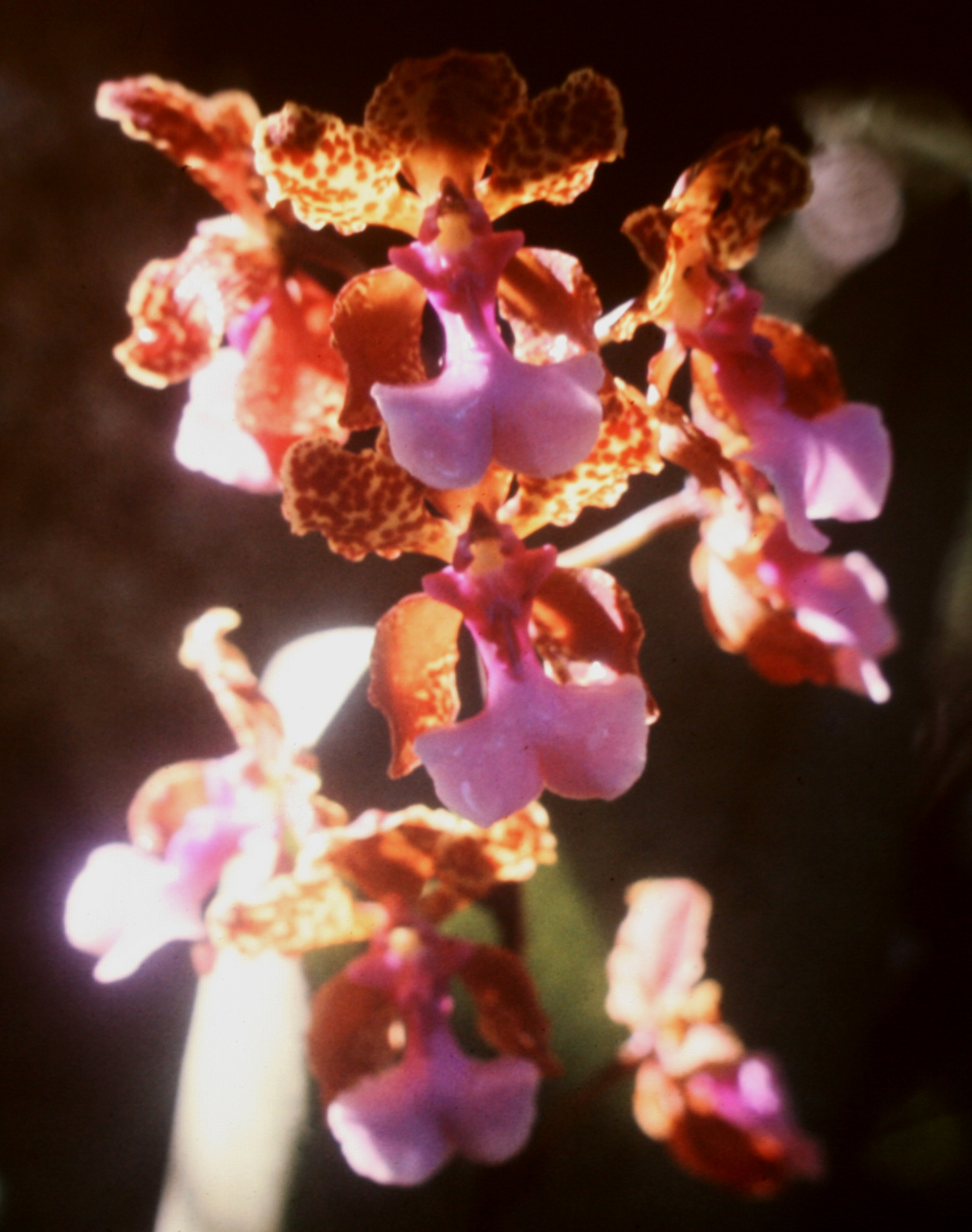
Trichocentrum lanceanum

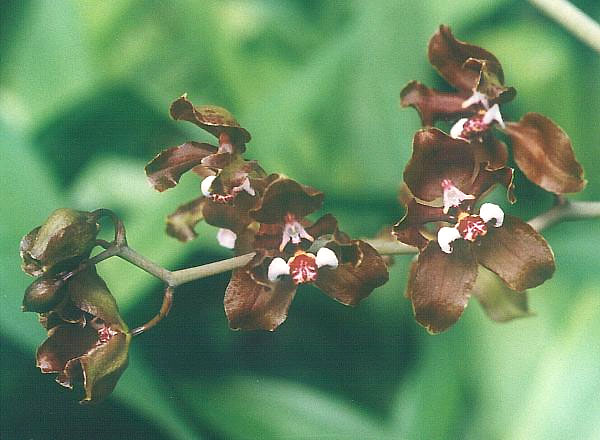
Trichocentrum microchilum

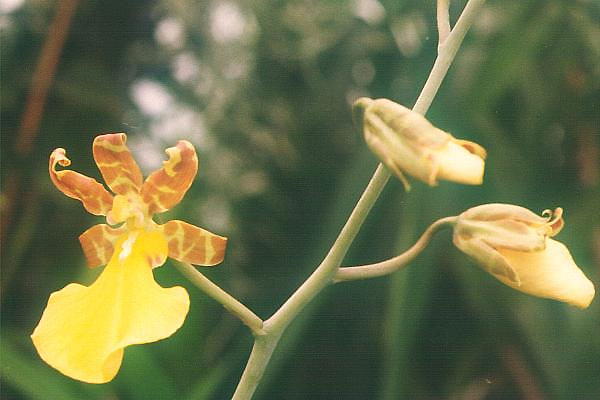
Trichocentrum splendidum

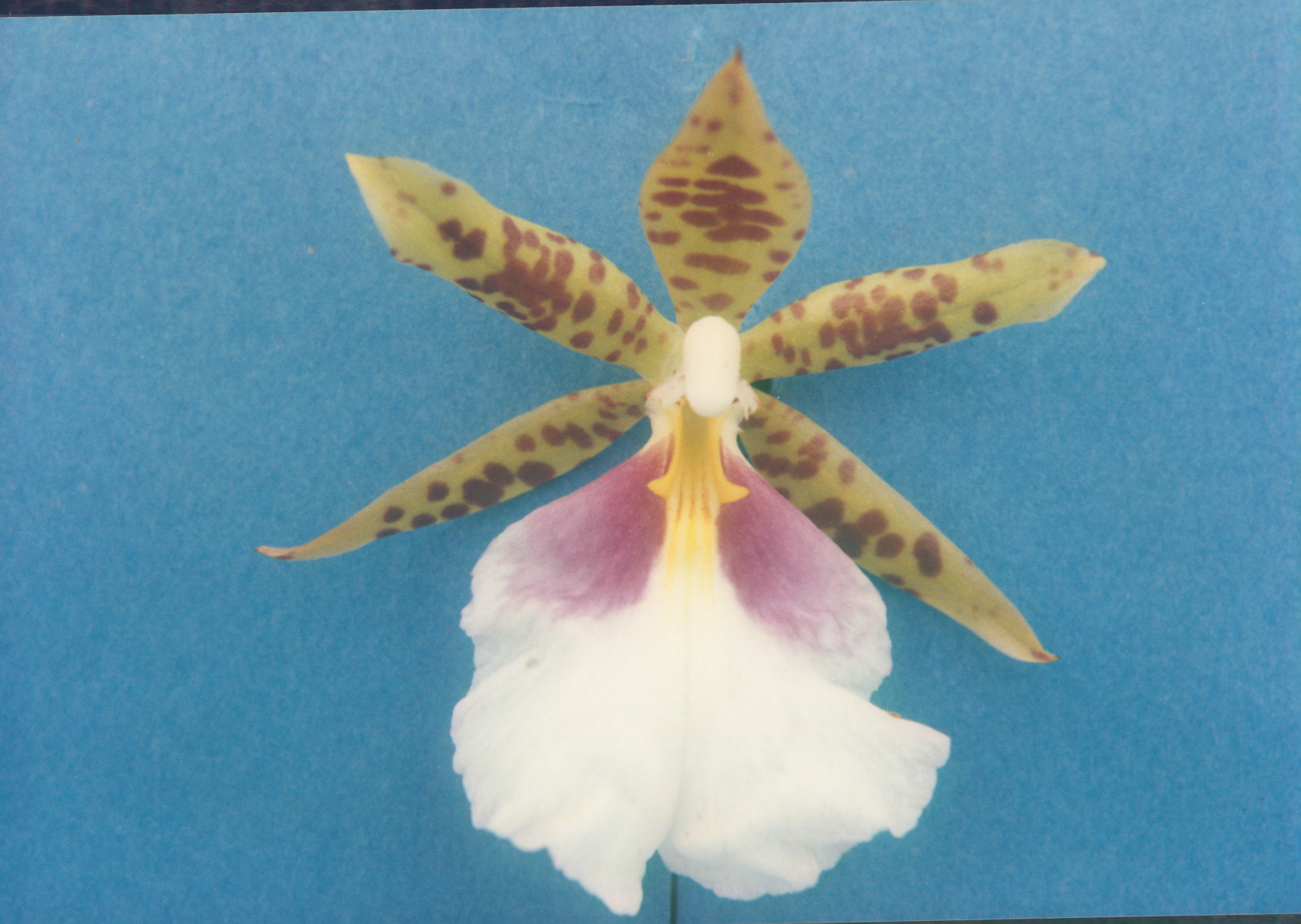
Tiger-like Trichocentrum, Trichocentrum tigrinum

As of October 2025, Plants of the World Online accepted the following species and hybrids:

- Trichocentrum aguirrei (Königer) M.W.Chase & N.H.Williams
- Trichocentrum albococcineum Linden
- Trichocentrum allenii (Kolan. & Szlach.) J.M.H.Shaw
- Trichocentrum andreanum (Cogn.) R.Jiménez & Carnevali
- Trichocentrum andrewsiae (R.Jiménez & Carnevali) R.Jiménez & Carnevali
- Trichocentrum ascendens (Lindl.) M.W.Chase & N.H.Williams
- Trichocentrum auricula (Vell.) Meneguzzo & M.W.Chase
- Trichocentrum aurisasinorum (Standl. & L.O.Williams) M.W.Chase & N.H.Williams
- Trichocentrum ayacuchense J.M.H.Shaw
- Trichocentrum bellanianum (Königer) J.M.H.Shaw
- Trichocentrum bicallosum (Lindl.) M.W.Chase & N.H.Williams
- Trichocentrum binotii (Pabst) J.M.H.Shaw
- Trichocentrum biorbiculare (Balam & Cetzal) R.Jiménez & Solano
- Trichocentrum brachyceras Schltr.
- Trichocentrum brachyphyllum (Lindl.) R.Jiménez
- Trichocentrum brenesii Schltr.
- Trichocentrum brevicalcaratum C.Schweinf.
- Trichocentrum caatingaense (Cetzal, V.P.Castro & Marçal) J.M.H.Shaw
- Trichocentrum caloceras Endrés & Rchb.f.
- Trichocentrum candidum Lindl.
- Trichocentrum capistratum Linden & Rchb.f.
- Trichocentrum × carbonoi (Yepes-Rapelo & Cetzal) J.M.H.Shaw
- Trichocentrum carthagenense (Jacq.) M.W.Chase & N.H.Williams
- Trichocentrum cavendishianum (Bateman) M.W.Chase & N.H.Williams
- Trichocentrum cayennense (Sambin & Chiron) Meneguzzo & M.W.Chase
- Trichocentrum cebolleta (Jacq.) M.W.Chase & N.H.Williams
- Trichocentrum cepula (Hoffmanns.) J.M.H.Shaw
- Trichocentrum christensonianum (Kolan. & Szlach.) J.M.H.Shaw
- Trichocentrum chrysops (Rchb.f.) Soto Arenas & R.Jiménez
- Trichocentrum × cicyi (Cetzal & Carnevali) J.M.H.Shaw
- Trichocentrum cosymbephorum (C.Morren) R.Jiménez & Carnevali
- Trichocentrum crispiflorum (Schltr.) Bogarín
- Trichocentrum × crispiluridum (Cetzal, N.Cash-Arcía & E.Mó) J.M.H.Shaw
- Trichocentrum croatii (Kolan. & Szlach.) J.M.H.Shaw
- Trichocentrum croizatii (Cetzal & Carnevali) J.M.H.Shaw
- Trichocentrum cymbiglossum Pupulin
- Trichocentrum dianthum Pupulin & Mora-Ret.
- Trichocentrum divaricatum (Lindl.) Meneguzzo & M.W.Chase
- Trichocentrum edwallii (Cogn.) Meneguzzo & M.W.Chase
- Trichocentrum estrellense Pupulin & J.B.García
- Trichocentrum flavovirens (L.O.Williams) M.W.Chase & N.H.Williams
- Trichocentrum × francoi (Cetzal & Carnevali) J.M.H.Shaw
- Trichocentrum fuscum Lindl.
- Trichocentrum × haematochilum (Lindl. & Paxton) M.W.Chase & N.H.Williams
- Trichocentrum helicanthum (Kraenzl.) J.M.H.Shaw
- Trichocentrum hians (Lindl.) Meneguzzo & M.W.Chase
- Trichocentrum hoegei Rchb.f.
- Trichocentrum ilhagrandense (V.P.Castro & G.F.Carr) Meneguzzo & M.W.Chase
- Trichocentrum ionopthalmum Rchb.f.
- Trichocentrum johnii (Oppenheim) M.W.Chase & N.H.Williams
- Trichocentrum jonesianum (Rchb.f.) M.W.Chase & N.H.Williams
- Trichocentrum lacerum (Lindl.) J.M.H.Shaw
- Trichocentrum lanceanum (Lindl.) M.W.Chase & N.H.Williams
- Trichocentrum leeanum Rchb.f.
- Trichocentrum leptotifolium (Cetzal & Carnevali) R.Jiménez & Solano
- Trichocentrum lindenii (Brongn.) M.W.Chase & N.H.Williams
- Trichocentrum × lindeoerstedii (Cetzal & Carnevali) J.M.H.Shaw
- Trichocentrum longicalcaratum Rolfe
- Trichocentrum longifolium (Lindl.) R.Jiménez
- Trichocentrum lowii (Rolfe) M.W.Chase & N.H.Williams
- Trichocentrum loyolicum Pupulin, Karremans & G.Merino
- Trichocentrum luridum (Lindl.) M.W.Chase & N.H.Williams
- Trichocentrum × lurigenense (Cetzal & Carnevali) J.M.H.Shaw
- Trichocentrum × lurilindenii (Carnevali & Cetzal) J.M.H.Shaw
- Trichocentrum macrocebolletum (Cetzal & Carnevali) J.M.H.Shaw
- Trichocentrum margalefii (Hágsater) M.W.Chase & N.H.Williams
- Trichocentrum × marvraganii (Lückel) M.W.Chase & N.H.Williams
- Trichocentrum micranthum (Kraenzl.) Meneguzzo & M.W.Chase
- Trichocentrum microchilum (Bateman ex Lindl.) M.W.Chase & N.H.Williams
- Trichocentrum mirabile (Rchb.f.) Meneguzzo & M.W.Chase
- Trichocentrum moreniorum Pupulin & Mor.-Pareja
- Trichocentrum morenoi (Dodson & Luer) M.W.Chase & N.H.Williams
- Trichocentrum nanum (Lindl.) M.W.Chase & N.H.Williams
- Trichocentrum natalieae (Balam & Carnevali) R.Jiménez & Solano
- Trichocentrum neudeckeri Königer
- Trichocentrum nudum (Bateman ex Lindl.) M.W.Chase & N.H.Williams
- Trichocentrum obcordilabium Pupulin
- Trichocentrum oerstedii (Rchb.f.) R.Jiménez & Carnevali
- Trichocentrum × oersteluridum (Cetzal & Balam) J.M.H.Shaw
- Trichocentrum oestlundianum (L.O.Williams) M.W.Chase & N.H.Williams
- Trichocentrum orthoplectron Rchb.f.
- Trichocentrum panduratum C.Schweinf.
- Trichocentrum paniculatum (Brade) Meneguzzo & M.W.Chase
- Trichocentrum pendulum (Carnevali & Cetzal) R.Jiménez & Solano
- Trichocentrum perezii Beutelsp.
- Trichocentrum pfavii Rchb.f.
- Trichocentrum pohlianum (Cogn.) M.W.Chase & N.H.Williams
- Trichocentrum popowianum Königer
- Trichocentrum porphyrio Rchb.f.
- Trichocentrum pulchrum Poepp. & Endl.
- Trichocentrum pumilum (Lindl.) M.W.Chase & N.H.Williams
- Trichocentrum pupulinianum Bogarín & Karremans
- Trichocentrum purpureum Lindl. ex Rchb.f.
- Trichocentrum × quintanarooense (Cetzal & Carnevali) J.M.H.Shaw
- Trichocentrum recurvum Lindl.
- Trichocentrum schrautianum (Königer) J.M.H.Shaw
- Trichocentrum schunkeanum (Campacci & Cath.) Meneguzzo & M.W.Chase
- Trichocentrum schwambachiae (V.P.Castro & Toscano) Meneguzzo
- Trichocentrum sierracaracolense (Cetzal & Balam) R.Jiménez & Solano
- Trichocentrum silverarum (Carnevali & Cetzal) J.M.H.Shaw
- Trichocentrum splendidum (A.Rich. ex Duch.) M.W.Chase & N.H.Williams
- Trichocentrum sprucei (Lindl.) M.W.Chase & N.H.Williams
- Trichocentrum stacyi (Garay) M.W.Chase & N.H.Williams
- Trichocentrum stramineum (Bateman ex Lindl.) M.W.Chase & N.H.Williams
- Trichocentrum tapiae (Balam & Carnevali) J.M.H.Shaw
- Trichocentrum × teaboanum (R.Jiménez, Carnevali & J.L.Tapia) R.Jiménez & Carnevali
- Trichocentrum tenuiflorum Lindl.
- Trichocentrum tigrinum Linden & Rchb.f.
- Trichocentrum ultrajectinum (Pulle) J.M.H.Shaw
- Trichocentrum undulatum (Sw.) Ackerman & M.W.Chase
- Trichocentrum viridulum Pupulin
- Trichocentrum yucatanense (Cetzal & Carnevali) R.Jiménez & Solano
- Trichocentrum yuroaense (Kolan. & Szlach.) J.M.H.Shaw

== In horticulture ==
Trichocentrum species are highly appreciated by orchid growers; some consider them to be among the most beautiful orchids on earth. Culture of members of this genus is highly variable, ranging from the drought-tolerant and easy-to-grow T. tigrinum to smaller and more delicate species.

In cultivation they are subject to rot unless provided with conditions similar to those they experience in the wild. Extensive research into the ecological profiles of individual species may be required to achieve success cultivating them. Many species from Central America apparently endure a prolonged drought for at least part of the year, and have developed succulent leaves to deal with these conditions. Plants may shrivel quite severely without long-lasting injury.

== Chemistry and use as entheogen ==
The Central and South American species Trichocentrum cebolleta (known formerly as Oncidium cebolleta) has been found to contain a variety of phenanthrenoids. This species is of considerable ethnobotanical interest as one of only a handful of orchids reported to be used as an entheogens. T. cebolleta is used as a substitute for hikuli a.k.a. peyote (the hallucinogenic cactus Lophophora williamsii) by the Tarahumara of Northern Mexico - a tribe noted for the large number of hallucinogenic plants which it uses in various shamanic and running-related practices. The combination of phenanthrenoid content and employment as entheogens in shamanic practices is to be found also in the Asiatic orchids Vanda tessellata and Dendrobium macraei (- known formerly as Ephemerantha macraei and Flickingeria macraei - see page Flickingeria). The orchidaceous genera Trichocentrum, Vanda and Dendrobium are all members of the subfamily Epidendroideae and are also placed currently in the subgroup/clade of Higher Epidendroids within the subfamily. Stermitz et al., however, do not report any evidence or suggest that the phenanthrenoids from Trichocentrum possess psychoactive properties.
