= Libor (disambiguation) =

Libor is the London interbank offered rate.

Libor may also refer to:

- Libor (name), Czech masculine given name
- Ullrich Libor, German sailor

== See also ==
- Liborius (disambiguation)
