= × Trichocidium =

Scientific classification
- Kingdom: Plantae
- Clade: Tracheophytes
- Clade: Angiosperms
- Clade: Monocots
- Order: Asparagales
- Family: Orchidaceae
- Subfamily: Epidendroideae
- Tribe: Cymbidieae
- Subtribe: Oncidiinae
- Genus: × Trichocidium hort.

Genus of flowering plants

× Trichocidium, abbreviated as Trcdm. in the horticultural trade, is the orchid nothogenus comprising intergeneric hybrids of the two orchid genera Oncidium and Trichocentrum (Onc. x Trctm.).
