= Trichocentrum andreanum =

Scientific classification
- Kingdom: Plantae
- Clade: Embryophytes
- Clade: Tracheophytes
- Clade: Spermatophytes
- Clade: Angiosperms
- Clade: Monocots
- Order: Asparagales
- Family: Orchidaceae
- Subfamily: Epidendroideae
- Genus: Trichocentrum
- Species: T. andreanum

Binomial name
- Trichocentrum andreanum (Cogn.) R.Jiménez & Carnevali

Synonyms
- Lophiaris andreana (Cogn.) R.Jiménez & Carnevali; Oncidium andreanum (Cogn.) Garay; Oncidium carthagenense var. andreanum Cogn.

Species of orchid

Trichocentrum andreanum is a species of orchid native to Mexico.
