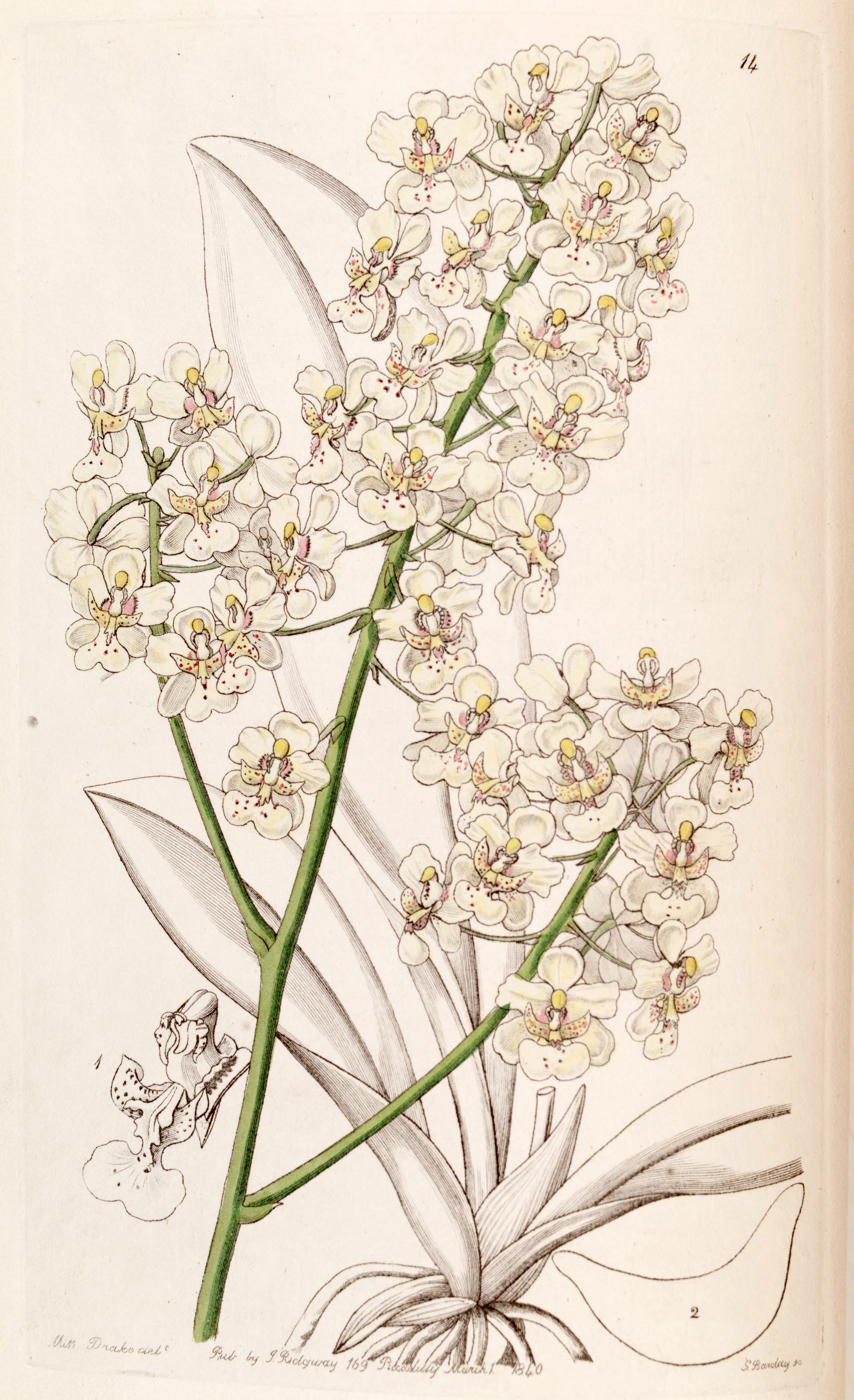
- Trichocentrum stramineum illustration

Scientific classification
- Kingdom: Plantae
- Clade: Tracheophytes
- Clade: Angiosperms
- Clade: Monocots
- Order: Asparagales
- Family: Orchidaceae
- Subfamily: Epidendroideae
- Genus: Trichocentrum
- Species: T. stramineum

Binomial name
- Trichocentrum stramineum (Bateman ex Lindl.) M.W.Chase & N.H.Williams

Synonyms
- Oncidium stramineum Bateman ex Lindl. (basionym); Oncidium saltator Lem.; Oncidium columbae Rchb. ex Lindl.; Oncidium arietinum Kraenzl.; Lophiaris straminea (Bateman ex Lindl.) Braem

= Trichocentrum stramineum =

Species of orchid

Trichocentrum stramineum is a species of orchid endemic to Mexico (Veracruz).
