= Porsch =

Porsch is a variant of the German language surname Borsch. Notable people with the name include:

- Andrea Porsch (1959), Austrian field hockey player
- Felix Porsch (1853–1930), German politician
- Manfred Porsch (1950), Austrian composer
- Otto Porsch (1875–1959), Austrian biologist
- Peter Porsch (1944), German academic and politician
