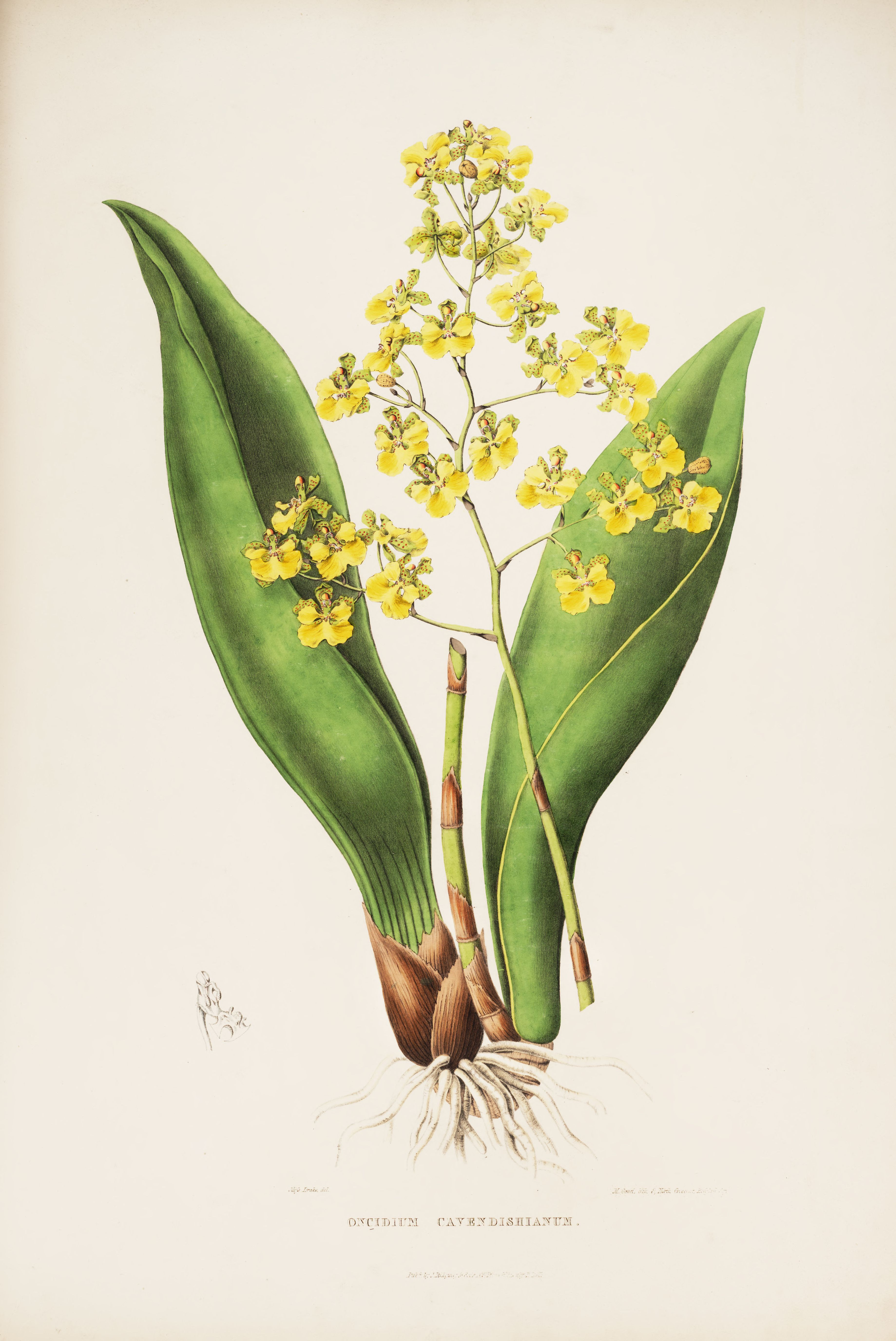
- Illustration of Trichocentrum cavendishianum

Scientific classification
- Kingdom: Plantae
- Clade: Tracheophytes
- Clade: Angiosperms
- Clade: Monocots
- Order: Asparagales
- Family: Orchidaceae
- Subfamily: Epidendroideae
- Genus: Trichocentrum
- Species: T. cavendishianum

Binomial name
- Trichocentrum cavendishianum (Bateman) M.W.Chase & N.H.Williams

Synonyms
- Oncidium cavendishianum Bateman (basionym); Oncidium pachyphyllum Hook.; Lophiaris cavendishiana (Bateman) Braem; Lophiaris pachyphylla (Hook.) R.Jiménez & Carnevali; Trichocentrum pachyphyllum (Hook.) R.Jiménez & Carnevali

= Trichocentrum cavendishianum =

Species of orchid

Trichocentrum cavendishianum is a species of orchid found in Mexico, Guatemala, El Salvador, and Honduras.
