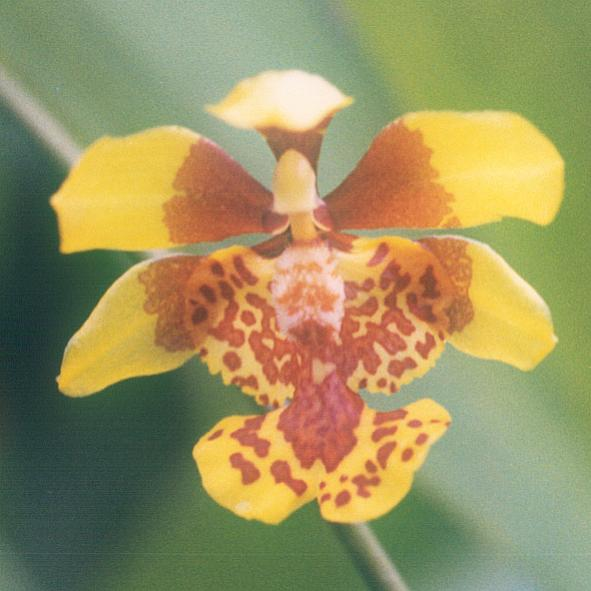

Scientific classification
- Kingdom: Plantae
- Clade: Tracheophytes
- Clade: Angiosperms
- Clade: Monocots
- Order: Asparagales
- Family: Orchidaceae
- Subfamily: Epidendroideae
- Genus: Trichocentrum
- Species: T. divaricatum

Binomial name
- Trichocentrum divaricatum (Lindl.) Meneguzzo & M.W.Chase

Synonyms
- Aurinocidium divaricatum (Lindl.) Romowicz & Szlach.; Aurinocidium pulvinatum (Lindl.) Romowicz & Szlach.; Aurinocidium robustissimum (Rchb.f.) Romowicz & Szlach.; Aurinocidium sphegiferum (Lindl.) Romowicz & Szlach.; Grandiphyllum divaricatum (Lindl.) Docha Neto; Grandiphyllum pulvinatum (Lindl.) Docha Neto; Grandiphyllum robustissimum (Rchb.f.) Docha Neto; Grandiphyllum sphegiferum (Lindl.) Docha Neto; Oncidium divaricatum Lindl.; Oncidium divaricatum var. cupreum Lindl.; Oncidium pulvinatum Lindl.; Oncidium pulvinatum var. grandiflorum Regel; Oncidium pulvinatum var. majus B.S.Williams; Oncidium pulvinatum var. minarum Hoehne & Schltr.; Oncidium robustissimum Rchb.f.; Oncidium sciurus Scheidw.; Oncidium sphegiferum Lindl.

= Trichocentrum divaricatum =

Species of orchid

Trichocentrum divaricatum, synonyms including Oncidium divaricatum and Grandiphyllum divaricatum, is a species of orchid found from southeastern and southern Brazil to northeastern Argentina.
