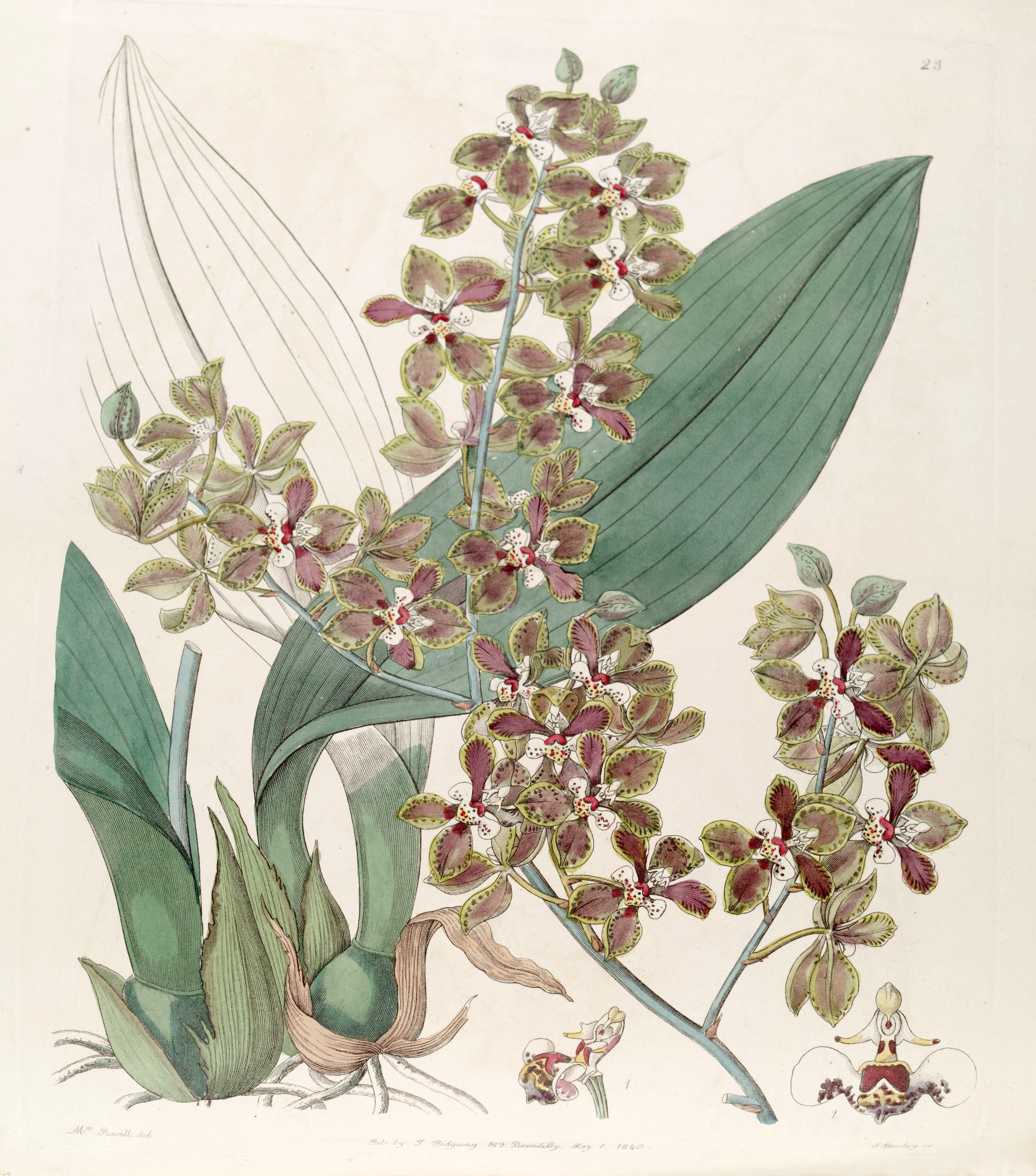
- Trichocentrum microchilum illustration

Scientific classification
- Kingdom: Plantae
- Clade: Tracheophytes
- Clade: Angiosperms
- Clade: Monocots
- Order: Asparagales
- Family: Orchidaceae
- Subfamily: Epidendroideae
- Genus: Trichocentrum
- Species: T. microchilum

Binomial name
- Trichocentrum microchilum (Bateman ex Lindl.) M.W.Chase & N.H.Williams

Synonyms
- Oncidium microchilum Bateman ex Lindl. (basionym); Oncidium funckii Lubbers; Lophiaris microchila (Bateman ex Lindl.) Senghas

= Trichocentrum microchilum =

Species of orchid

Trichocentrum microchilum is a species of orchid found in Mexico, Guatemala, El Salvador, and Honduras.
