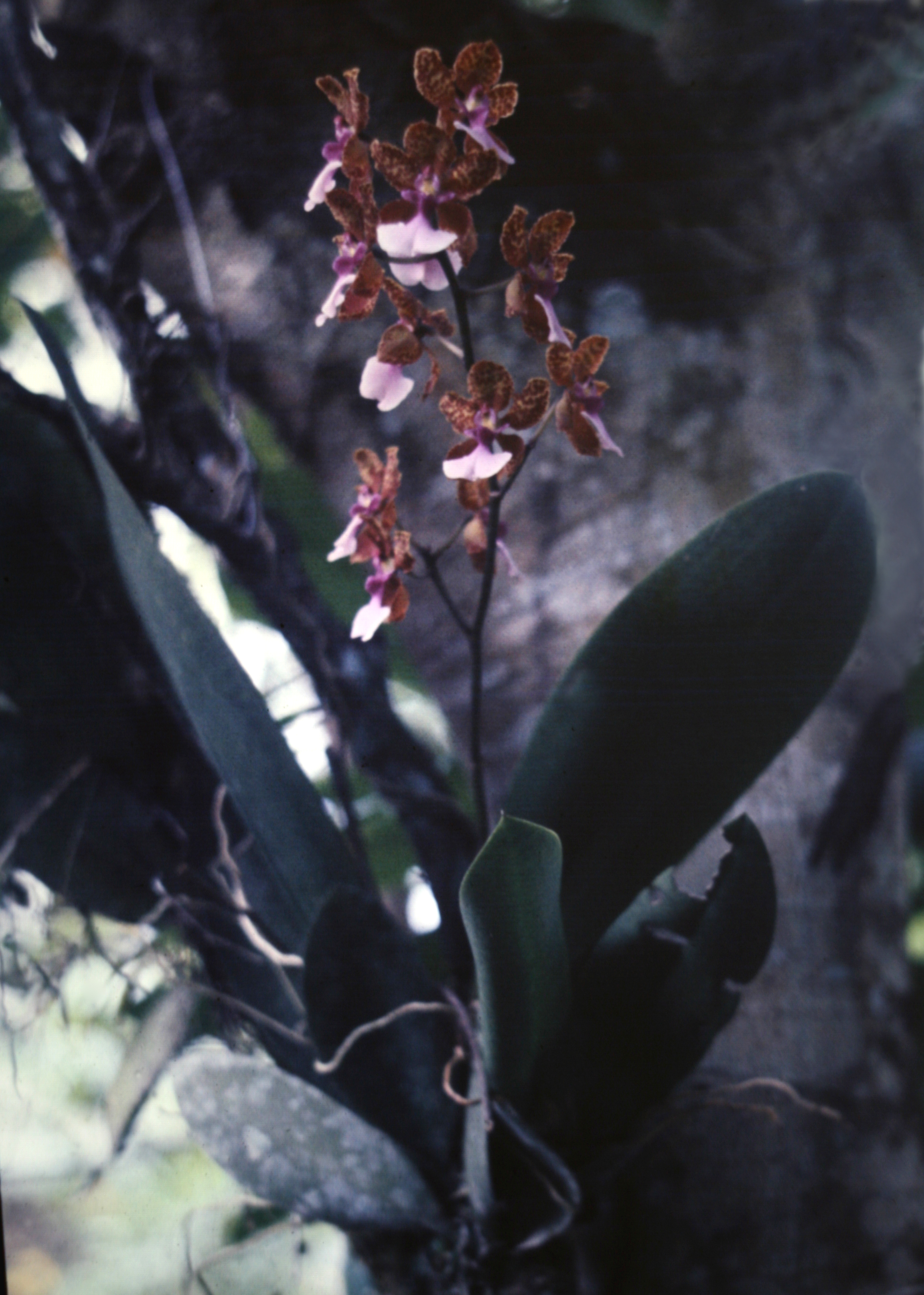

Scientific classification
- Kingdom: Plantae
- Clade: Tracheophytes
- Clade: Angiosperms
- Clade: Monocots
- Order: Asparagales
- Family: Orchidaceae
- Subfamily: Epidendroideae
- Genus: Trichocentrum
- Species: T. lanceanum

Binomial name
- Trichocentrum lanceanum (Lindl.) M.W.Chase & N.H.Williams

Synonyms
- Oncidium lanceanum Lindl. (basionym); Lophiaris fragrans Raf.; Lophiaris lanceana (Lindl.) Braem

= Trichocentrum lanceanum =

Species of orchid

Trichocentrum lanceanum is a species of orchid found from Trinidad to southern tropical America.
