= Trichocentrum carthagenense =

- Illustration of Trichocentrum carthagenense

Scientific classification
- Kingdom: Plantae
- Clade: Tracheophytes
- Clade: Angiosperms
- Clade: Monocots
- Order: Asparagales
- Family: Orchidaceae
- Subfamily: Epidendroideae
- Genus: Trichocentrum
- Species: T. carthagenense

Binomial name
- Trichocentrum carthagenense (Jacq.) M.W.Chase & N.H.Williams

Synonyms
- Epidendrum carthagenense Jacq. (basionym); Cymbidium undulatum Sw.; Epidendrum crispum Lam.; Lophiaris carthagenensis (Jacq.) Braem; Lophiaris oerstedii (Rchb.f.) R.Jiménez & Carnevali & Dressler; Oncidium carthagenense (Jacq.) Sw.; Oncidium carthagenense var. klotzschii Lindl.; Oncidium carthagenense var. sanguineum (Lindl.) Lindl.; Oncidium carthagenense var. swartzii Lindl.; Oncidium guttatum var. roseum Lindl.; Oncidium henchmannii (Knowles & Westc.) Lodd.; Oncidium huntianum Hook.; Oncidium huntleyanum Beer ex Lindl.; Oncidium kymatoides Kraenzl.; Oncidium luridum var. henchmannii Knowles & Westc.; Oncidium obsoletum Galeotti ex Lindl.; Oncidium oerstedii var. crispiflorum Schltr.; Oncidium panduriferum Kunth; Oncidium roseum Lodd.; Oncidium salvadorense Schltr.; Oncidium sanguineum Lindl.; Oncidium sanguineum var. roseum Regel

Species of orchid

Trichocentrum carthagenense, also known as the Coot Bay dancing lady orchid, is a species of orchid found from the Everglades, the Caribbean and Mexico, Central America and down to northern Brazil. The species name refers to the Cartagena, Colombia, where it was first collected in 1760.
