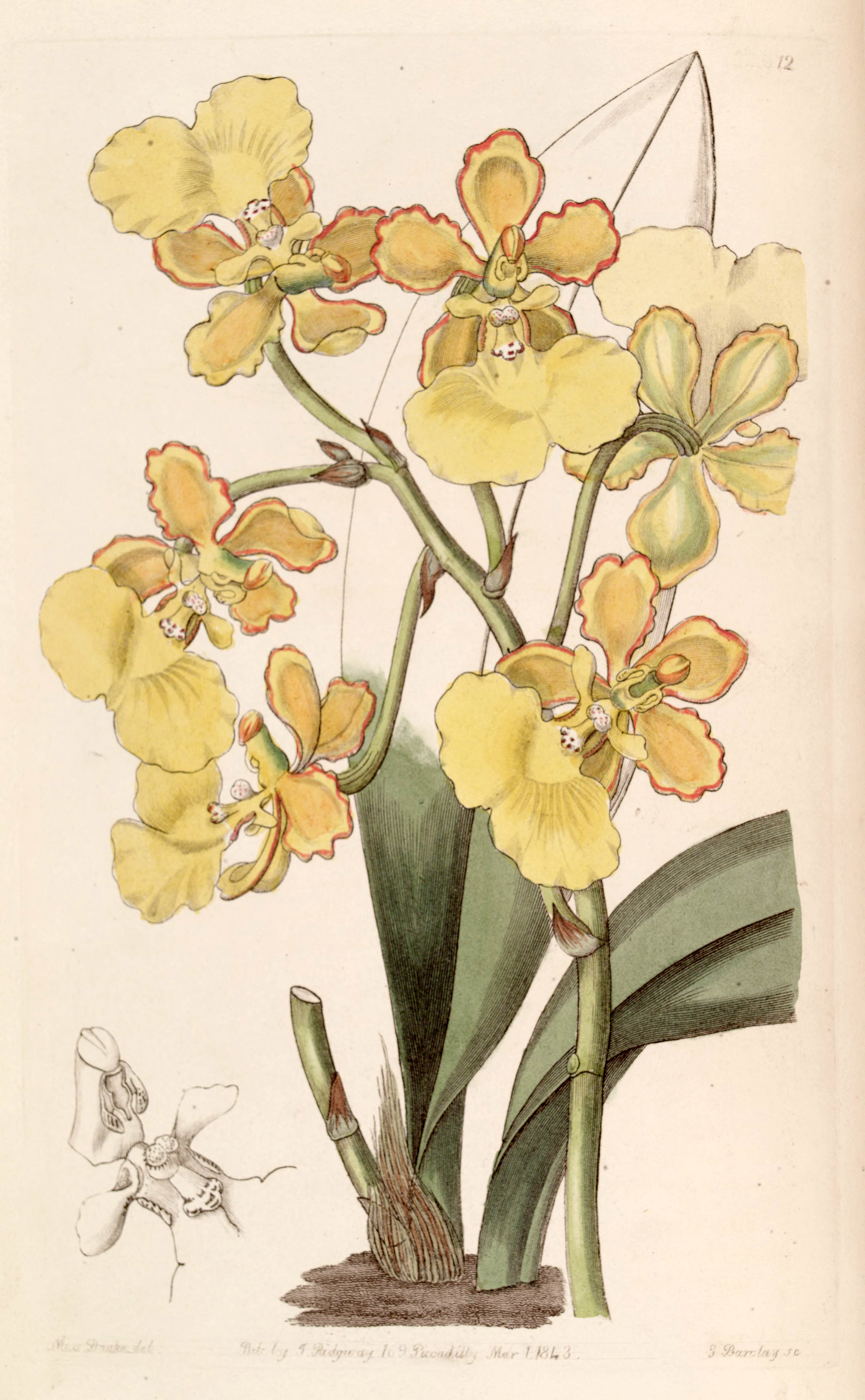
- Illustration of Trichocentrum bicallosum

Scientific classification
- Kingdom: Plantae
- Clade: Tracheophytes
- Clade: Angiosperms
- Clade: Monocots
- Order: Asparagales
- Family: Orchidaceae
- Subfamily: Epidendroideae
- Genus: Trichocentrum
- Species: T. bicallosum

Binomial name
- Trichocentrum bicallosum (Lindl.) M.W.Chase & N.H.Williams

Synonyms
- Oncidium bicallosum Lindl. (basionym); Lophiaris bicallosa (Lindl.) Braem

= Trichocentrum bicallosum =

Species of orchid

Trichocentrum bicallosum is a species of orchid found in Mexico, Guatemala, El Salvador, and Honduras.
