= Manfred Porsch =

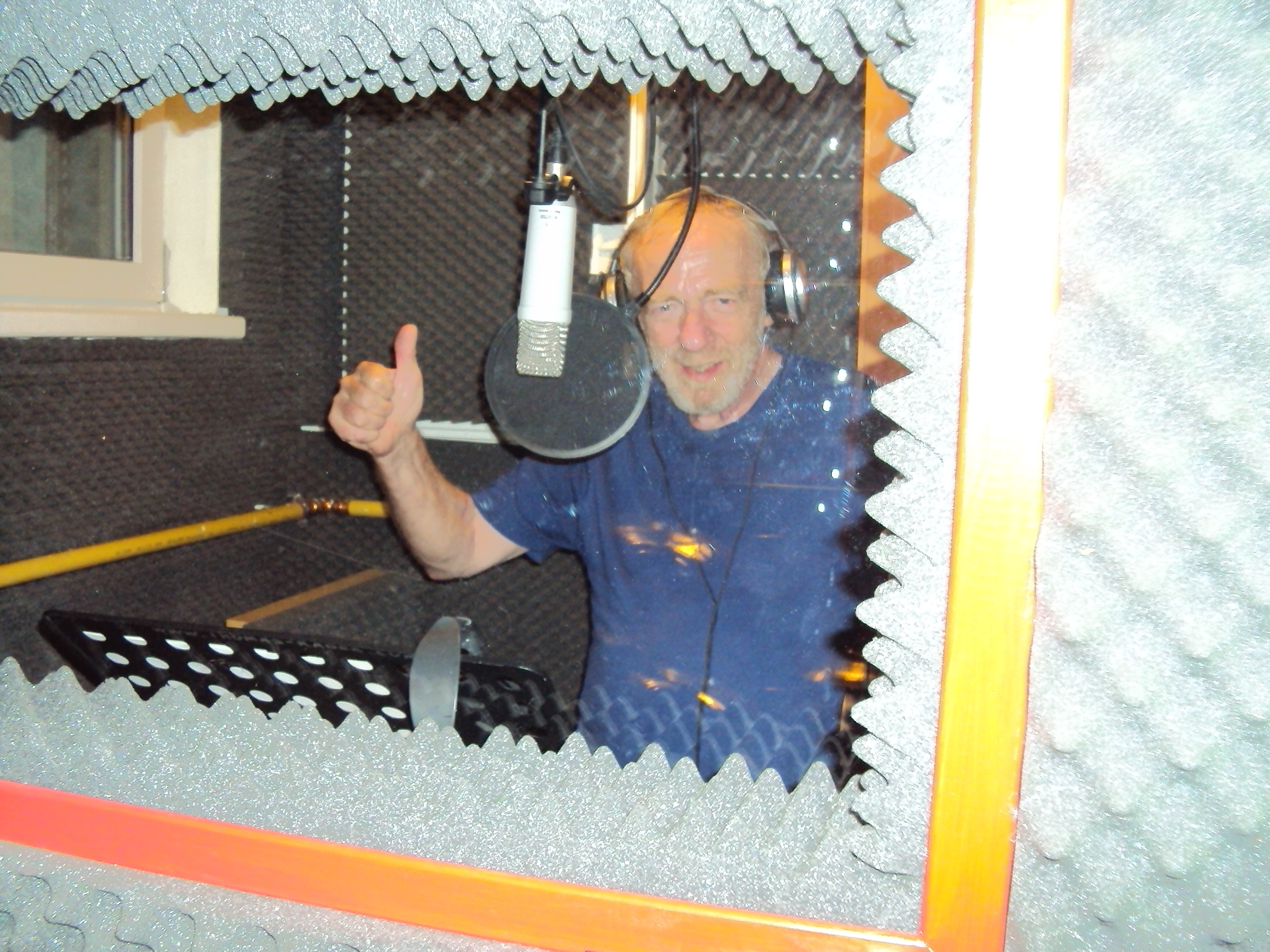
Manfred Porsch at Studio from RATOM-Edition

Manfred Maria Porsch (born 14 April 1950 in Vienna) is a composer of Austrian contemporary worship music and a teacher.

Manfred Porsch comes from the Focolare Movement. In 1971 and 1972 he toured with Gen Rosso. In 1983 he won the first prize at the "World Festival of the Religious Song", the "Rassegna Mondiale della Canzone Religiosa Populare" in Rom. In 1987 Porsch founded "Musica e Vita Österreich" and initiated the festival series "Fest der Lieder". He published about 200 songs on more than 20 albums. After a long musical break, in 2012 Porsch published new songs together with the producer Thomas Raber.

== Songs ==
- Melchior
- Wer schweigt, stimmt zu
- Messe (Ein Fest der Freude)
- Der Geist des Herrn ruht auf mir
- Du bist das Licht auf dem Weg
- Singen wir des Lied vom Frieden (produced by Thomas Raber, RATOM-Edition 2012)
- Eine Schule für coole (produced by Thomas Raber, RATOM-Edition 2012)
