= Pierre Étienne Simon Duchartre =

French botanist (1811-1894)

Pierre Étienne Simon Duchartre (27 October 1811, Portiragnes – 5 November 1894, Meudon) was a French botanist.

He studied biology in Toulouse, where after graduation he worked as a teacher. In 1836 he edited and published the exsiccata Flore Pyrénéenne. From 1837 he taught classes in Fumel, several years later moving to Paris, where in 1848 he was accepted by the faculty of sciences. During the following year, he was appointed a professor of botany and plant physiology at the Institut agronomique in Versailles. In 1861 he attained the chair of botany at the Sorbonne.

In 1854 he was co-founder of the Société Botanique de France, an institution in which he served as president on several separate occasions.

In 1850 he experimented with sulfur as a remedy against powdery mildew, a fungus that had a serious negative impact on European grapes during the mid-19th century. The genus Duchartrea (family Gesneriaceae) was named in his honor by botanist Joseph Decaisne. He is the binomial author of many species from the botanical family Aristolochiaceae.

== Honors and Awards ==
Officer of the Order of Legion of Honour

== Principal works ==
- Observations anatomiques et organogéniques sur la clandestine d'Europe (Lathraea clandestina, L.), 1847 - Anatomic and organogenic observations of Lathraea clandestina.
- Famille des Aristolochiées, 1854 - Aristolochiaceae.
- Éléments de botanique : comprenant l'anatomie, l'organographie, la physiologie des plantes, les familles naturelles et la géographie botanique, 1867 - Elements of botany, etc.
- Rapport sur les progrés de la botanique physiologique, 1868 - Report involving progress in plant physiology.
- Observations sur les bulbes des lis, 1873 - Observations involving lily bulbs.
