= Libor Zábranský =

Libor Zábranský may refer to:

- Libor Zábranský (ice hockey, born 1973), Czech ice hockey player, father of the younger Libor.
- Libor Zábranský (ice hockey, born 2000), Czech ice hockey player, son of the elder Libor.
