= Libor Nováček =

Czech pianist

Libor Novacek (born 1978) is a Czech pianist. He has gained international reputation for his interpretations of the works of Brahms and Liszt, which despite his young age have already been compared to those of the great masters such as Kempff and Arrau and said to possess ‘exceptional poetic verve and inwardness’. His popularity grew greatly upon winning the Landor Records 2005 Competition, whereupon he established a long-term recording contract with Landor and proceeded to release two CDs in 2006 to outstanding reviews in the classical music press including BBC Music Magazine, International Record Review, Pianonews, Crescendo, Rondo and "Editor’s Choice" in Gramophone Music Magazine for his Liszt CD featuring Années de pèlerinage – Italie and Mephisto Waltz No.1. In October 2007, this same CD was awarded the 'Diplom d’Honneur' by the prestigious Ferenc Liszt Society in Budapest. Novacek's latest CD, released in September 2008 and featuring works by Brahms, continues to gather exultant reviews, including 5 stars and "Instrumental Choice" in BBC Music Magazine.

Libor graduated from the Guildhall School of Music and Drama in 2004 with the highest awards and was selected for representation by YCAT in the same year. He has won several international prizes. His concerts and tours have taken him to major festivals and venues worldwide, including the Brighton, Ryedale, North Aldeborough, Chester, 3 Choirs Festivals and the Mostly Mozart Festival, the Wigmore Hall, the Barbican, the United States, Mexico, South America, Spain, France, Germany, the Czech Republic, Hungary, India, South Africa, Kenya and Zimbabwe. He has worked regularly with the Czechoslovak Chamber Orchestra. More recently, he has performed with the Royal Philharmonic Orchestra, the Prague Philharmonia, the Prague Chamber Orchestra, Hamburg Symphony Orchestra, Bohuslav Martinů Philharmony, Südwestfälische Symphony Orchestra, Brighton Philharmonic Orchestra, English Sinfonia, and the European Union Chamber Orchestra. He has also recorded for Czech Radio and BBC Radio 3.
