= Anton Börsch =

Anton Börsch (1854, Kassel – 1920, Bad Wildungen) was a German geodesist, astronomer, and geophysicist.

Börsch was a professor at the Geodätisches Institut Potsdam. In 1904 Börsch was an Invited Speaker of the ICM in Heidelberg.

== Selected publications ==
- as editor and translator with P. Simon: Abhandlungen zur Methode der kleinsten Quadrate. Berlin. 1887; authored by Carl Friedrich Gauss in Latin and translated into German by Börsch and Simon
- with Louis Krüger: Börsch, Anton; Krüger, Louis (1902). Geodätische Linien südlich der Europäischen Längengradmessung in 52 Grad Breite. Berlin.
- Astronomisch-geodätisches Netz 1. Ordnung nördlich der europäischen Längengradmessung in 52 Grad Breite. Berlin. 1906.
- Verbindung der russisch-skandinavischen Breitengradmessung mit dem astronomisch-geodätischen Netz in Norddeutschland. Berlin. 1909.
