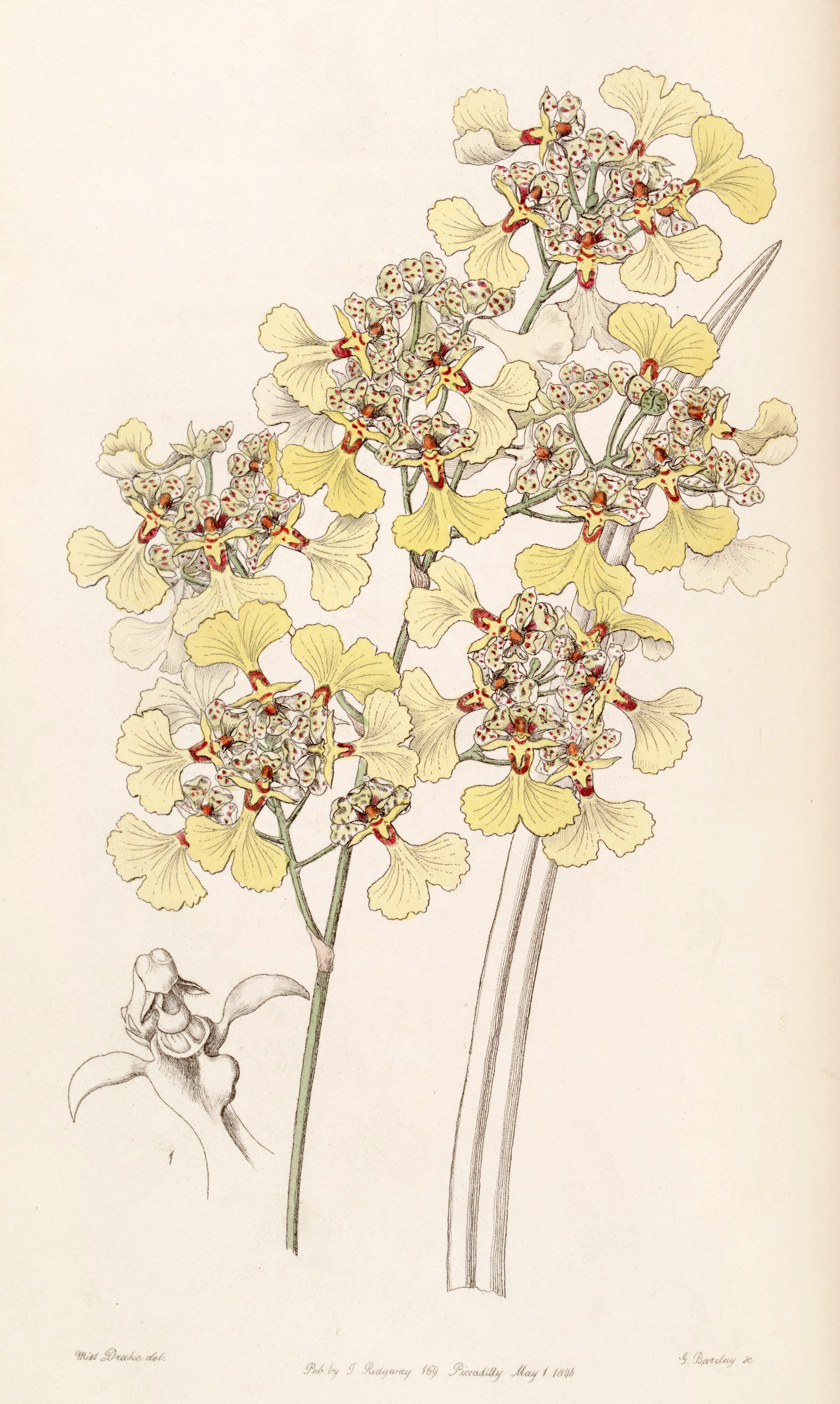
- Illustration of Trichocentrum lacerum

Scientific classification
- Kingdom: Plantae
- Clade: Tracheophytes
- Clade: Angiosperms
- Clade: Monocots
- Order: Asparagales
- Family: Orchidaceae
- Subfamily: Epidendroideae
- Genus: Trichocentrum
- Species: T. lacerum

Binomial name
- Trichocentrum lacerum Lindl. ined.

Synonyms
- Oncidium lacerum Lindl. (basionym); Oncidium stipitatum Lindl.; Oncidium stipitatum var. platyonyx Rchb.f.; Stilifolium stipitatum (Lindl.) Königer & D.Pongratz; Cohniella stipitata (Lindl.) Christenson; Trichocentrum stipitatum (Lindl.) M.W.Chase & N.H.Williams; Trichocentrum nudum ssp. stipitatum (Lindl.) Dressler & N.H.Williams; Cohniella lacera (Lindl.) Cetzal

= Trichocentrum lacerum =

Species of orchid

Trichocentrum lacerum is a species of orchid endemic to Panama.
