= Liborius (disambiguation) =

Liborius of Le Mans (c. 348–397) was the second Bishop of Le Mans.

Liborius may also refer to:

== People ==
- Liborius Ndumbukuti Nashenda (born 1959), Namibian Roman Catholic archbishop
- Liborius Ritter von Frank (1848–1935) Austro-Hungarian military leader
- Liborius Wagner (1593–1631), German Catholic priest

== Other ==
- St. Liborius Church, Krasnodar, Catholic church in Krasnodar, Russia
- St. Liborius church, Rome, Italy
- St. Liborius Church and Buildings, St. Louis, Missouri, United States

== See also ==
- Libor (disambiguation)
