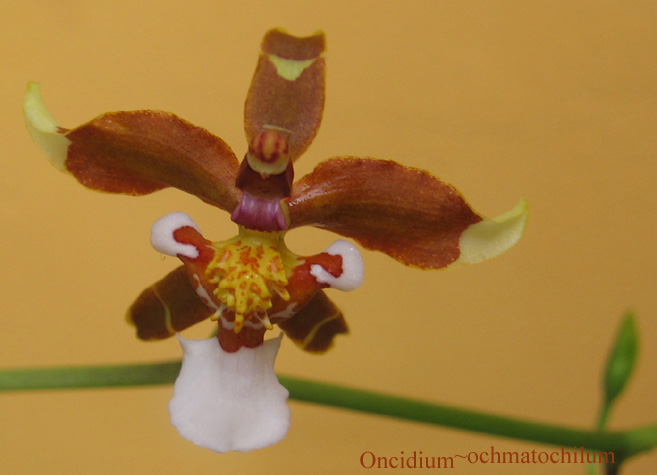

Scientific classification
- Kingdom: Plantae
- Clade: Tracheophytes
- Clade: Angiosperms
- Clade: Monocots
- Order: Asparagales
- Family: Orchidaceae
- Subfamily: Epidendroideae
- Genus: Cyrtochiloides
- Species: C. ochmatochila

Binomial name
- Cyrtochiloides ochmatochila (Rchb.f.) N.H. Williams & M.W. Chase

Synonyms
- Oncidium ochmatochilum Rchb.f.; Oncidium cardiochilum Lindl.; Odontoglossum cardiochilum (Lindl.) Kraenzl.; Oncidium chelidon Kraenzl.; Oncidium chelidonizon Kraenzl.; Cyrtochiloides cardiochila (Lindl.) N.H. Williams & M.W. Chase

= Cyrtochiloides ochmatochila =

Species of plant

Cyrtochiloides ochmatochila is a species of orchid.

The genus Cyrtochiloides N.H.Williams & M.W.Chase (2001) comprises a small group of Neotropical epiphytes, previously included under a broad concept of Oncidium Sw., with a new, more accurate identity based on DNA. Cyrtochiloides is akin to the mainly South American Cyrtochilum Kunth (1815). After having found its species scattered in Oncidium and several other genera, recently Cyrtochilum received notable acceptance by botanists, primarily based on the molecular discoveries made by Williams and Chase, as well as morphological analyses carried out by Stig Dalström. DNA samples illustrate that Oncidium ochmatochilum Rchb.f. and several other species have only a diluted connection with the core species of Oncidium. This new genus forms part of a well-supported clade including Otoglossum (Schltr.) Garay & Dunsterville, Cyrtochilum, the Andean group of Caucaea Schltr. (also previously retained under Oncidium as the section Cucullata), and Miltoniopsis God.-Leb.
