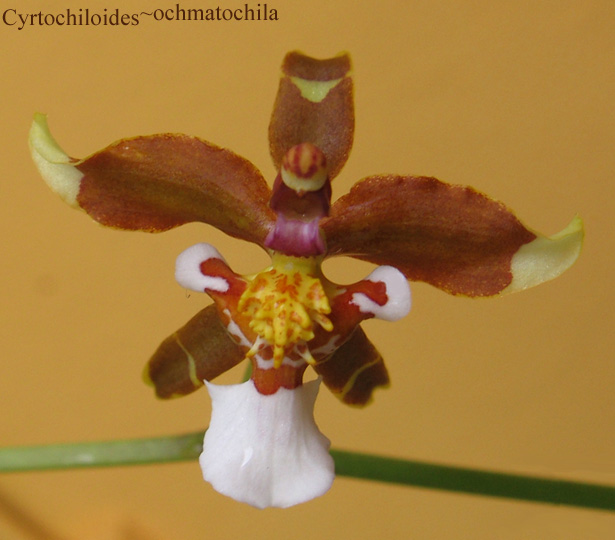
- Cyrtochiloides ochmatochila

Scientific classification
- Kingdom: Plantae
- Clade: Tracheophytes
- Clade: Angiosperms
- Clade: Monocots
- Order: Asparagales
- Family: Orchidaceae
- Subfamily: Epidendroideae
- Tribe: Cymbidieae
- Subtribe: Oncidiinae
- Genus: Cyrtochiloides; Williams & Chase, 2001

Species
- See text

= Cyrtochiloides =

Genus of orchids

Cyrtochiloides, a genus of orchids described in 2001 by Norris H. Williams and Mark W. Chase, is designed to provide a small group of Neotropical epiphytes, previously included under a broad concept of Oncidium Sw., with a new, more accurate identity based on DNA.

Cyrtochiloides is akin to the mainly South American Cyrtochilum Kunth, a genus described in 1815. After having found its species scattered in Oncidium and several other genera, recently Cyrtochilum received notable acceptance by botanists, primarily based on the molecular discoveries made by Williams and Chase, as well as morphological analyses carried out by Stig Dalström.

DNA samples illustrate that Oncidium ochmatochilum Rchb.f. and several other species have only a diluted connection with the core of the Oncidium species. This new genus forms part of a well-supported clade including Otoglossum (Schltr.) Garay & Dunsterville, Cyrtochilum, the Andean group of Caucaea Schltr. (also previously retained under Oncidium as the section Cucullata), and Miltoniopsis God.-Leb.

== Species ==
- Cyrtochiloides ochmatochila (Rchb.f.) N.H.Williams & M.W.Chase (2001) (syn. Cyrtochiloides cardiochila (Lindl.) N.H.Williams & M.W.Chase (2001))
- Cyrtochiloides panduriformis (Ames & C.Schweinf.) N.H.Williams & M.W.Chase (2001)
- Cyrtochiloides riopalenqueana (Dodson) N.H.Williams & M.W.Chase (2001)

This genus has not been accepted yet by The International Orchid Register of the Royal Horticultural Society (horticultural abbreviation : Crt).

This genus is accepted according to database World Checklist of Monocotyledons of the Royal Botanic Gardens, Kew.
