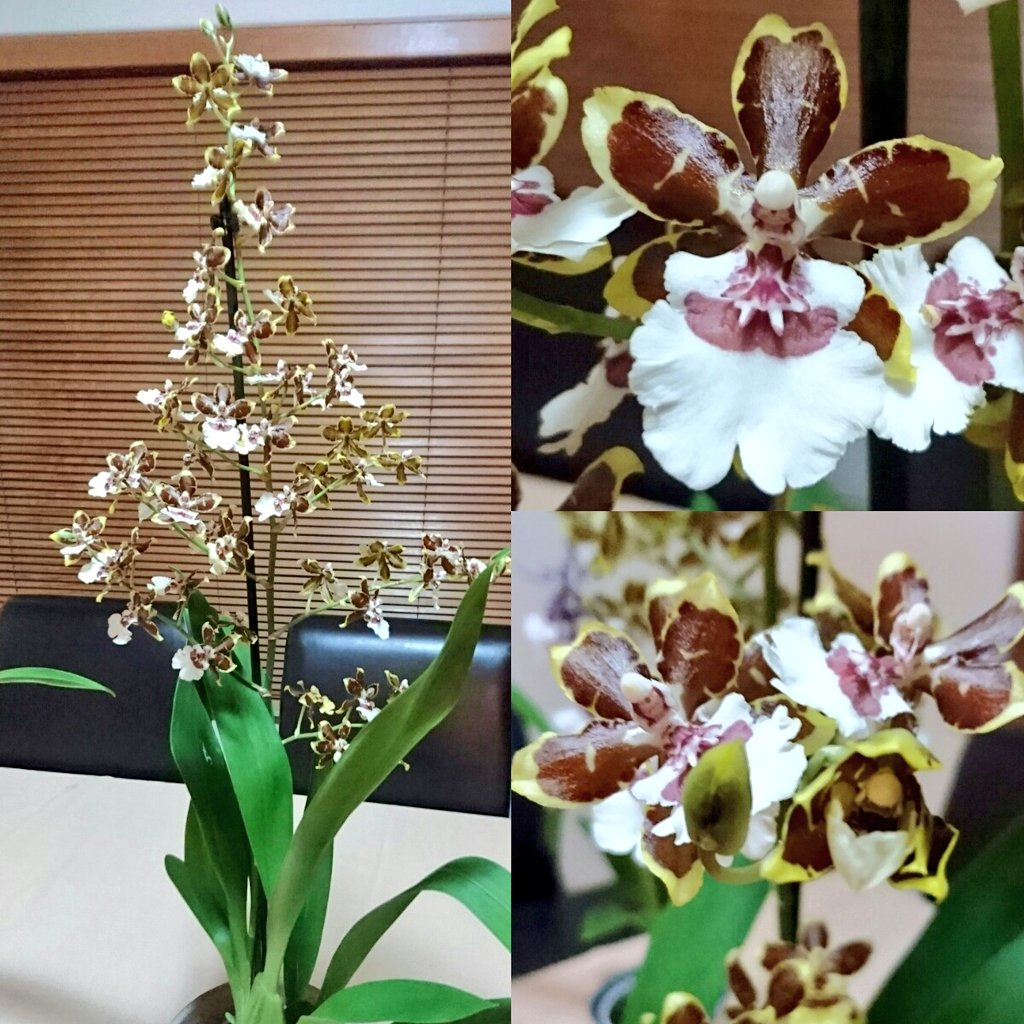
- Ons. Wildcat 'Jungle Monarch'

Scientific classification
- Kingdom: Plantae
- Clade: Tracheophytes
- Clade: Angiosperms
- Clade: Monocots
- Order: Asparagales
- Family: Orchidaceae
- Subfamily: Epidendroideae
- Subtribe: Oncidiinae
- Genus: × Oncostele; J.M.H.Shaw

= × Oncostele =

Genus of orchids

× Oncostele, abbreviated Ons., is a hybrid genus of orchids, used for greges containing at least one ancestor species from the genera Oncidium (Onc.) and Rhynchostele (Rst.). The nothogenus was defined in 2003 by J. M. H. Shaw.

== Greges ==
Over 500 greges have been registered in × Oncostele. The grex Midnight Miracles has two cultivars, 'Masai Red' and 'Masai Splash', that have gained the Royal Horticultural Society's Award of Garden Merit.

=== Primary ===
The genus × Oncostele contains the following primary hybrids:

- Ons. Black Beauty, Santa Barbara (1988) = Rst. bictoniense × Onc. leucochilum
- Ons. Elske Stolze, L.Stolze (1978) = Onc. sotoanum × Rst. bictoniensis (basionym: Odontocidium)
- Ons. Feathers, Woodland (2006) = Onc. maculatum × Rst. rossii
- Ons. Rustic Bridge, Rod McLellan Co. (1981) = Onc. fuscatum × Rst. ureskinneri

=== Non-primary ===
- Ons. Wildcat = Ons. Rustic Bridge × Onc. Crowborough, which has gained the Royal Horticultural Society's Award of Garden Merit.

=== Formerly ===
- Cus. Compadre Juan Manzur, S.Cusi (2007) = Cauc. phalaenopsis (syn. Onc. phalaenopsis) × Rst. rossii
