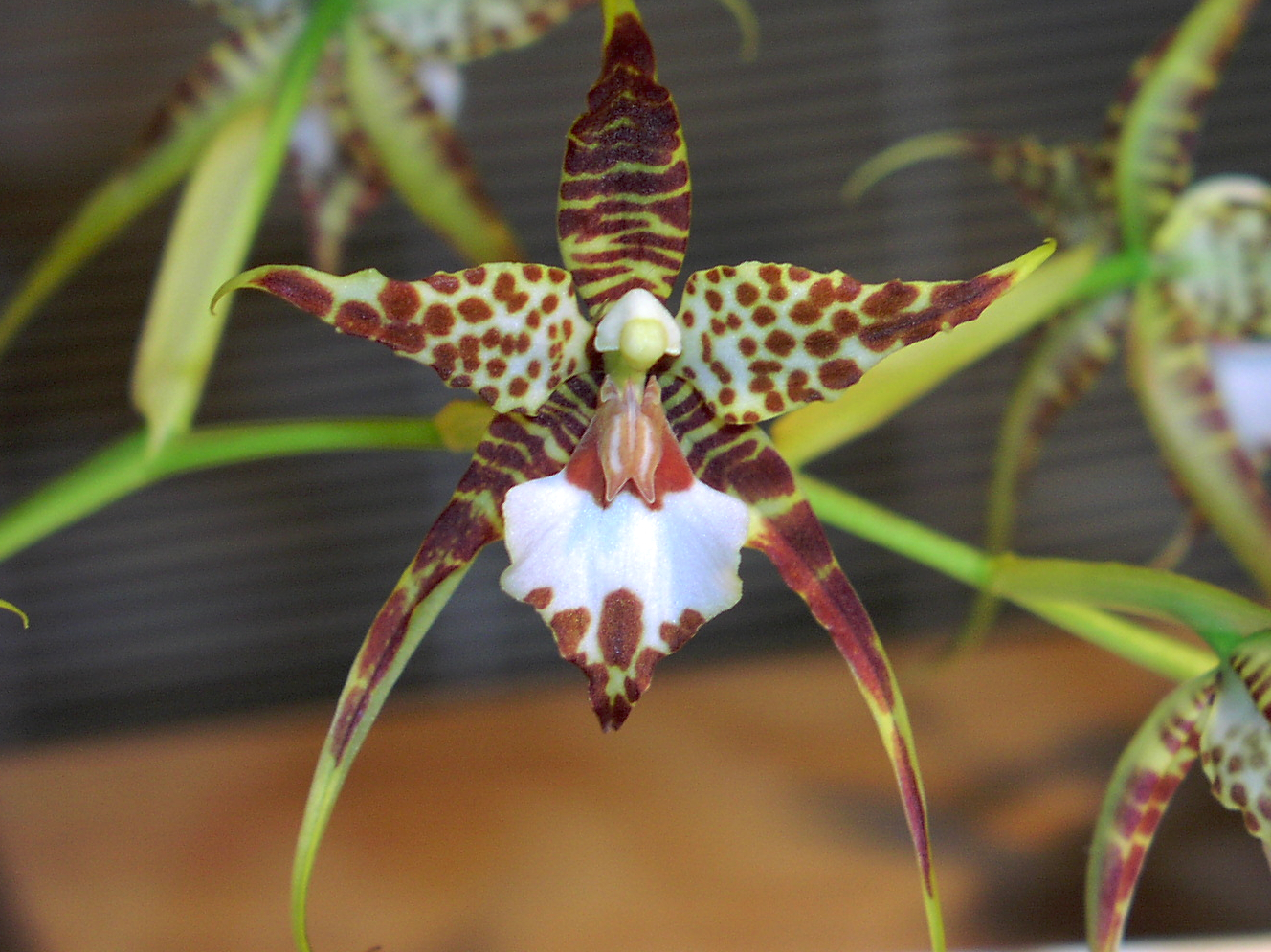
- Rhynchostele cordata

Scientific classification
- Kingdom: Plantae
- Clade: Tracheophytes
- Clade: Angiosperms
- Clade: Monocots
- Order: Asparagales
- Family: Orchidaceae
- Subfamily: Epidendroideae
- Tribe: Cymbidieae
- Subtribe: Oncidiinae
- Genus: Rhynchostele; Rchb.f.

Type species
- Rhynchostele pygmaea (Lindl.) Rchb. f.

Species
- See text

Synonyms
- Amparoa Schltr.; Cymbiglossum Halb.; Lemboglossum Halb.; Mesoglossum Halb.

= Rhynchostele =

Genus of orchids

Rhynchostele is a genus of flowering plants from the orchid family, Orchidaceae, native to Mexico, Central America and Venezuela. The genus name is abbreviated as Rst. in the horticultural trade.

== Species ==
As of December 2025, Plants of the World Online accepts the following 17 species and two hybrids:

- Rhynchostele aptera (Lex.) Soto Arenas & Salazar
- Rhynchostele bictoniensis (Bateman) Soto Arenas & Salazar
- Rhynchostele candidula (Rchb.f.) Soto Arenas & Salazar
- Rhynchostele cervantesii (Lex.) Soto Arenas & Salazar
- Rhynchostele cordata (Lindl.) Soto Arenas & Salazar
- Rhynchostele ehrenbergii (Link, Klotzsch & Otto) Soto Arenas & Salazar
- Rhynchostele galeottiana (A.Rich.) Soto Arenas & Salazar
- Rhynchostele hortensiae (R.L.Rodr.) Soto Arenas & Salazar
- Rhynchostele londesboroughiana (Rchb.f.) Soto Arenas & Salazar
- Rhynchostele maculata (Lex.) Soto Arenas & Salazar
- Rhynchostele madrensis (Rchb.f.) Soto Arenas & Salazar
- Rhynchostele majalis (Rchb.f.) Soto Arenas & Salazar
- Rhynchostele oscarii Archila
- Rhynchostele pygmaea (Lindl.) Rchb.f.
- Rhynchostele rossii (Lindl.) Soto Arenas & Salazar
- Rhynchostele stellata (Lindl.) Soto Arenas & Salazar
- Rhynchostele ureskinneri (Lindl.) Soto Arenas & Salazar

=== Hybrids ===
- Rhynchostele × humeana (Rchb.f.) Soto Arenas & Salazar
- Rhynchostele × vexativa (Rchb.f.) Soto Arenas & Salazar

== See also ==
- List of Orchidaceae genera
- × Oncostele, a hybrid genus with at least one Rhynchostele ancestor
