= Cyrtochilum falcipetalum =

Scientific classification
- Kingdom: Plantae
- Clade: Tracheophytes
- Clade: Angiosperms
- Clade: Monocots
- Order: Asparagales
- Family: Orchidaceae
- Subfamily: Epidendroideae
- Genus: Cyrtochilum
- Species: C. falcipetalum

Binomial name
- Cyrtochilum falcipetalum (Lindl.) Kraenzl.

Species of flowering plant

Cyrtochilum falcipetalum is an epiphytic orchid (family Orchidaceae) native to Colombia and Venezuela. Its most notable characteristic is its inflorescence which is a "scrambling, flexuous" panicle up to 6 m (20 ft) long and consisting of up to ten exquisitely sculpted 8 cm (3.1 in) reddish-brown and yellow flowers.
