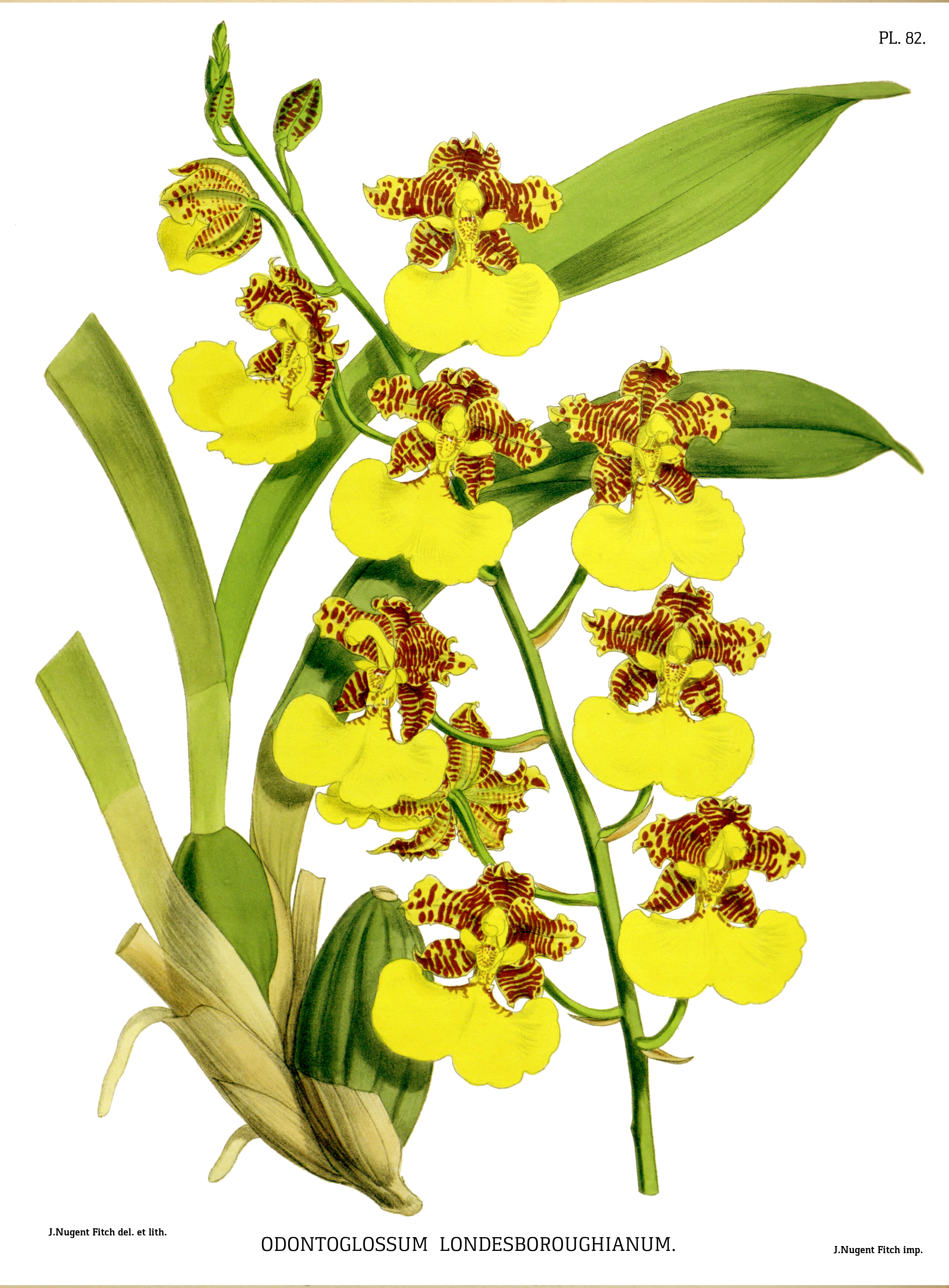

Scientific classification
- Kingdom: Plantae
- Clade: Tracheophytes
- Clade: Angiosperms
- Clade: Monocots
- Order: Asparagales
- Family: Orchidaceae
- Subfamily: Epidendroideae
- Genus: Rhynchostele
- Species: R. londesboroughiana

Binomial name
- Rhynchostele londesboroughiana (Rchb.f.) Soto Arenas & Salazar

Synonyms
- Mesoglossum londesboroughianum (Rchb.f.) Halb.; Odontoglossum londesboroughianum Rchb.f.; Amparoa londesboroughiana (Rchb.f.) Archila

= Rhynchostele londesboroughiana =

Species of orchid

Rhynchostele londesboroughiana is a species of plant in the orchid family, Orchidaceae. It is endemic to the State of Guerrero in Mexico.
