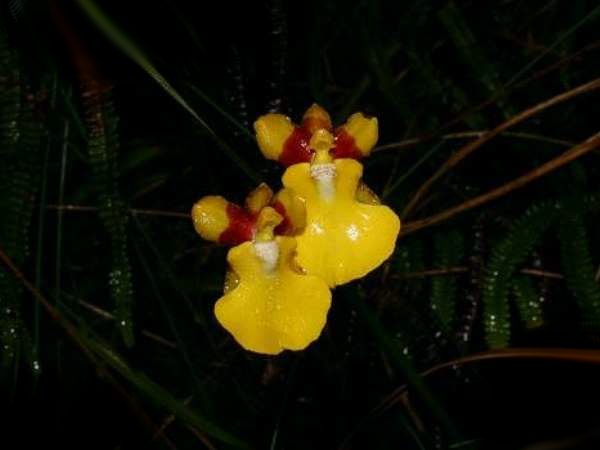
- Otoglossum harlingii

Scientific classification
- Kingdom: Plantae
- Clade: Tracheophytes
- Clade: Angiosperms
- Clade: Monocots
- Order: Asparagales
- Family: Orchidaceae
- Subfamily: Epidendroideae
- Tribe: Cymbidieae
- Subtribe: Oncidiinae
- Genus: Otoglossum (Schltr.) Garay & Dunst.

Type species
- Otoglossum hoppii

Synonyms
- Brevilongium Christenson; Ecuadorella Dodson & G.A.Romero

= Otoglossum =

Genus of orchids

Otoglossum is a genus of flowering plants from the orchid family, Orchidaceae, native to South America and Central America.

== Description ==
They are plants of ovoid pseudobulbs spaced in long, along a creeping or ascending upward rhizomes, with thick and tanned leathery leaves. The inflorescence is axillary, racemosa, erect, starting from the sheaths of the pseudobulbs, racemous, erect, with many rather large and wavy or curly, rounded flowers.

The petals and sepals have similar shapes and sizes, with very frizzy, oval, large margins, somewhat concave. The lip is inserted at the base of the column. The spine is short, sometimes with dorsal calluses. The spine is short, apodes, sometimes with dorsal calluses before the stigmatic cavity, small wings or auricles, and terminal anther somewhat inserted under the terminal margins of the spine.

== Taxonomy ==
In 2001 Mark W. Chase and Norris Williams subordinated the Oncidium section Serpentia to Otoglossum. The species in this section, Oncidium serpens, Oncidium sanctipauli, Oncidium harlingii and Oncidium globuliferum, have few and widely spaced flowers at first glance, very similar to those of Oncidium varicosum, long repeating rhizomes like those of Rodriguezia, show frequent sprouting of new plants in the nodules of ancient floral stems, and morphologically have little in common with Otoglossum other than the scandal habit.

=== Species ===
Section	Image	Name	Distribution	Elevation (m)
section Otoglossum		Otoglossum arminii (Rchb.f.) Garay & Dunst.	Colombia, Venezuela, Brazil	1,800–2,700 metres (5,900–8,900 ft)
section Otoglossum		Otoglossum axinopterum (Rchb.f.) Garay & Dunst.	Ecuador	500–2,500 metres (1,600–8,200 ft)
section Otoglossum		Otoglossum brachypterum (Rchb.f.) Garay & Dunst.	Peru	
section Otoglossum		Otoglossum candelabrum (Linden ex Pérot) Jenny & Garay	Colombia, Ecuador	1,500–1,600 metres (4,900–5,200 ft)
section Otoglossum		Otoglossum chiriquense (Rchb.f.) Garay & Dunst.	Costa Rica, Panama	800–3,000 metres (2,600–9,800 ft)
section Otoglossum		Otoglossum dayanum (Rchb.f.) Jenny & Garay	Peru	
section Otoglossum		Otoglossum hoppii (Schltr.) Garay & Dunst.	Colombia	
section Otoglossum		Otoglossum virolinense P.Ortiz & Jenny	Colombia	2,400 metres (7,900 ft)
section Otoglossum		Otoglossum weberbauerianum (Kraenzl.) Garay & Dunst.	Peru	2,000–2,300 metres (6,600–7,500 ft)
section Brevilongium		Otoglossum brevifolium (Lindl.) Garay & Dunst.	Colombia, Venezuela, Brazil, Ecuador, Peru, Bolivia	900–2,800 metres (3,000–9,200 ft)
section Brevilongium		Otoglossum harlingii (Stacy) N.H.Williams & M.W.Chase	Ecuador	1,800–3,100 metres (5,900–10,200 ft)
section Brevilongium		Otoglossum globuliferum (Kunth) N.H.Williams & M.W.Chase	Costa Rica, Panama, Colombia, Venezuela, Brazil, Ecuador, Peru	400–2,400 metres (1,300–7,900 ft)
section Brevilongium		Otoglossum palaciosii (Dodson) M.W.Chase & N.H.Williams	Ecuador	1,650 metres (5,410 ft)
section Brevilongium		Otoglossum sancti-pauli (Kraenzl.) N.H.Williams & M.W.Chase	Colombia, Venezuela	1,100–1,300 metres (3,600–4,300 ft)
section Brevilongium		Otoglossum scansor (Rchb.f.) Carnevali & I.Ramírez in J.A.Steyermark & al.	Colombia, Venezuela, Brazil	750–1,950 metres (2,460–6,400 ft)
section Brevilongium		Otoglossum serpens (Lindl.) N.H.Williams & M.W.Chase	Colombia, Ecuador, Peru	1,500–2,700 metres (4,900–8,900 ft)

== Distribution ==
Otoglossum, according to its new definition already expanded to include the aforementioned section of Oncidium, then groups about thirteen epiphytic species, occasionally terrestrial, in rule of scandal growth, that inhabit humid, fresh and cold mountainous areas from Costa Rica to Peru until the altitude of three thousand meters, over trees or rocky escarpments. Three species registered for Brazil, two belonging to the old section of Odontoglossum and one to Oncidium.

== See also ==
- List of Orchidaceae genera
