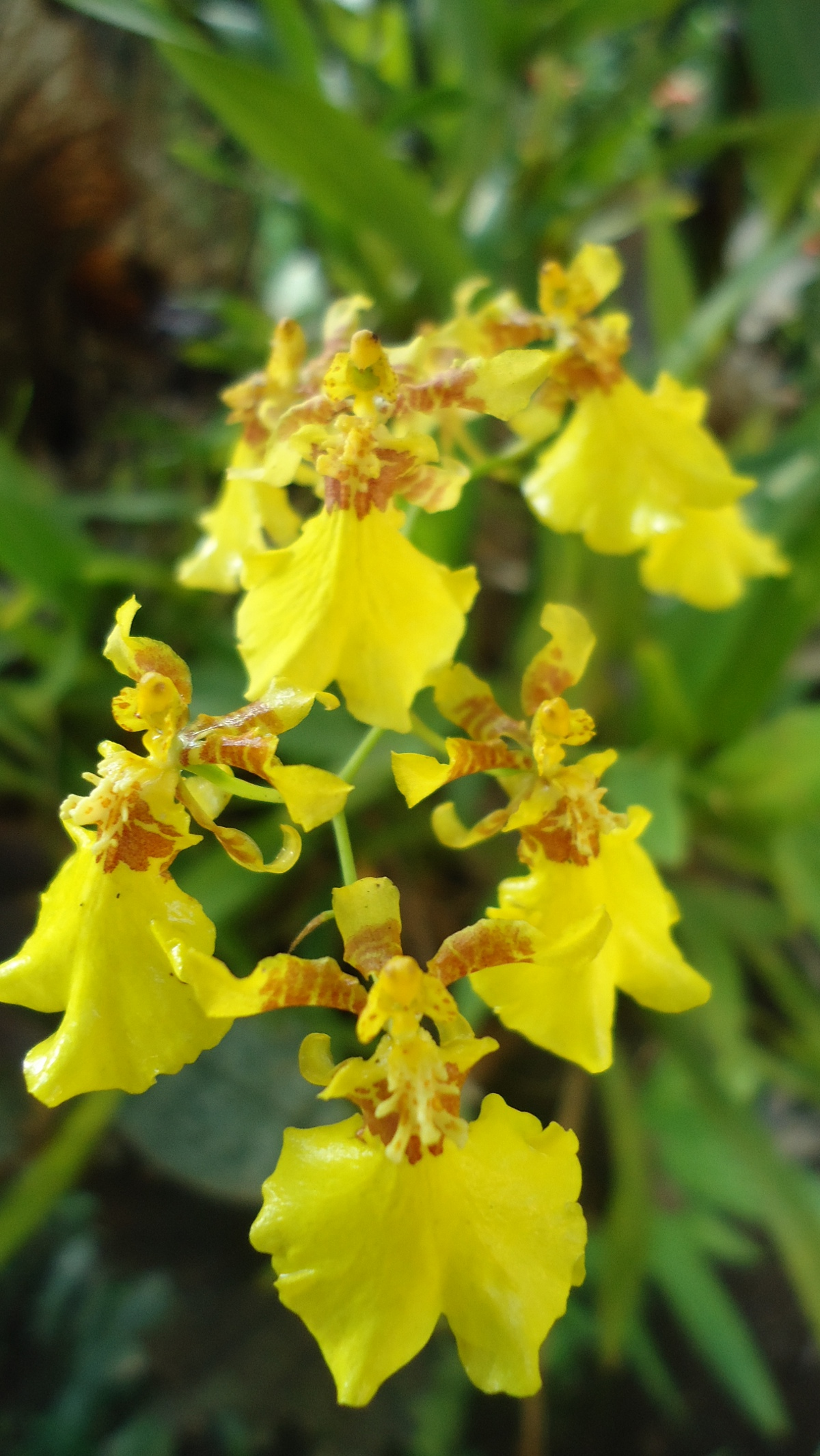

Scientific classification
- Kingdom: Plantae
- Clade: Tracheophytes
- Clade: Angiosperms
- Clade: Monocots
- Order: Asparagales
- Family: Orchidaceae
- Subfamily: Epidendroideae
- Genus: Oncidium
- Species: O. varicosum

Binomial name
- Oncidium varicosum Lindl.

Synonyms
- Oncidium rogersii Bateman; Oncidium euxanthinum Rchb.f.; Oncidium geraense Barb.Rodr.

= Oncidium varicosum =

Species of orchid

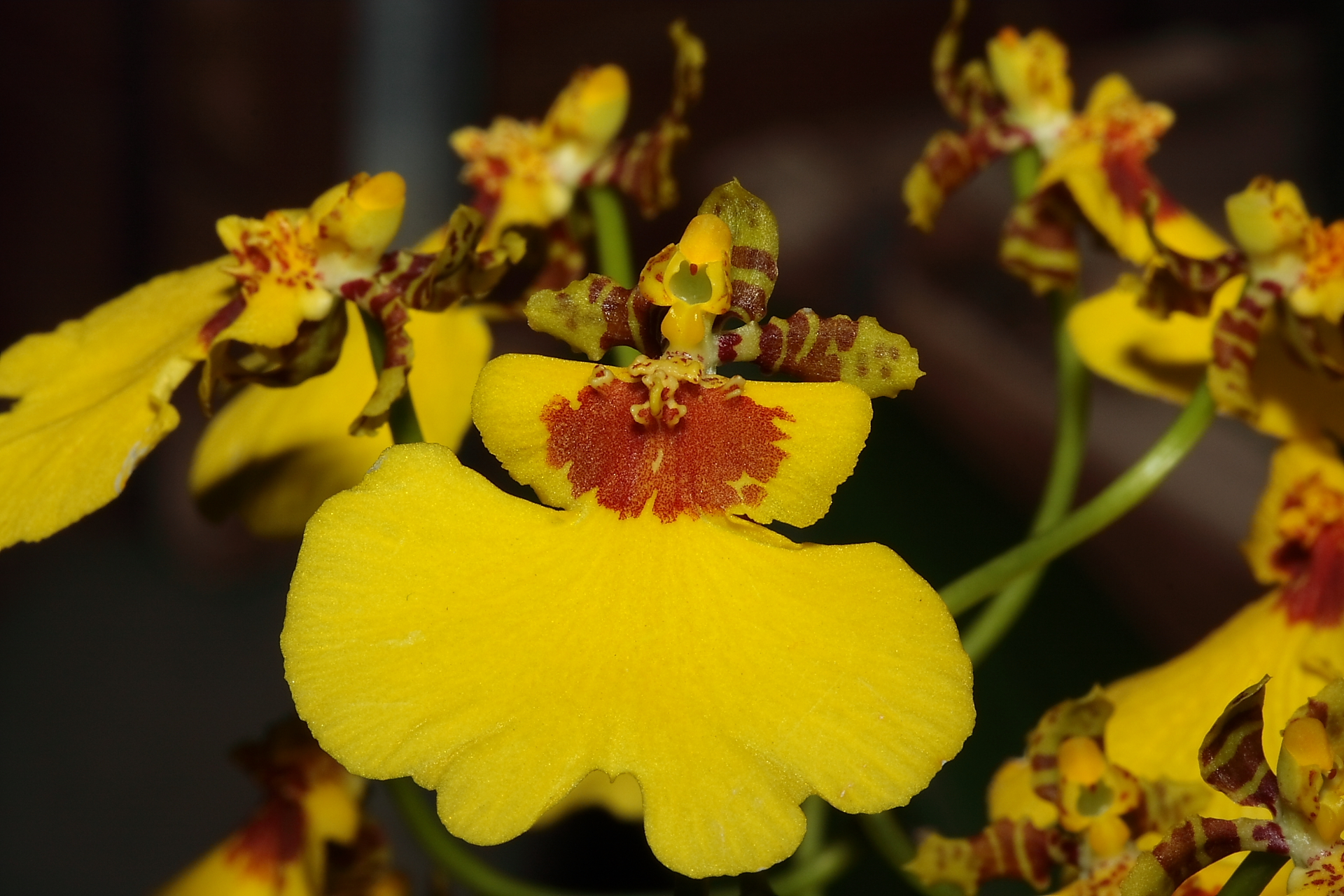
Oncidium varicosum

Oncidium varicosum is a species of orchid ranging from Brazil to northern Argentina.
