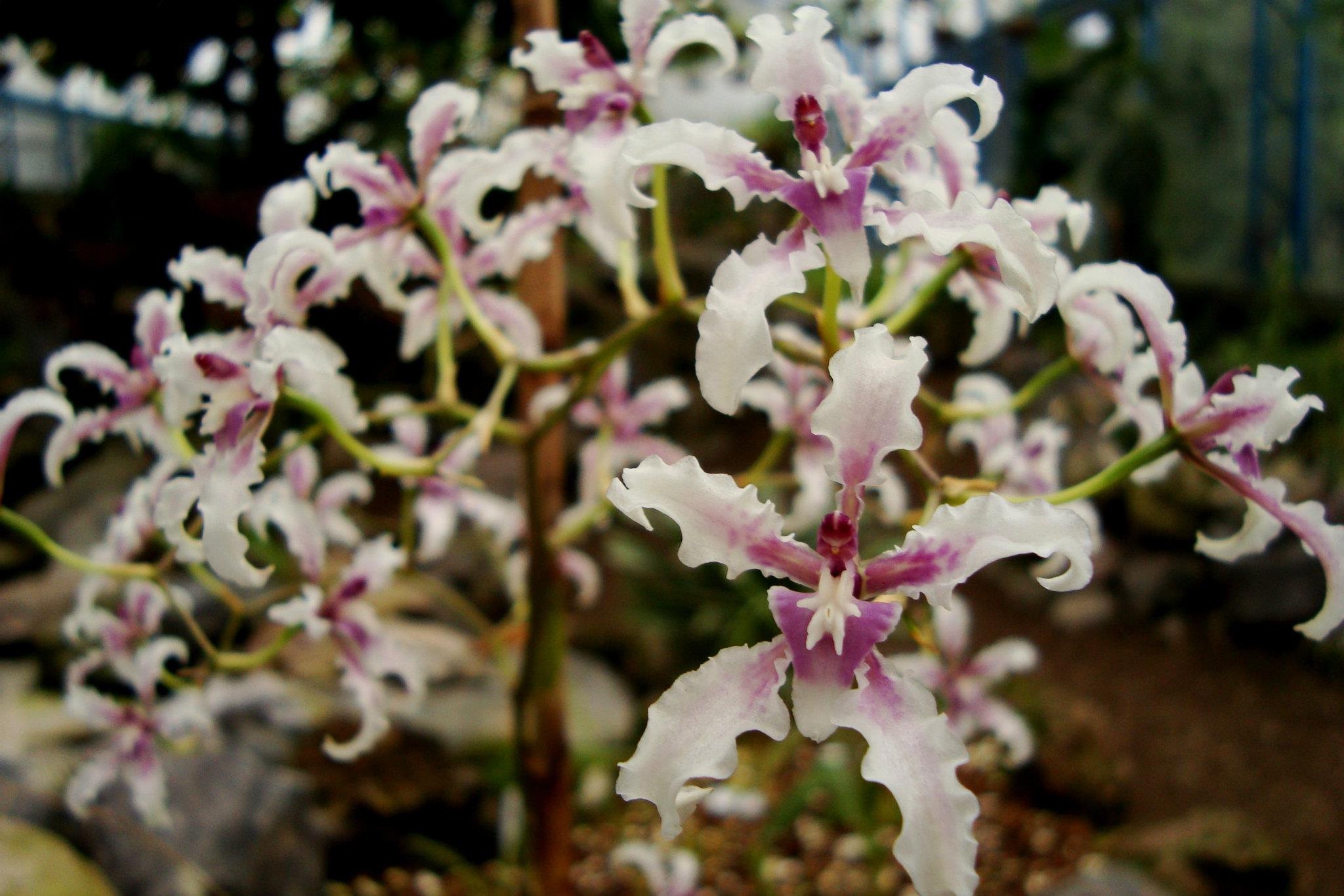
- Cyrtochilum ramosissimum

Scientific classification
- Kingdom: Plantae
- Clade: Tracheophytes
- Clade: Angiosperms
- Clade: Monocots
- Order: Asparagales
- Family: Orchidaceae
- Subfamily: Epidendroideae
- Tribe: Cymbidieae
- Subtribe: Oncidiinae
- Genus: Cyrtochilum; Kunth

Species
- See text.

Synonyms
- Buesiella C.Schweinf.; Dasyglossum Königer & Schildh.; Irenea Szlach., Mytnik, Górniak & Romowicz; Neodryas Rchb.f.; Rusbyella Rolfe; Siederella Szlach., Mytnik, Górniak & Romowicz; Trigonochilum Königer & Schildh.; Vierlingia Königer

= Cyrtochilum =

Genus of plants

Cyrtochilum is a genus of flowering plant in the family Orchidaceae, native to the Caribbean and to South America from Costa Rica to Peru. The genus was established by Carl Sigismund Kunth in 1978.

== Species ==
As of January 2023, Plants of the World Online accepted the following species:

- Cyrtochilum acuminatum (D.E.Benn. & Christenson) J.M.H.Shaw
- Cyrtochilum aemulum (Rchb.f. & Warsz.) Kraenzl.
- Cyrtochilum alboroseum (Dalström) Dalström
- Cyrtochilum albovirens N.Gut. & P.A.Harding
- Cyrtochilum album (D.E.Benn. & Christenson) J.M.H.Shaw
- Cyrtochilum alinae (Szlach.) J.M.H.Shaw
- Cyrtochilum amphiglottii (Rchb.f.) Dalström
- Cyrtochilum andreettae Königer & J.Portilla
- Cyrtochilum angustatum (Lindl.) Dalström
- Cyrtochilum annulare (Rchb.f.) Kraenzl.
- Cyrtochilum anthoxanthum (Rchb.f.) Dalström
- Cyrtochilum articulatum (Königer) Dalström
- Cyrtochilum aurantiacum (G.Gerlach & T.Franke) Dalström
- Cyrtochilum aureum (Lindl.) Senghas
- Cyrtochilum auropurpureum (Rchb.f.) Dalström
- Cyrtochilum baldeviamae (Rchb.f.) Kraenzl.
- Cyrtochilum ballii (Rolfe) Kraenzl.
- Cyrtochilum befortianum (Königer) J.M.H.Shaw
- Cyrtochilum betancurii Giraldo & Dalström
- Cyrtochilum bicolor (Ruiz & Pav.) Ormerod
- Cyrtochilum biscellum Szlach. & Kolan.
- Cyrtochilum bockemuehliae C.Castro, J.S.Moreno & Dalström
- Cyrtochilum boyacensis Szlach. & Kolan.
- Cyrtochilum brachypterum Kraenzl.
- Cyrtochilum caespitosum (Rolfe) Dalström
- Cyrtochilum caquetanum P.Ortiz, L.E.Álvarez & A.J.Carrillo
- Cyrtochilum carinatum (Königer & Deburghgr.) Dalström
- Cyrtochilum christensonianum Szlach. & Kolan.
- Cyrtochilum cimiciferum (Rchb.f.) Dalström
- Cyrtochilum cochleatum (Lindl.) Dalström
- Cyrtochilum colobium Dalström
- Cyrtochilum compactum (Rchb.f.) Dalström
- Cyrtochilum confertum (Rchb.f.) Dalström
- Cyrtochilum confusum D.E.Benn. & Christenson
- Cyrtochilum cordatum (Lindl.) Kraenzl.
- Cyrtochilum corniculatum Dalström
- Cyrtochilum cryptocopis (Rchb.f.) Kraenzl.
- Cyrtochilum cuencanum Kraenzl.
- Cyrtochilum cumandae Königer
- Cyrtochilum cupulatum (Königer) J.M.H.Shaw
- Cyrtochilum davisii (Rchb.f.) Dalström
- Cyrtochilum deburghgraeveanum Dalström & Ruíz Pérez
- Cyrtochilum decolorans Königer
- Cyrtochilum densiflorum (Lindl.) Kraenzl.
- Cyrtochilum detortum (Rchb.f.) Kraenzl.
- Cyrtochilum deuterovierlingii J.M.H.Shaw
- Cyrtochilum diceratum (Lindl.) Kraenzl.
- Cyrtochilum diodon (Rchb.f.) Kraenzl.
- Cyrtochilum dipterum (Lindl.) Kraenzl.
- Cyrtochilum distans (Rchb.f.) Kraenzl.
- Cyrtochilum divaricatum (Lindl.) Dalström
- Cyrtochilum dunstervilleorum Morillo & Dalström
- Cyrtochilum edwardii (Rchb.f.) Kraenzl.
- Cyrtochilum englerianum (Kraenzl.) Kraenzl.
- Cyrtochilum examinans (Lindl.) Kraenzl.
- Cyrtochilum exasperatum (Linden & Rchb.f.) Kraenzl.
- Cyrtochilum falcipetalum (Lindl.) Kraenzl.
- Cyrtochilum fernandezii Morillo & Dalström
- Cyrtochilum ferrugineum Dalström & D.Trujillo
- Cyrtochilum fidicularium (Dalström) Dalström
- Cyrtochilum flavostellulare Dalström
- Cyrtochilum flexuosum Kunth
- Cyrtochilum fractiflexum (F.Lehm. & Kraenzl.) Kraenzl.
- Cyrtochilum fredericae Dalström
- Cyrtochilum funis (F.Lehm. & Kraenzl.) Kraenzl.
- Cyrtochilum garayi Szlach. & Kolan.
- Cyrtochilum gargantua (Rchb.f.) Kraenzl.
- Cyrtochilum geniculatum Königer
- Cyrtochilum gentryi Dalström & W.E.Higgins
- Cyrtochilum gerdvierlingii Lückel
- Cyrtochilum gracielae Dalström
- Cyrtochilum gracile (Lindl.) Kraenzl.
- Cyrtochilum graminoides Dalström
- Cyrtochilum grandiflorum (Rchb.f.) Kraenzl.
- Cyrtochilum guariniae Szlach. & Kolan.
- Cyrtochilum guavianum Ordóñez-Blanco & E.Parra
- Cyrtochilum gyriferum Kraenzl.
- Cyrtochilum halteratum (Lindl.) Kraenzl.
- Cyrtochilum hastatum (Ruiz & Pav.) Dalström
- Cyrtochilum hirtzii Dalström
- Cyrtochilum hoeijeri (Dalström) Dalström
- Cyrtochilum huertasii Szlach. & Kolan.
- Cyrtochilum incarum Kraenzl.
- Cyrtochilum insculptum (Rchb.f.) Kraenzl.
- Cyrtochilum ionodon (Rchb.f.) Dalström
- Cyrtochilum ioplocon (Rchb.f.) Dalström
- Cyrtochilum ixioides Lindl.
- Cyrtochilum klabochii Szlach. & Kolan.
- Cyrtochilum koenigeri Szlach. & Kolan.
- Cyrtochilum kraenzlinianum Szlach. & Kolan.
- Cyrtochilum lamelligerum (Rchb.f.) Kraenzl.
- Cyrtochilum lapacense (R.Vásquez & Dalström) Dalström
- Cyrtochilum lehmannii Szlach. & Kolan.
- Cyrtochilum leopoldianum (Rolfe) Kraenzl.
- Cyrtochilum leucopterum (Rchb.f.) Dalström
- Cyrtochilum ligulatum (Ruiz & Pav.) Mansf. ex Dalström
- Cyrtochilum linguiforme (Lindl.) Kraenzl.
- Cyrtochilum llanachagaense (D.E.Benn. & Christenson) J.M.H.Shaw
- Cyrtochilum loesenerianum (Schltr.) Dalström
- Cyrtochilum longifolium (Lindl.) Kraenzl.
- Cyrtochilum longipes (Rchb.f. & Warsz.) Kraenzl.
- Cyrtochilum loxense (Lindl.) Kraenzl.
- Cyrtochilum luerorum Dalström
- Cyrtochilum maasii Szlach. & Kolan.
- Cyrtochilum macasense (Dodson) Dalström
- Cyrtochilum macranthum (Lindl.) Kraenzl.
- Cyrtochilum matangense (Bockemühl) Dalström
- Cyrtochilum megalophium (Lindl.) Kraenzl.
- Cyrtochilum meirax (Rchb.f.) Dalström
- Cyrtochilum melanthes (Rchb.f. & Warsz.) Kraenzl.
- Cyrtochilum mendax (Rchb.f.) Kraenzl.
- Cyrtochilum metallicum (Rchb.f.) Kraenzl.
- Cyrtochilum methonica (Rchb.f.) Kraenzl.
- Cyrtochilum mezae D.E.Benn. & Christenson
- Cyrtochilum microxiphium (Rchb.f.) Kraenzl.
- Cyrtochilum midas Dalström
- Cyrtochilum minax (Rchb.f.) Kraenzl.
- Cyrtochilum misasianum P.Ortiz
- Cyrtochilum miserrimum (Rchb.f.) Kraenzl.
- Cyrtochilum × monacranthum (Andreetta ex Dodson) J.M.H.Shaw
- Cyrtochilum murinum (Rchb.f.) Kraenzl.
- Cyrtochilum myanthum (Lindl.) Kraenzl.
- Cyrtochilum mystacinum Lindl.
- Cyrtochilum orgyale (Rchb.f. & Warsz.) Kraenzl.
- Cyrtochilum orientale (Rchb.f.) Dalström
- Cyrtochilum ornatum (Königer) Dalström
- Cyrtochilum orozcoi Szlach. & Kolan.
- Cyrtochilum ortizianum Szlach. & Kolan.
- Cyrtochilum ospinae Szlach. & Kolan.
- Cyrtochilum palmatum Szlach. & Kolan.
- Cyrtochilum panduratum Dalström & D.Trujillo
- Cyrtochilum pardinum Lindl.
- Cyrtochilum parvibrachium Dalström
- Cyrtochilum parviflorum (Ruiz & Pav.) Pupulin
- Cyrtochilum pastasae (Rchb.f.) Kraenzl.
- Cyrtochilum patens (Senghas & Thiv) Dalström
- Cyrtochilum plicigerum (Rchb.f.) Kraenzl.
- Cyrtochilum pollex Dalström & D.Trujillo
- Cyrtochilum porrigens (Rchb.f.) Kraenzl.
- Cyrtochilum portillae Königer
- Cyrtochilum pozoi Königer
- Cyrtochilum pusillum (C.Schweinf.) Dalström
- Cyrtochilum quinqueseriale (Königer) J.M.H.Shaw
- Cyrtochilum ramiro-medinae P.Ortiz
- Cyrtochilum ramosissimum (Lindl.) Dalström
- Cyrtochilum rangelii Szlach. & Kolan.
- Cyrtochilum renisepalum Szlach. & Kolan.
- Cyrtochilum retusum (Lindl.) Kraenzl.
- Cyrtochilum revolutum (Lindl.) Dalström
- Cyrtochilum rhodoneurum (Rchb.f.) Dalström
- Cyrtochilum rigidum (Lindl.) Dalström
- Cyrtochilum ringens (Rchb.f.) Dalström
- Cyrtochilum rostratum Schltr.
- Cyrtochilum rubrocallosum (D.E.Benn. & Christenson) Pfahl
- Cyrtochilum ruizii Dalström & Deburghgr.
- Cyrtochilum russellianum Dalström & Ruíz Pérez
- Cyrtochilum rusticum (Linden & Rchb.f.) Kraenzl.
- Cyrtochilum sanderianum (Rolfe) Königer
- Cyrtochilum santanderensis Szlach. & Kolan.
- Cyrtochilum scabiosum Rchb.f. ex Kraenzl.
- Cyrtochilum schildhaueri (Königer) Dalström
- Cyrtochilum schmidt-mummii Dalström & C.Castro
- Cyrtochilum schulzei (Schltr.) Dalström
- Cyrtochilum serratum (Lindl.) Kraenzl.
- Cyrtochilum sharoniae Dalström
- Cyrtochilum sibundoyense Szlach. & Kolan.
- Cyrtochilum sigchae (Königer) J.M.H.Shaw
- Cyrtochilum simulans Schltr.
- Cyrtochilum sodiroi (Schltr.) Dalström
- Cyrtochilum soennemarkii Dalström
- Cyrtochilum sphinx Dalström & G.Calat.
- Cyrtochilum stenochilum (Linden & Rchb.f.) Dalström
- Cyrtochilum steyermarkii (Foldats) Kolan. & Szlach.
- Cyrtochilum suarezianum J.M.H.Shaw
- Cyrtochilum suarezii (D.E.Benn. & Christenson) J.M.H.Shaw
- Cyrtochilum tanii Dalström
- Cyrtochilum tenense (Rchb.f. & Warsz.) Kraenzl.
- Cyrtochilum tetracopis (Rchb.f.) Kraenzl.
- Cyrtochilum tetraplasium (Rchb.f.) Dalström
- Cyrtochilum tricorne Dalström & Ruíz Pérez
- Cyrtochilum tricostatum Kraenzl.
- Cyrtochilum trifurcatum (Lindl.) Kraenzl.
- Cyrtochilum trigibbum (Königer) J.M.H.Shaw
- Cyrtochilum trilingue (Lindl.) Kraenzl.
- Cyrtochilum triphyllum (Ruiz & Pav.) Pupulin
- Cyrtochilum tucumanense (Rchb.f.) Kraenzl.
- Cyrtochilum tumiferum Königer
- Cyrtochilum umbonatum (Rchb.f.) Kraenzl.
- Cyrtochilum umbrosum (Rchb.f.) Dalström
- Cyrtochilum undulatum Kunth
- Cyrtochilum ustulatum (Rchb.f.) Kraenzl.
- Cyrtochilum vasquezii (Christenson) J.M.H.Shaw
- Cyrtochilum ventilabrum (Rchb.f. & Warsz.) Kraenzl.
- Cyrtochilum verrucosum Dalström
- Cyrtochilum verstraeteanum Dalström & Deburghgr.
- Cyrtochilum vierlingii Königer
- Cyrtochilum viminale (Rchb.f.) Dalström
- Cyrtochilum violaceum Dalström
- Cyrtochilum volubile Poepp. & Endl.
- Cyrtochilum weirii (Rchb.f.) Dalström
- Cyrtochilum werneri (Schltr.) Dalström
- Cyrtochilum wetzelii (Königer) J.M.H.Shaw
- Cyrtochilum williamsianum (Dodson) Dalström
- Cyrtochilum xanthocinctum Dalström & Ruíz Pérez
- Cyrtochilum xanthodon (Rchb.f.) Kraenzl.
- Cyrtochilum zebrinum (Rchb.f.) Kraenzl.
