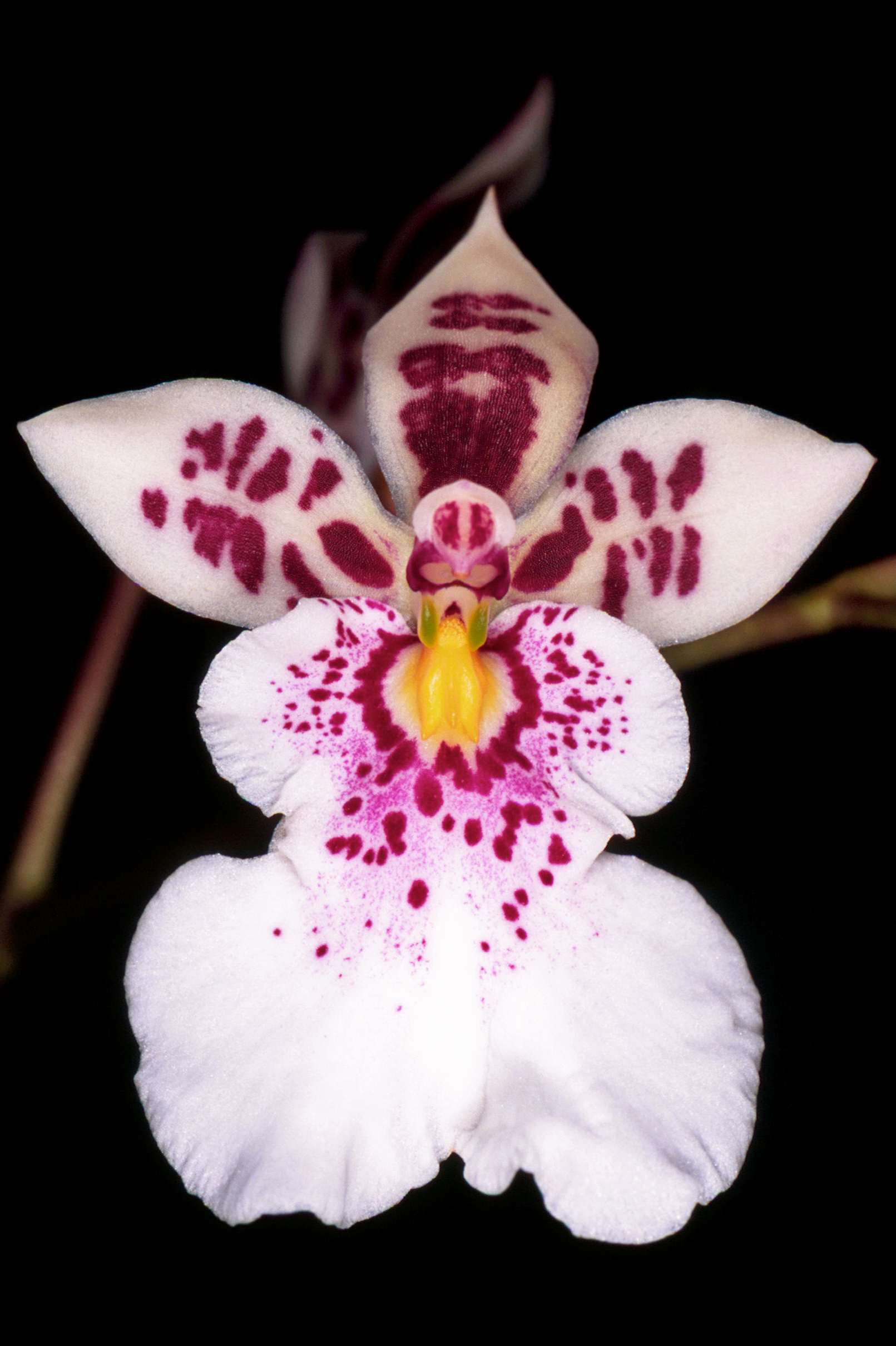
- Caucaea phalaenopsis

Scientific classification
- Kingdom: Plantae
- Clade: Tracheophytes
- Clade: Angiosperms
- Clade: Monocots
- Order: Asparagales
- Family: Orchidaceae
- Subfamily: Epidendroideae
- Tribe: Cymbidieae
- Subtribe: Oncidiinae
- Genus: Caucaea; Schltr.

Type species
- Caucaea obscura (syn of C. radiata) (F. Lehm. & Kraenzl.)Schltr.

= Caucaea =

Genus of orchids

Caucaea is a genus of flowering plants from the orchid family, Orchidaceae. It contains 9 currently recognized species, all native to northwestern South America.

== List of species ==
As of November 2024, Plants of the World Online accepted the following species:

Image	Scientific name	Distribution	Elevation (m)
	Caucaea alticola (Stacy) N.H.Williams & M.W.Chase	Ecuador	2,700–3,000 metres (8,900–9,800 ft)
	Caucaea andigena (Linden & Rchb.f.) N.H.Williams & M.W.Chase	Ecuador	2,200–2,600 metres (7,200–8,500 ft)
	Caucaea caucana Szlach. & Kolan.	Colombia	2,500–4,000 metres (8,200–13,100 ft)
	Caucaea colombiana Uribe Vélez, Sauleda & Szlach.	Colombia	
	Caucaea dodsoniana Szlach. & Kolan.	Ecuador	
	Caucaea duquei Szlach. & Kolan.	Colombia	
	Caucaea hernandezii (Königer) Kolan., Hirtz & Tobar	Ecuador	3,000 metres (9,800 ft)
	Caucaea kunthiana H.Medina, J.Portilla & Hirtz	Ecuador	3,000–3,500 metres (9,800–11,500 ft)
	Caucaea macrotyle (Königer & J.Portilla) Königer	Ecuador	
	Caucaea nubigena (Lindl.) N.H.Williams & M.W.Chase	Ecuador, Colombia, Venezuela, Peru	2,500–3,500 metres (8,200–11,500 ft)
	Caucaea olivacea (Kunth) N.H.Williams & M.W.Chase	Ecuador, Colombia	2,300–3,960 metres (7,550–12,990 ft)
	Caucaea phalaenopsis (Linden & Rchb.f.) N.H.Williams & M.W.Chase	Ecuador, Colombia	2,700–2,800 metres (8,900–9,200 ft)
	Caucaea pichinchae Szlach. & Kolan.	Ecuador	
	Caucaea pseudoandigena Szlach. & Kolan.	Ecuador	
	Caucaea radiata (Lindl.) Mansf.	Ecuador, Colombia, Venezuela	2,400–2,850 metres (7,870–9,350 ft)
	Caucaea sanguinolenta (Lindl.) N.H.Williams & M.W.Chase	Ecuador, Colombia, Venezuela	3,000 metres (9,800 ft)
	Caucaea tripterygia (Rchb.f.) N.H.Williams & M.W.Chase	Ecuador, Peru	3,000 metres (9,800 ft)

== See also ==
- List of Orchidaceae genera
