= List of plant genera named after people (Q–Z) =

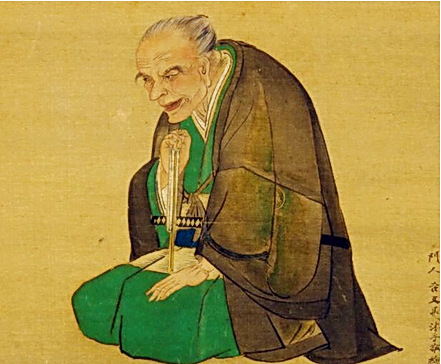
Portrait of Ono Ranzan

Since the first printing of Carl Linnaeus's Species Plantarum in 1753, plants have been assigned one epithet or name for their species and one name for their genus, a grouping of related species. Thousands of plants have been named after people, including botanists and their colleagues, plant collectors, horticulturists, explorers, rulers, politicians, clerics, doctors, philosophers and scientists. (Note: Other naturalists have also been honored, including agronomists, apothecaries, geographers, geologists, meteorologists, mycologists, pharmacologists and zoologists.) Even before Linnaeus, botanists such as Joseph Pitton de Tournefort, Charles Plumier and Pier Antonio Micheli were naming plants after people, sometimes in gratitude for the financial support of their patrons.

Early works researching the naming of plant genera include an 1810 glossary by Alexandre de Théis and an etymological dictionary in two editions (1853 and 1856) by Georg Christian Wittstein. Modern works include The Gardener's Botanical by Ross Bayton, Index of Eponymic Plant Names and Encyclopedia of Eponymic Plant Names by Lotte Burkhardt, Plants of the World by Maarten J. M. Christenhusz (lead author), Michael F. Fay and Mark W. Chase, The A to Z of Plant Names by Allan J. Coombes, the four-volume CRC World Dictionary of Plant Names by Umberto Quattrocchi, and Stearn's Dictionary of Plant Names for Gardeners by William T. Stearn; these supply the seed-bearing genera listed in the first column below. Excluded from this list are genus names not accepted (as of January 2021) at Plants of the World Online, which includes updates to Plants of the World (2017).

== Key ==
Ba = listed in Bayton's The Gardener's Botanical
Bt = listed in Burkhardt's Encyclopedia of Eponymic Plant Names
Bu = listed in Burkhardt's Index of Eponymic Plant Names
Ch = listed in Christenhusz's Plants of the World
Co = listed in Coombes's The A to Z of Plant Names
Qu = listed in Quattrocchi's CRC World Dictionary of Plant Names
St = listed in Stearn's Dictionary of Plant Names for Gardeners

In addition, Burkhardt's Index is used as a reference for every row in the table.

== Genera ==
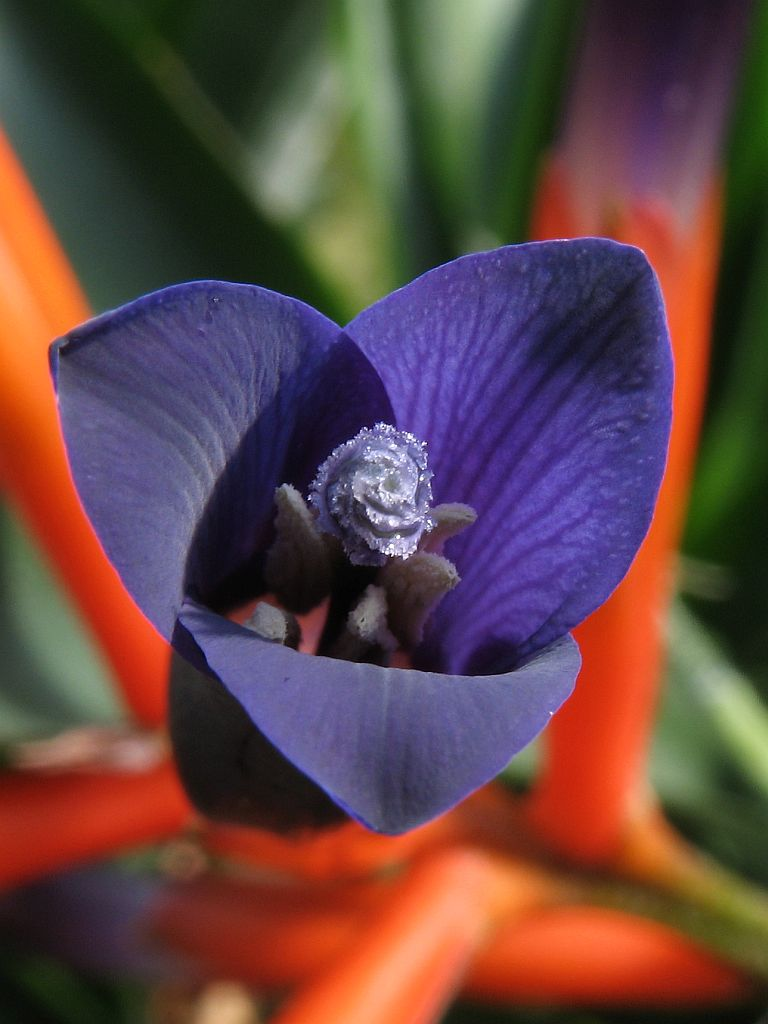
Quesnelia

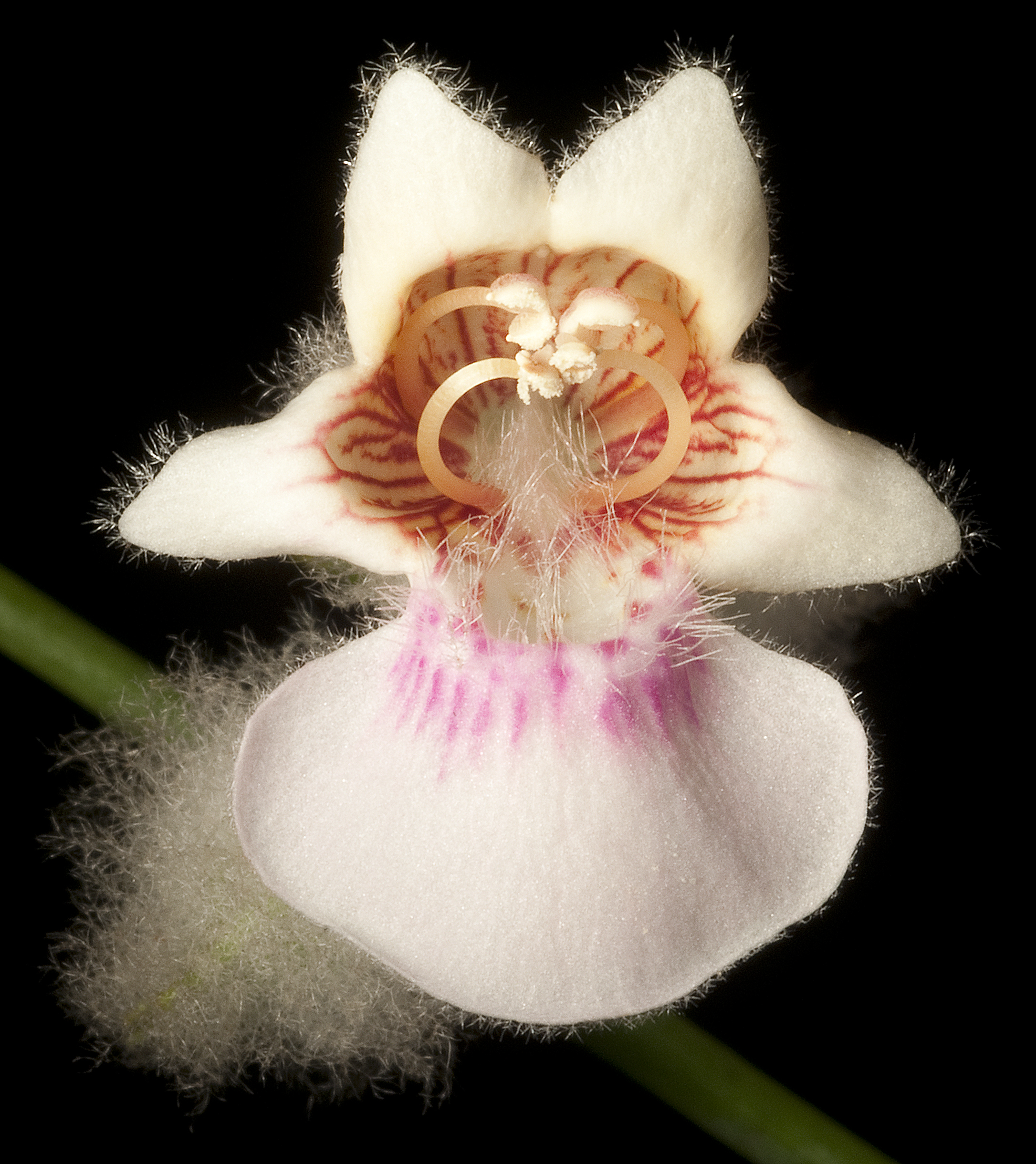
Quoya

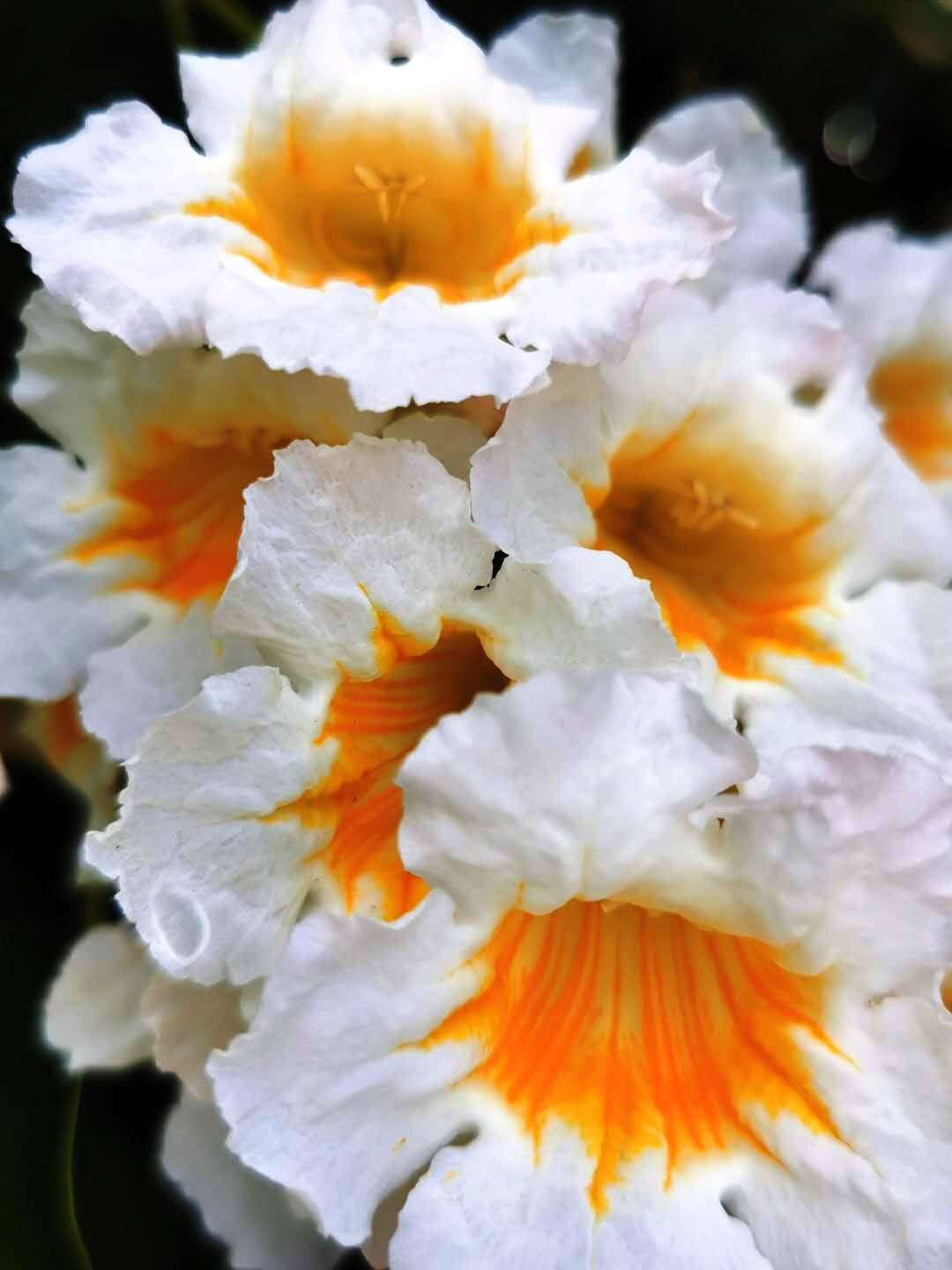
Radermachera

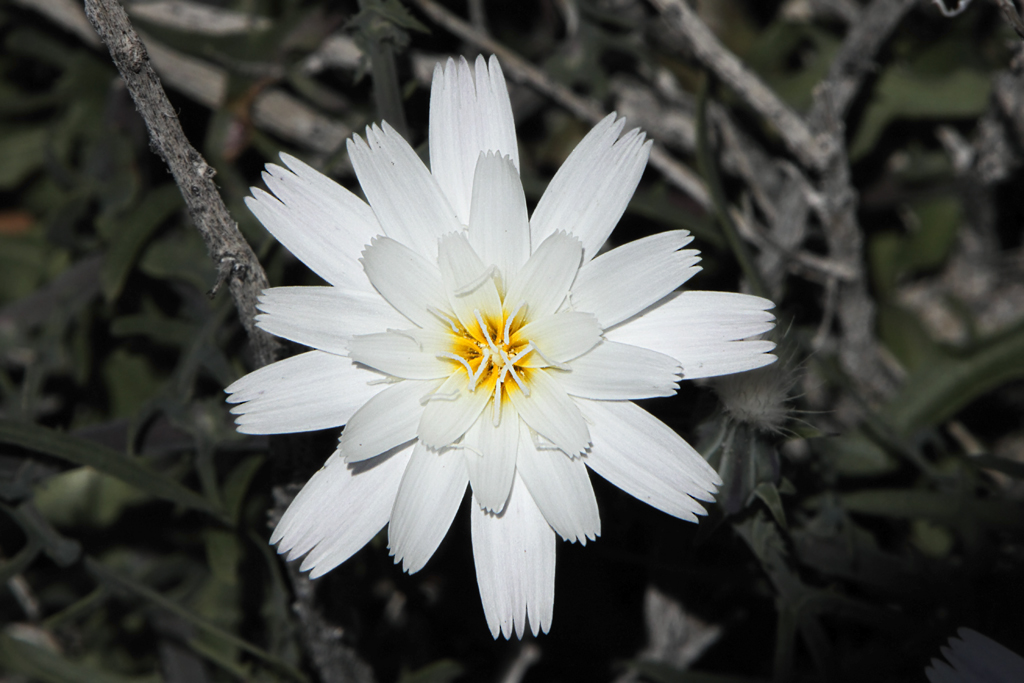
Rafinesquia

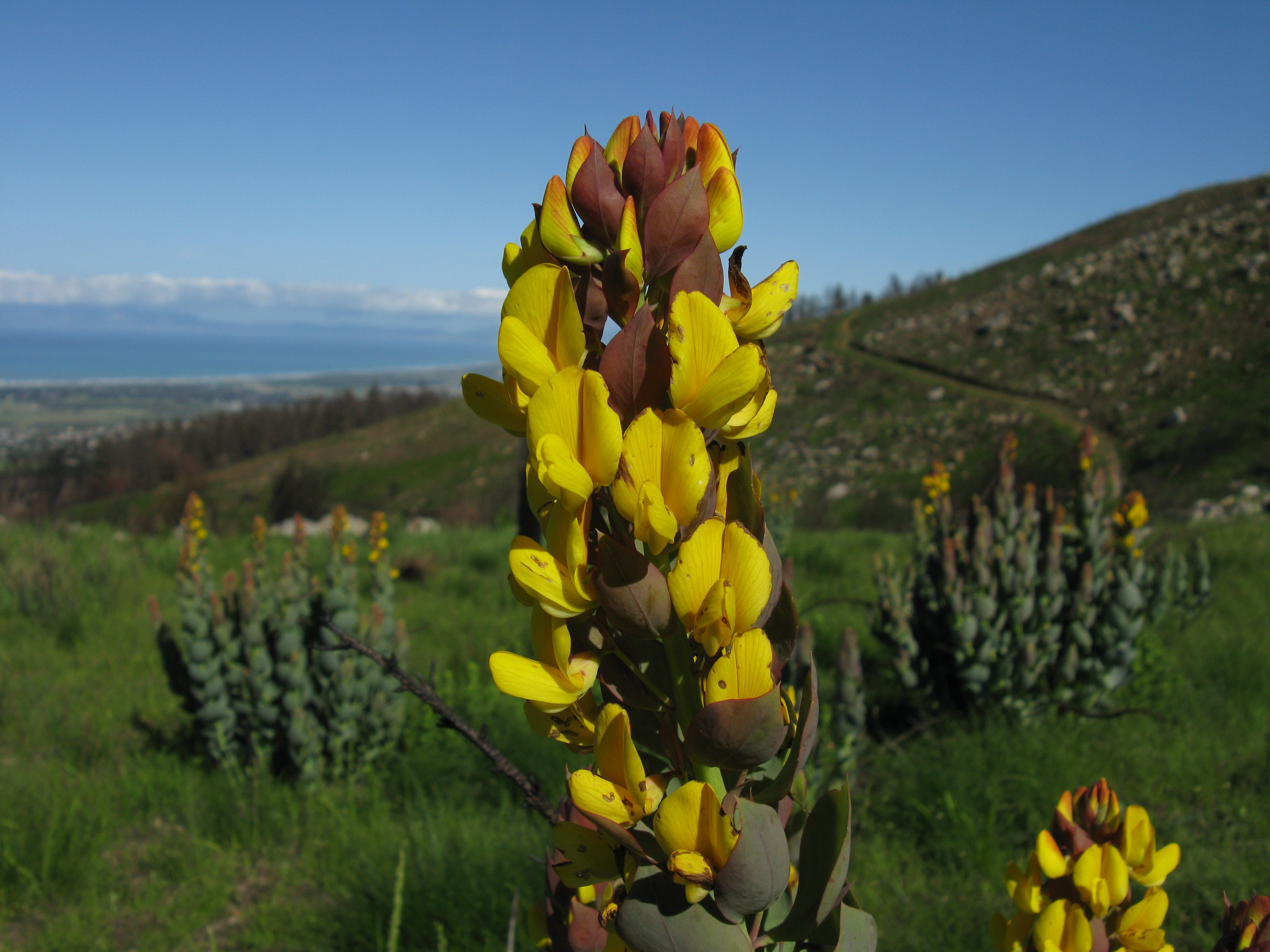
Rafnia

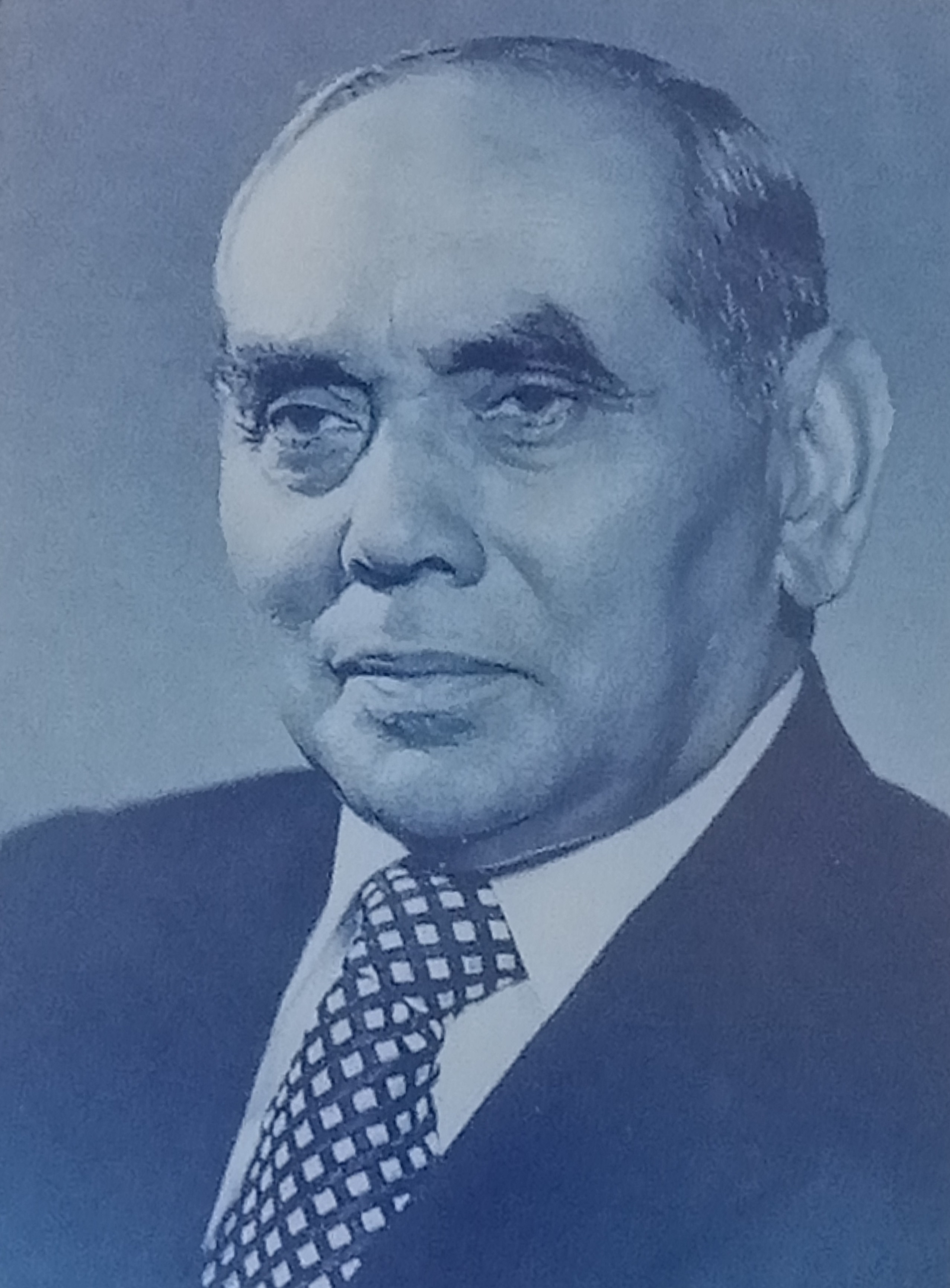
Raman Osman

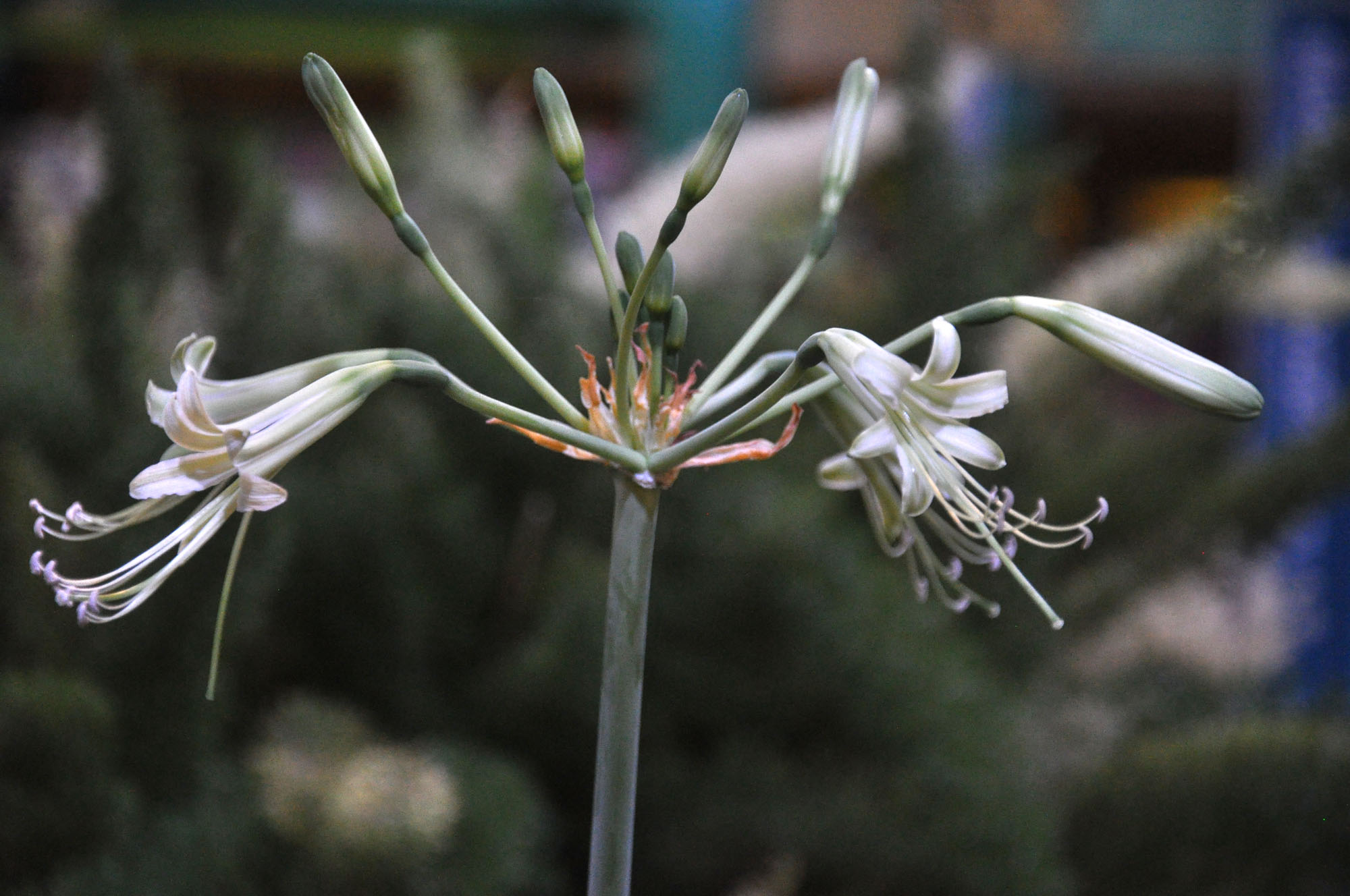
Rauhia

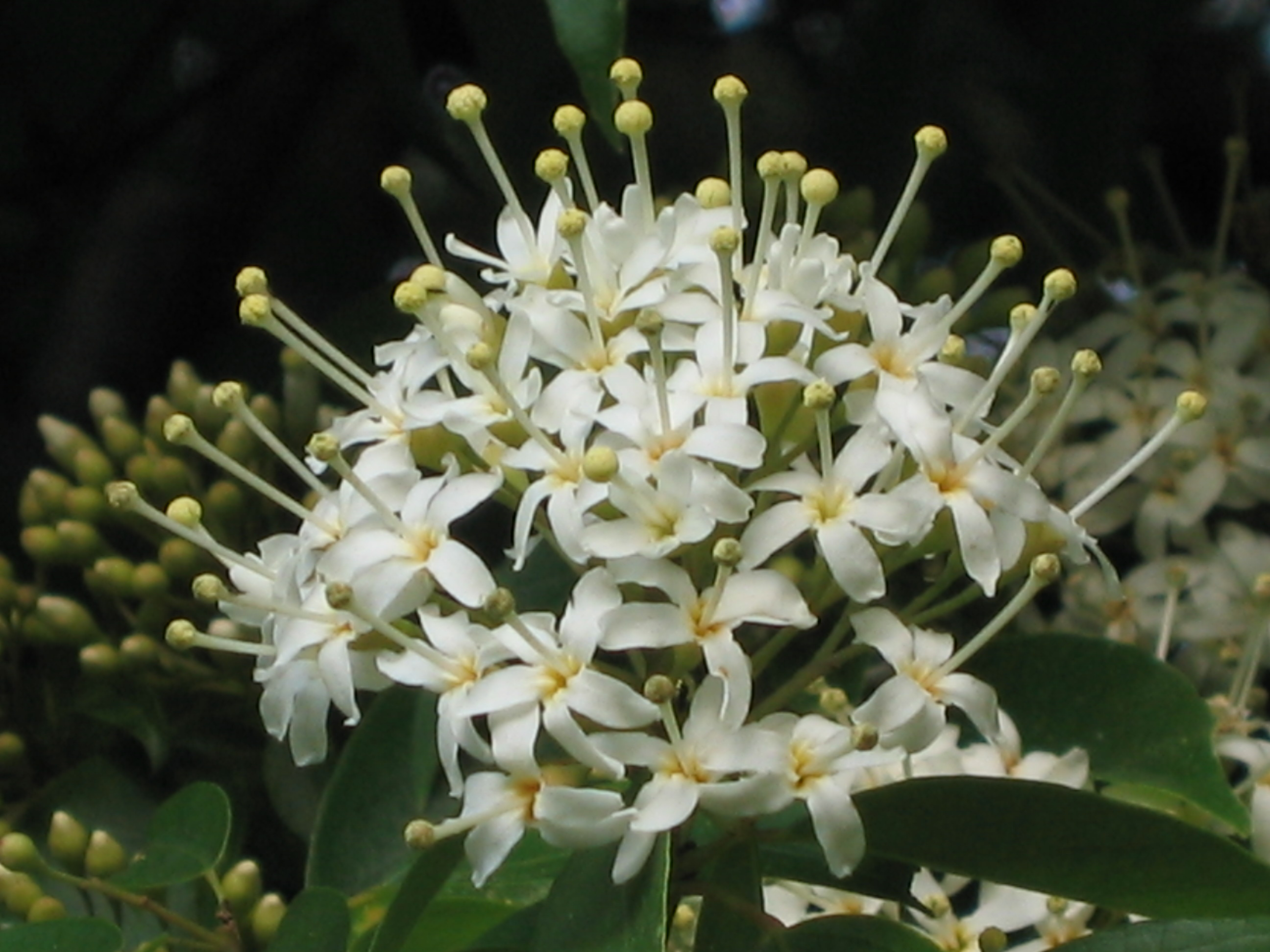
Reevesia

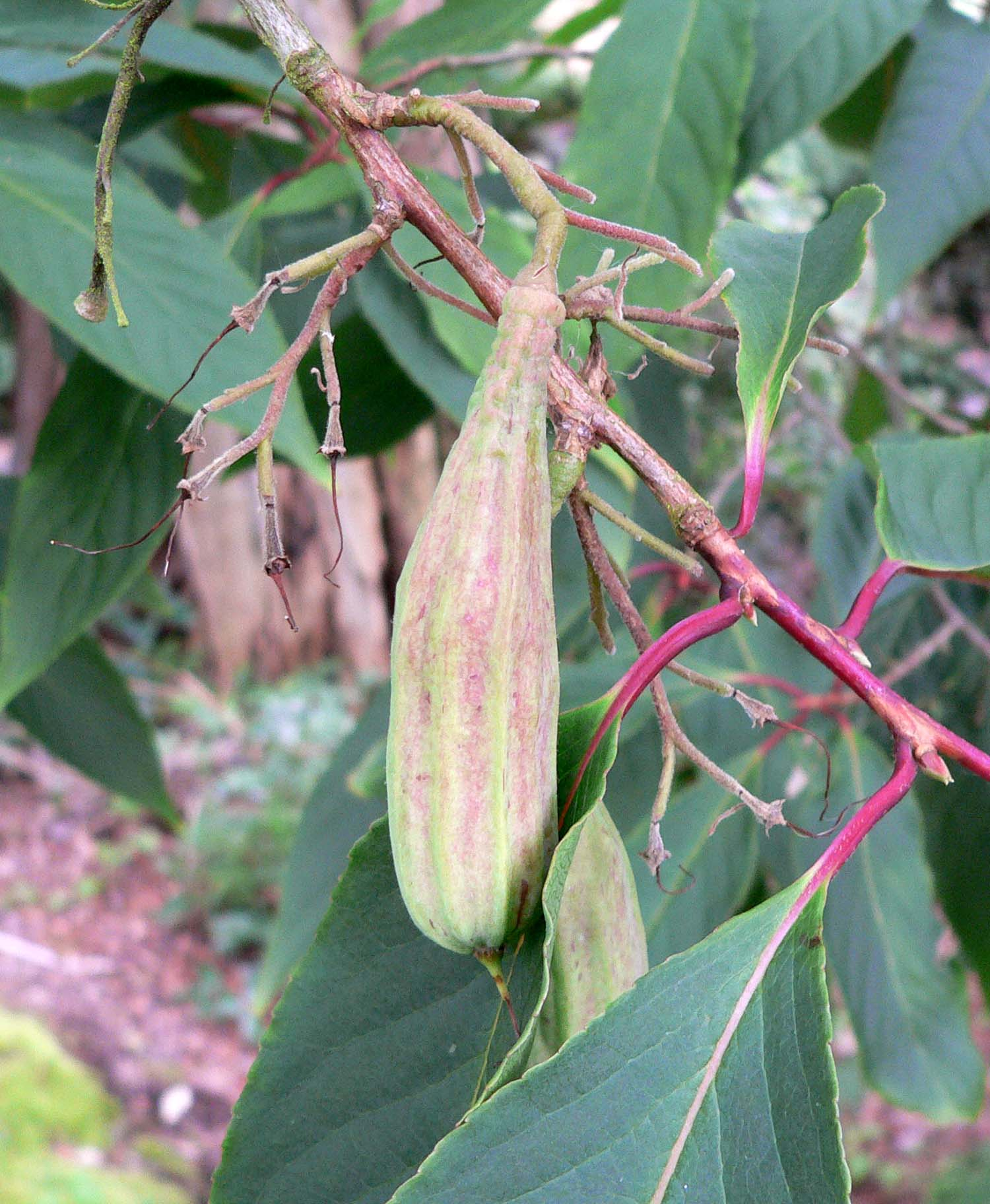
Rehderodendron

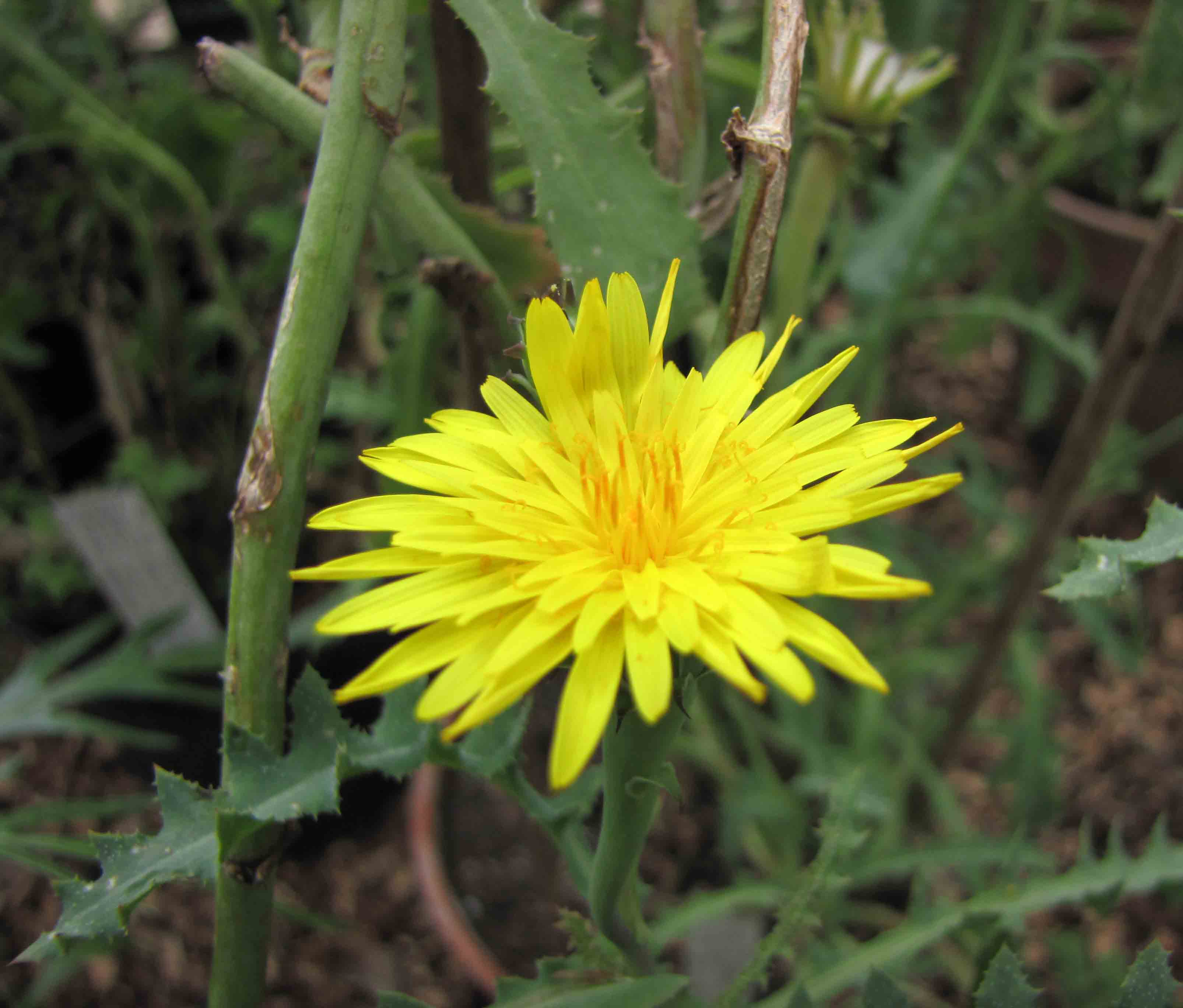
Reichardia

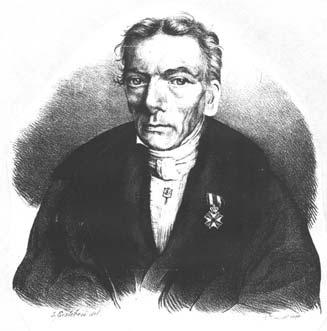
Portrait of Caspar Georg Carl Reinwardt

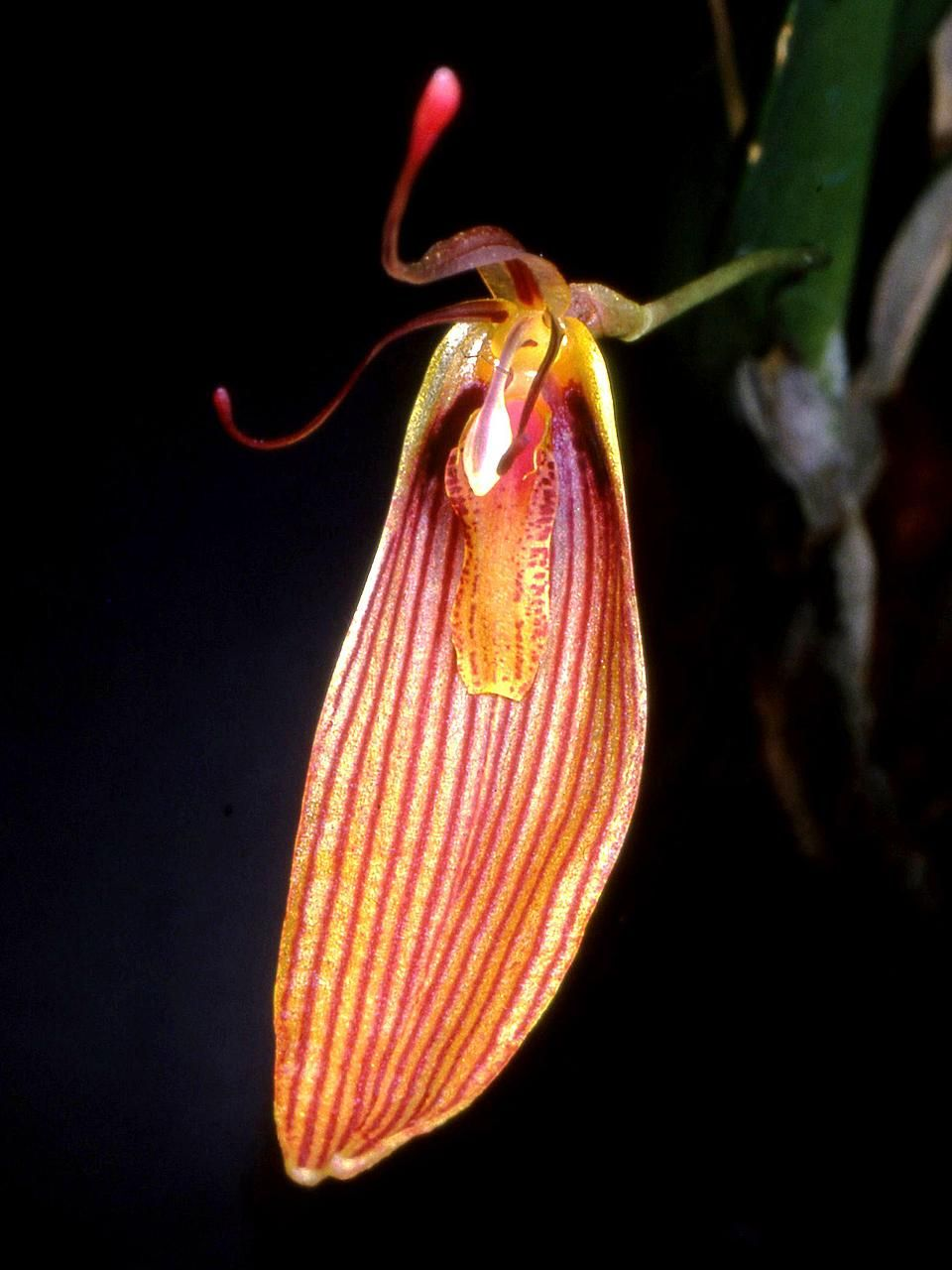
Restrepia

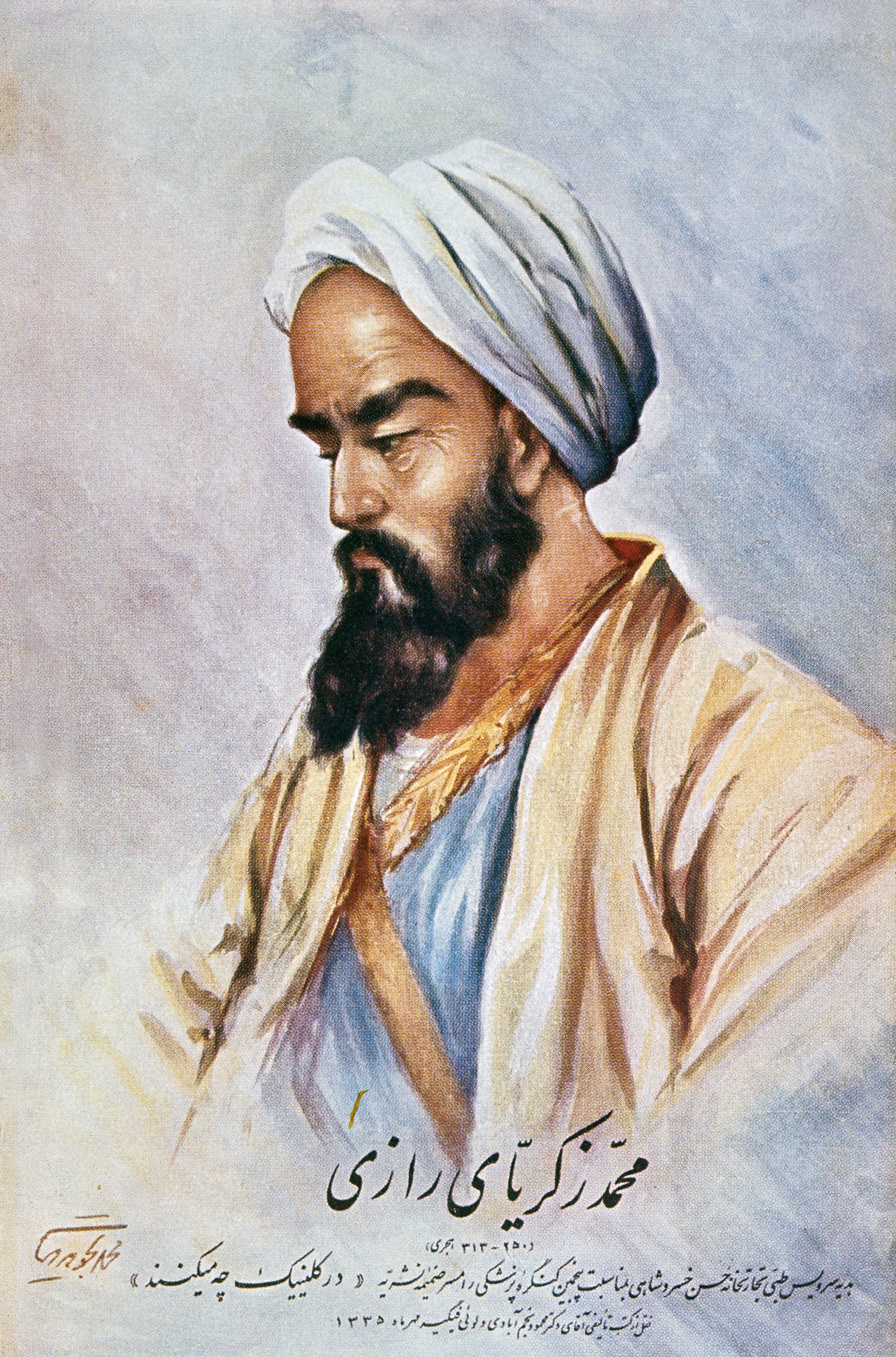
Portrait of Muhammad ibn Zakariya al-Razi

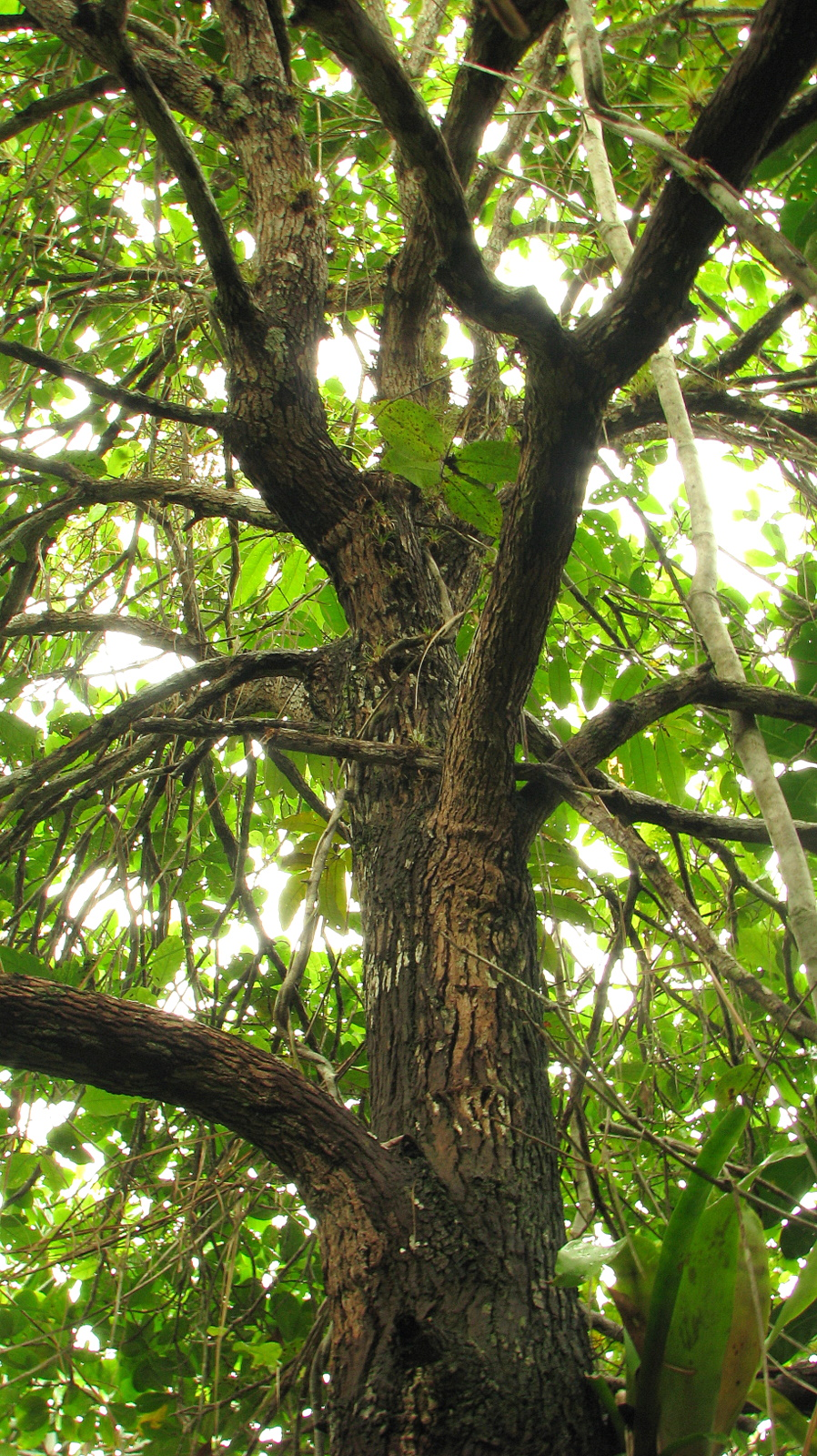
Richeria

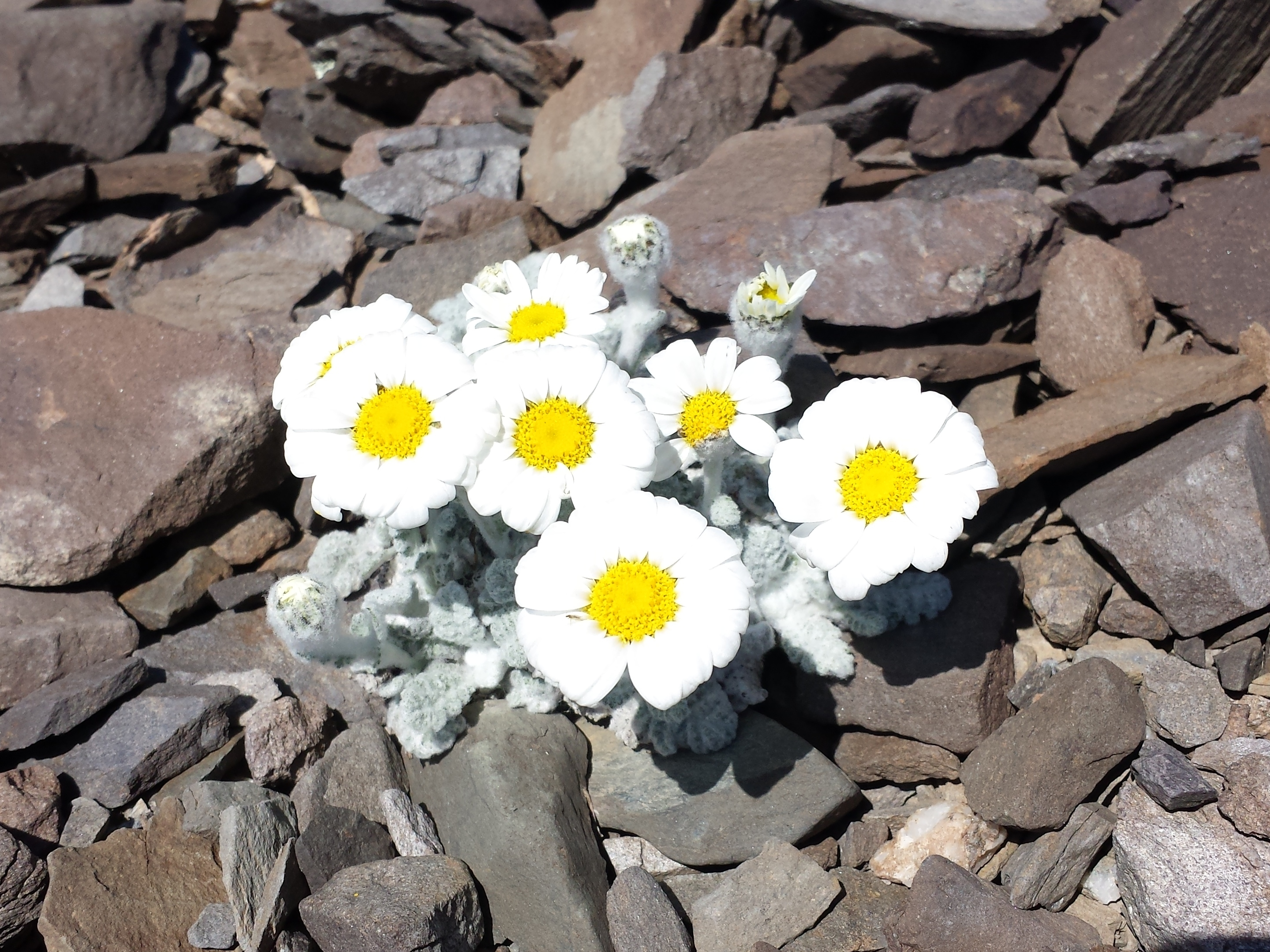
Richteria

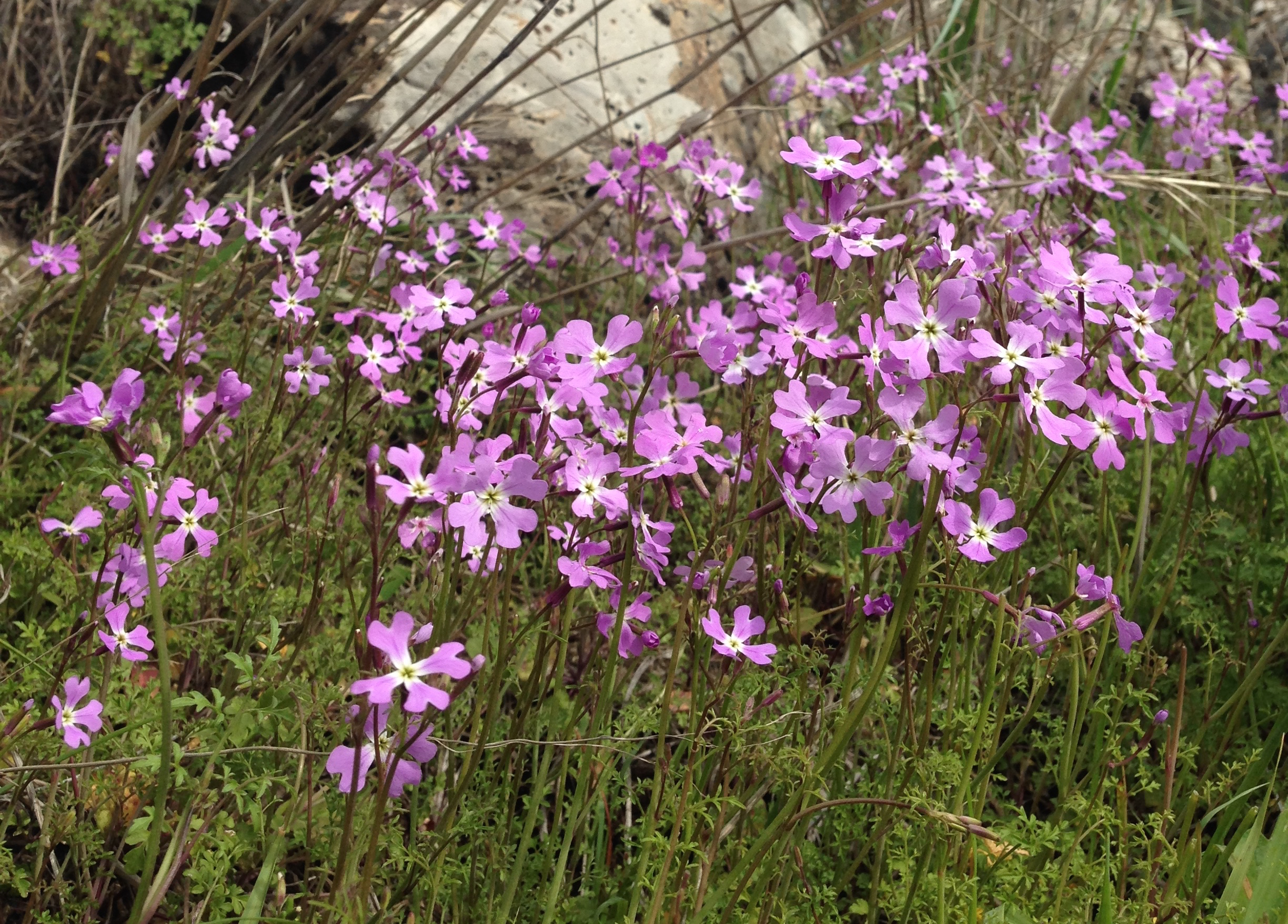
Ricotia

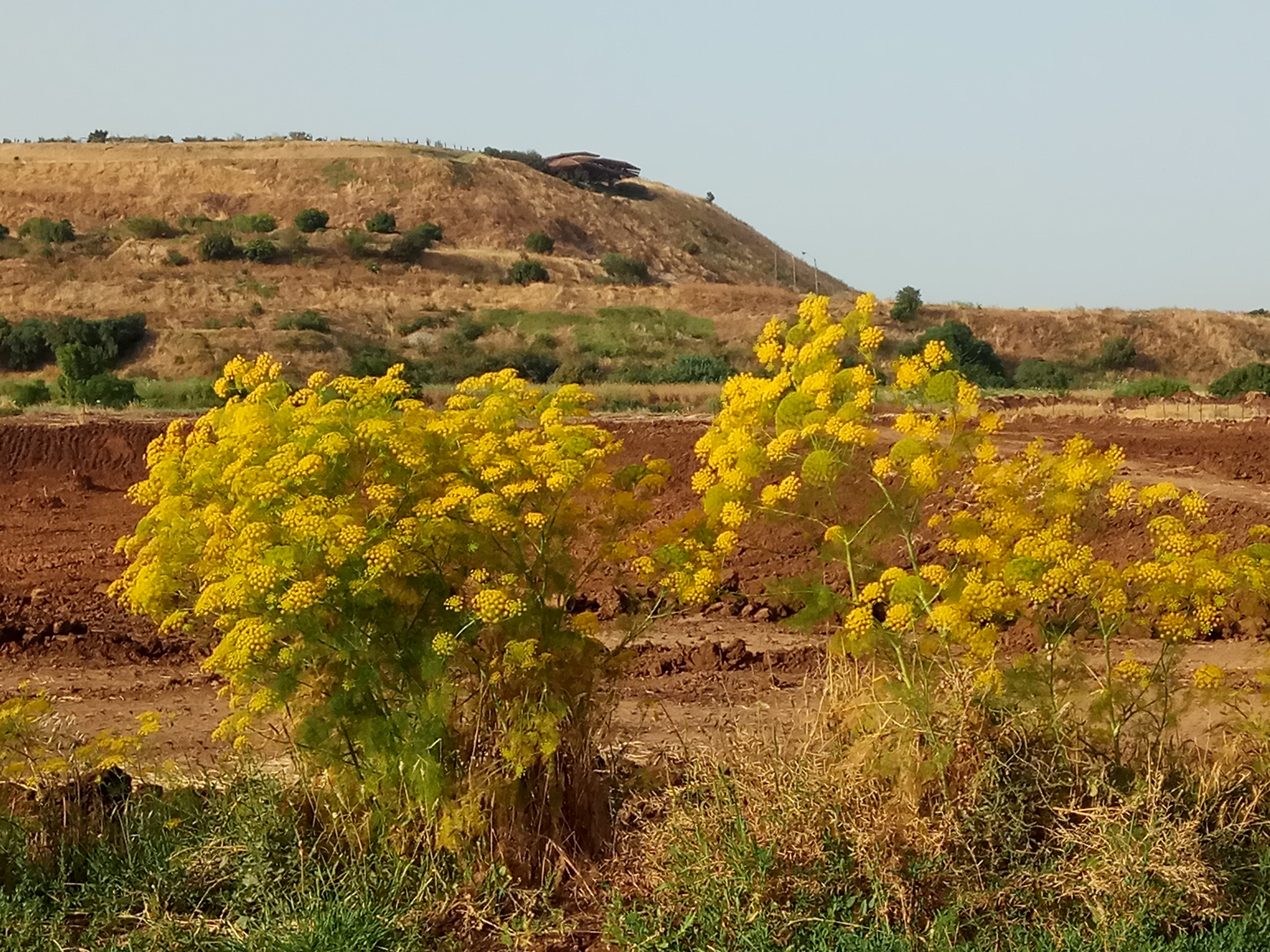
Ridolfia

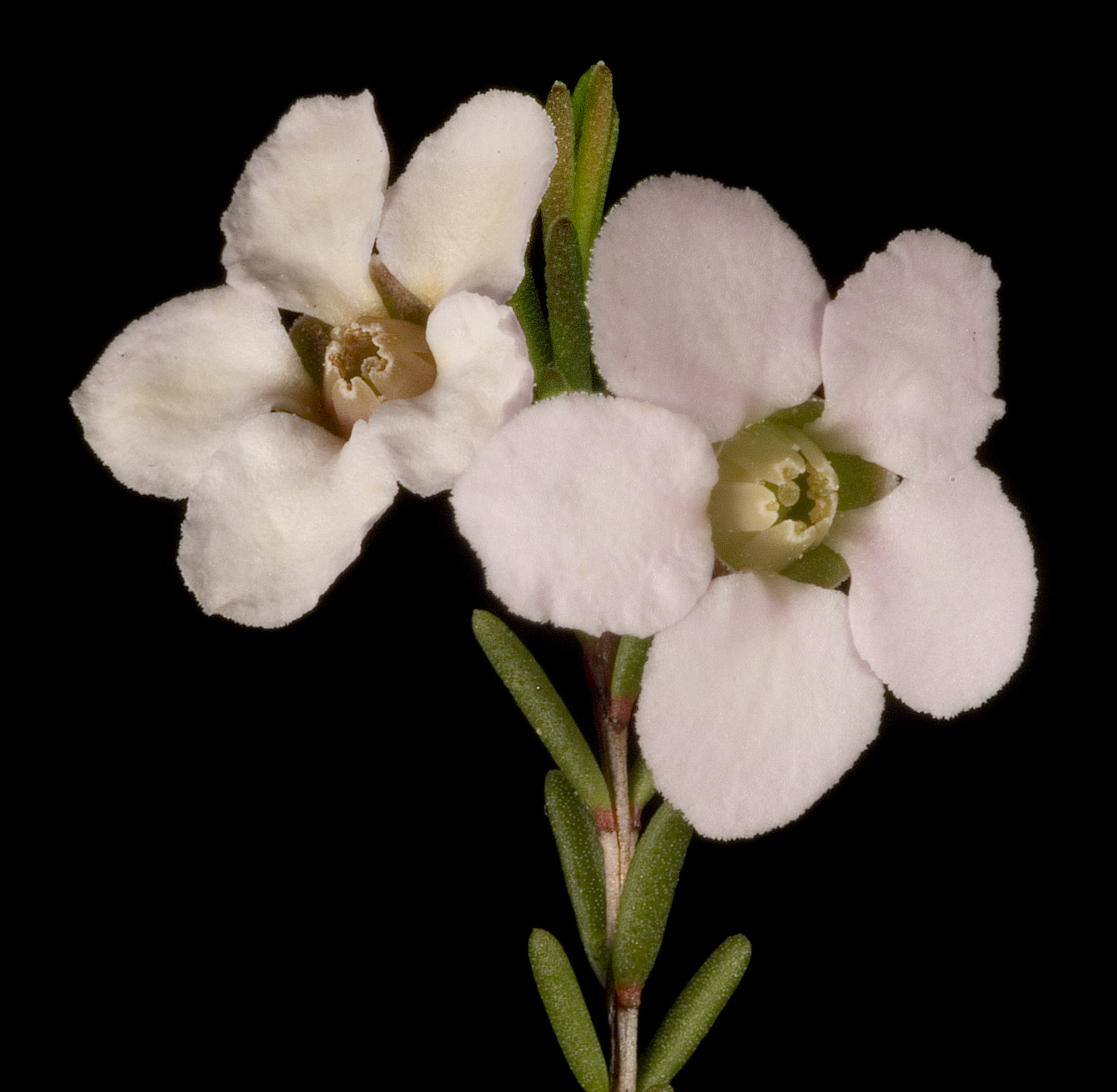
Rinzia

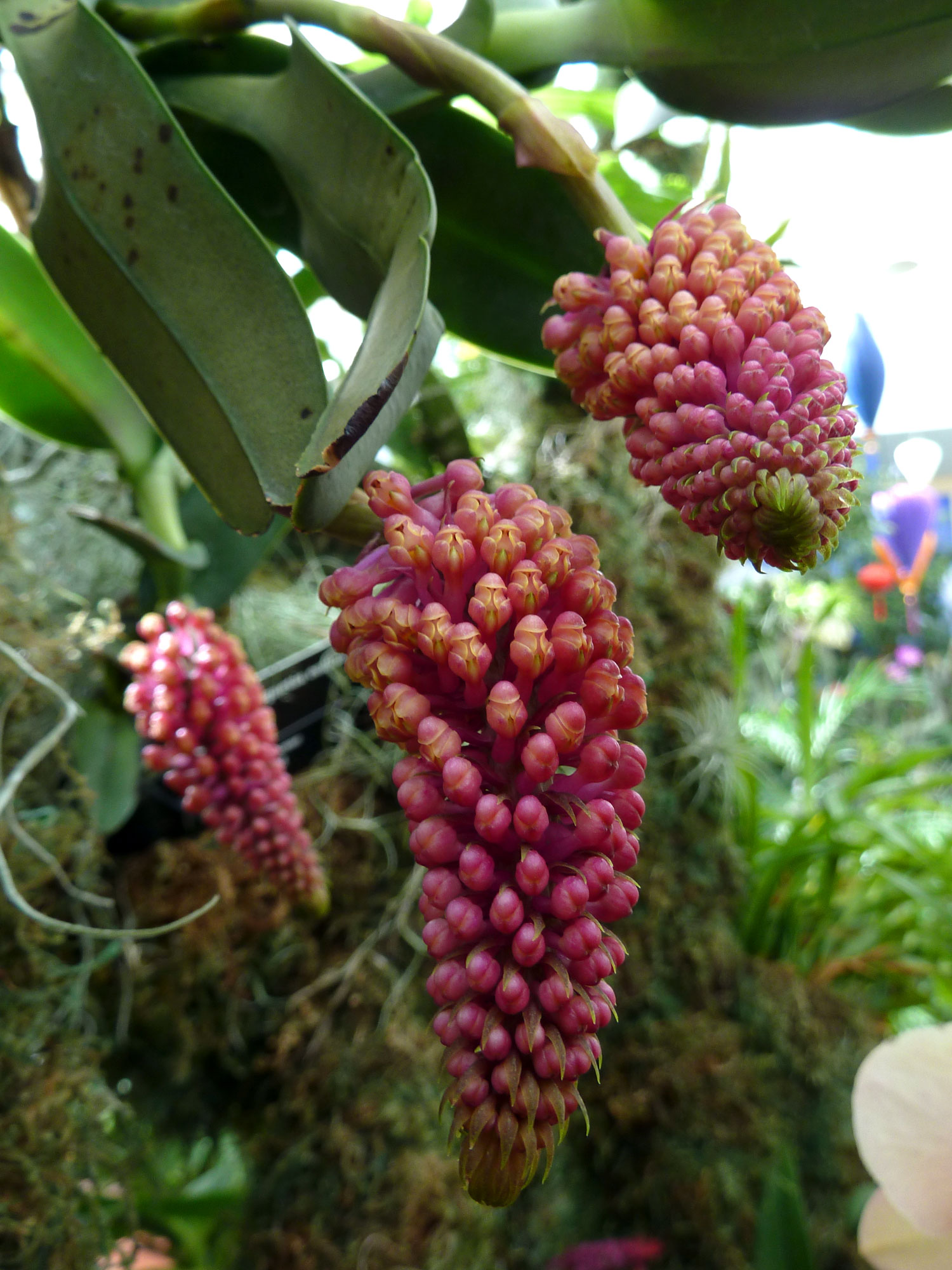
Robiquetia

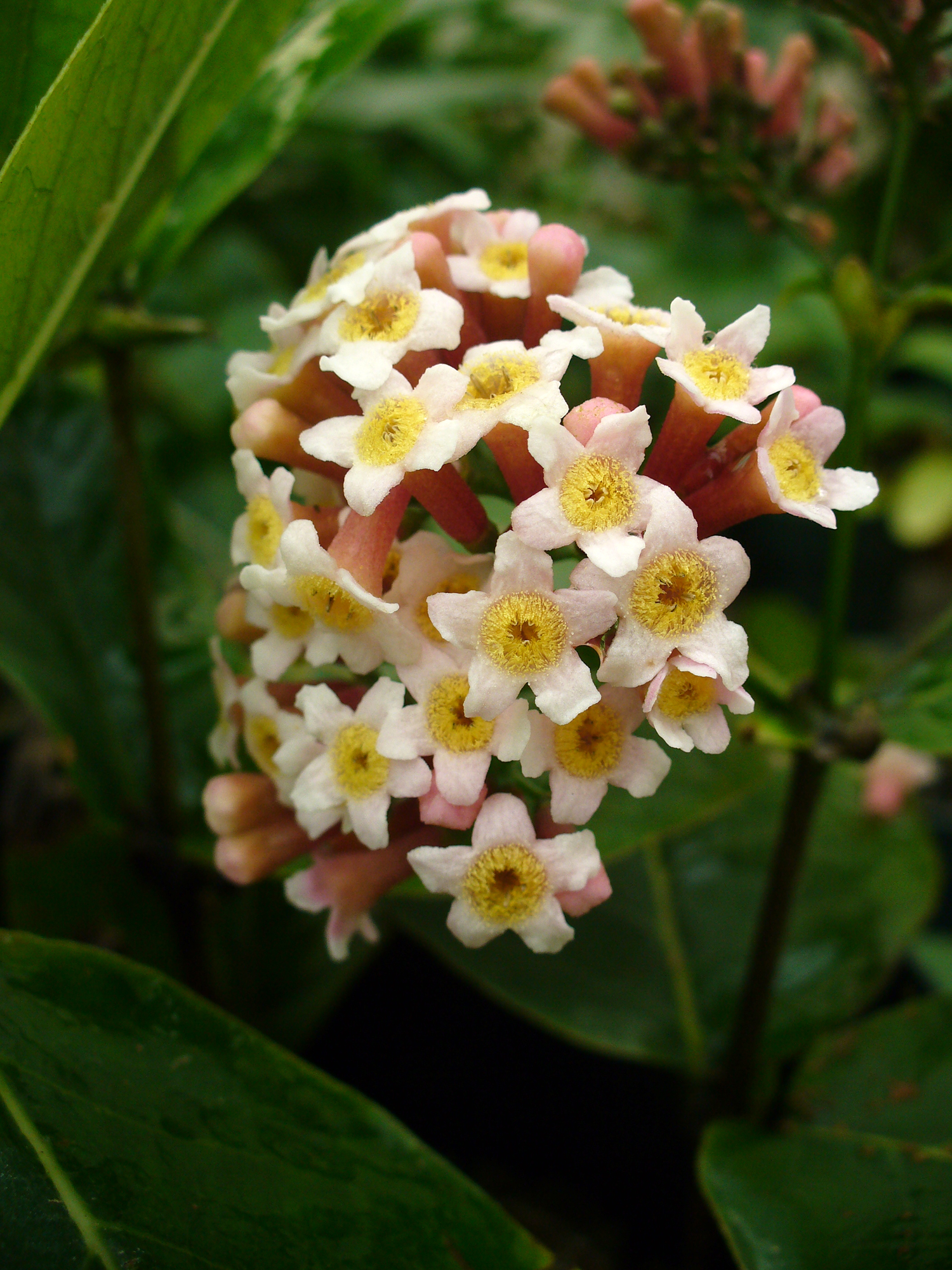
Rogiera

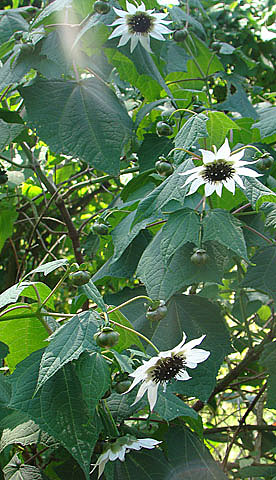
Rojasianthe

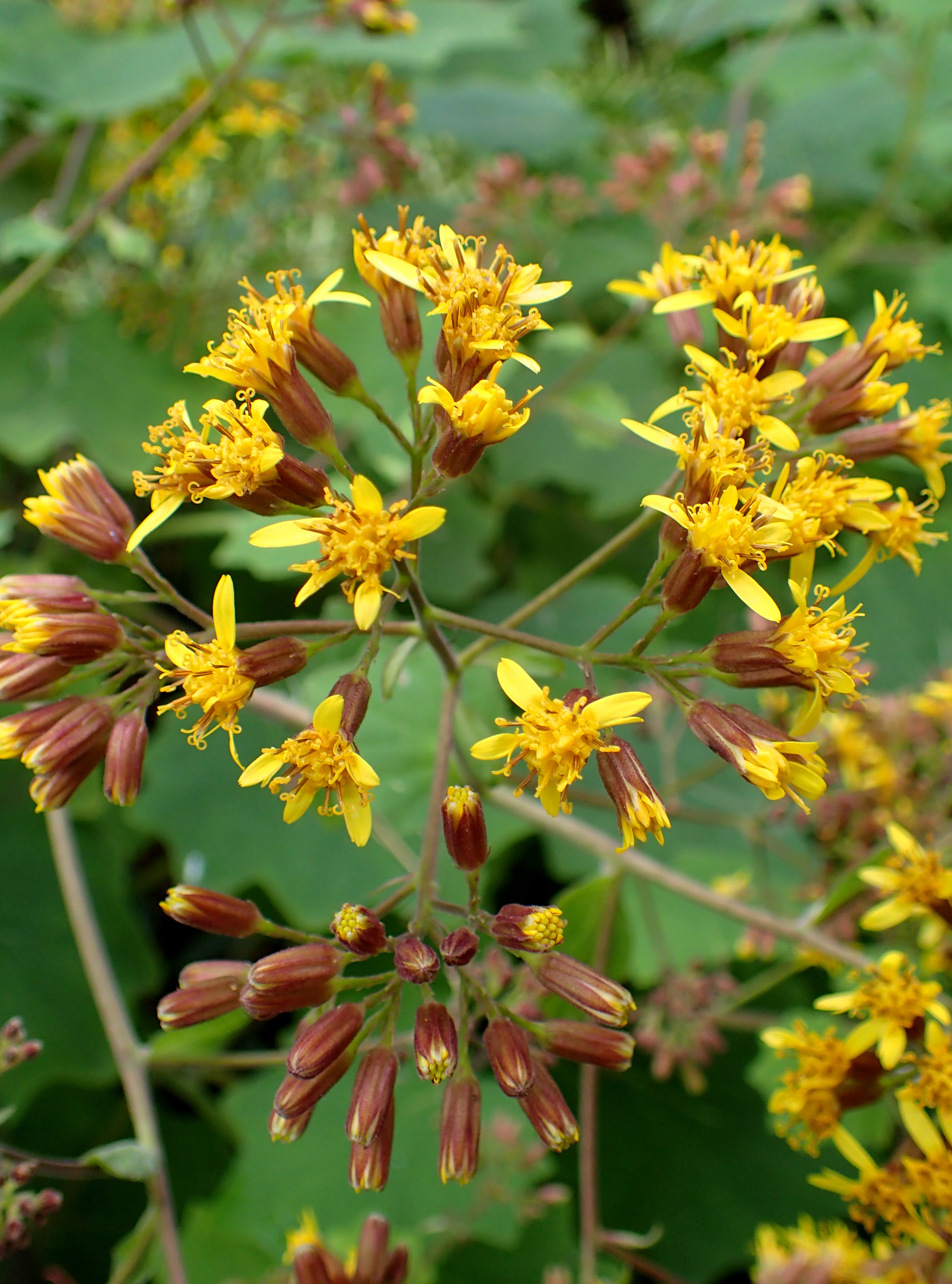
Roldana

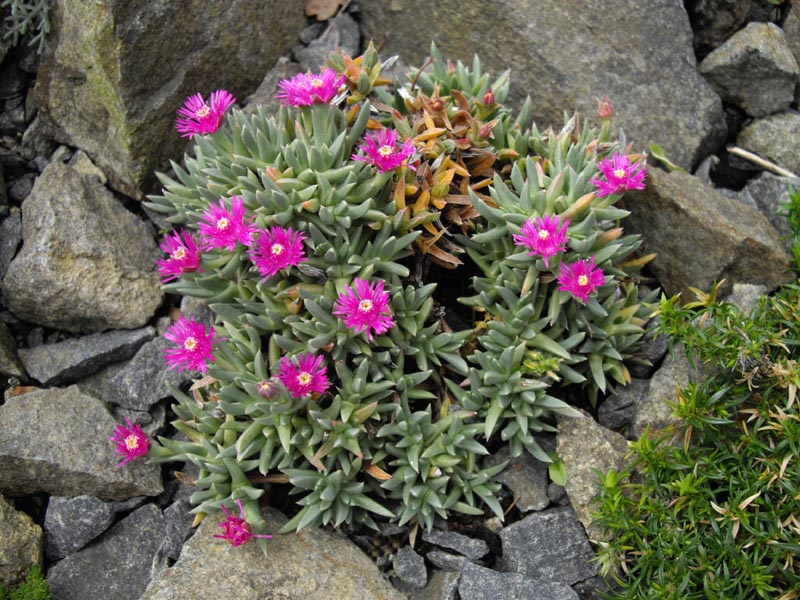
Ruschia

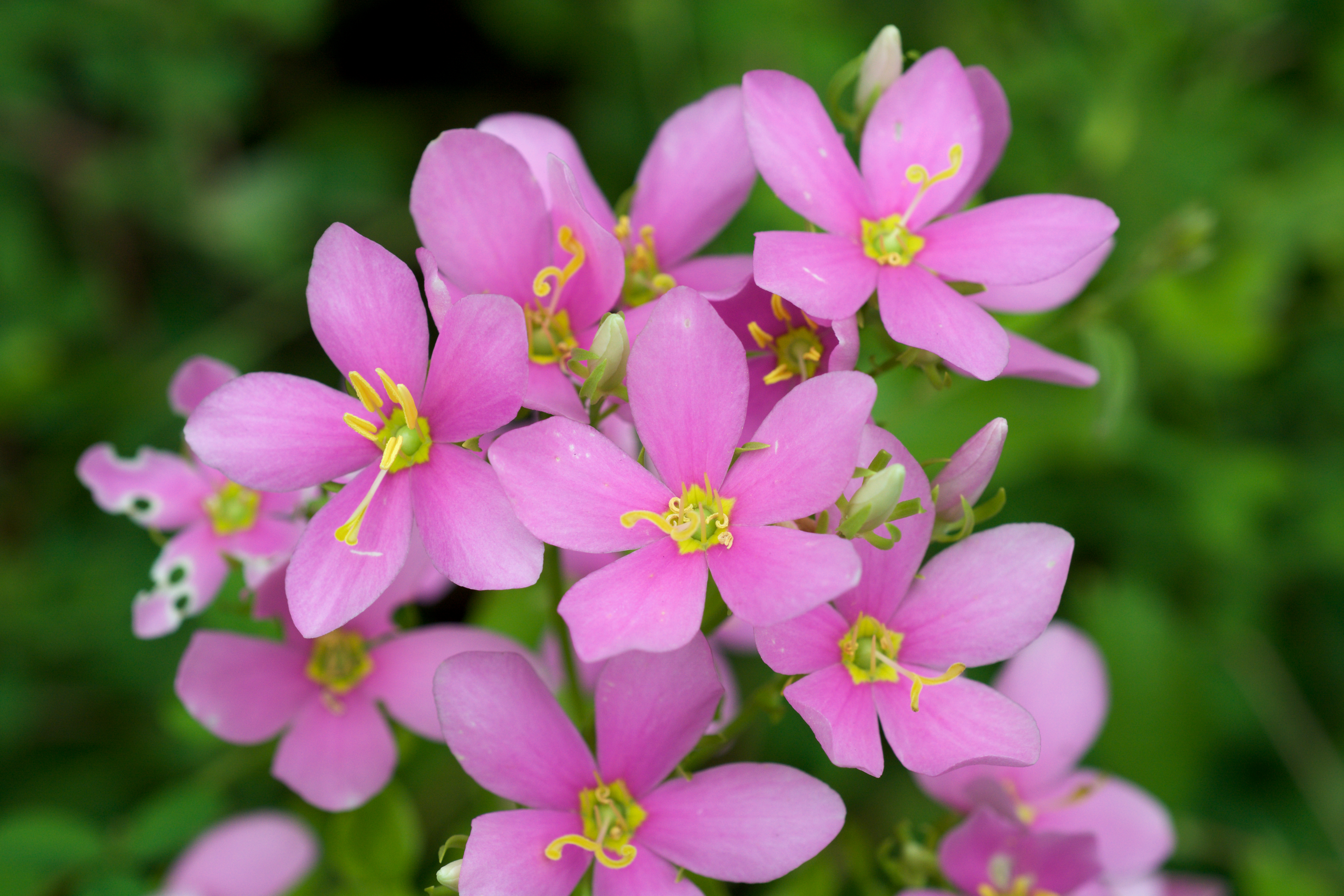
Sabatia

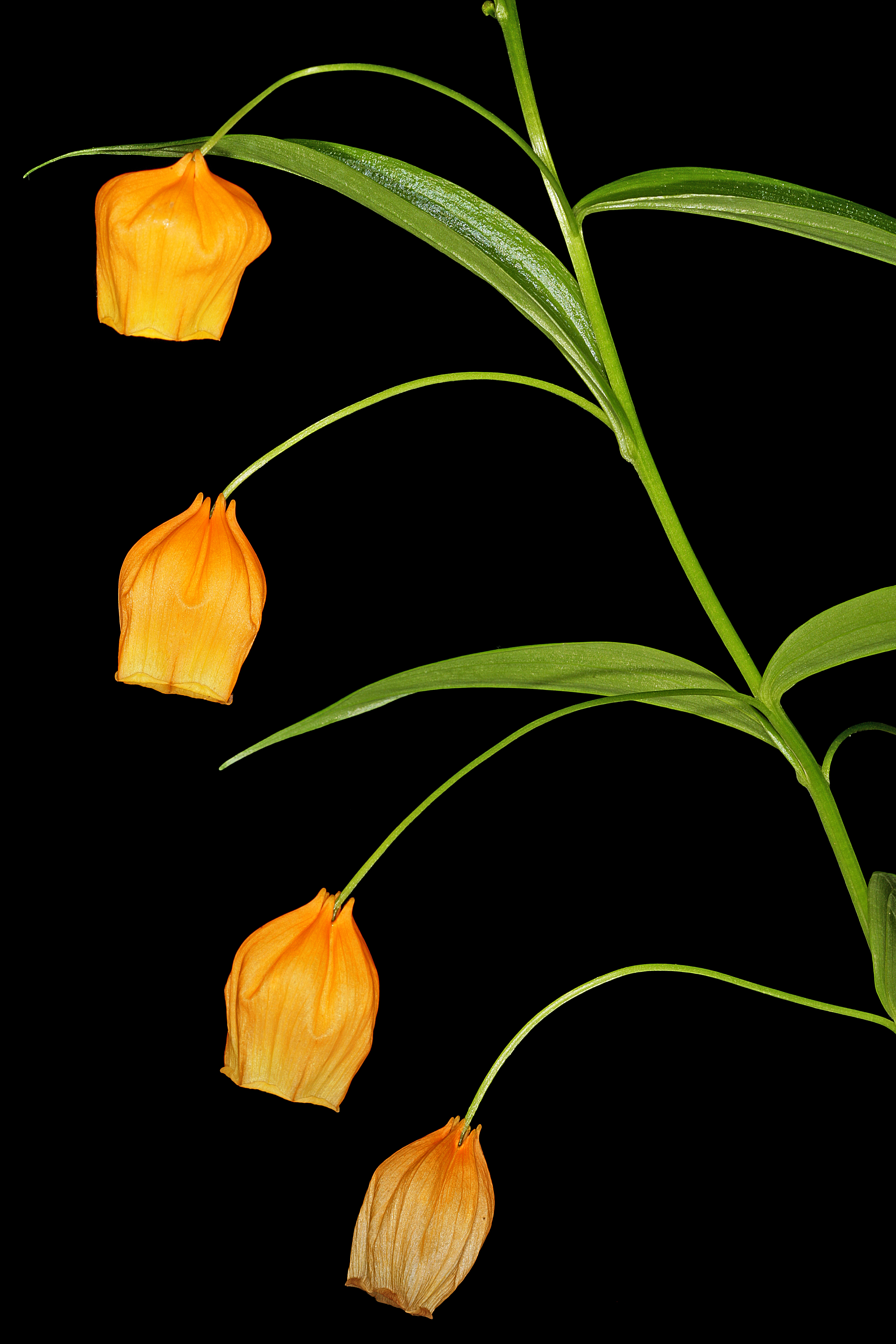
Sandersonia

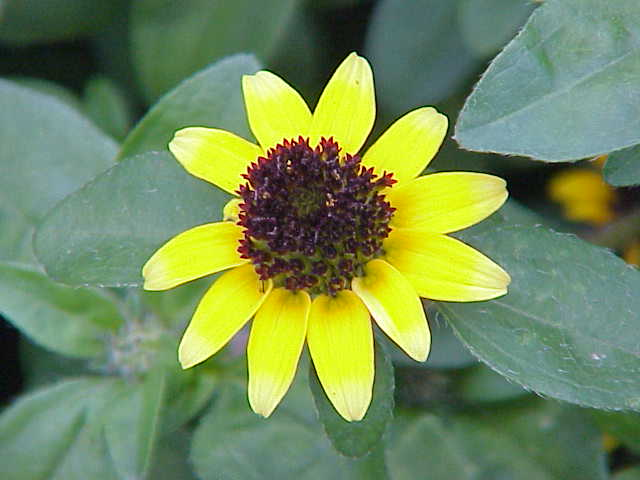
Sanvitalia

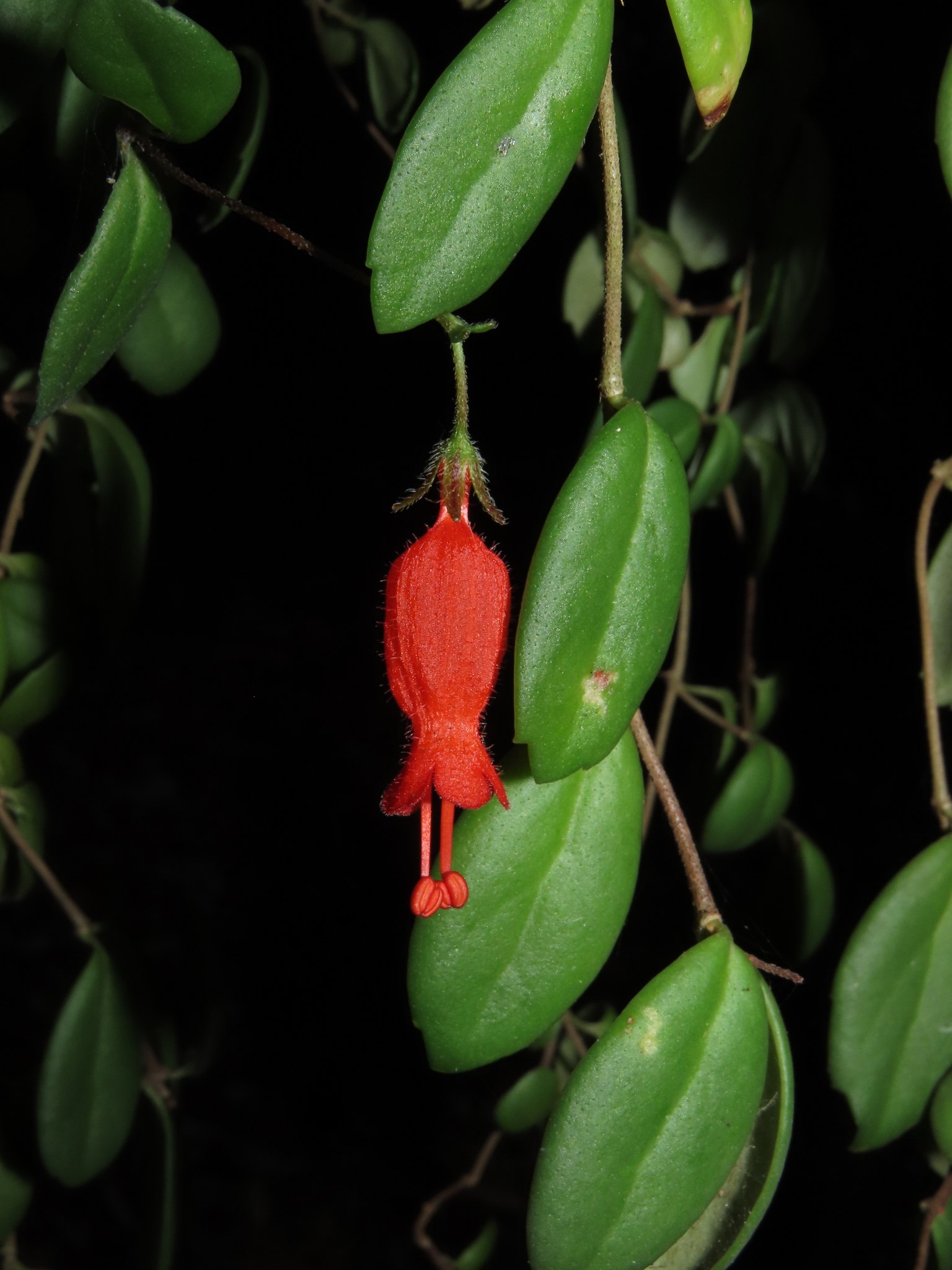
Sarmienta

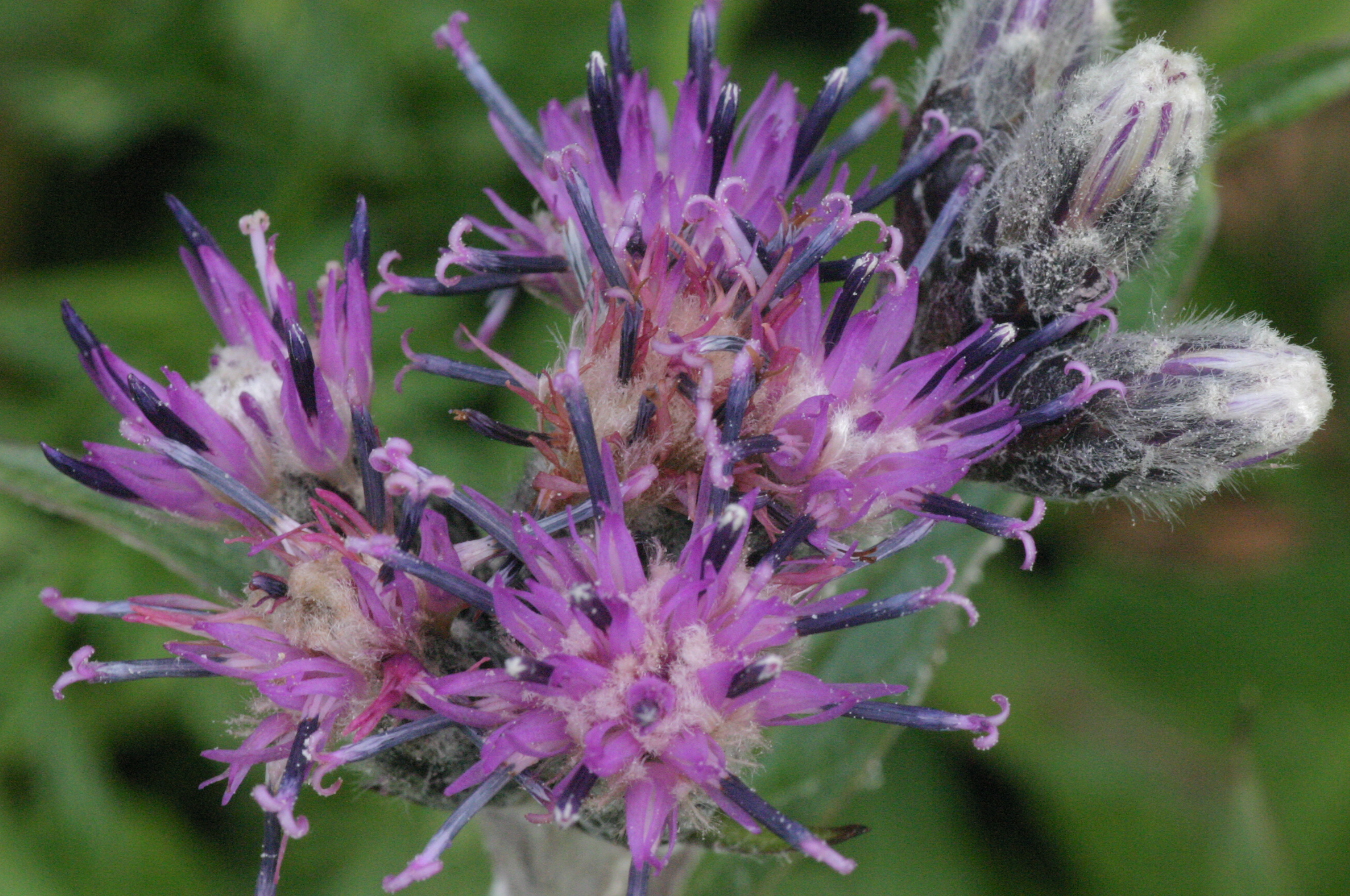
Saussurea

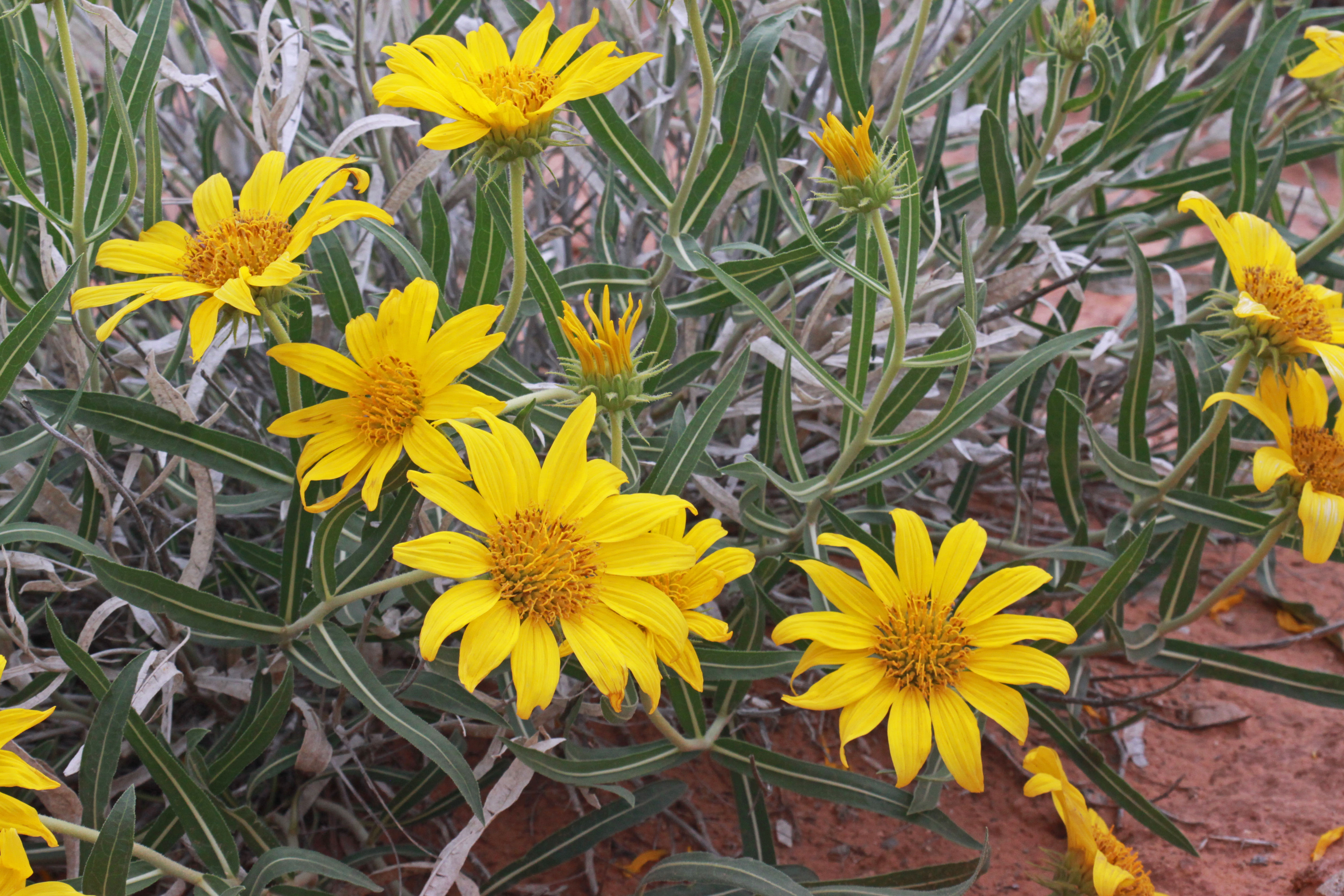
Scabrethia

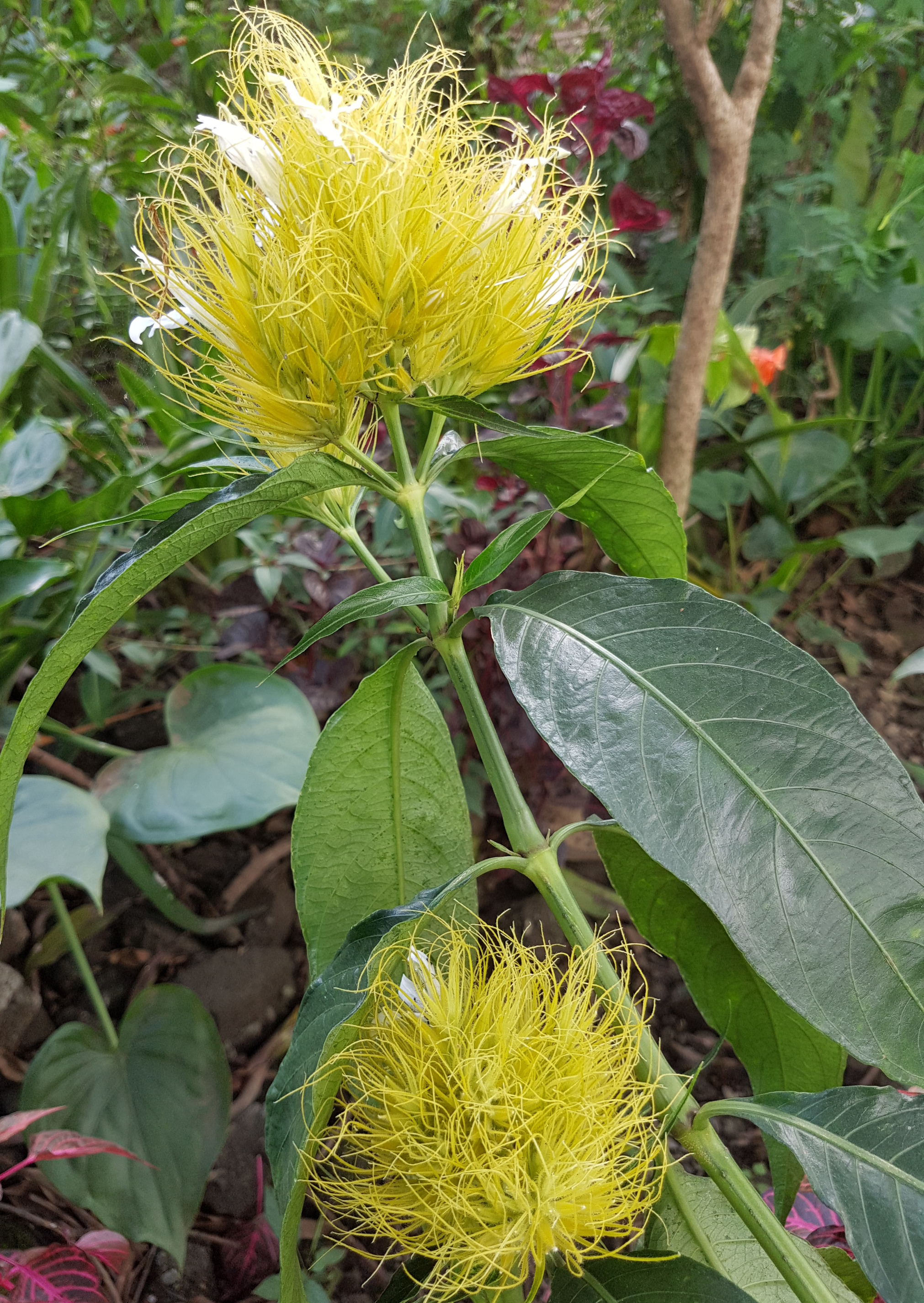
Schaueria

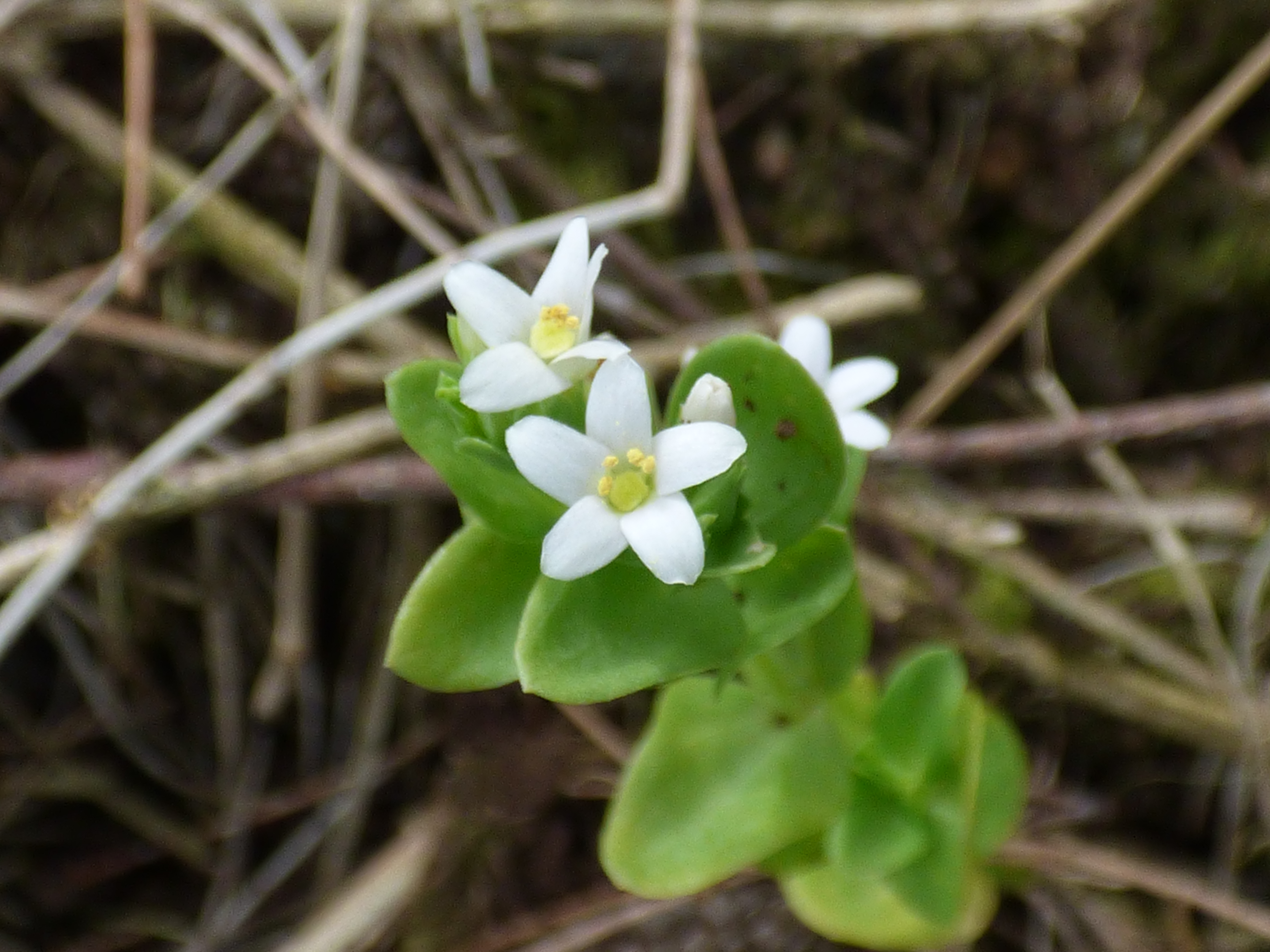
Schenkia

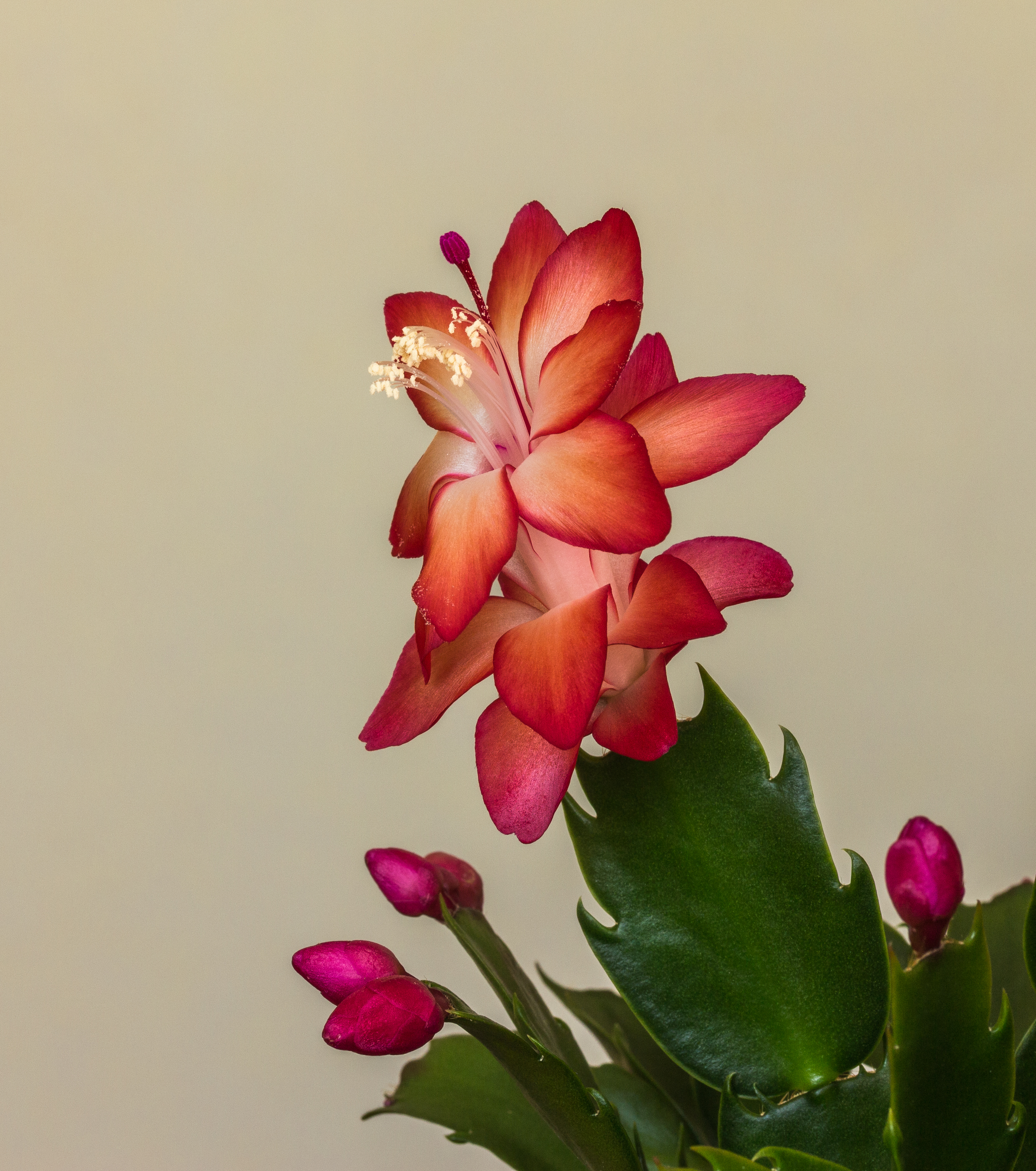
Schlumbergera

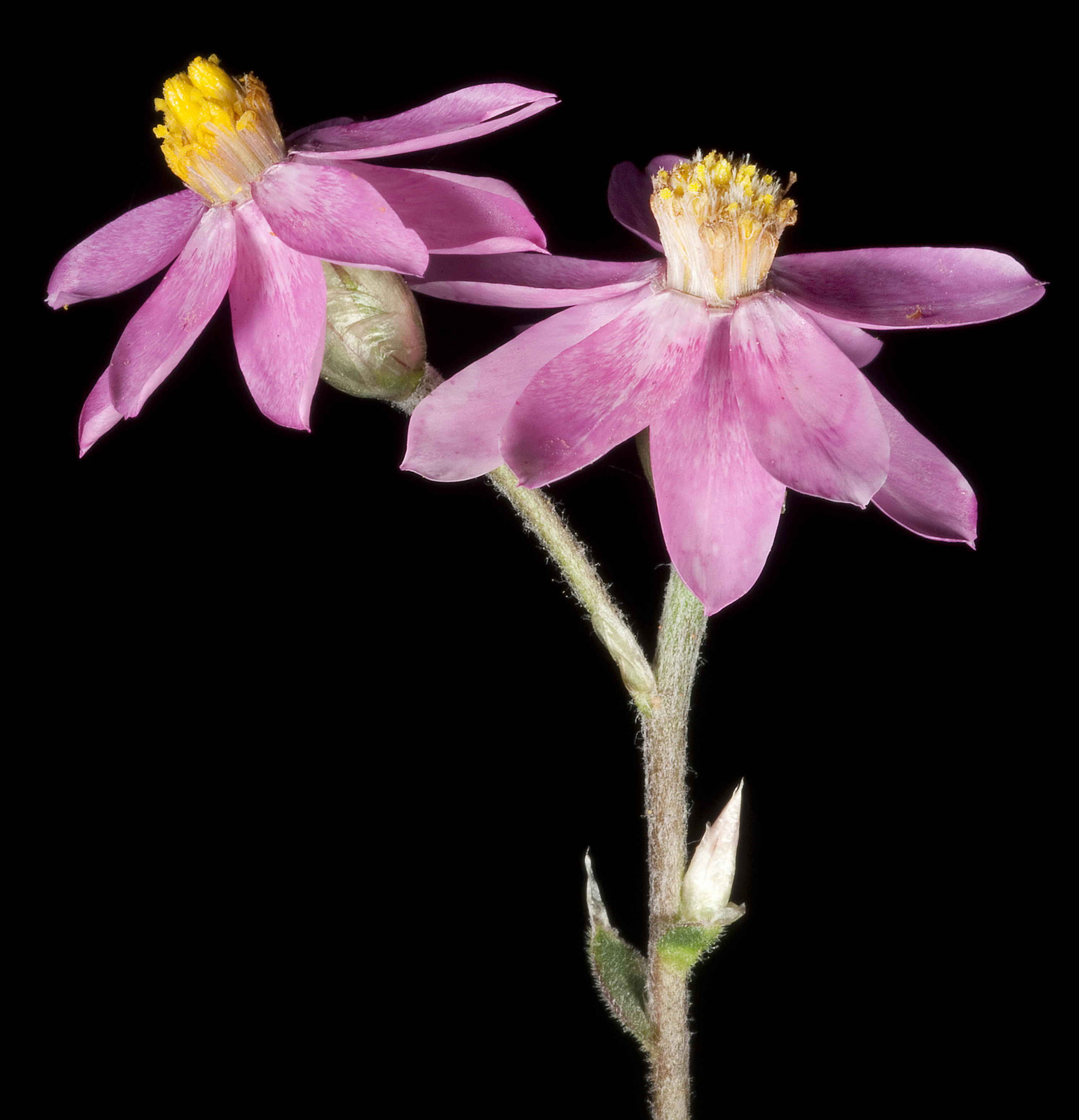
Schoenia

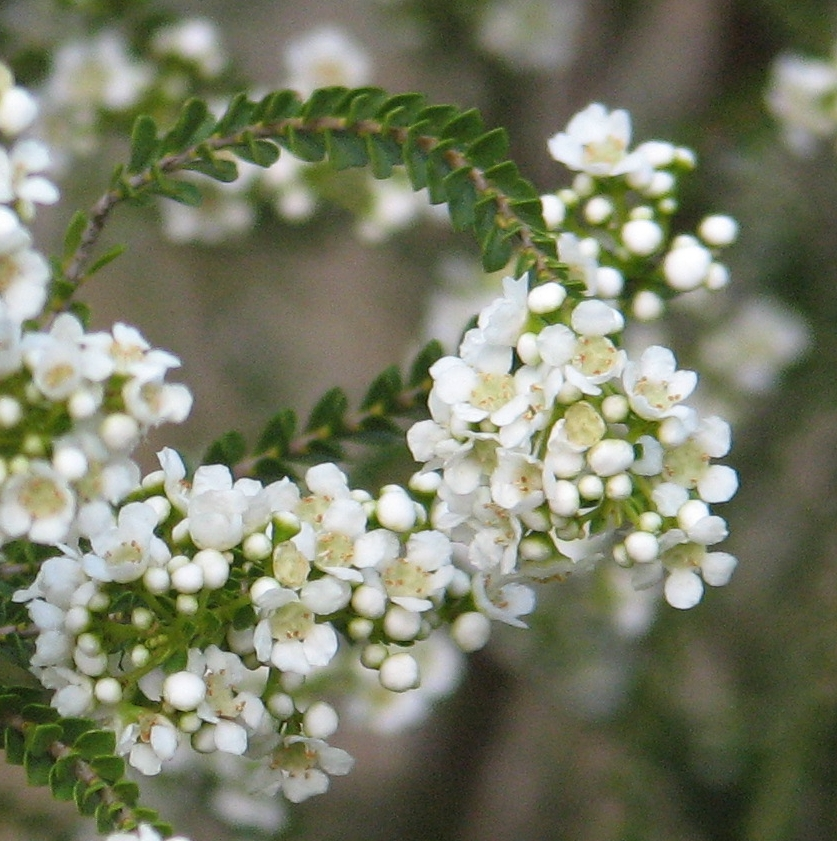
Scholtzia

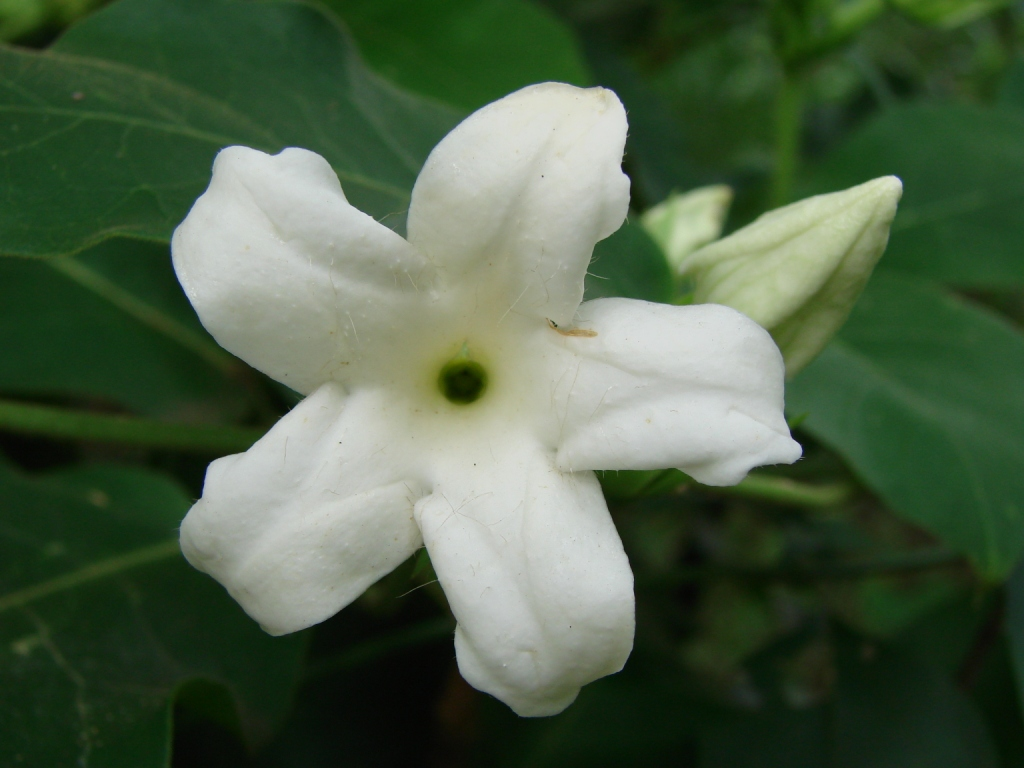
Schubertia

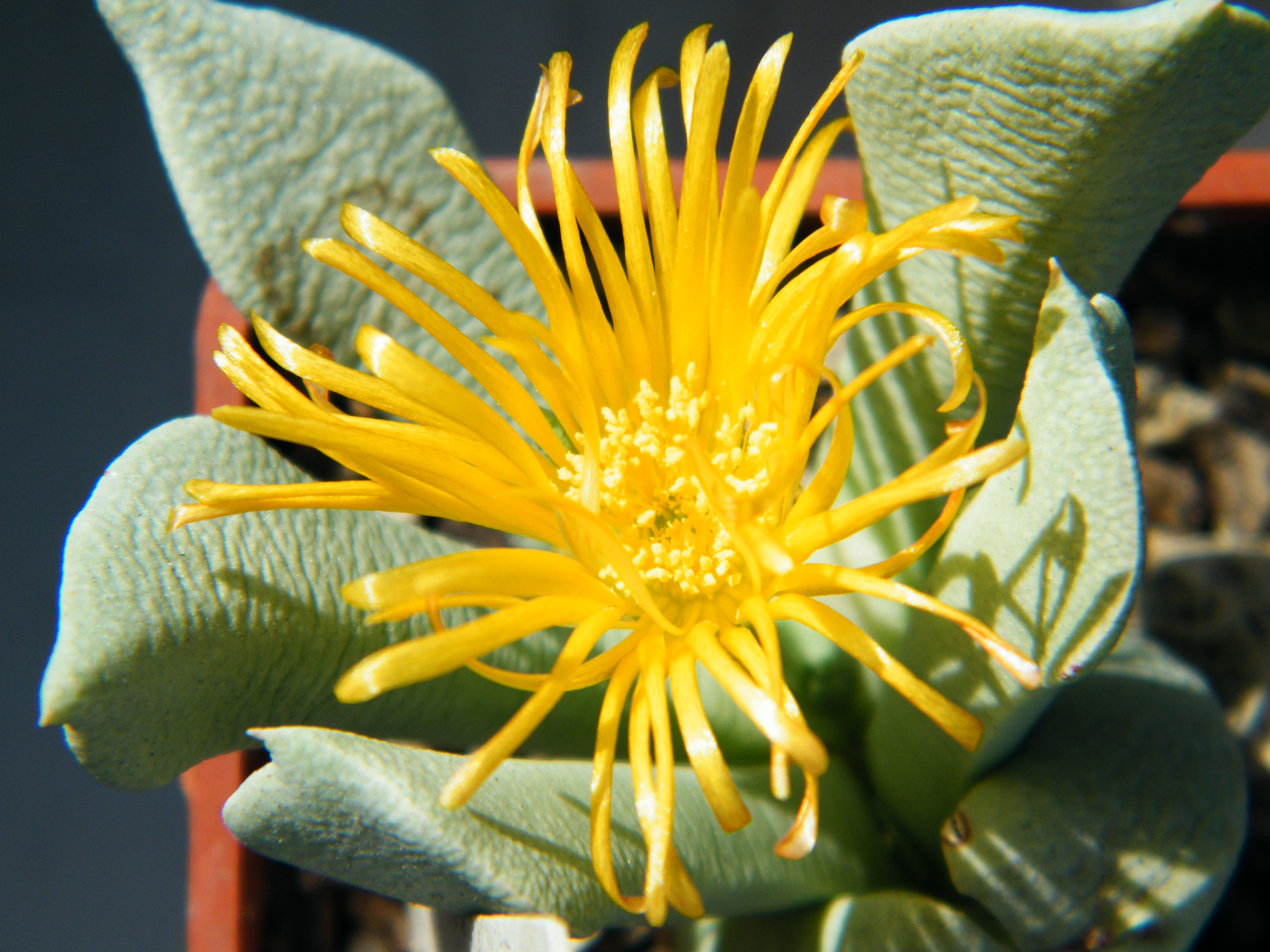
Schwantesia

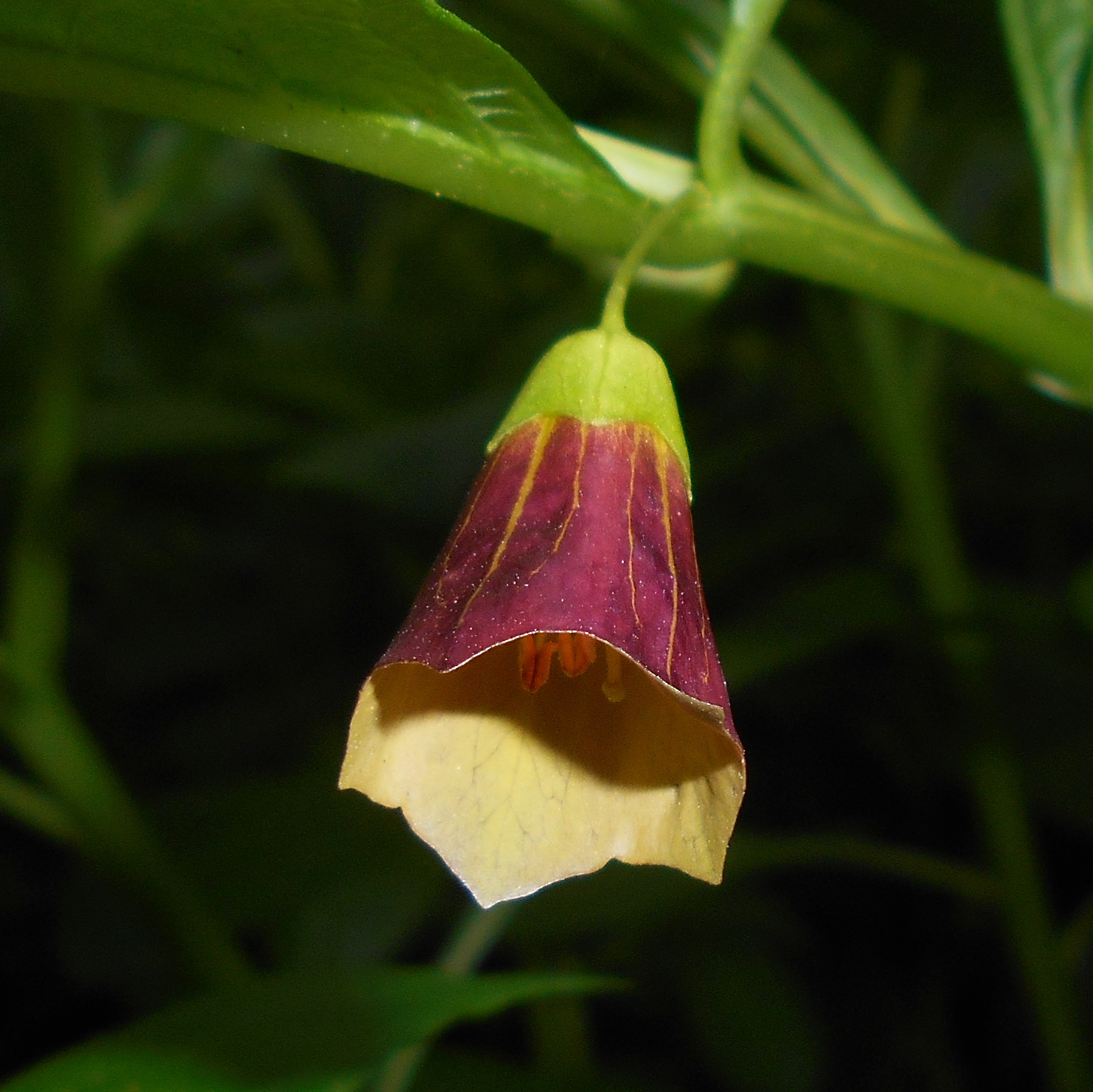
Scopolia

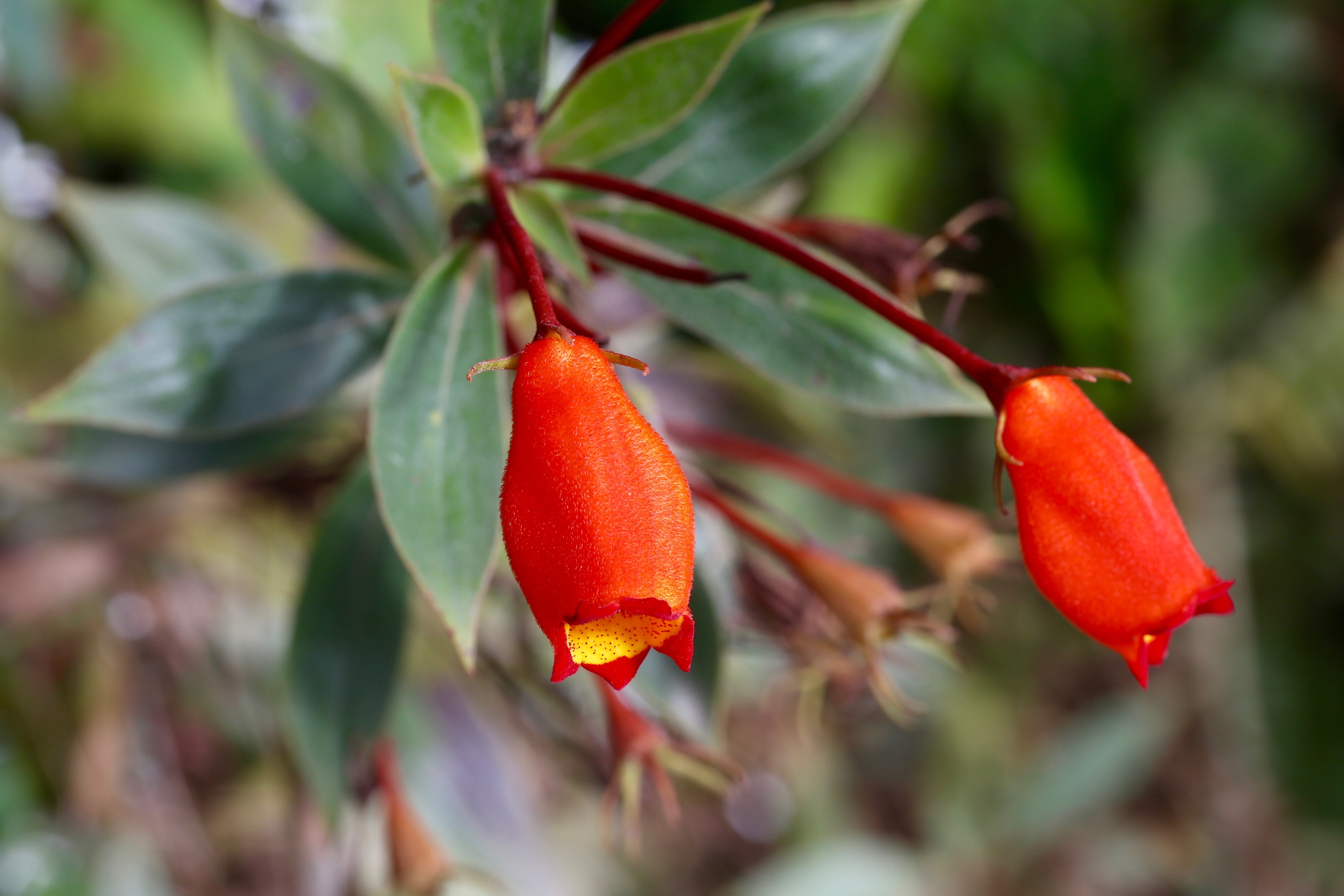
Seemannia

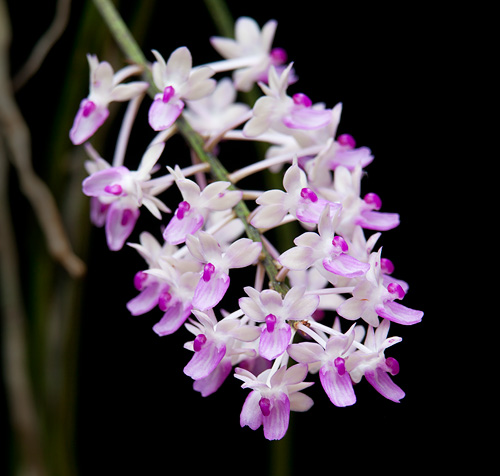
Seidenfadenia

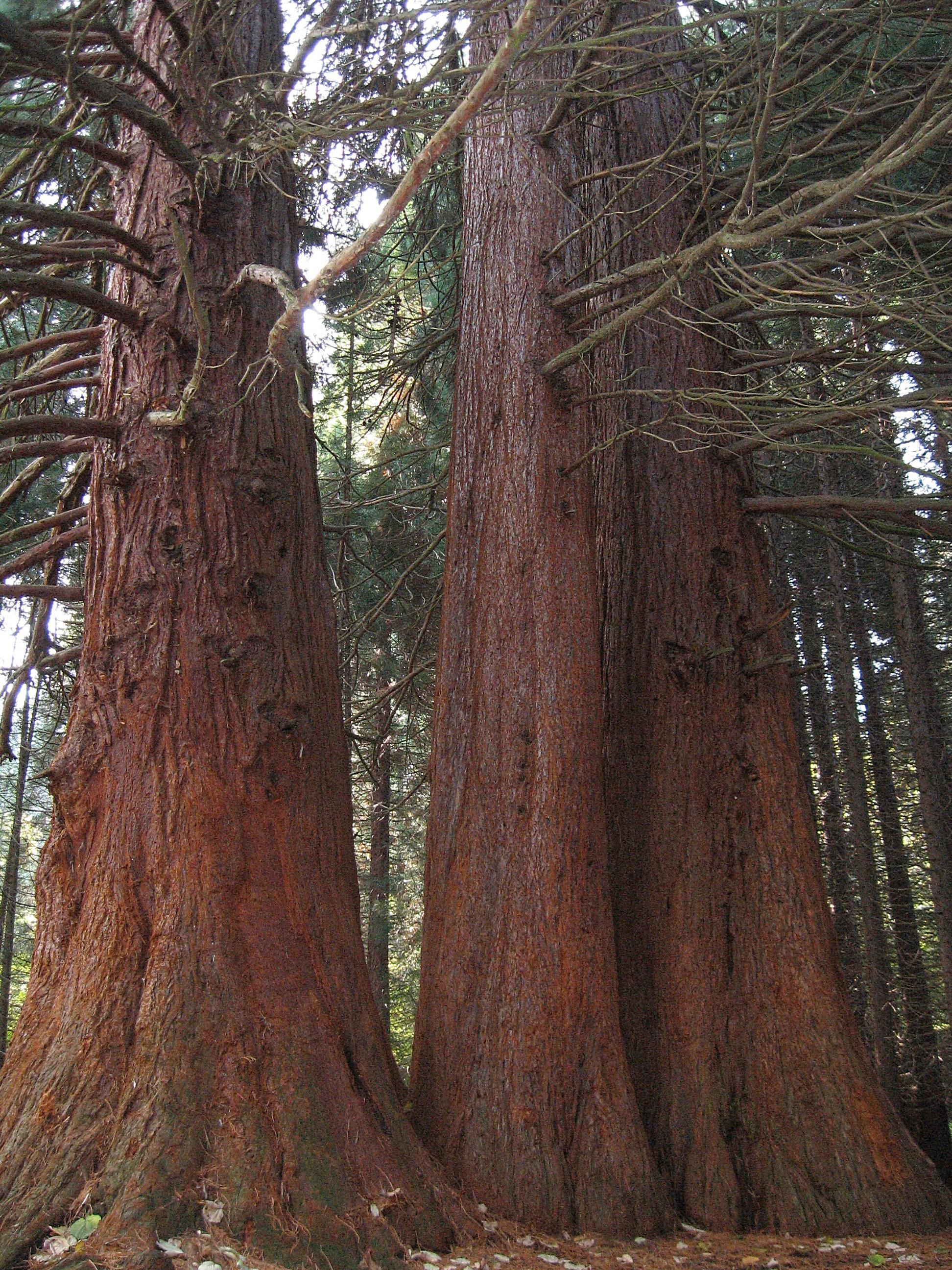
Sequoiadendron

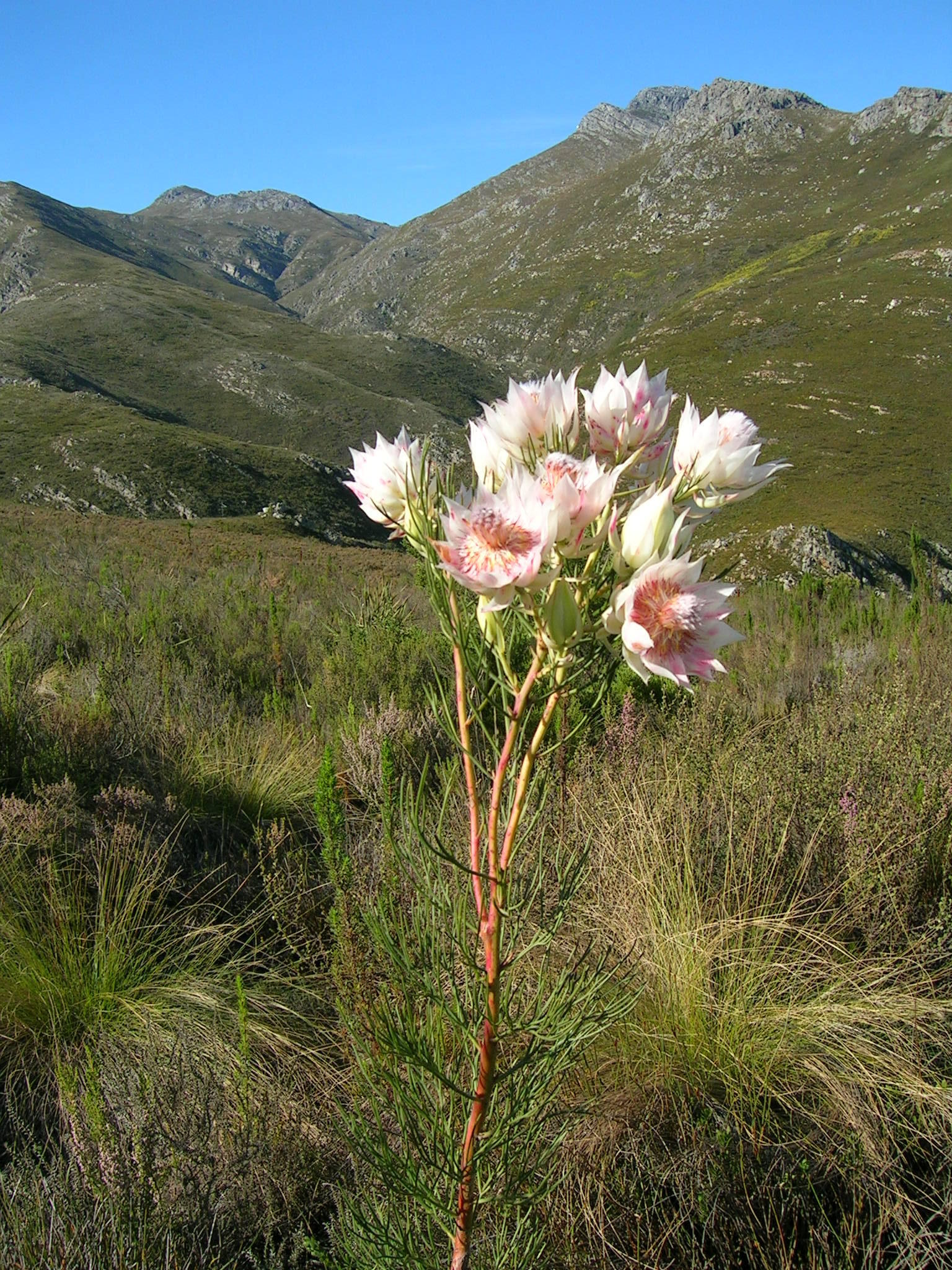
Serruria

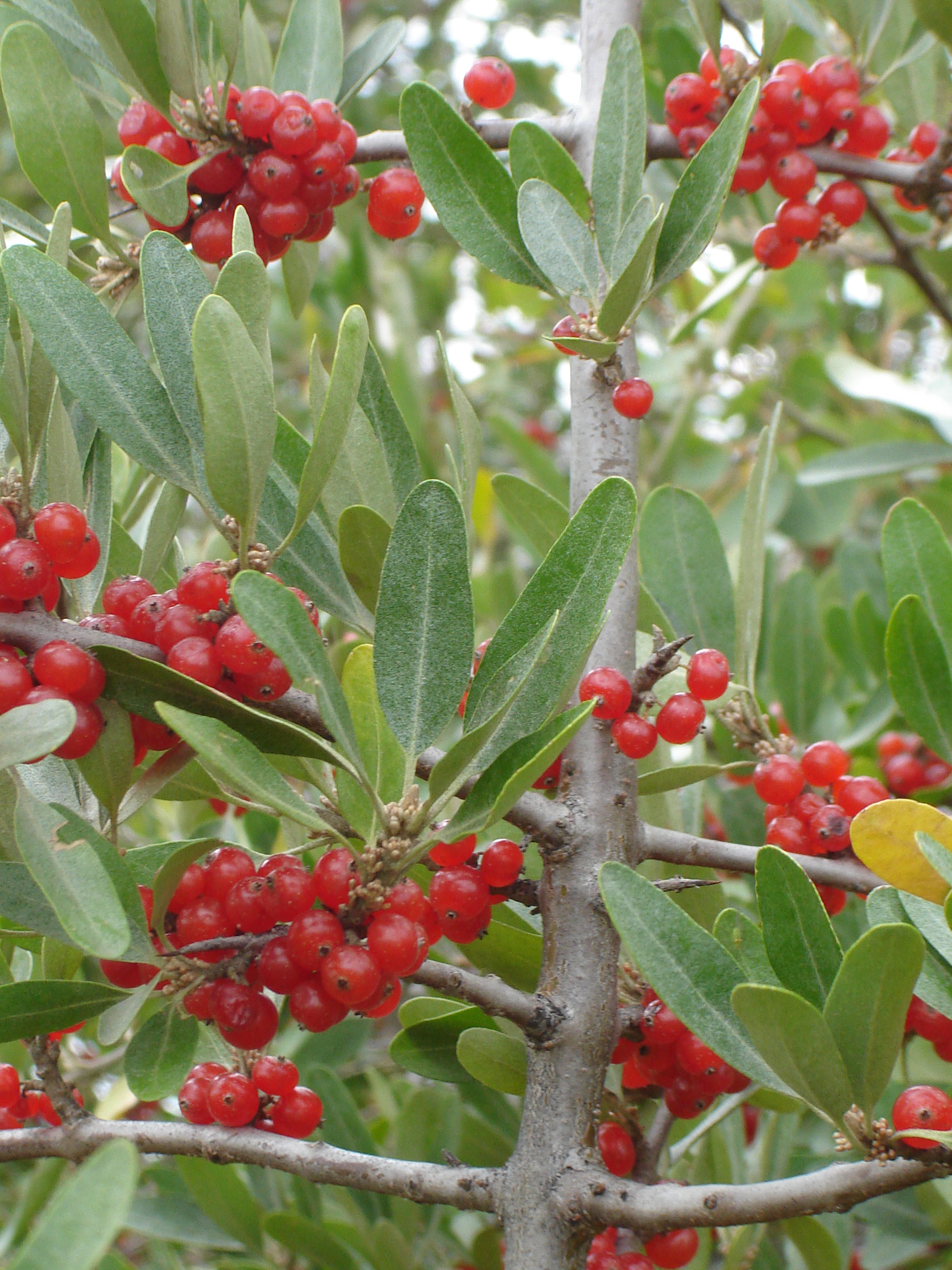
Shepherdia

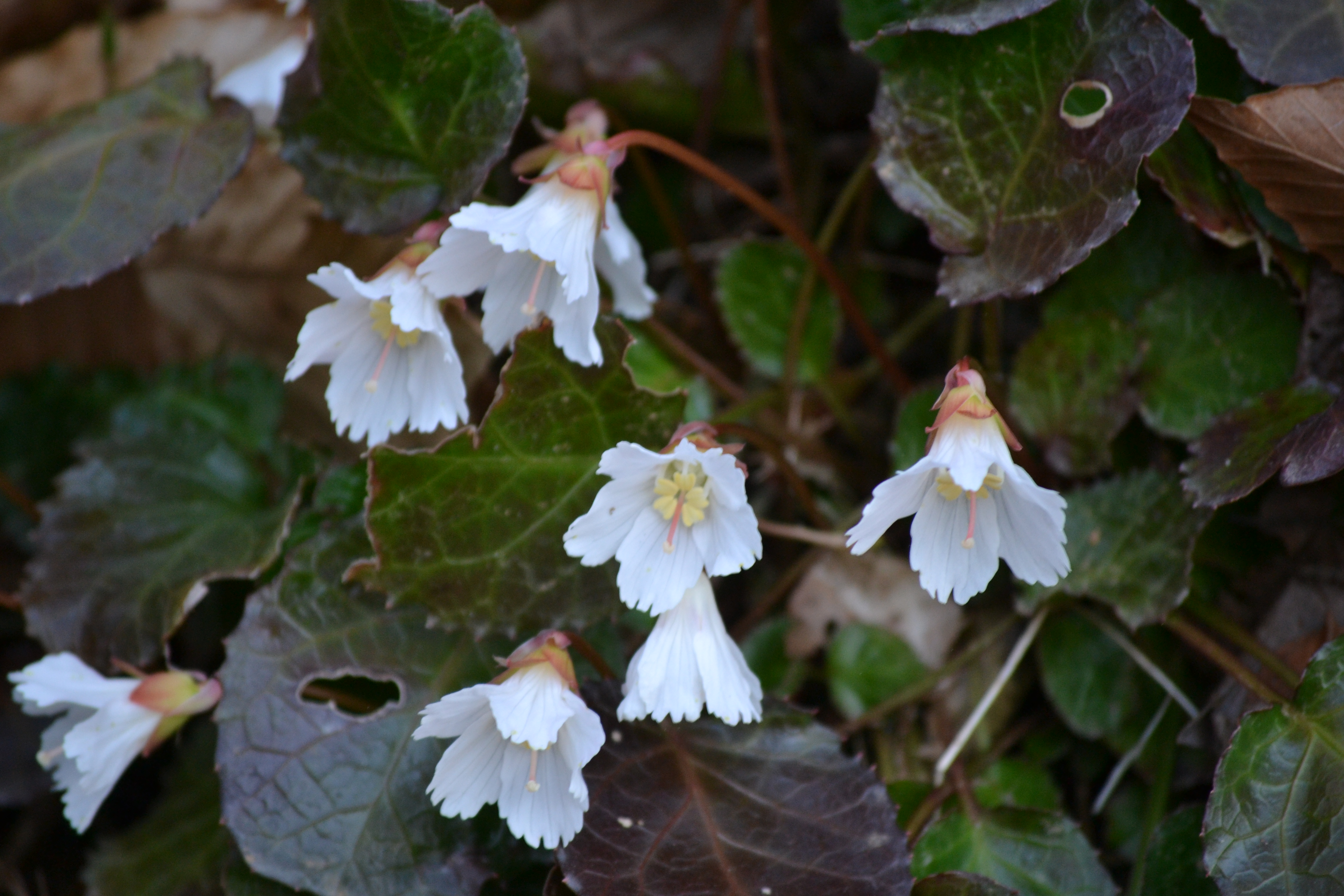
Shortia

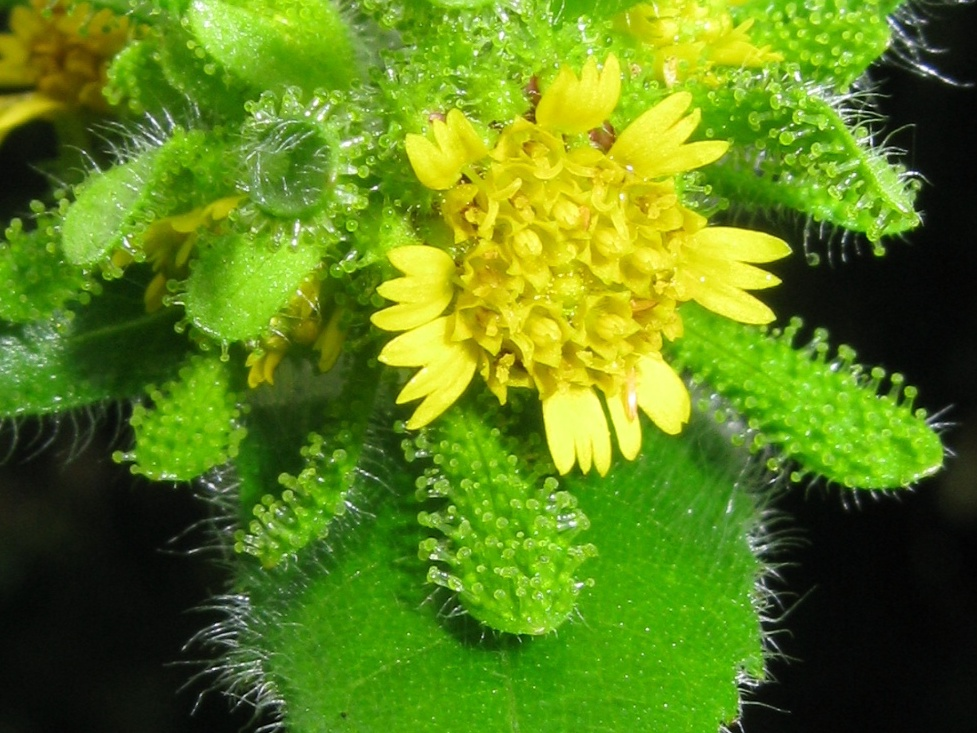
Sigesbeckia

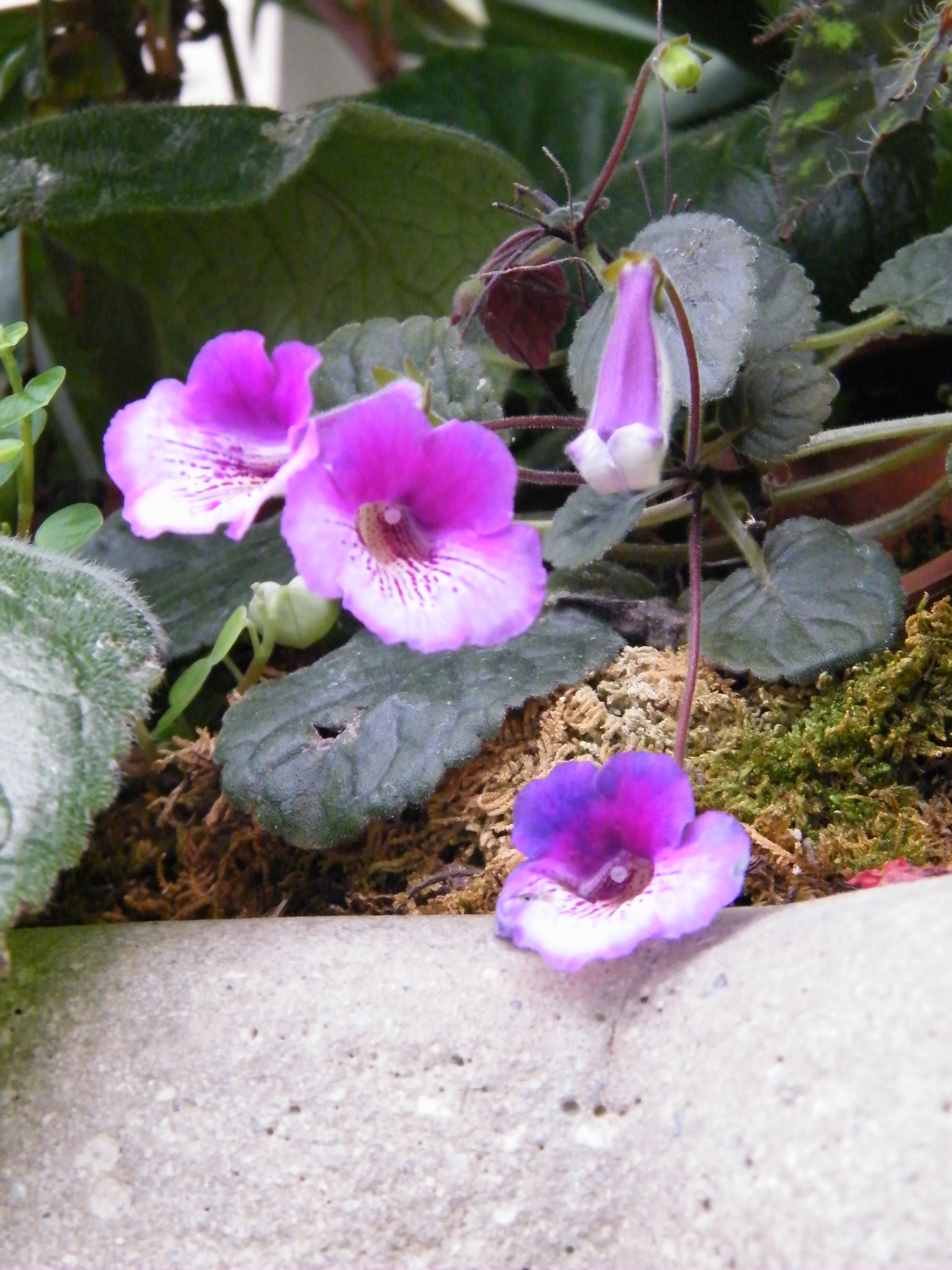
Sinningia

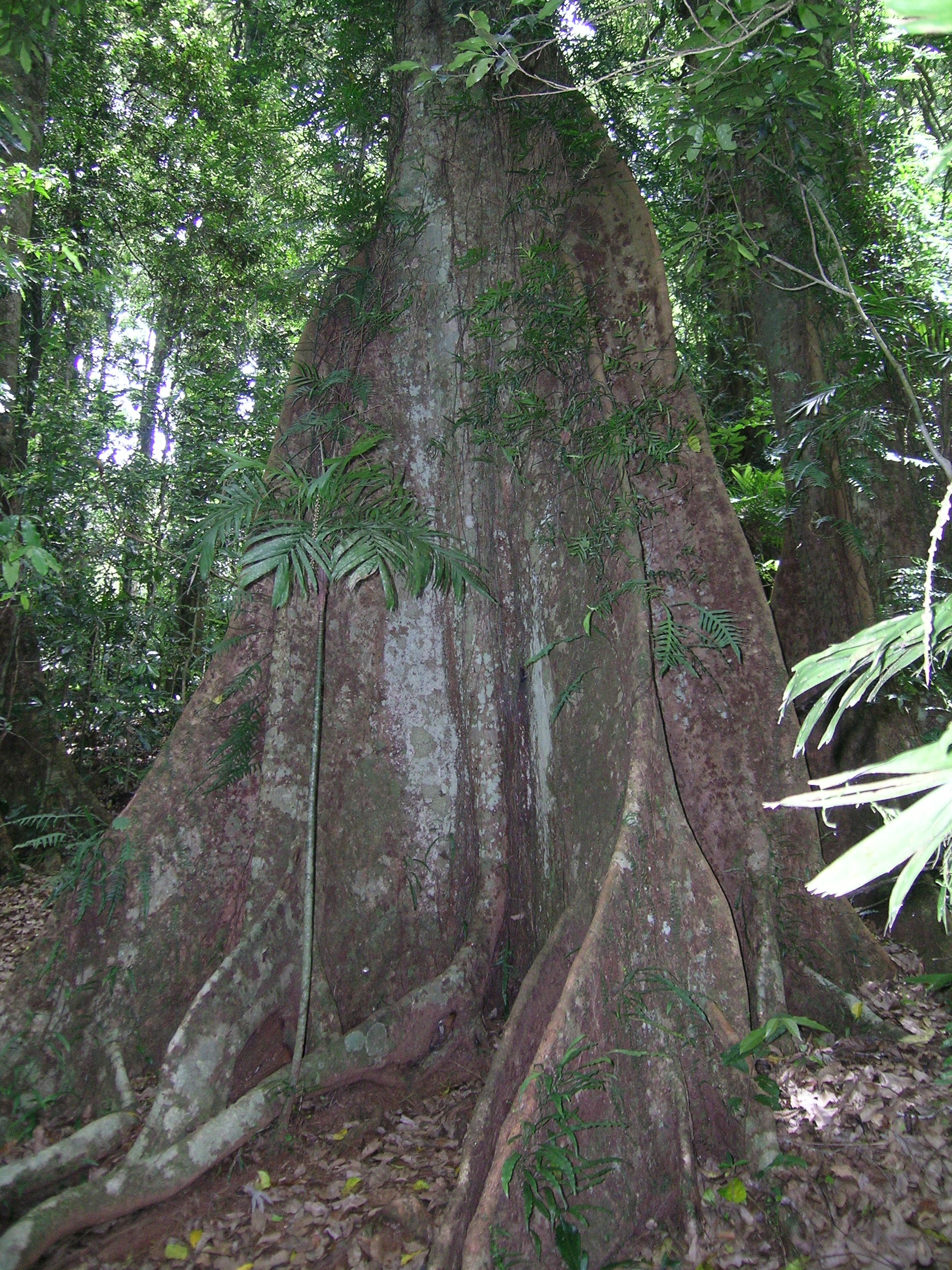
Sloanea

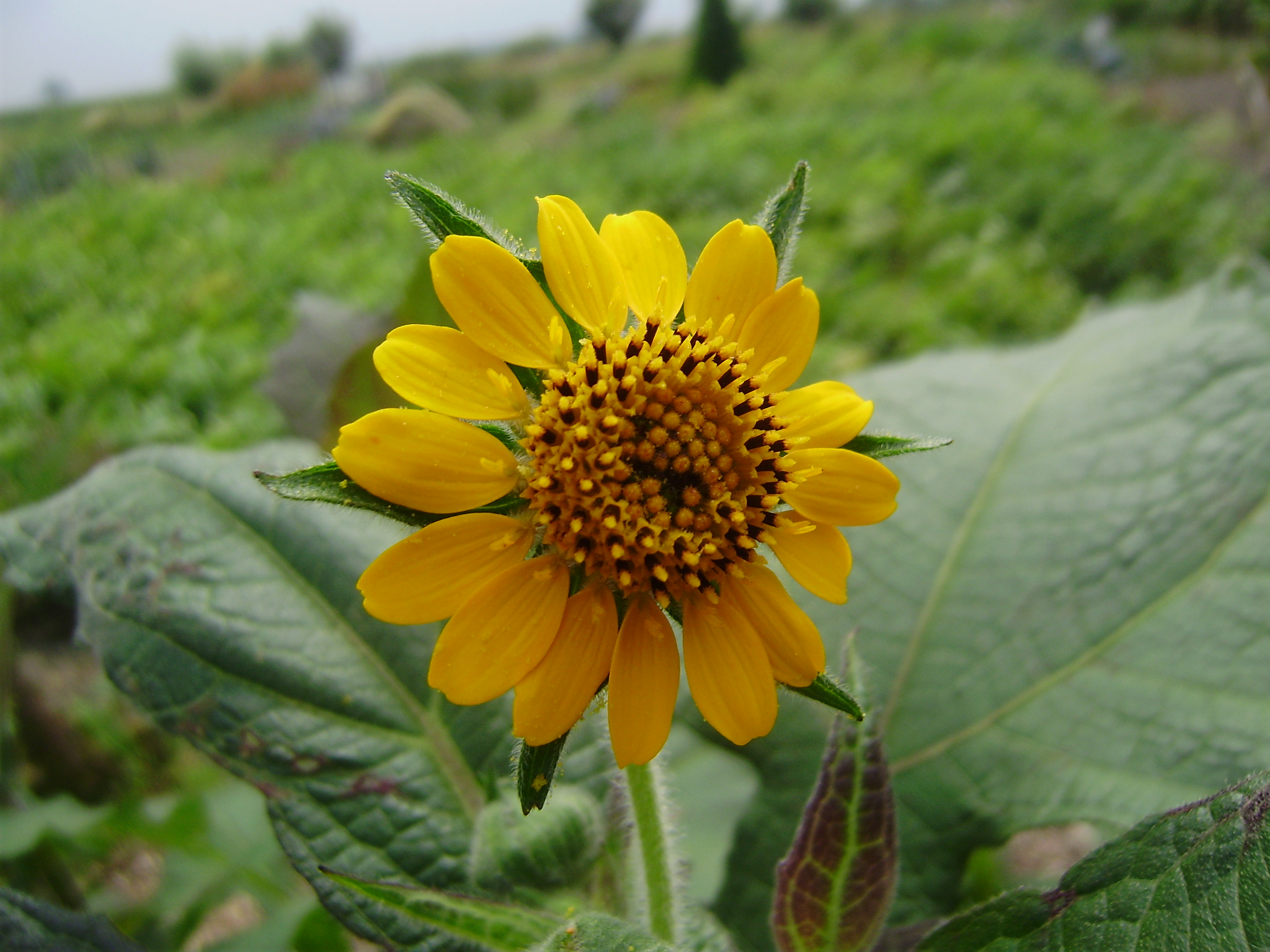
Smallanthus

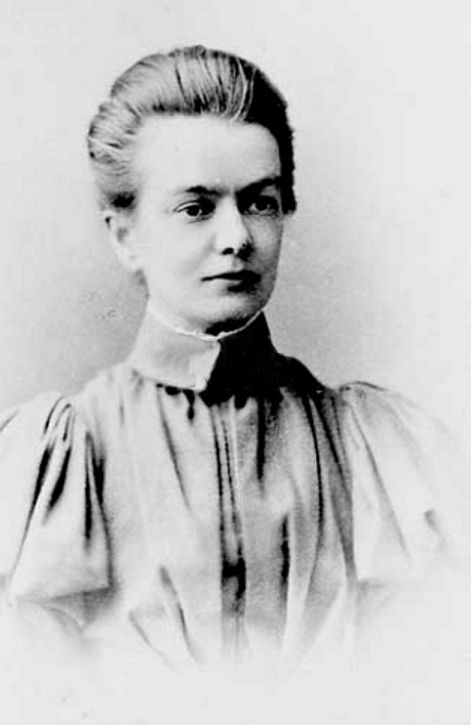
Matilda Smith

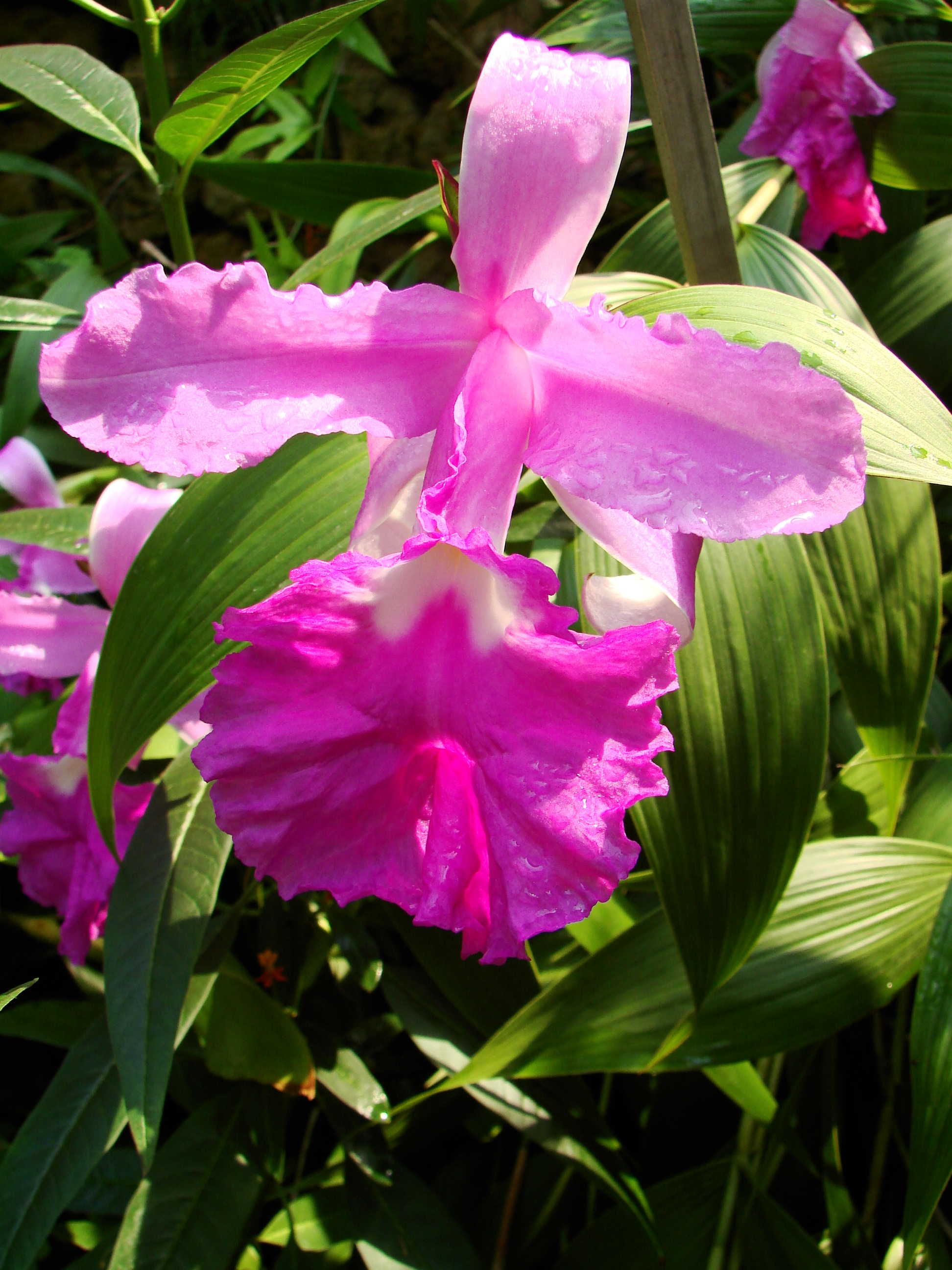
Sobralia

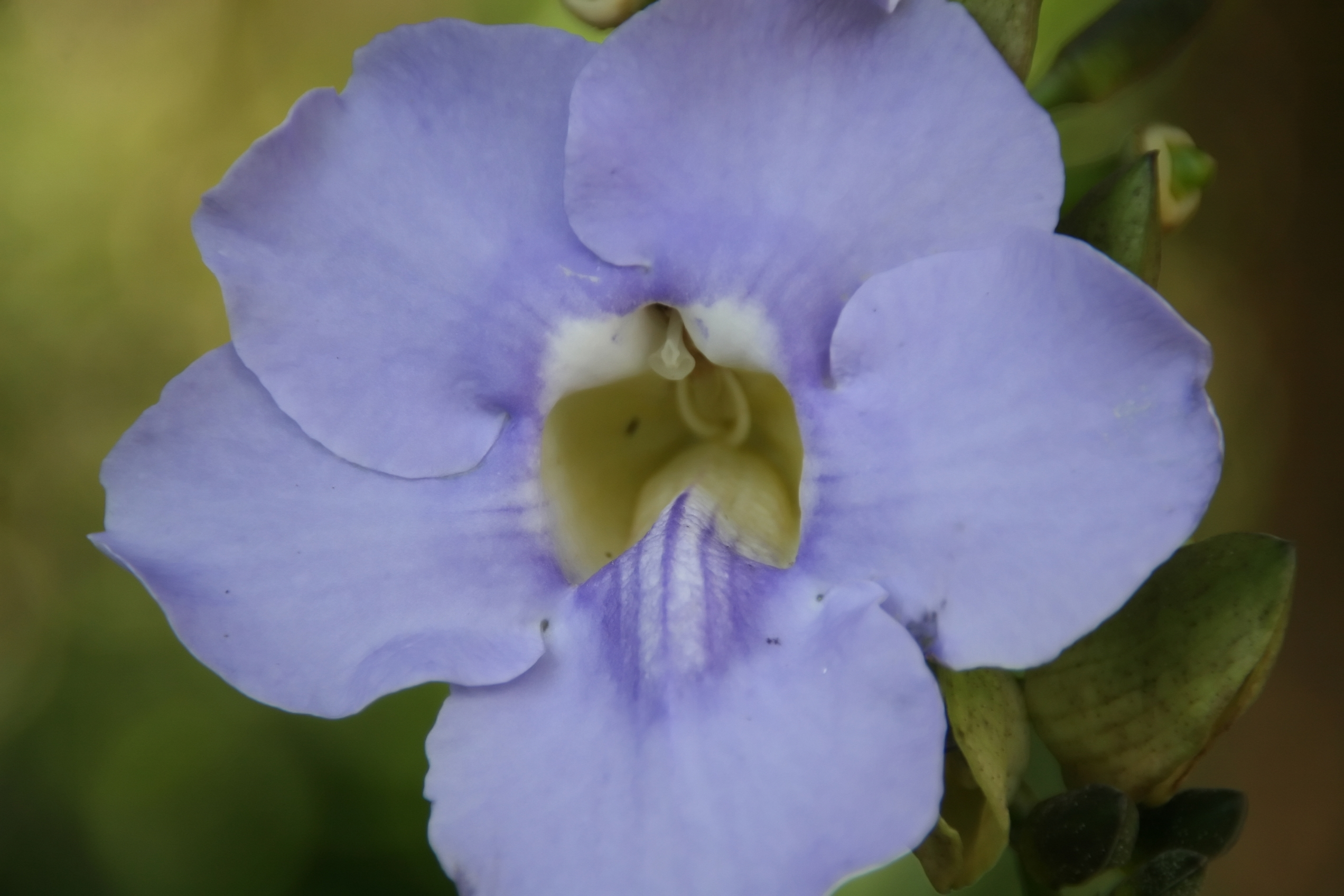
Solandra

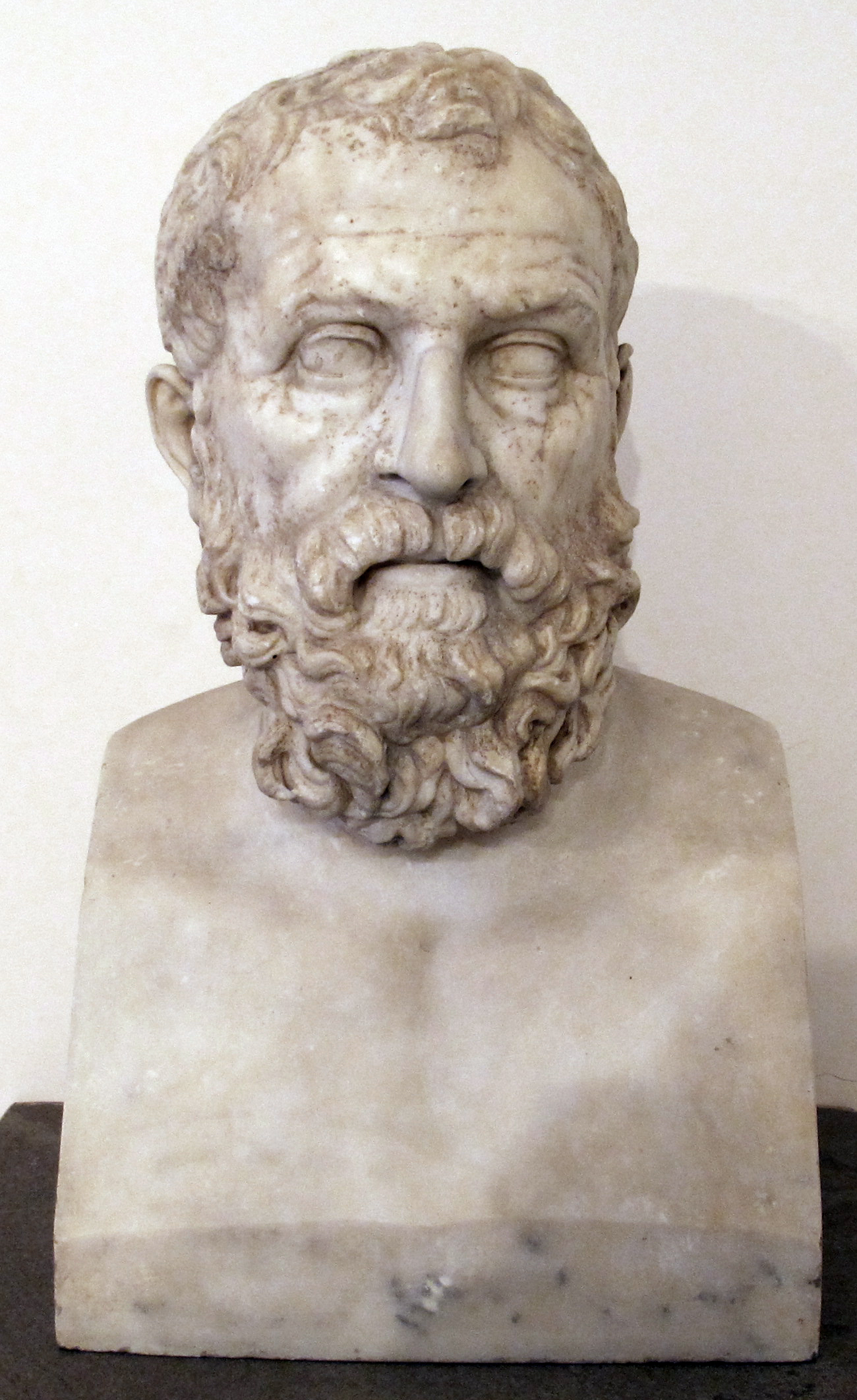
Bust of Solon

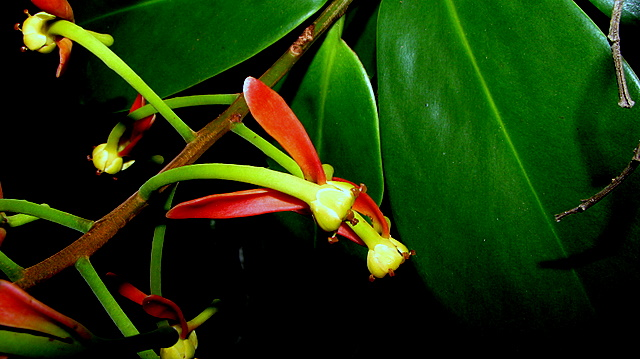
Souroubea

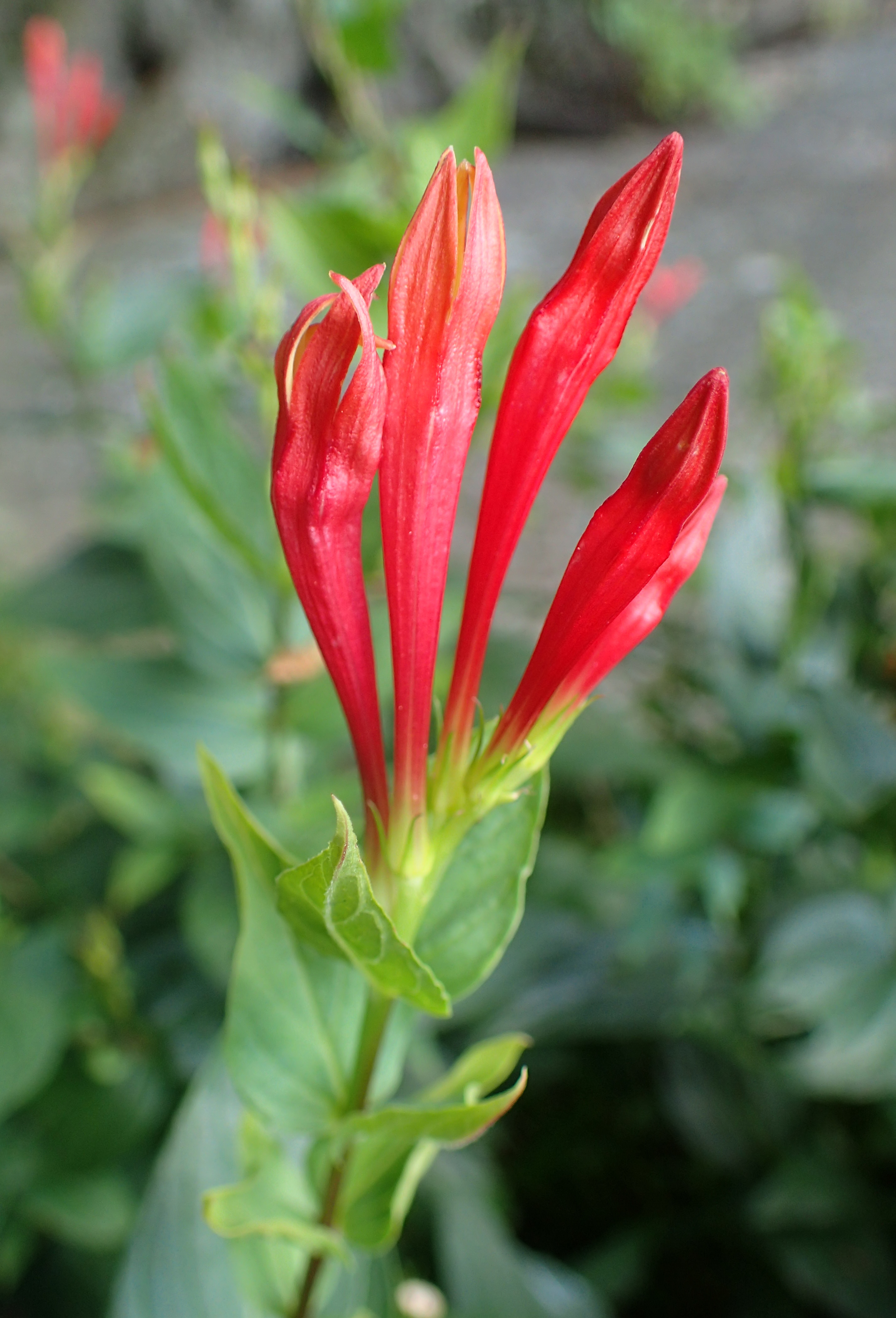
Spigelia

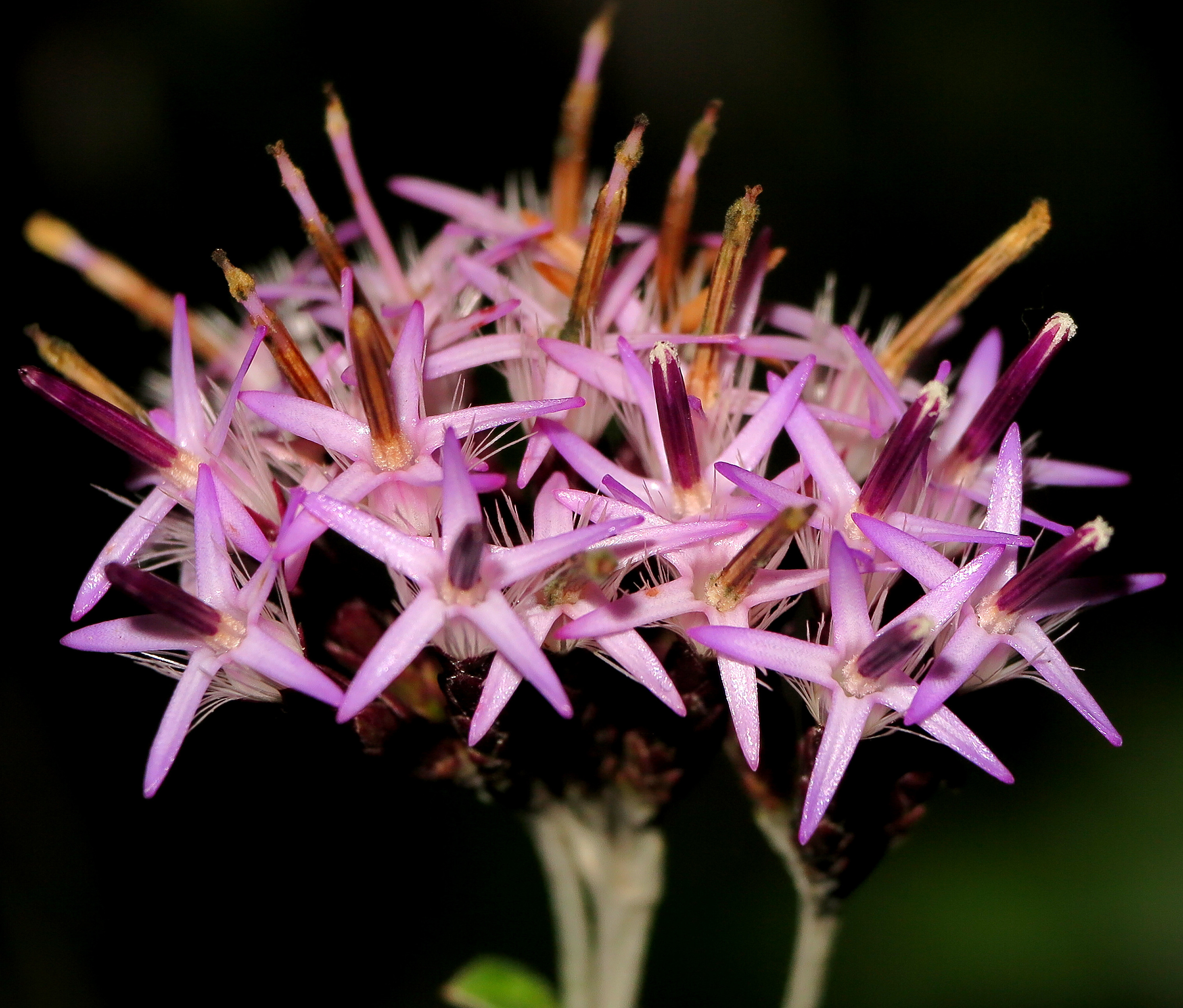
Staehelina

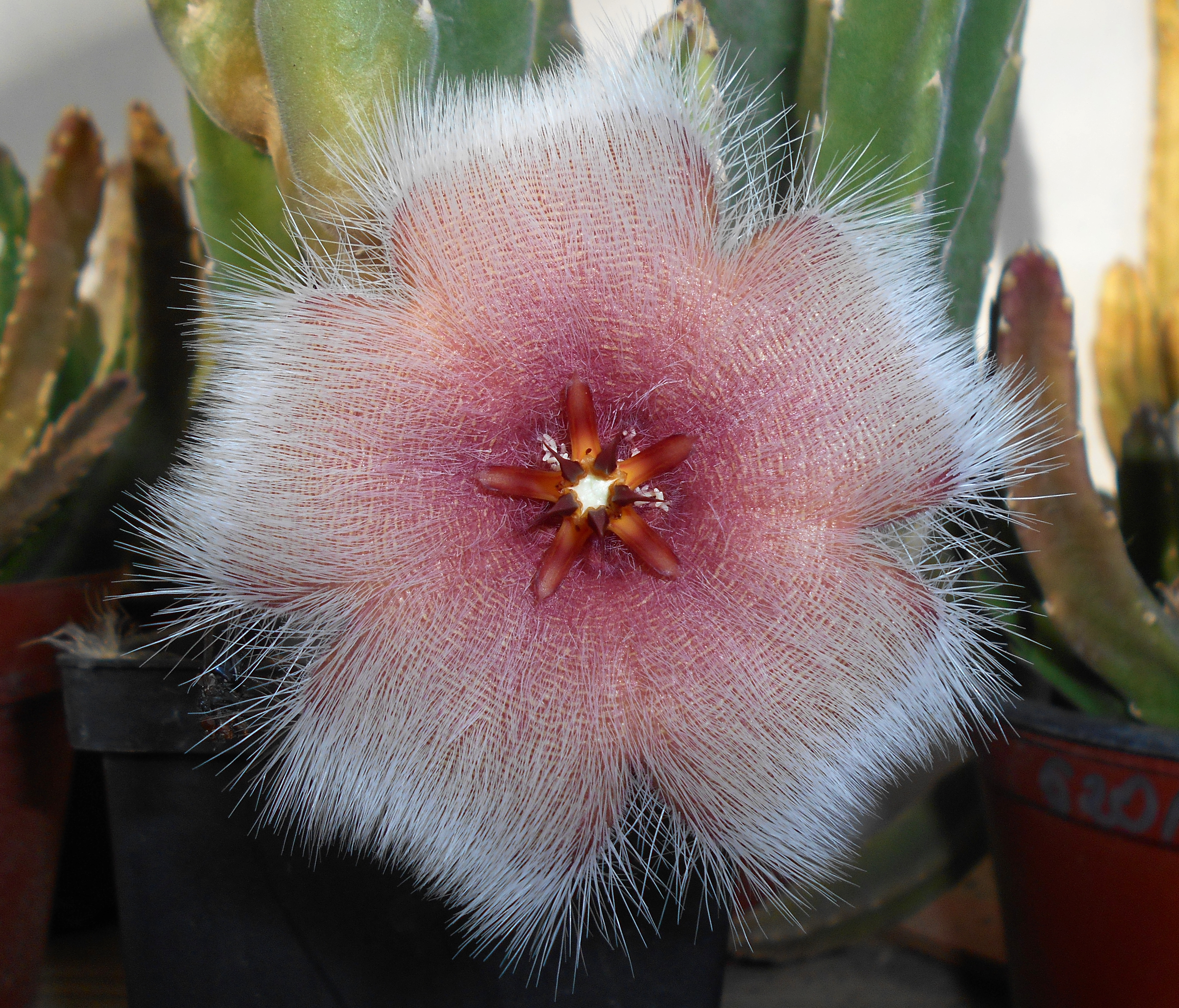
Stapelia

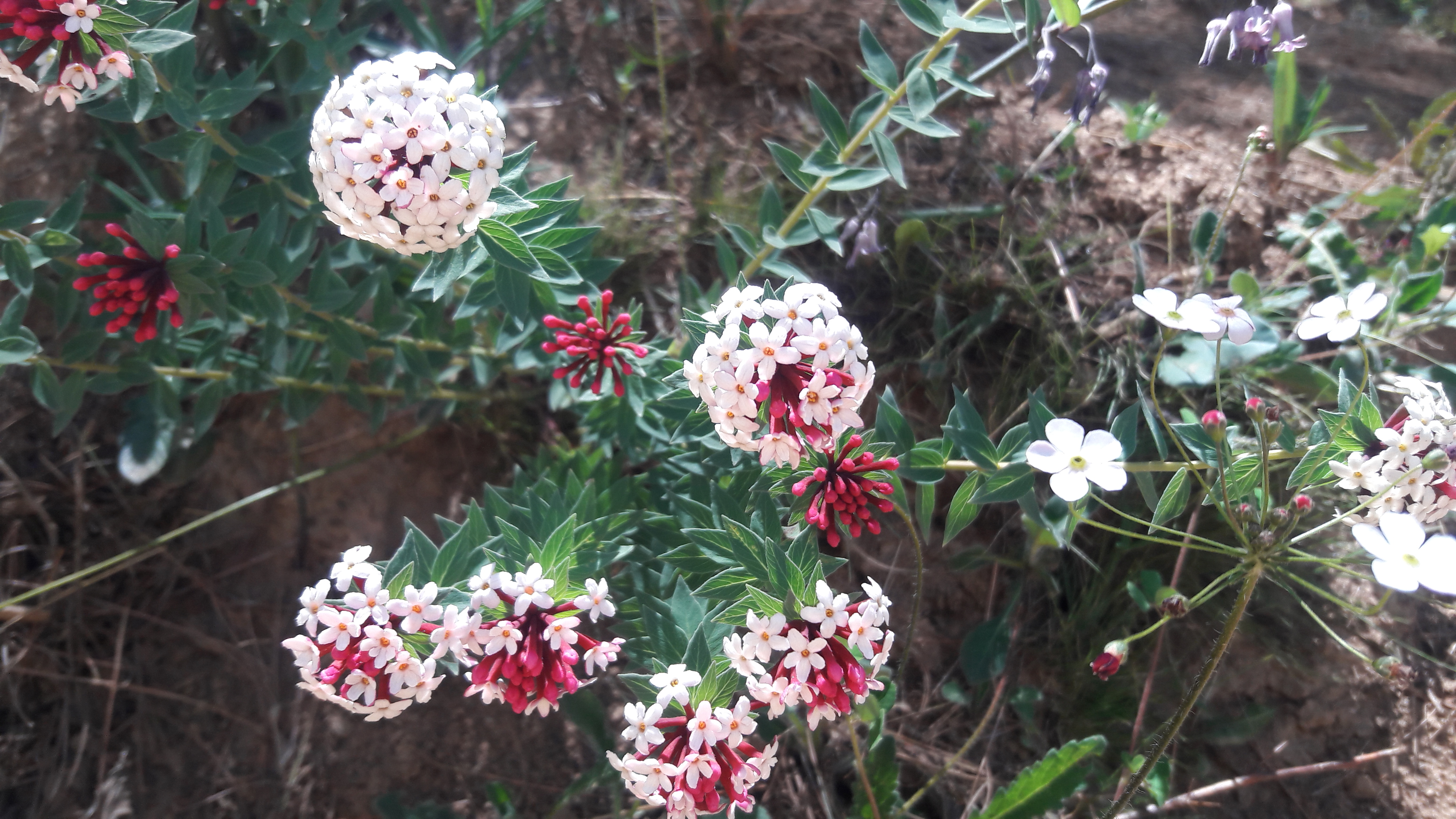
Stellera

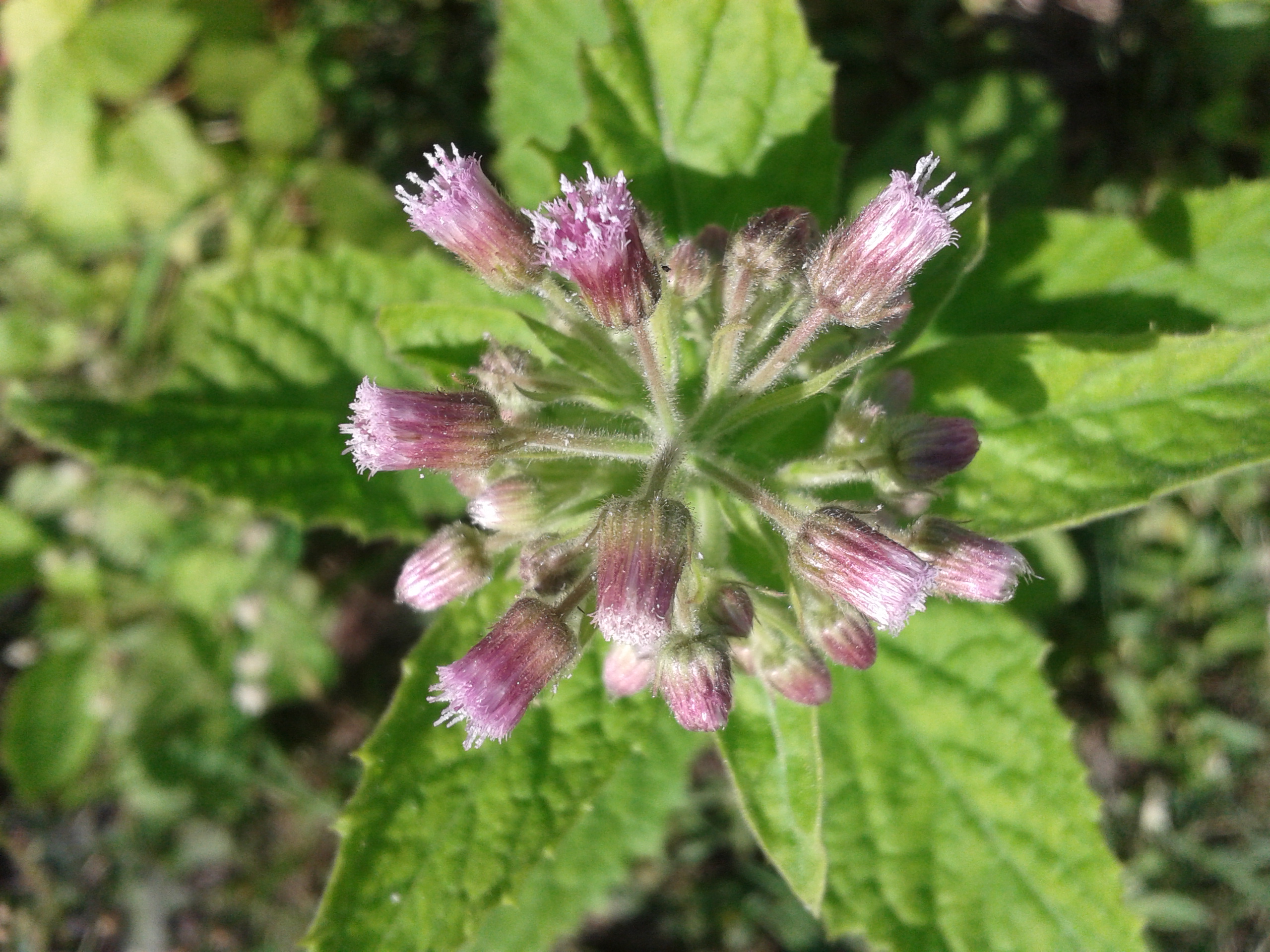
Stevia

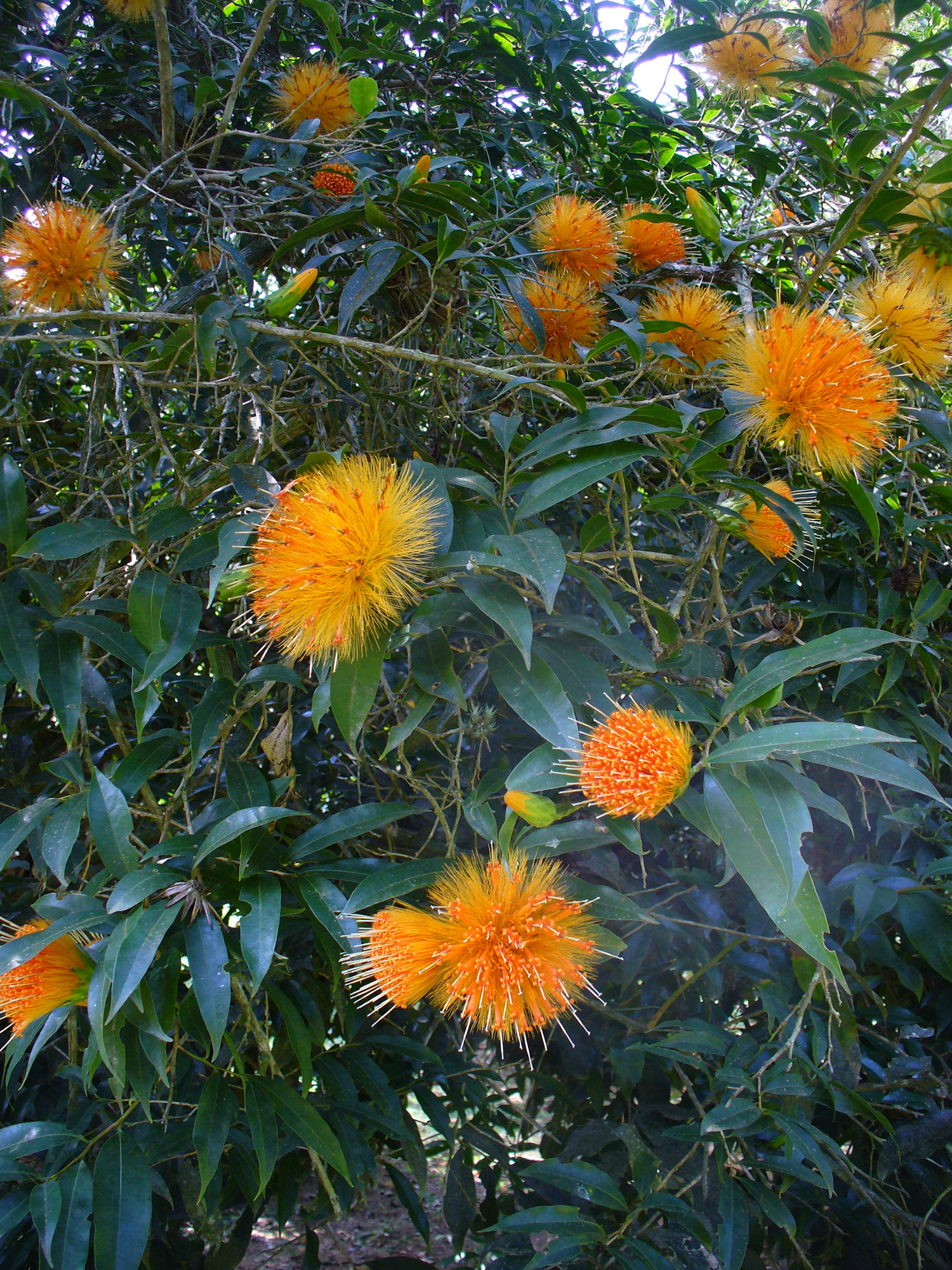
Stifftia

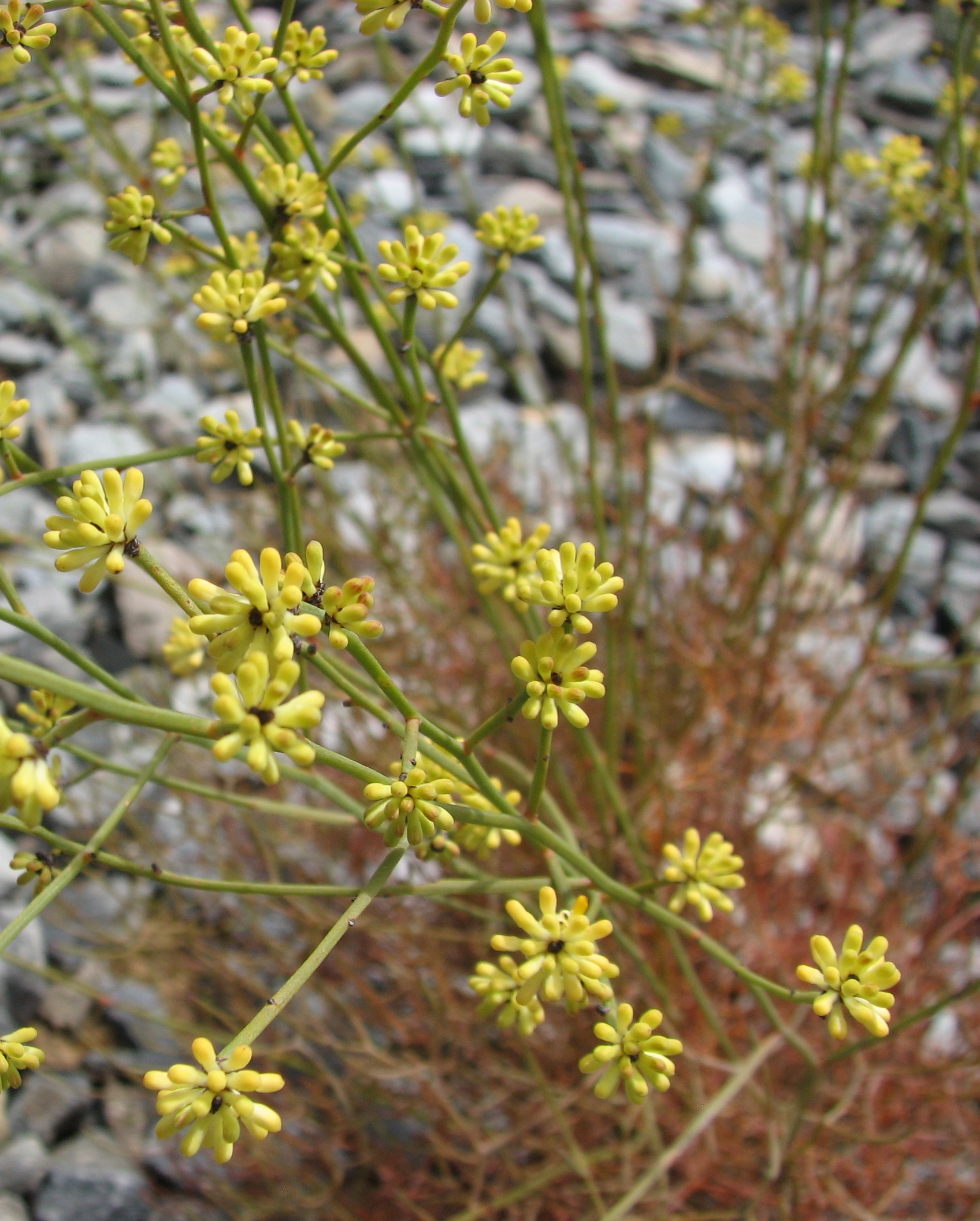
Stirlingia

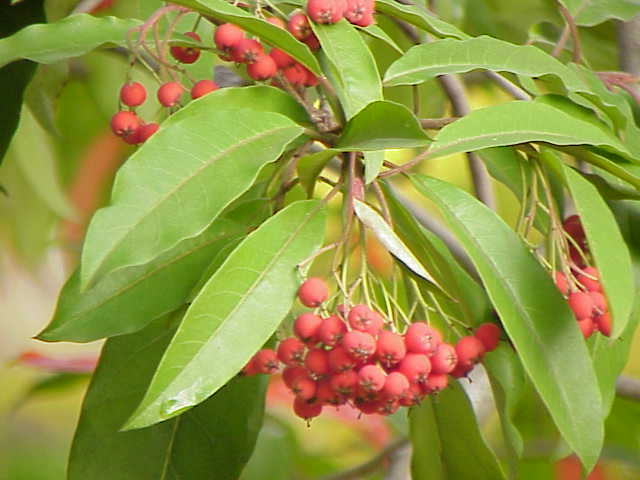
Stranvaesia

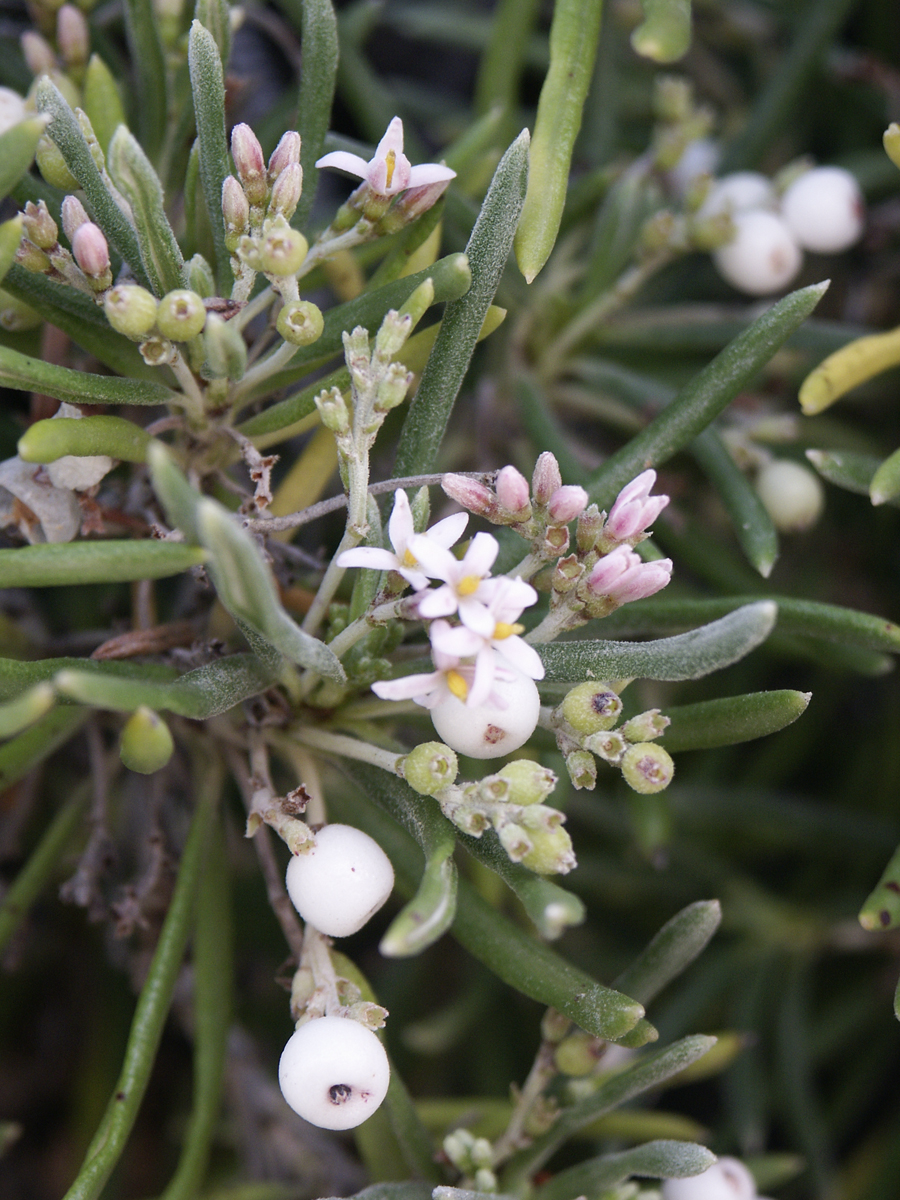
Strumpfia

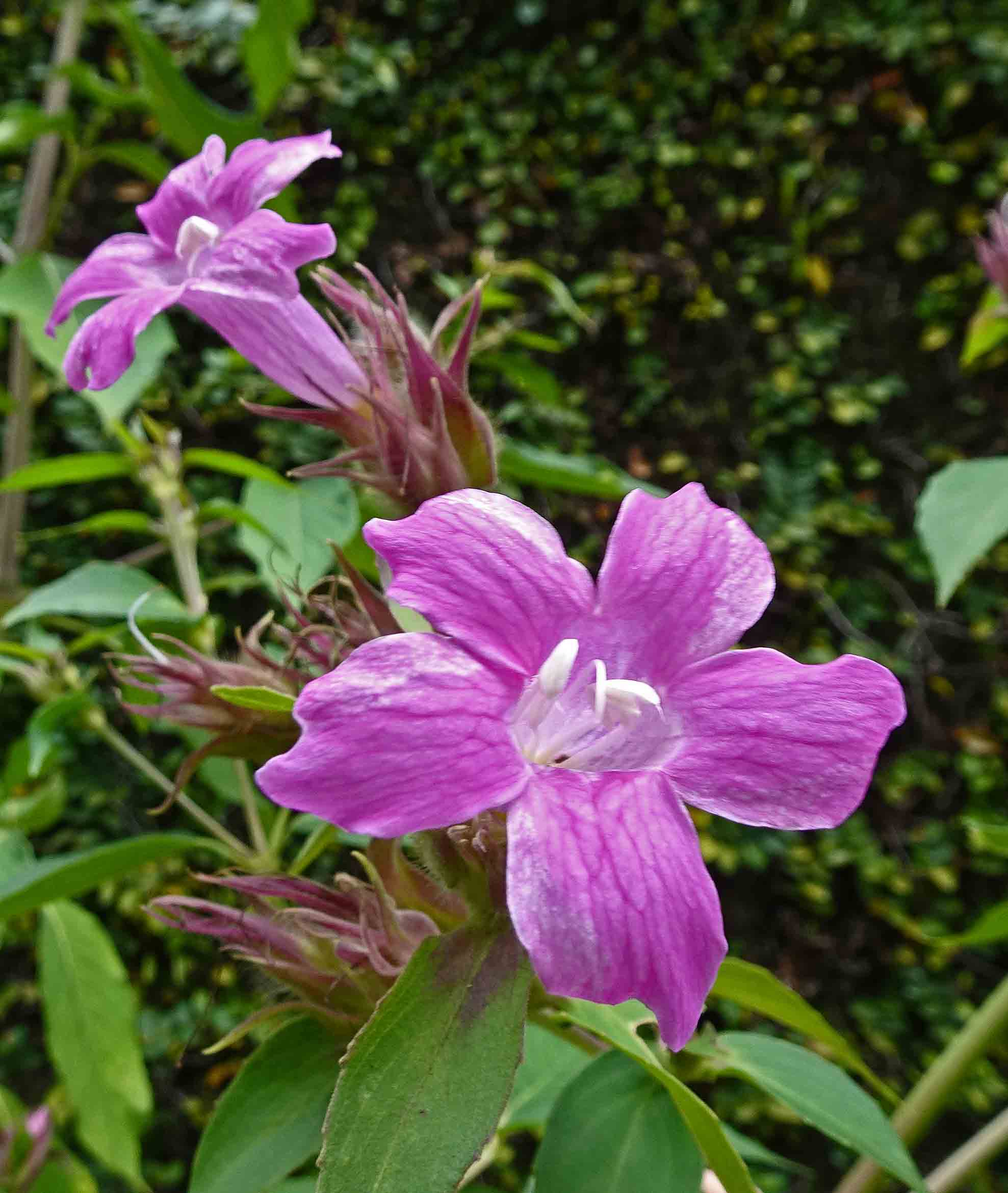
Suessenguthia

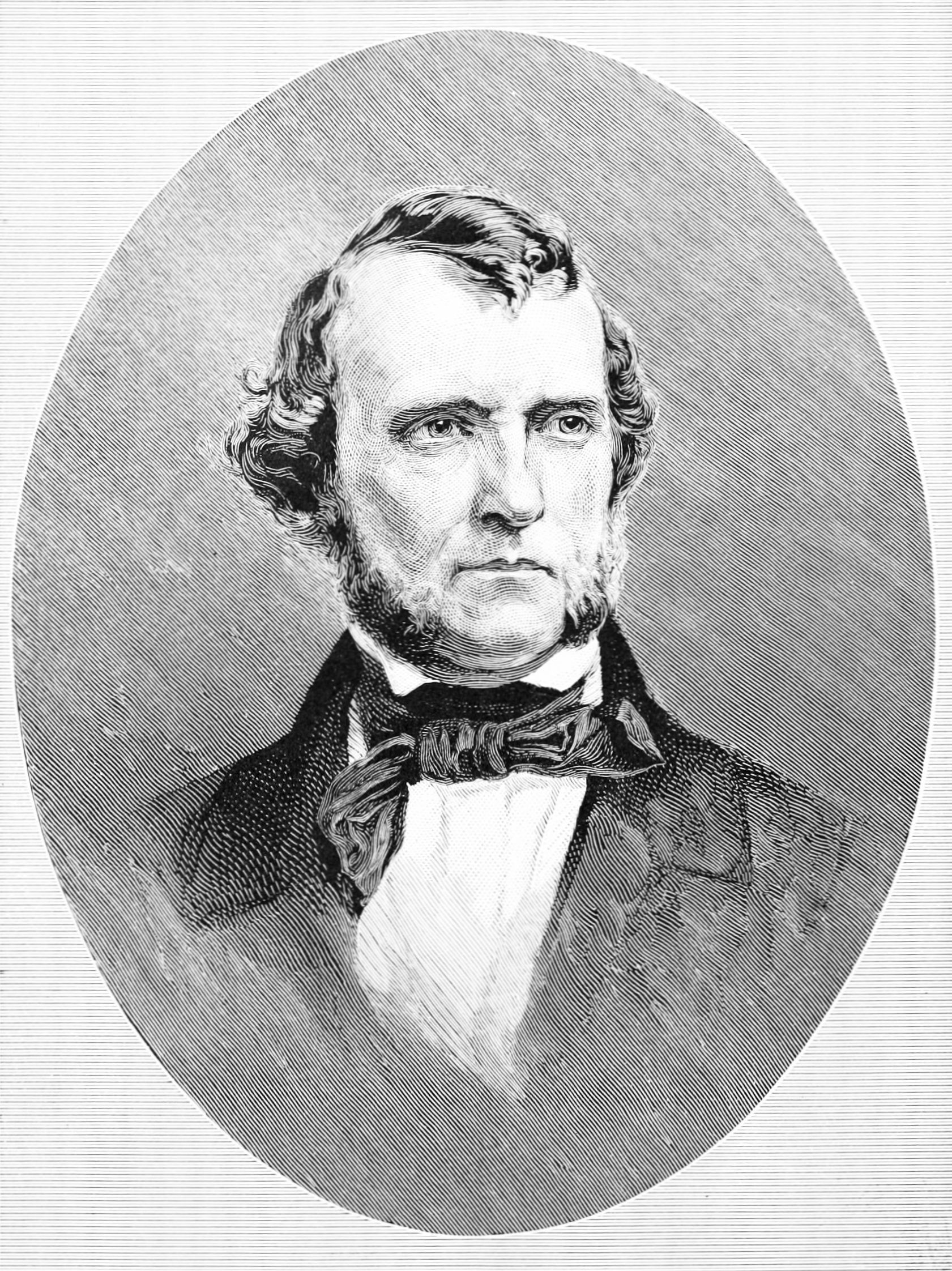
William Starling Sullivant

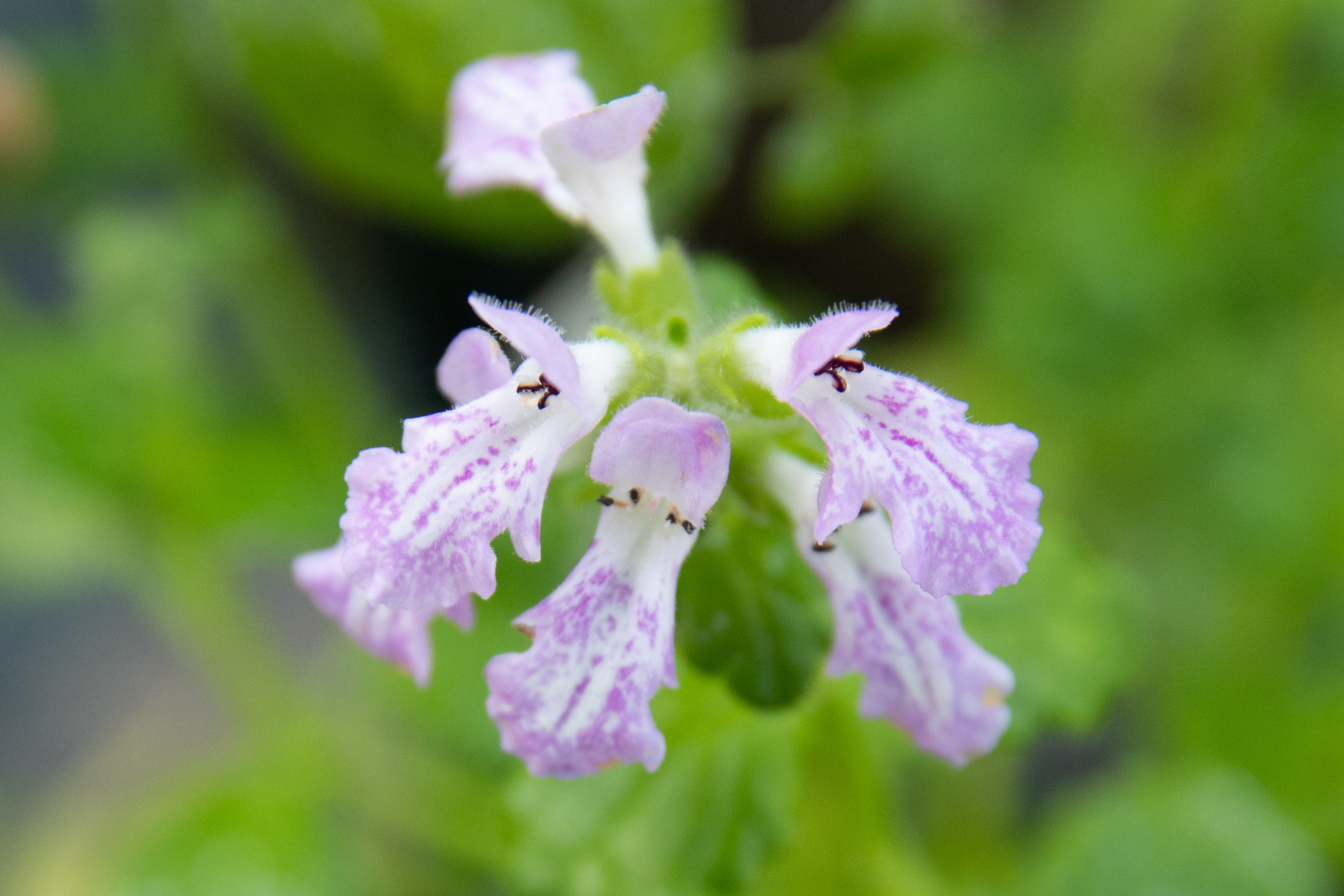
Suzukia

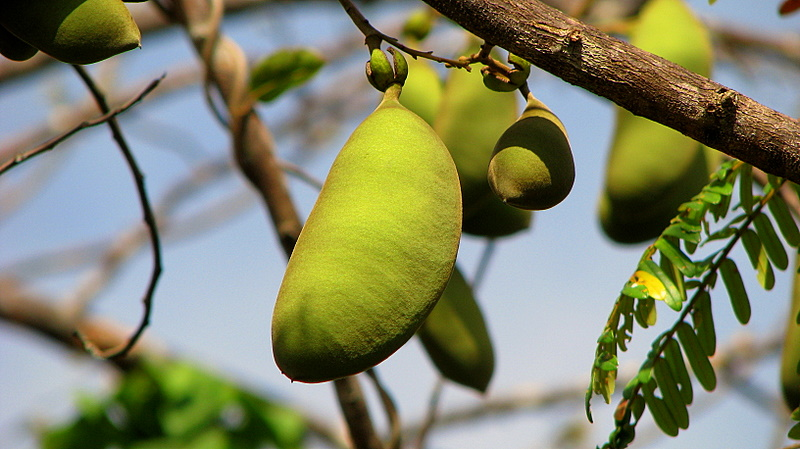
Swartzia

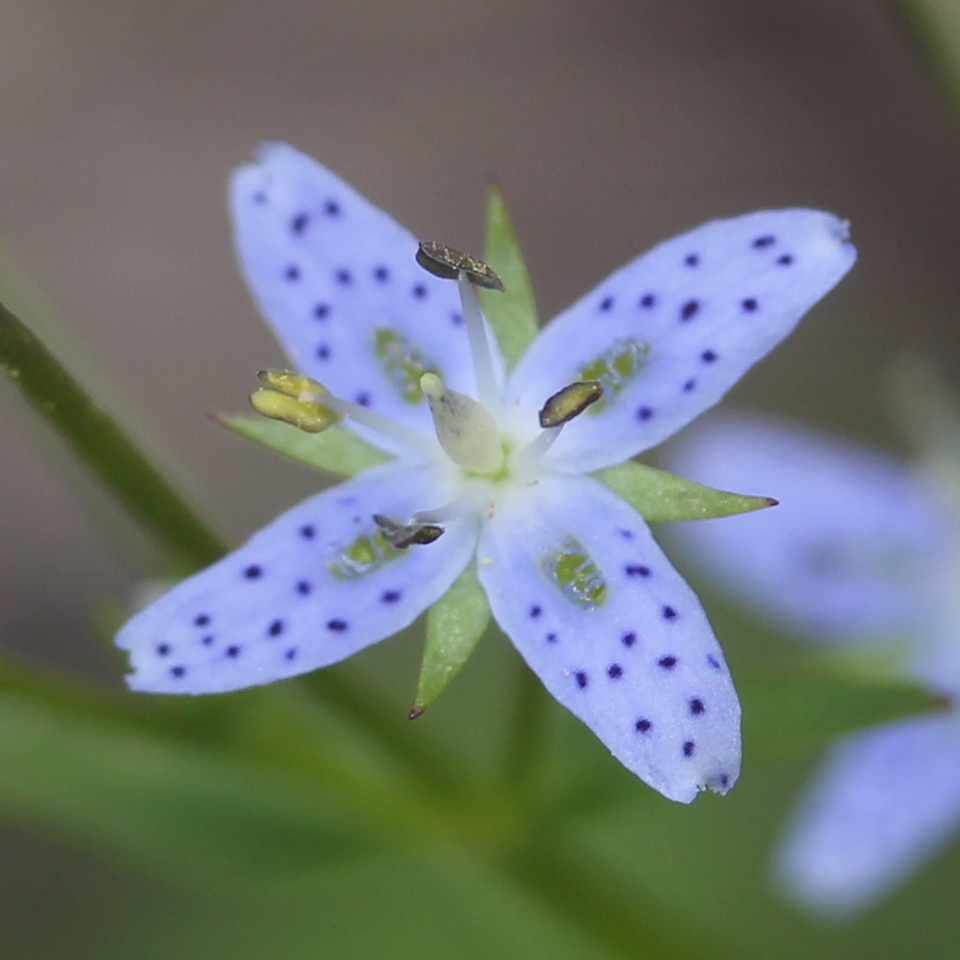
Swertia

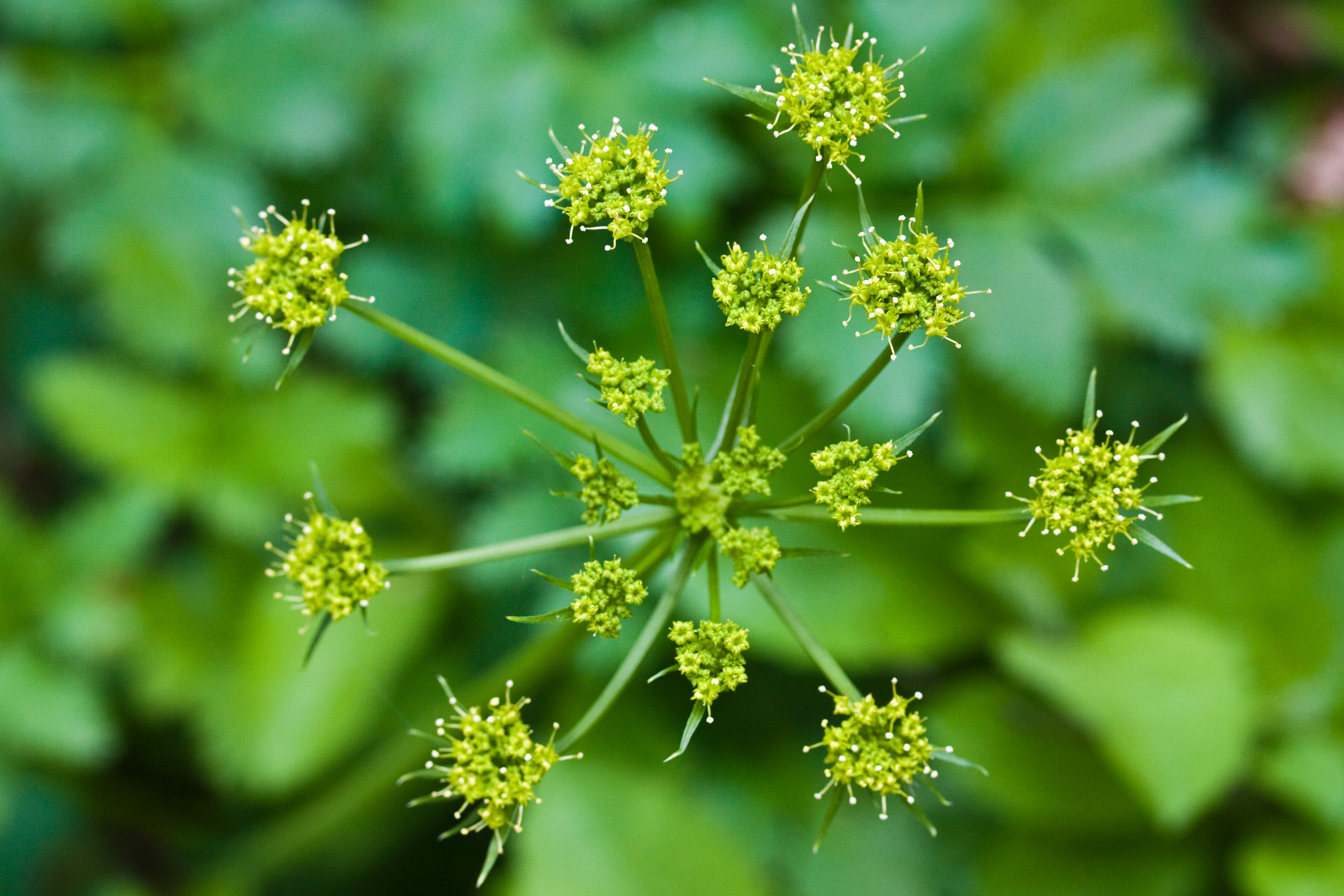
Tauschia

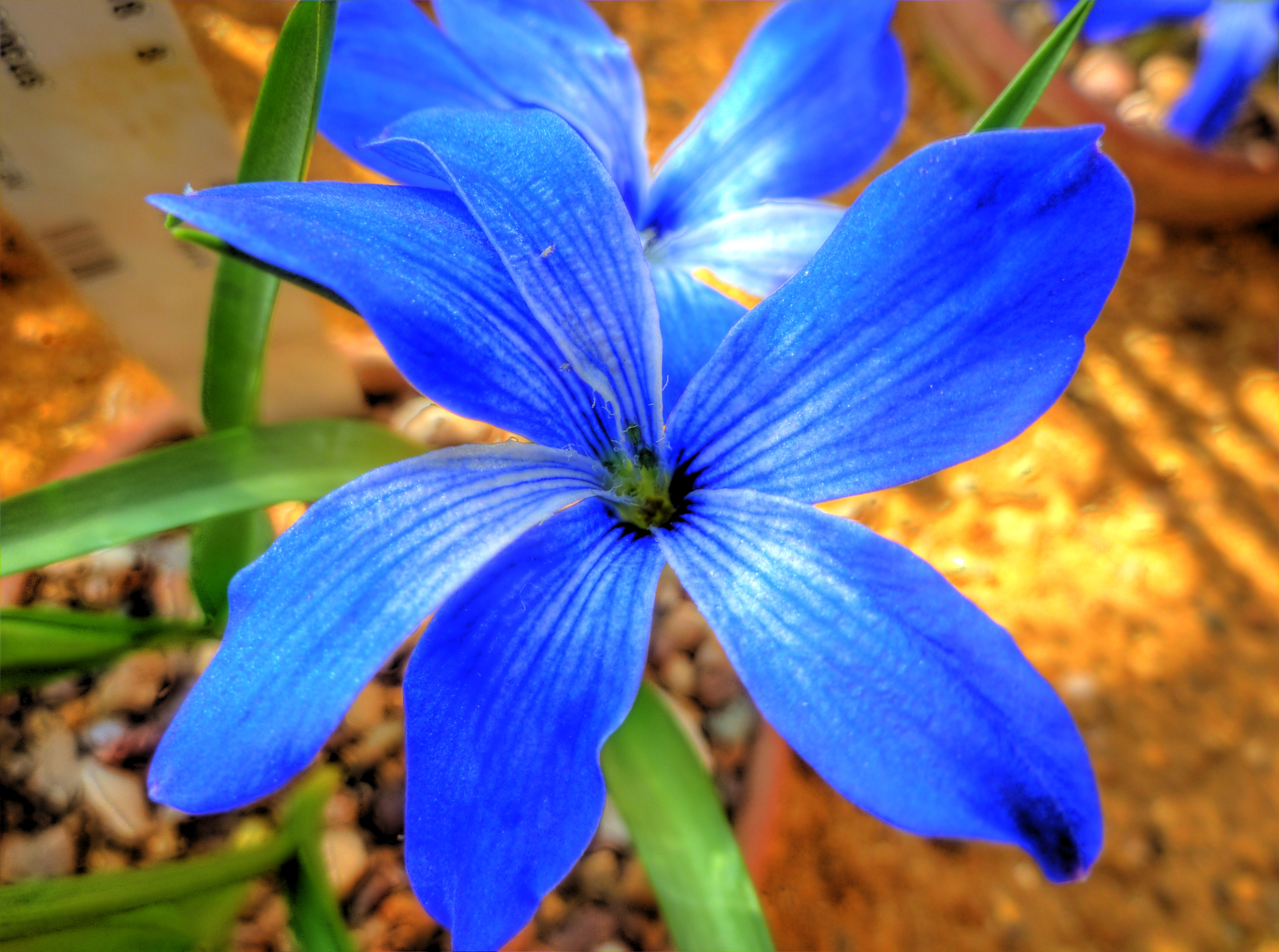
Tecophilaea

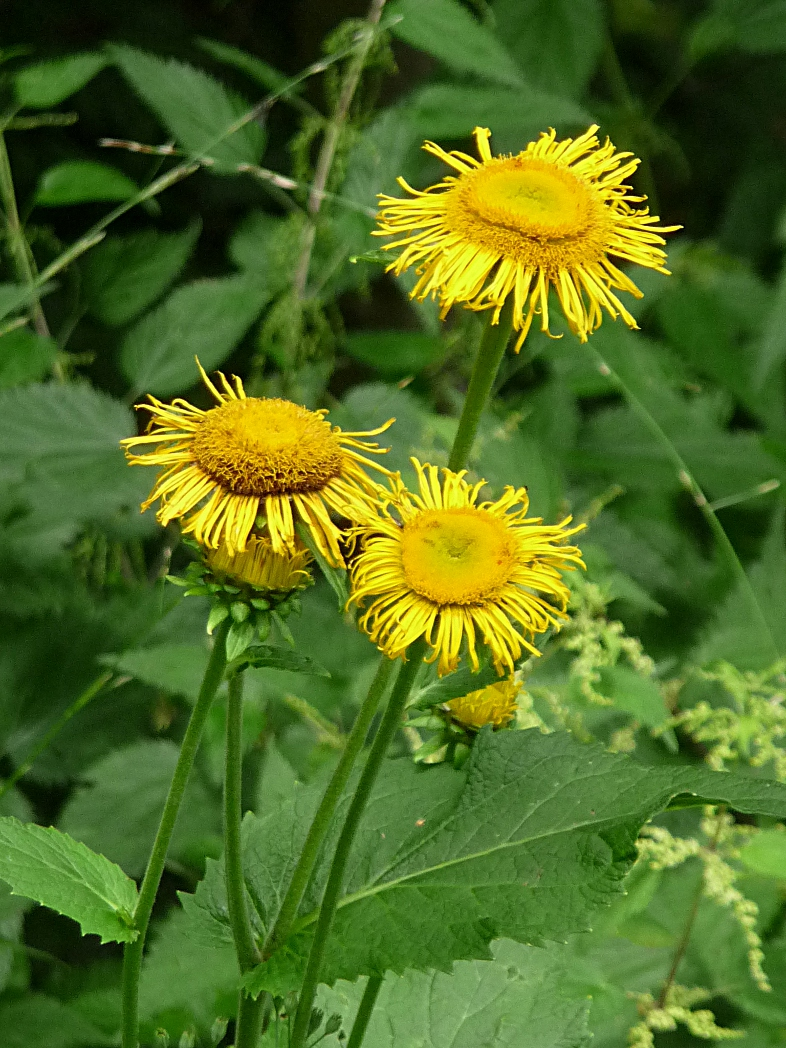
Telekia

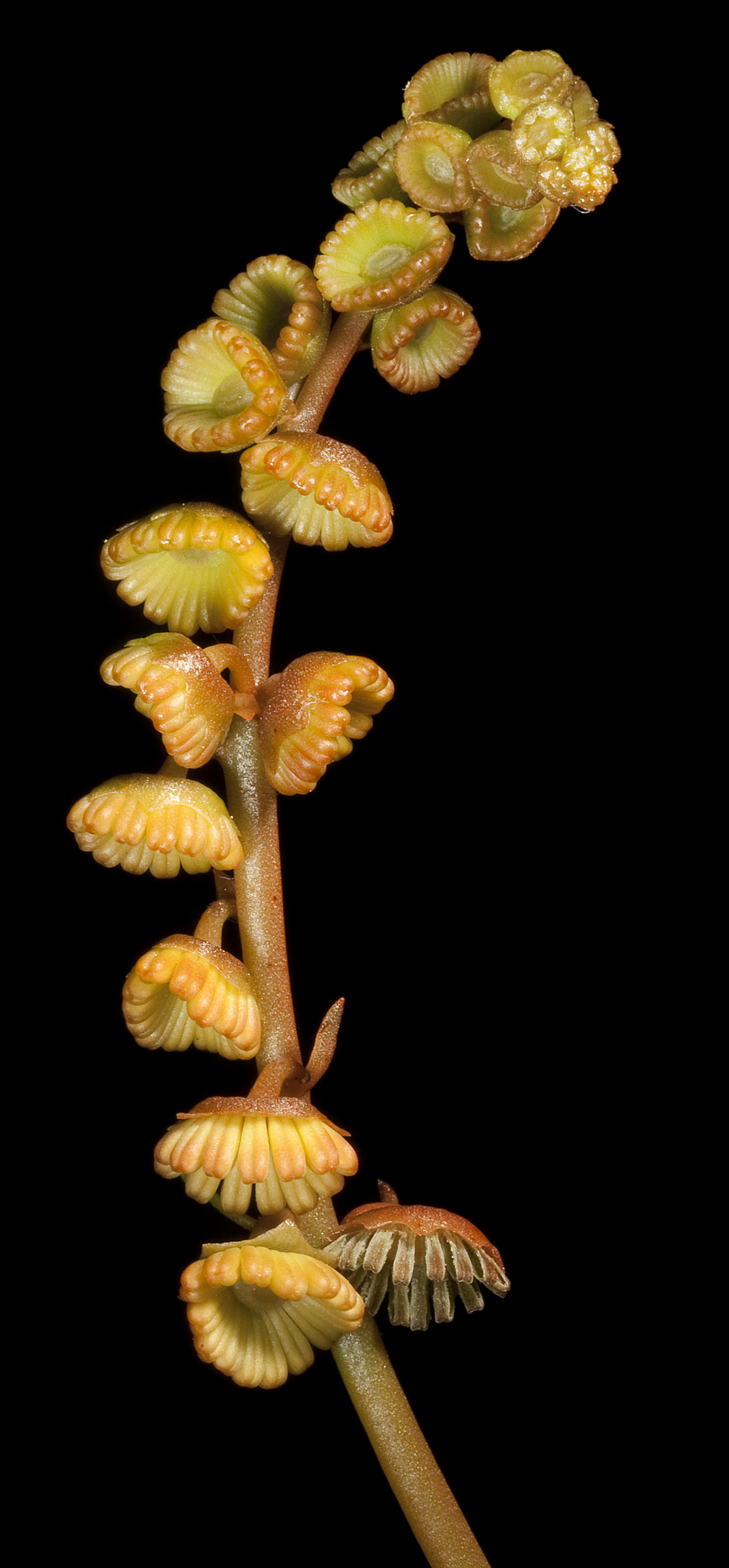
Tersonia

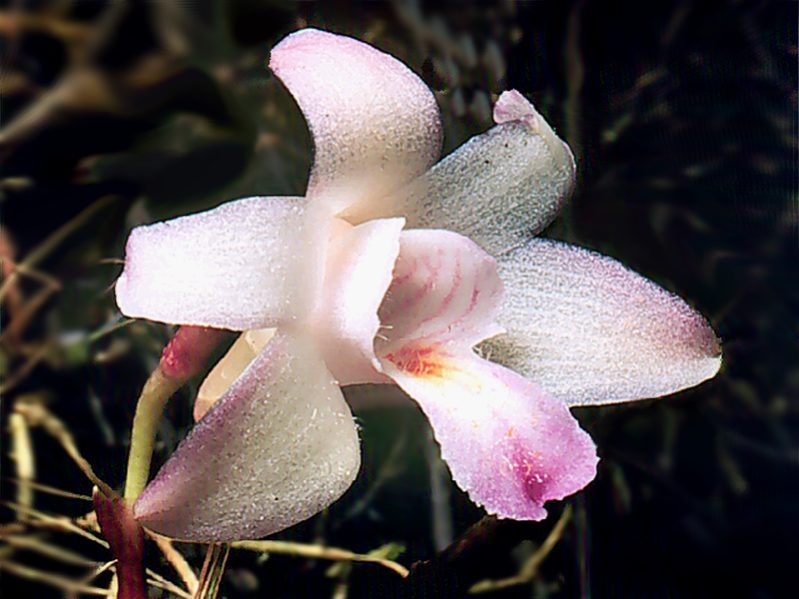
Teuscheria

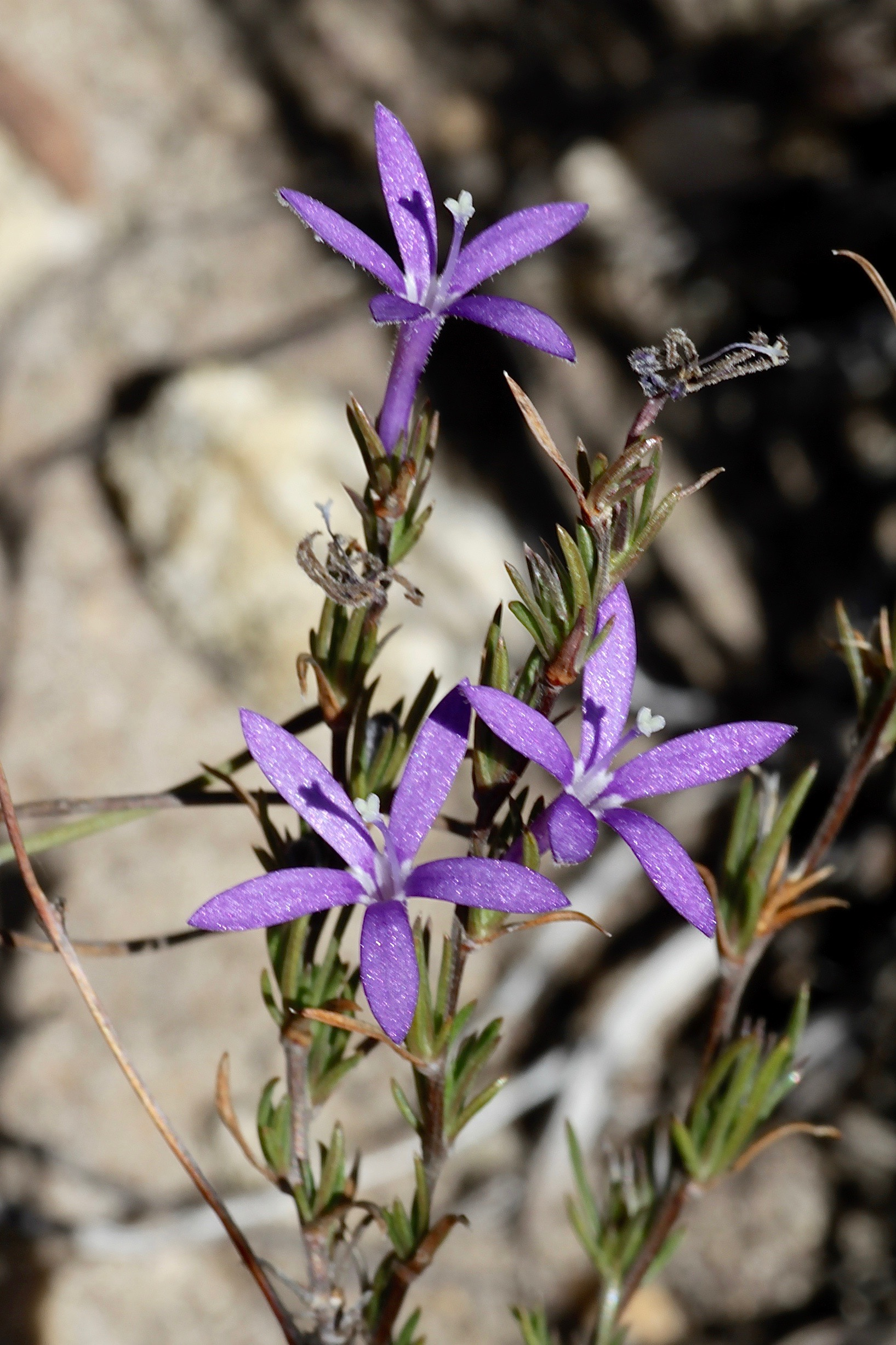
Theilera

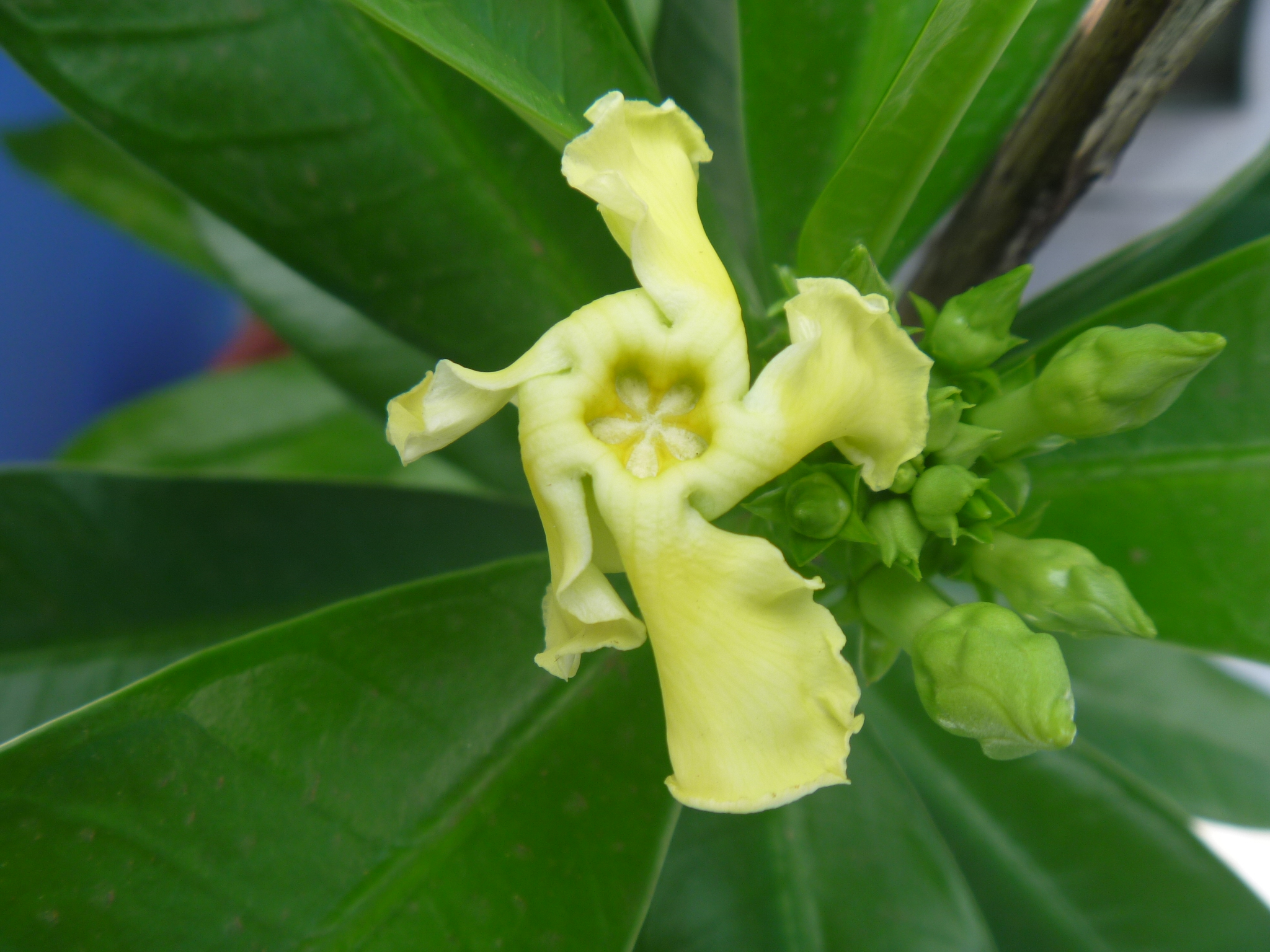
Thevetia

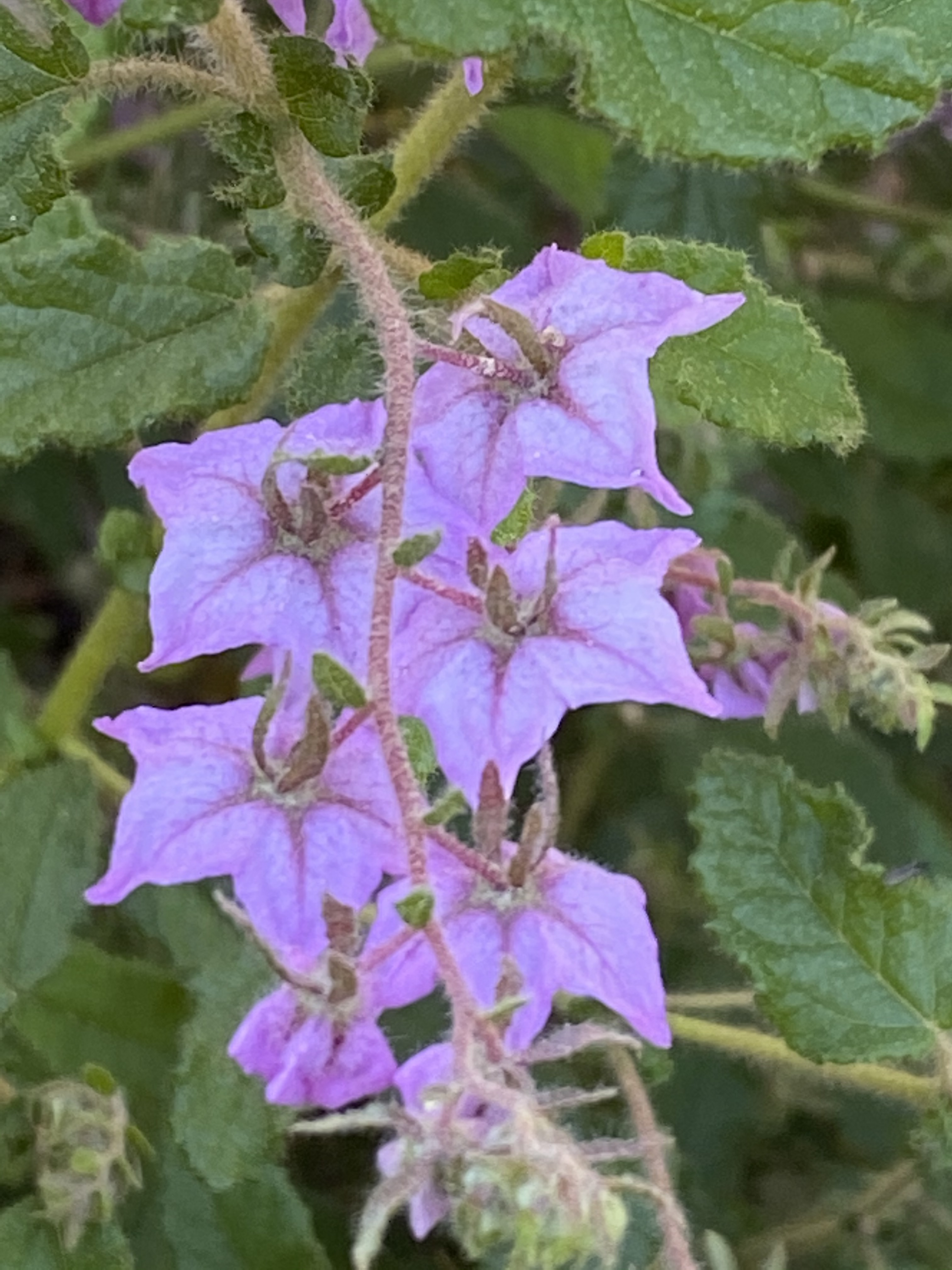
Thomasia

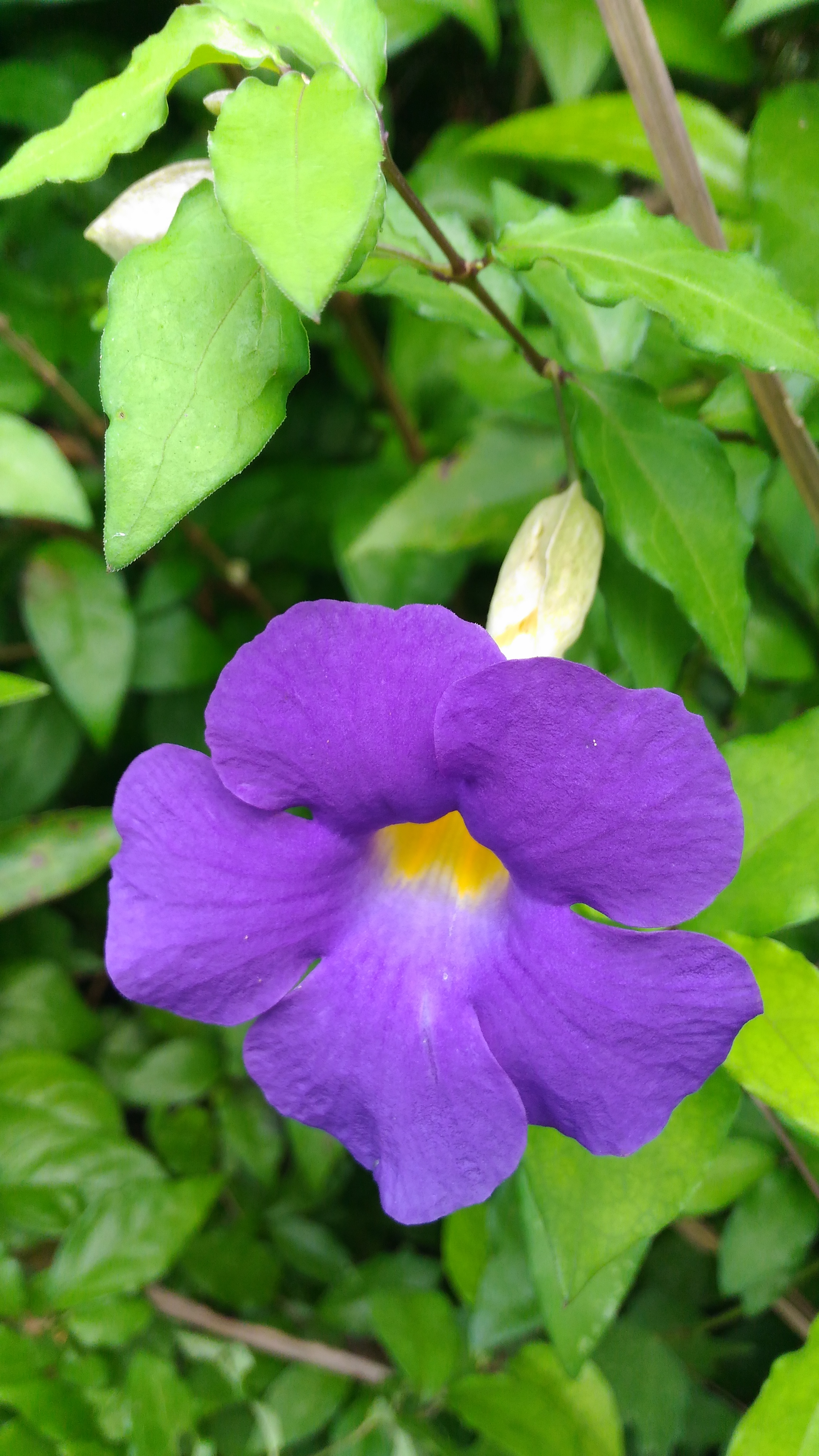
Thunbergia

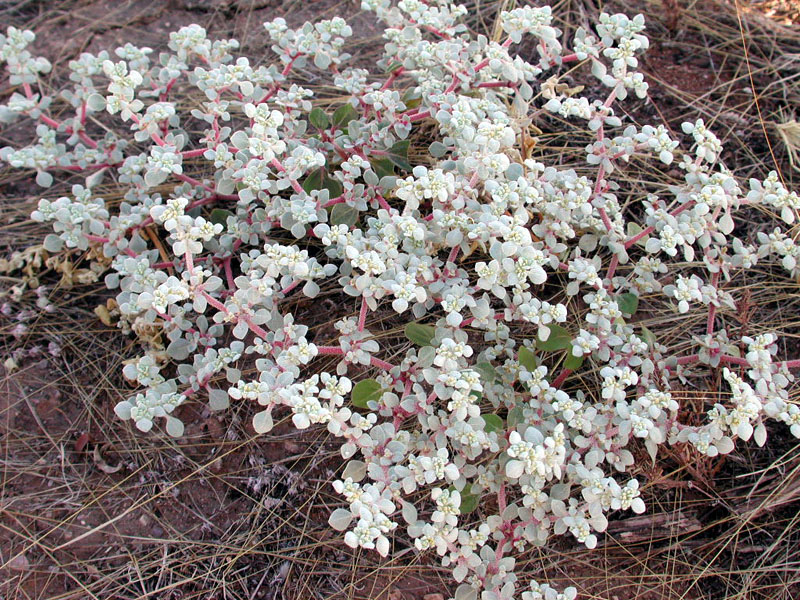
Tidestromia

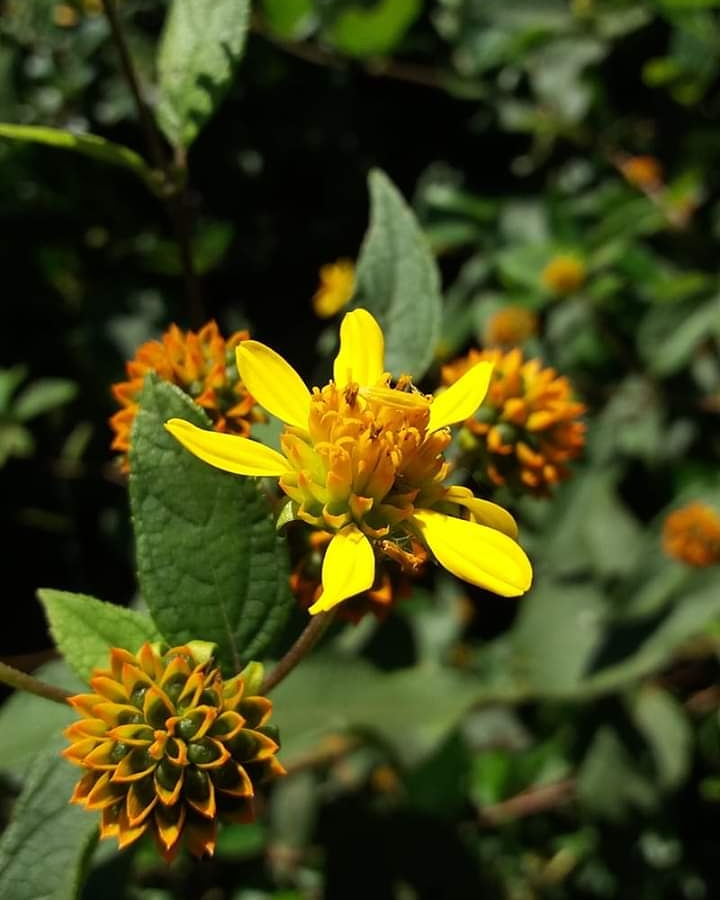
Tilesia

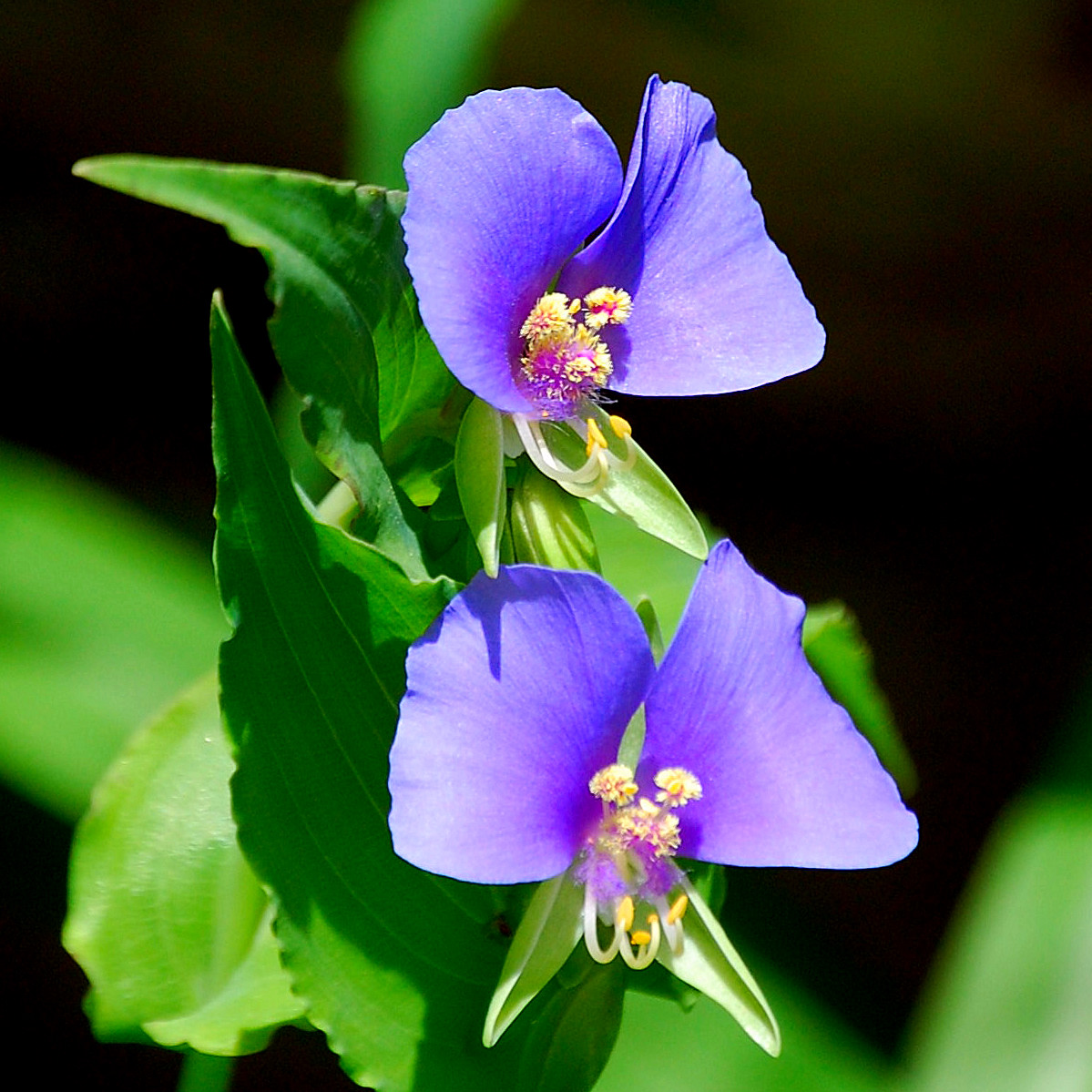
Tinantia

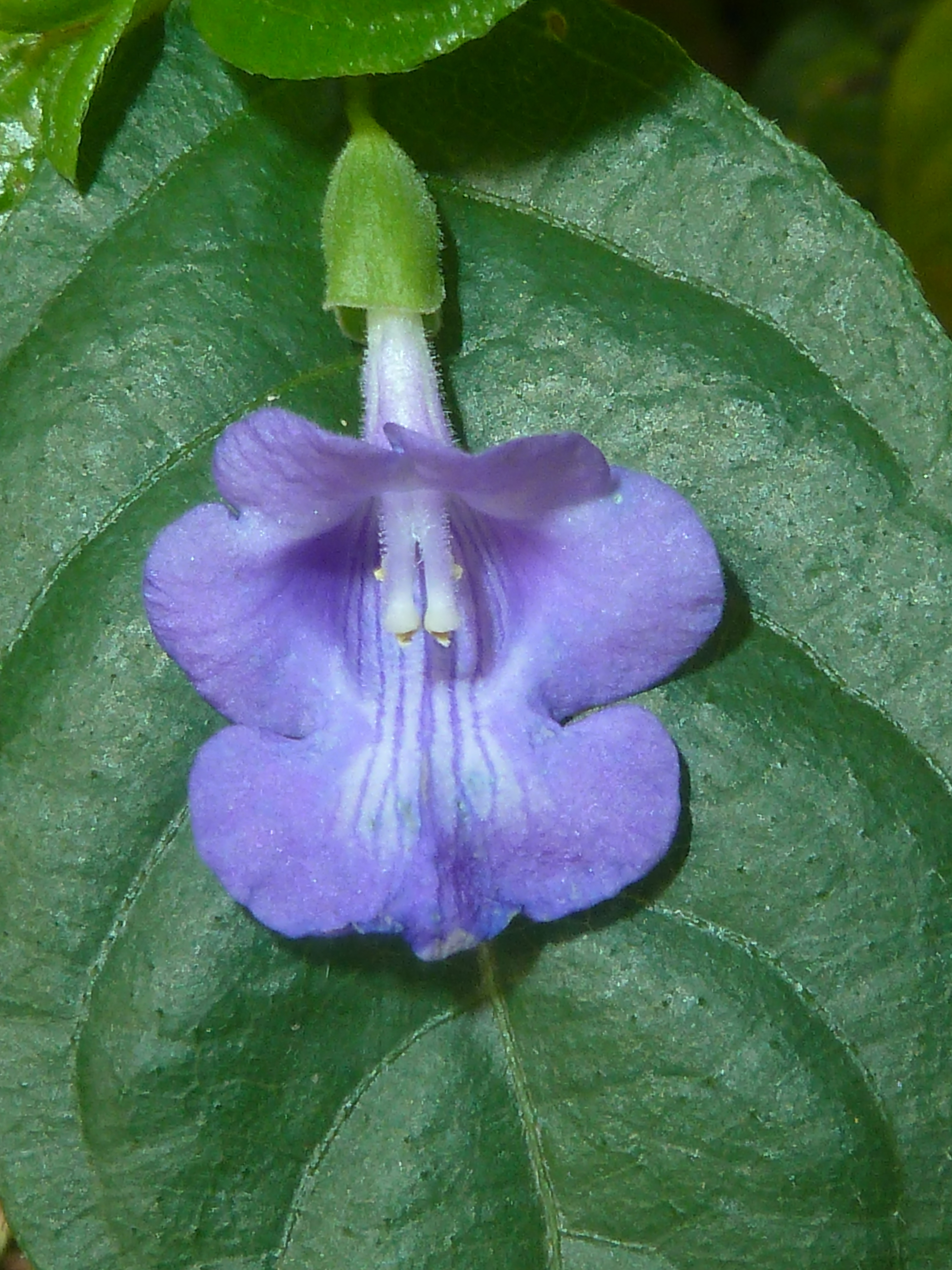
Tinnea

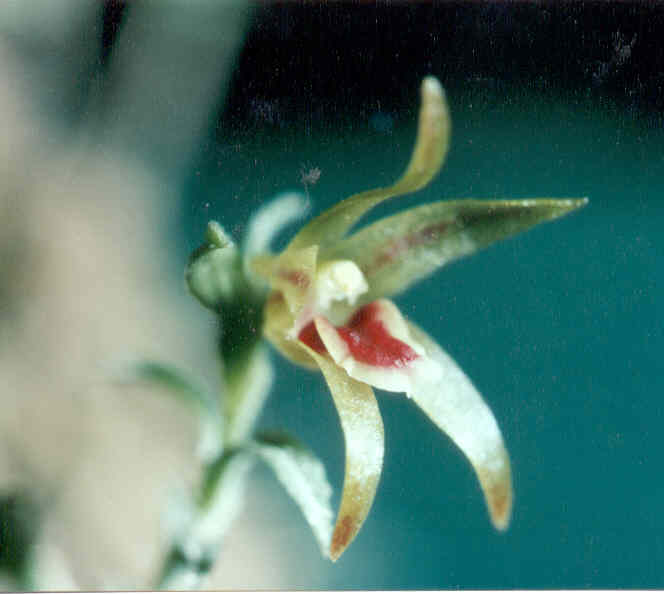
Tomzanonia

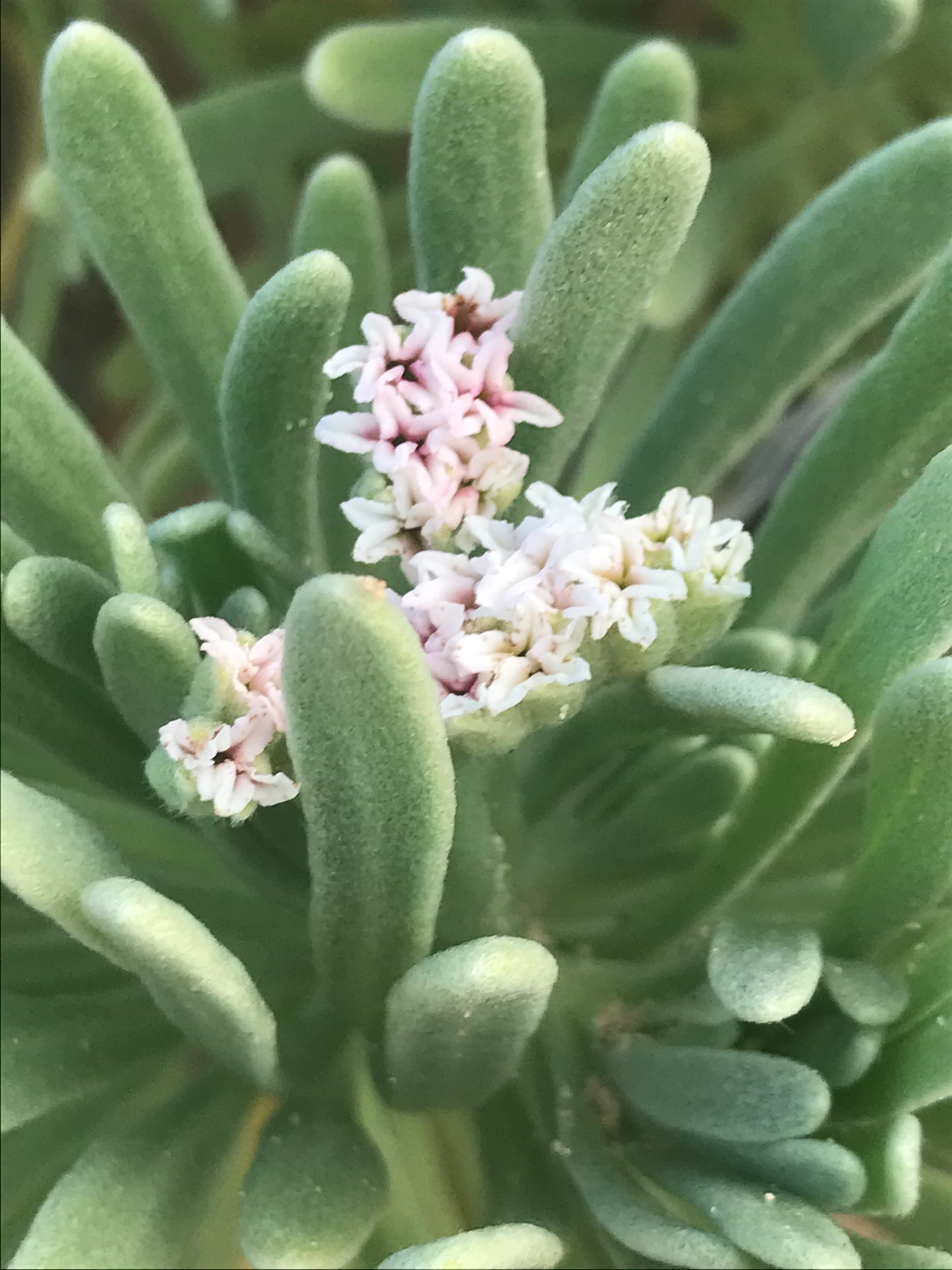
Tournefortia

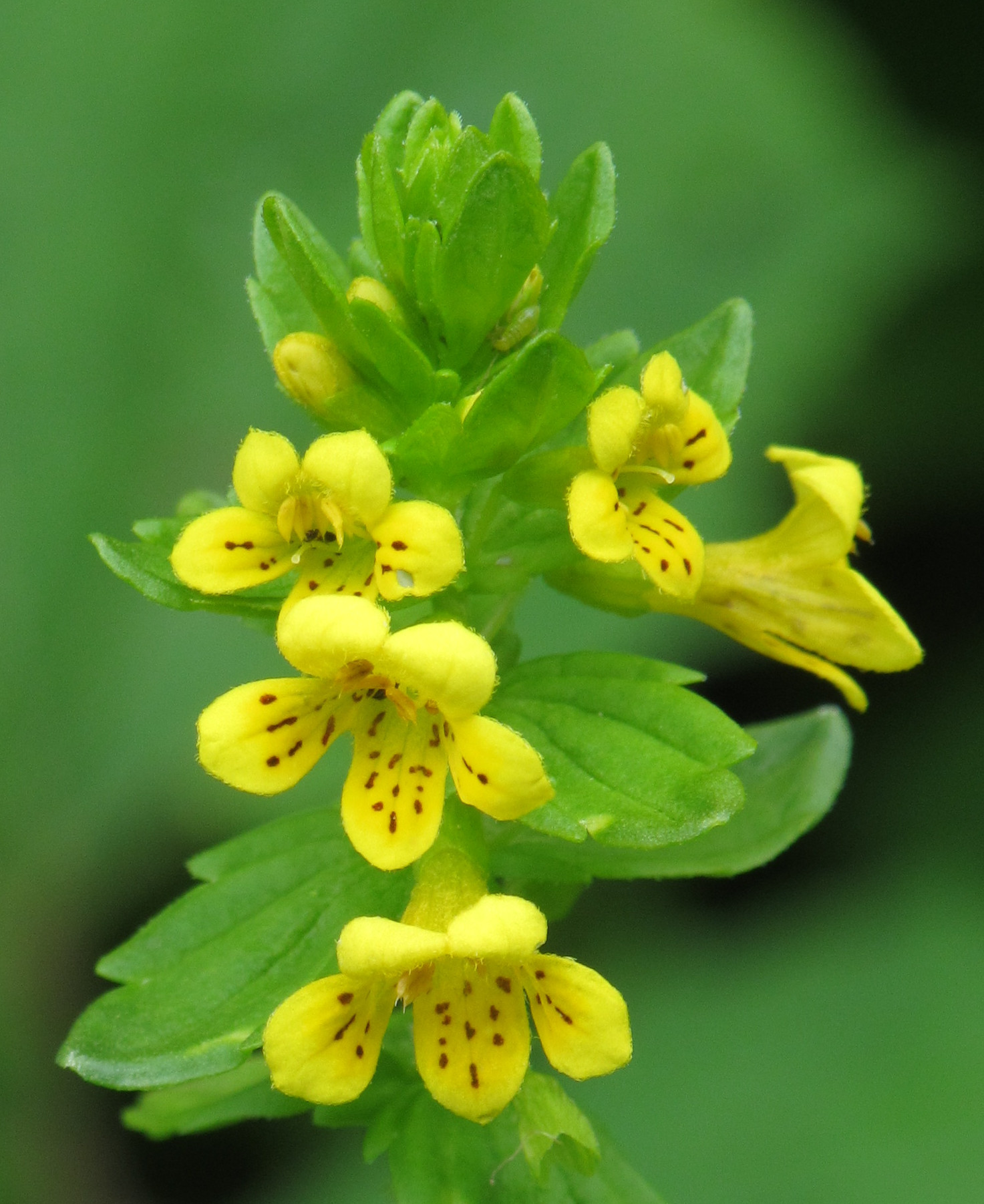
Tozzia

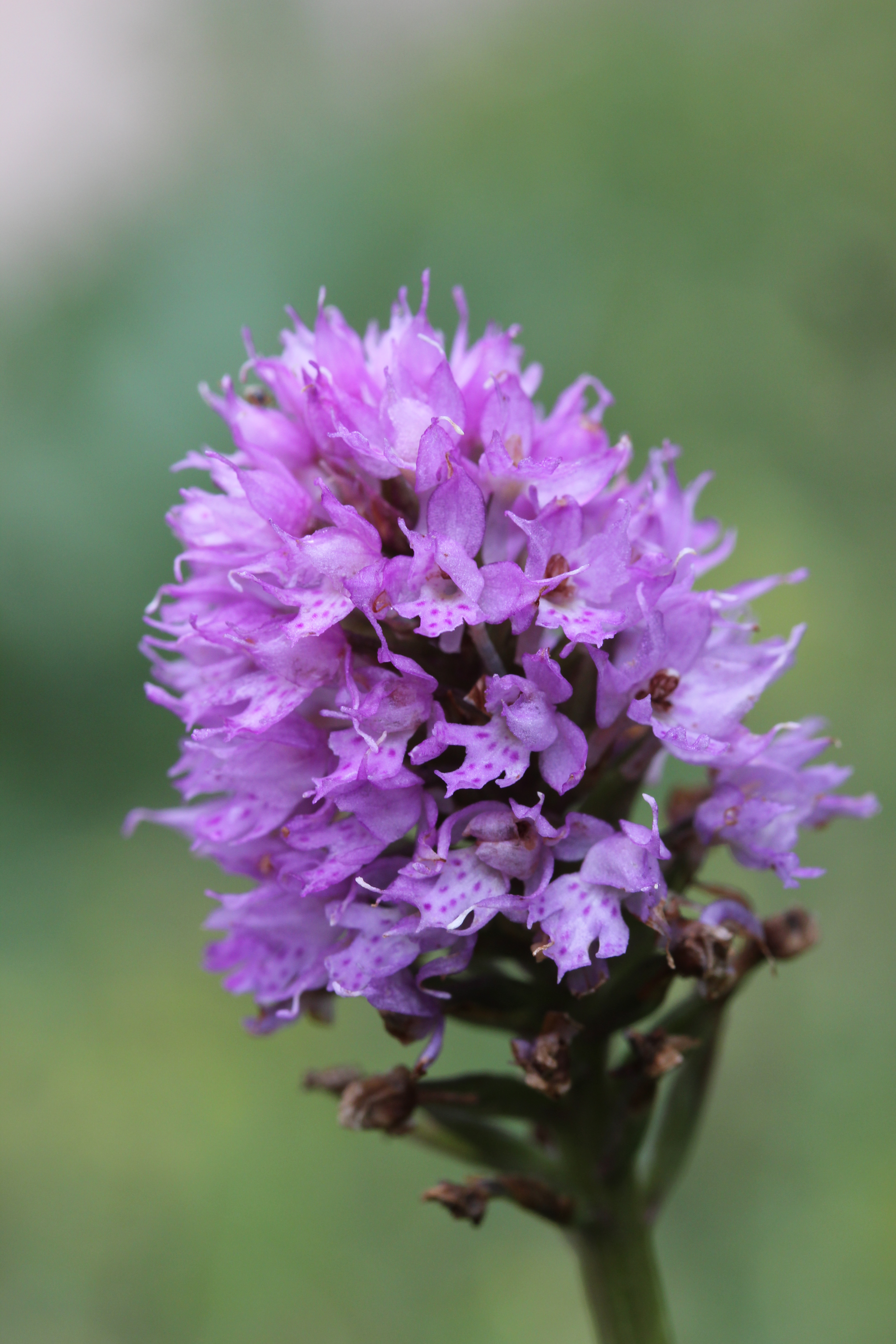
Traunsteinera

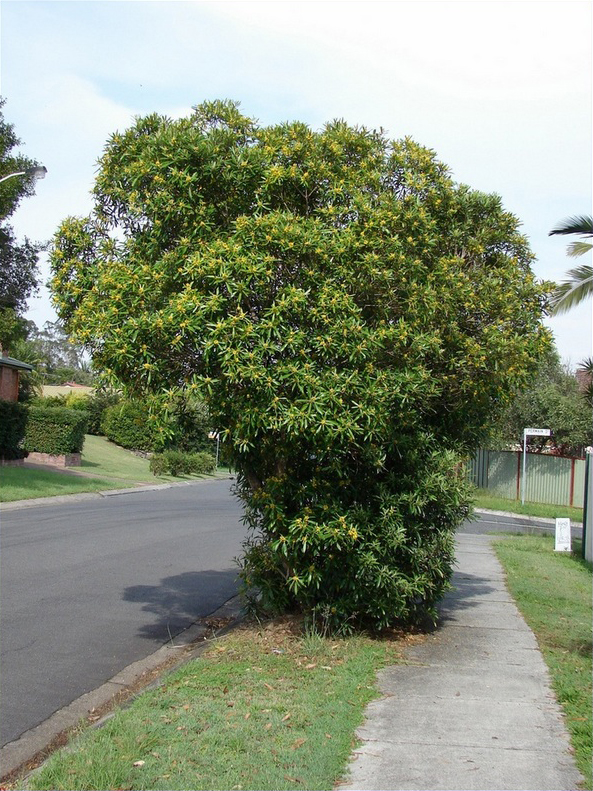
Tristaniopsis

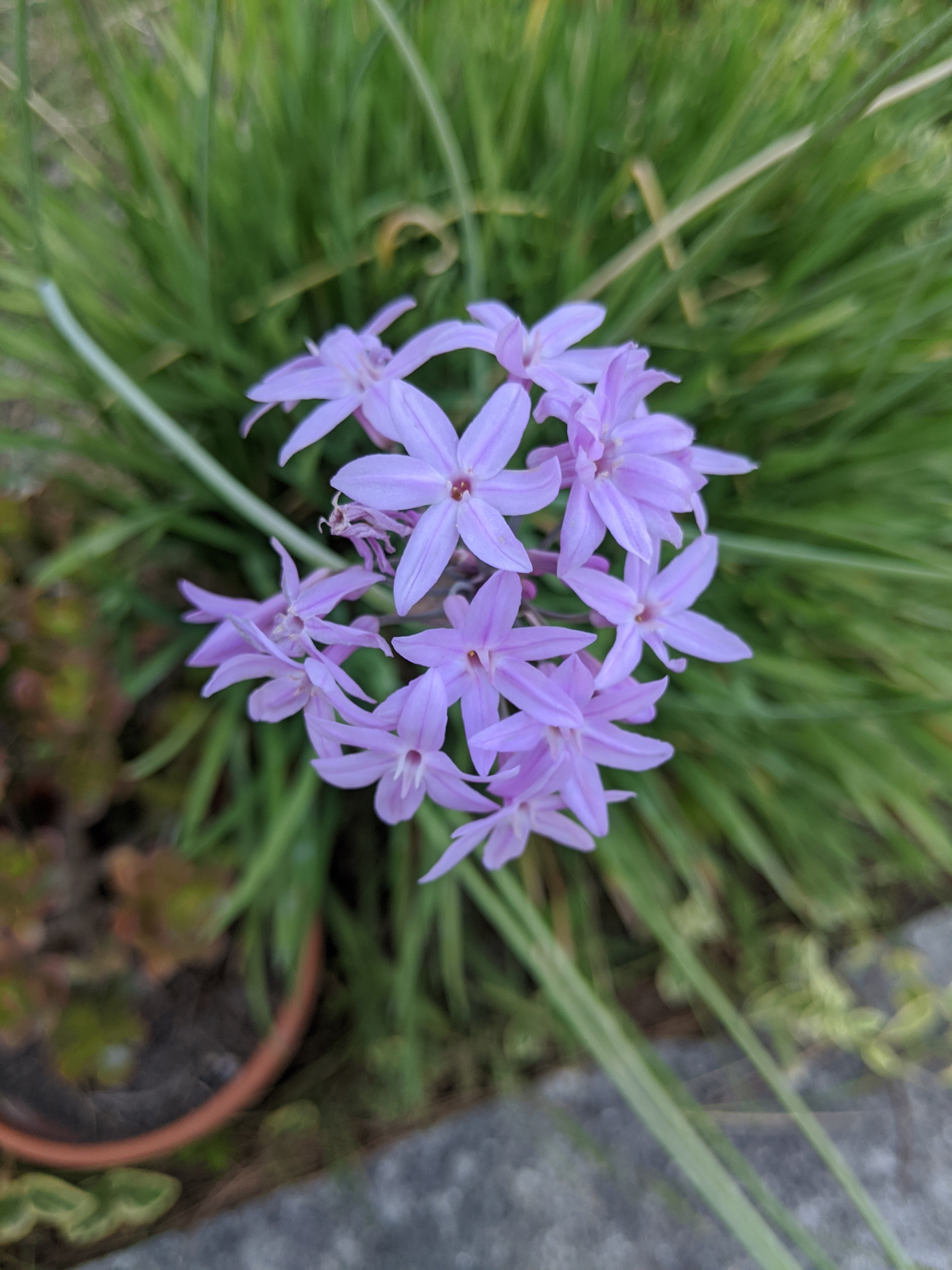
Tulbaghia

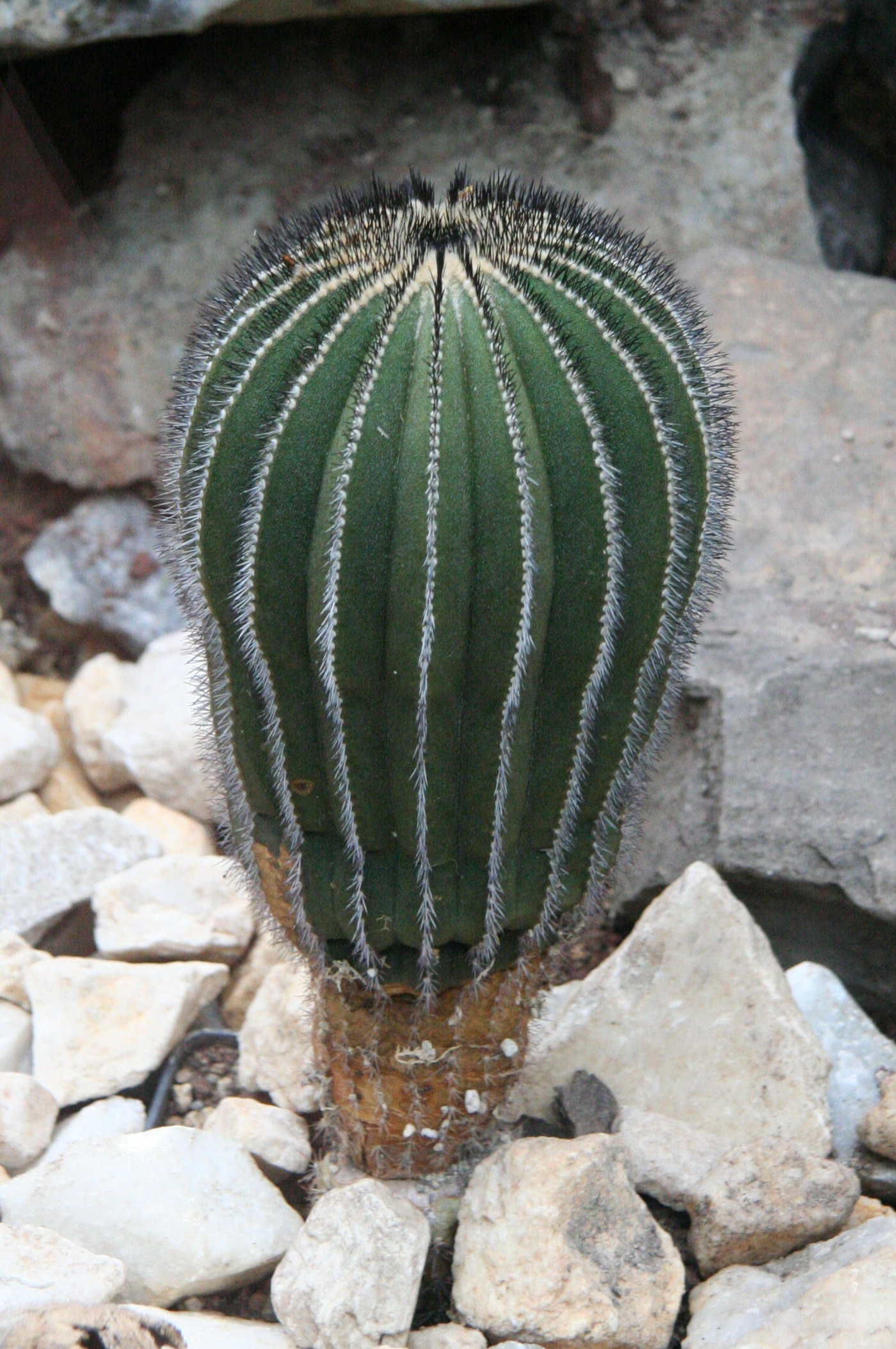
Uebelmannia

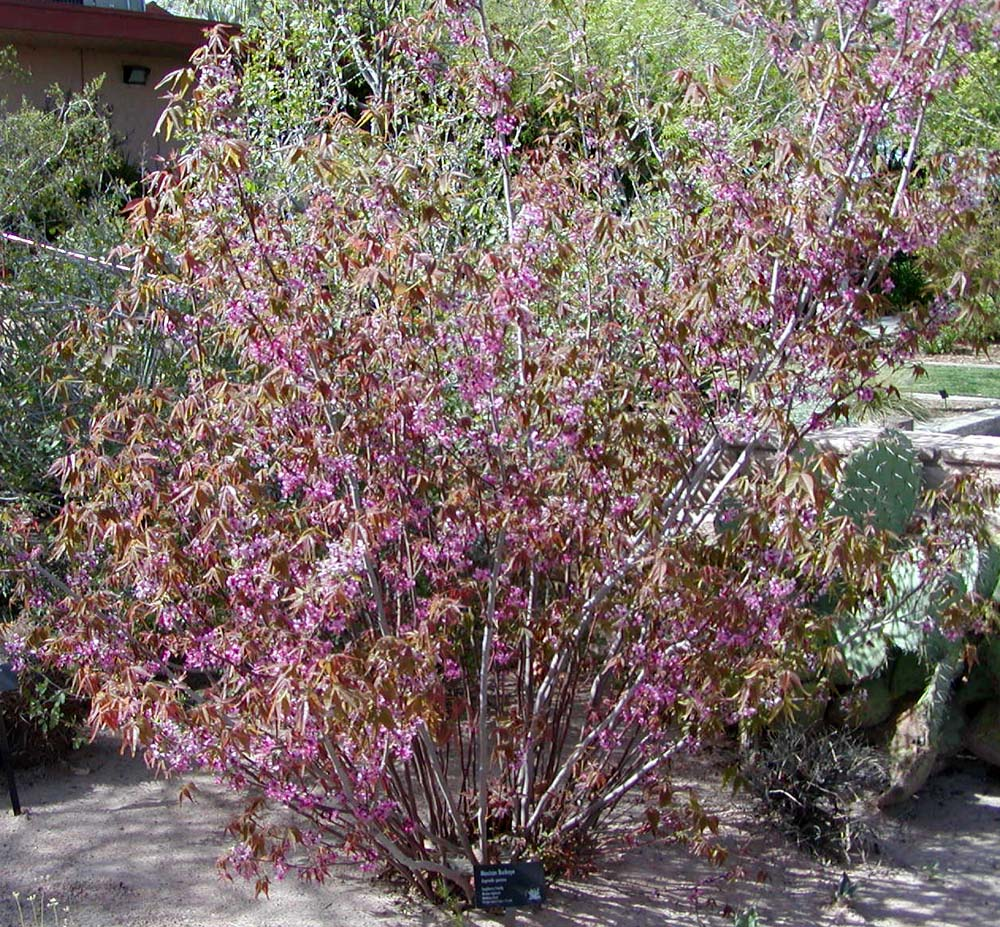
Ungnadia

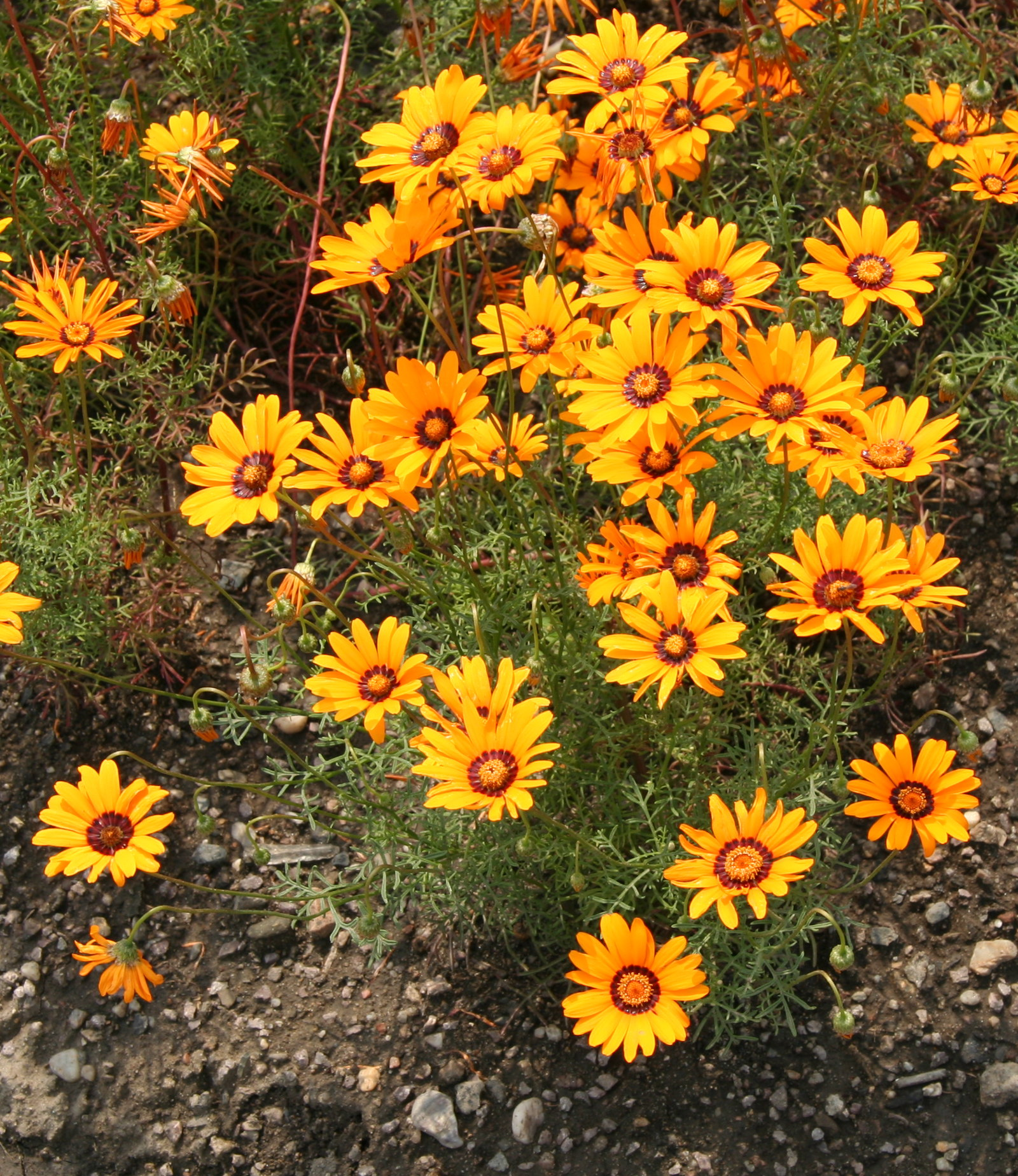
Ursinia

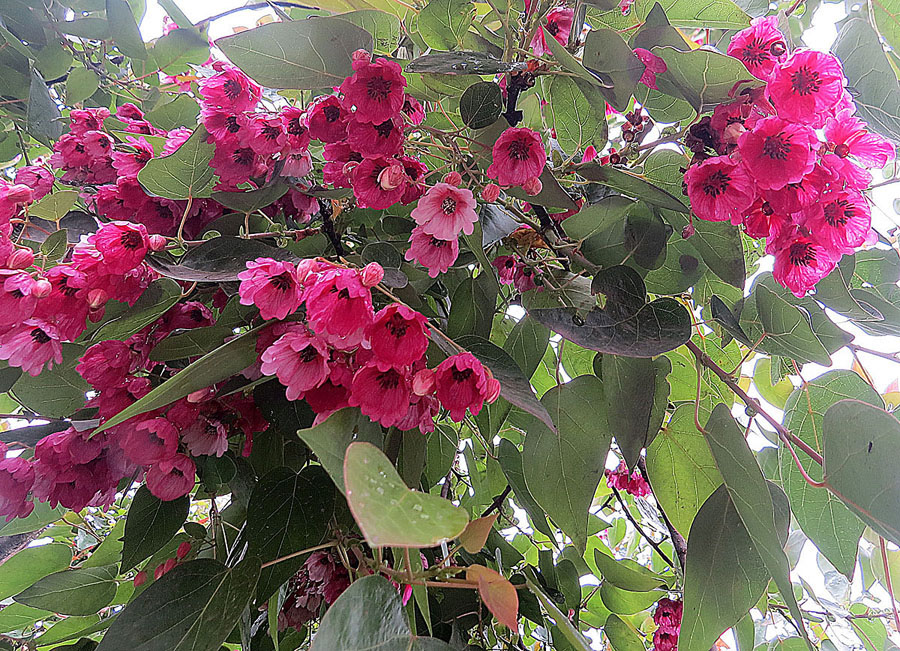
Vallea

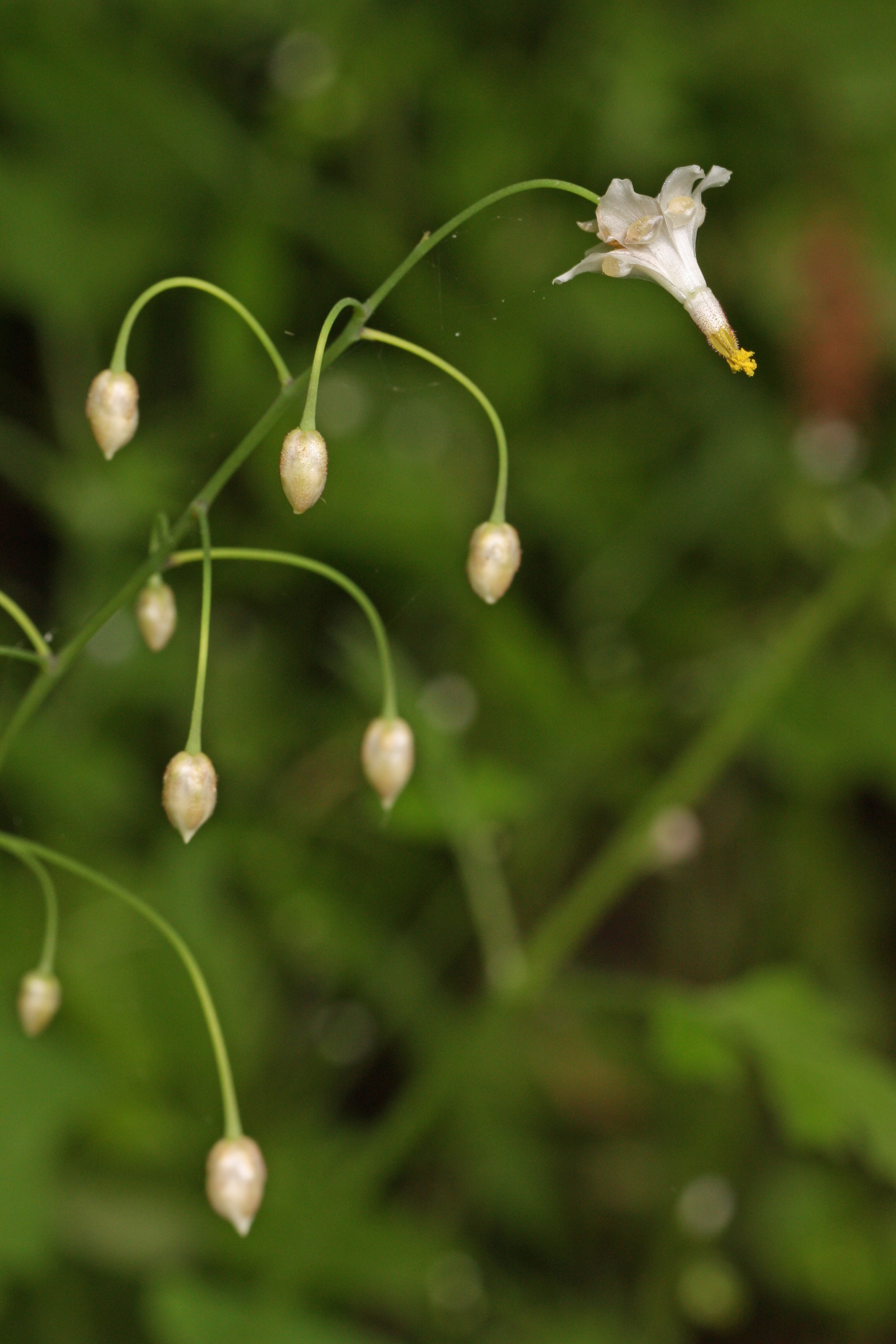
Vancouveria

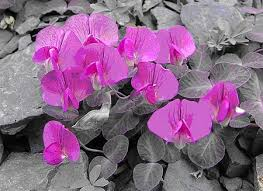
Vavilovia

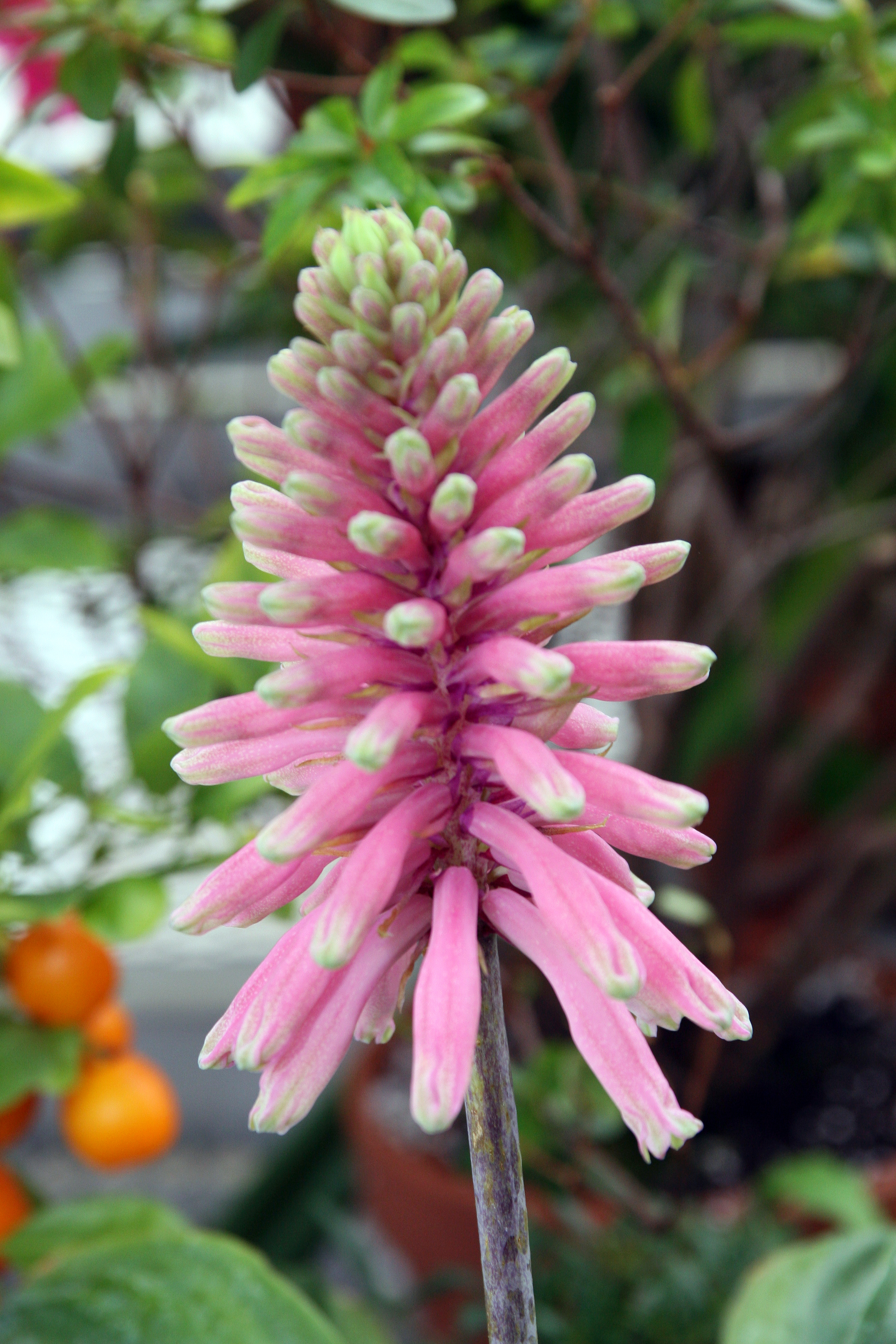
Veltheimia

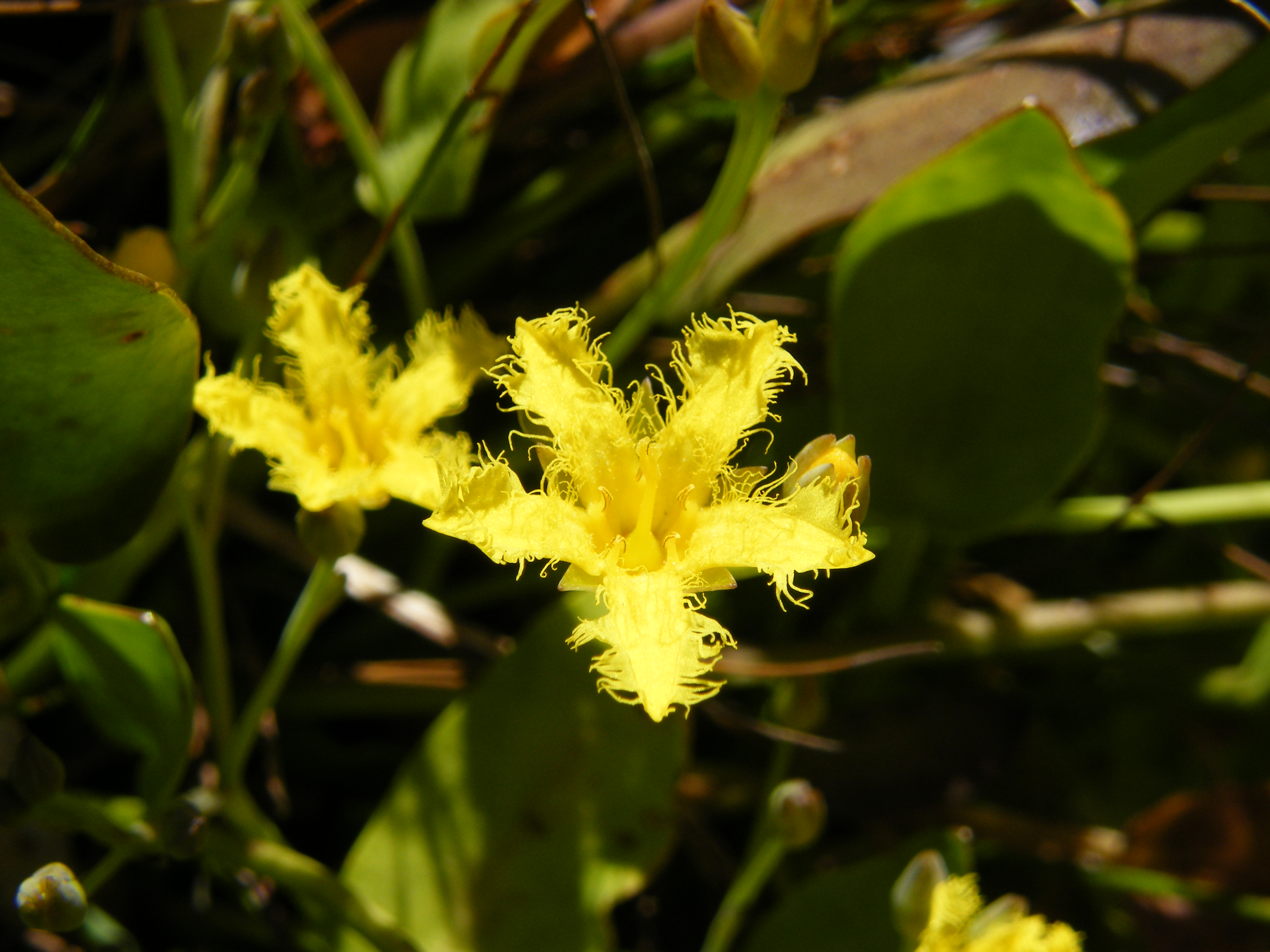
Villarsia

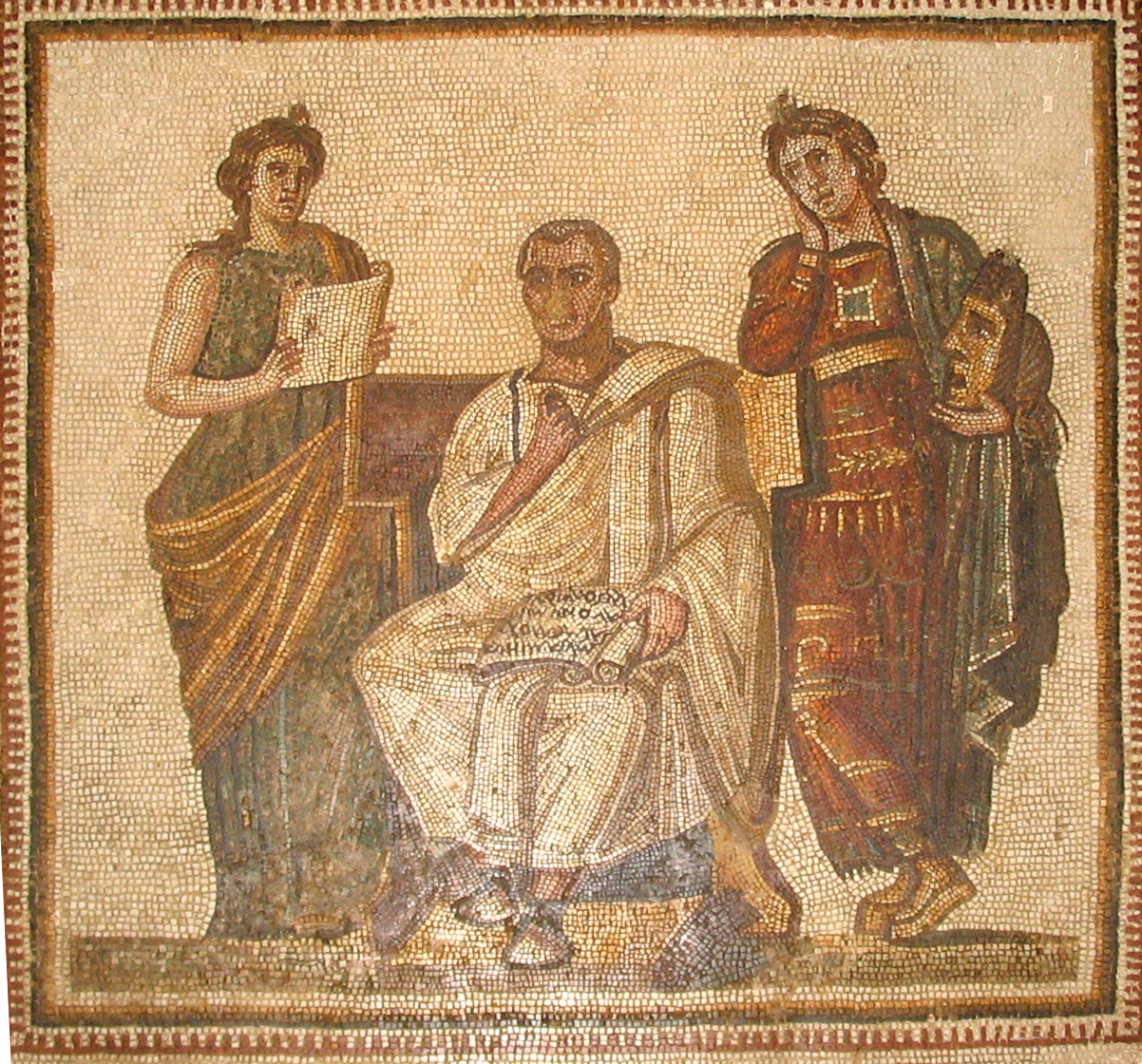
A 3rd-century Roman mosaic of Virgil (seated)

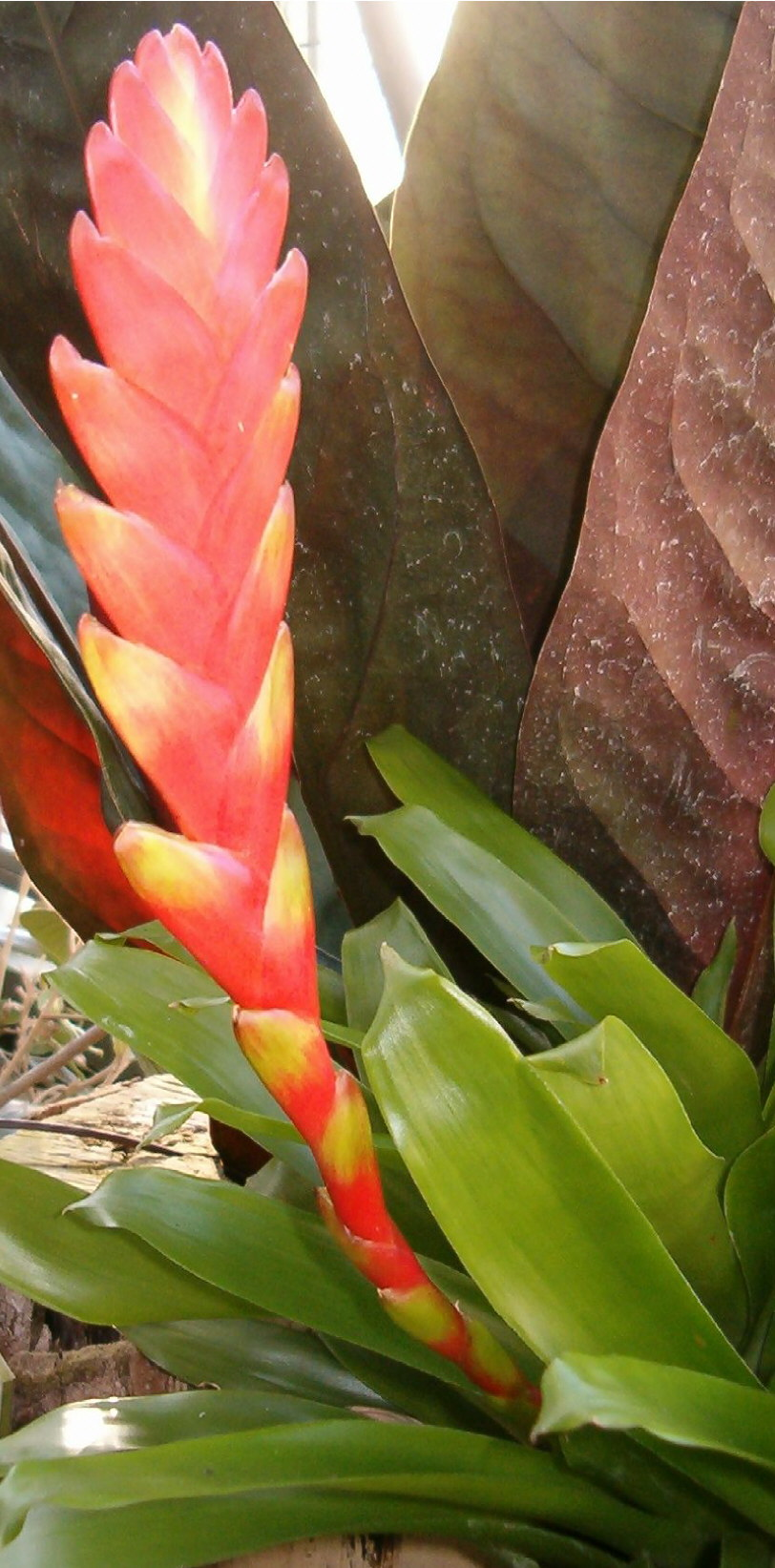
Vriesea

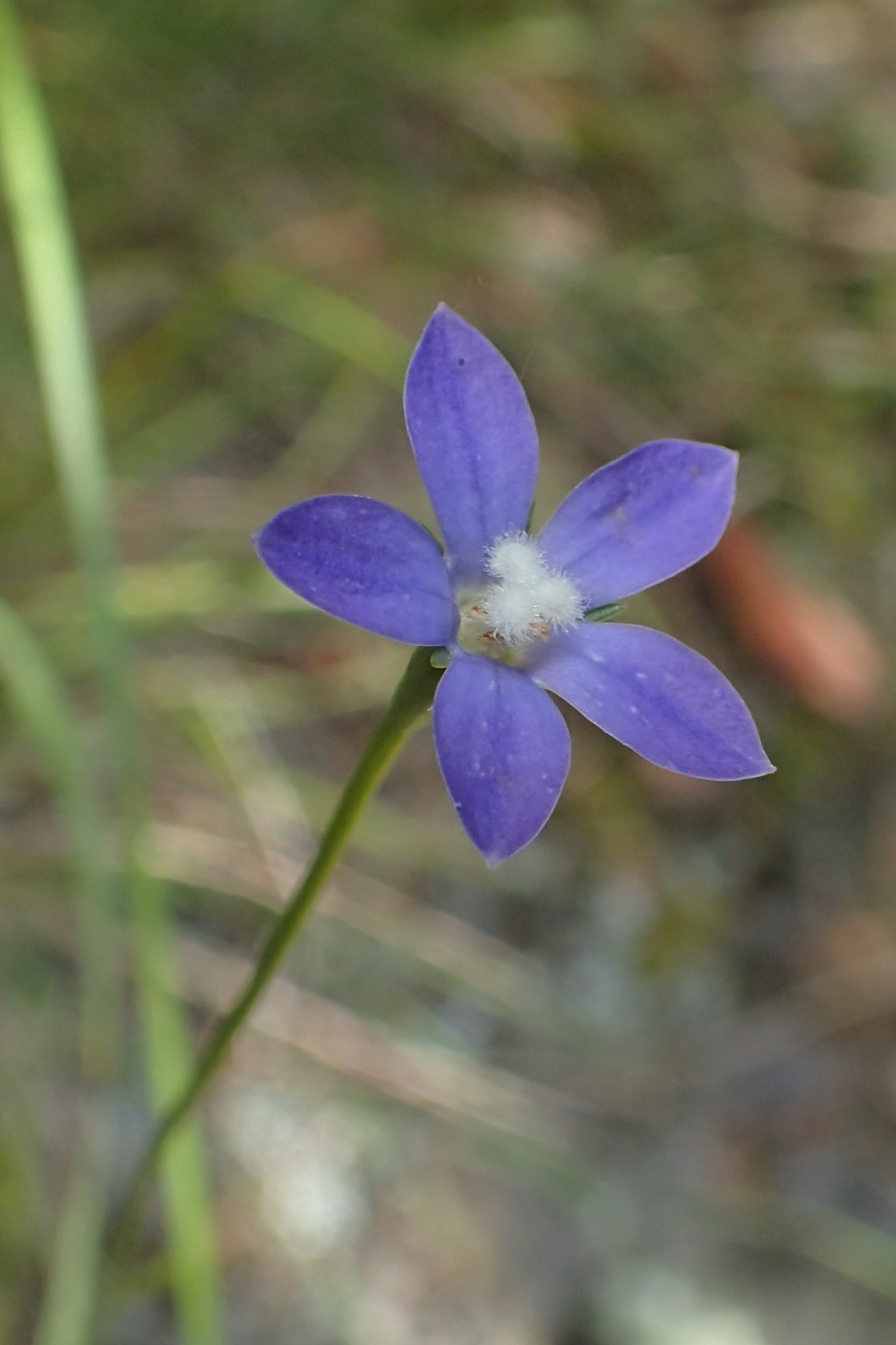
Wahlenbergia

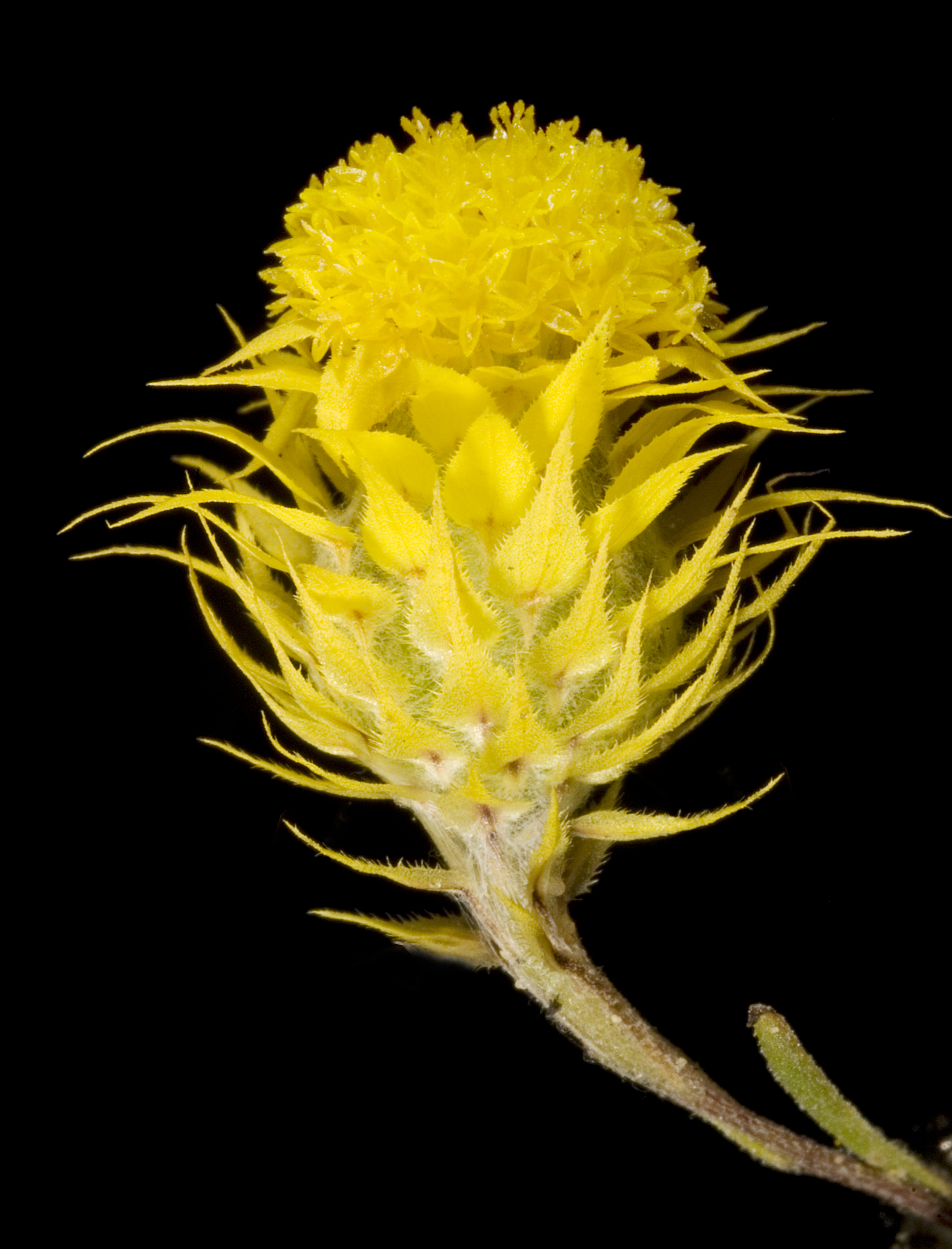
Waitzia

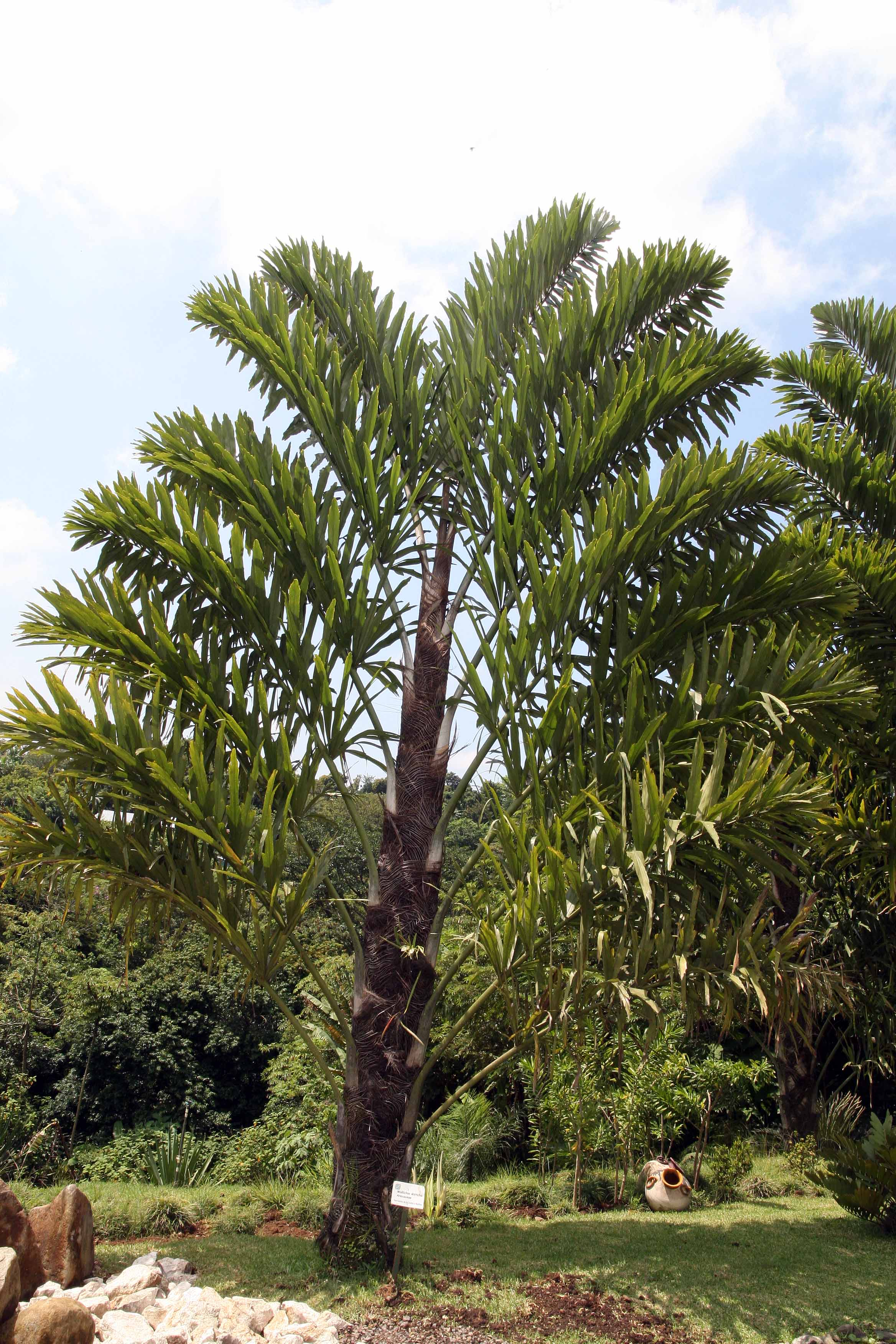
Wallichia

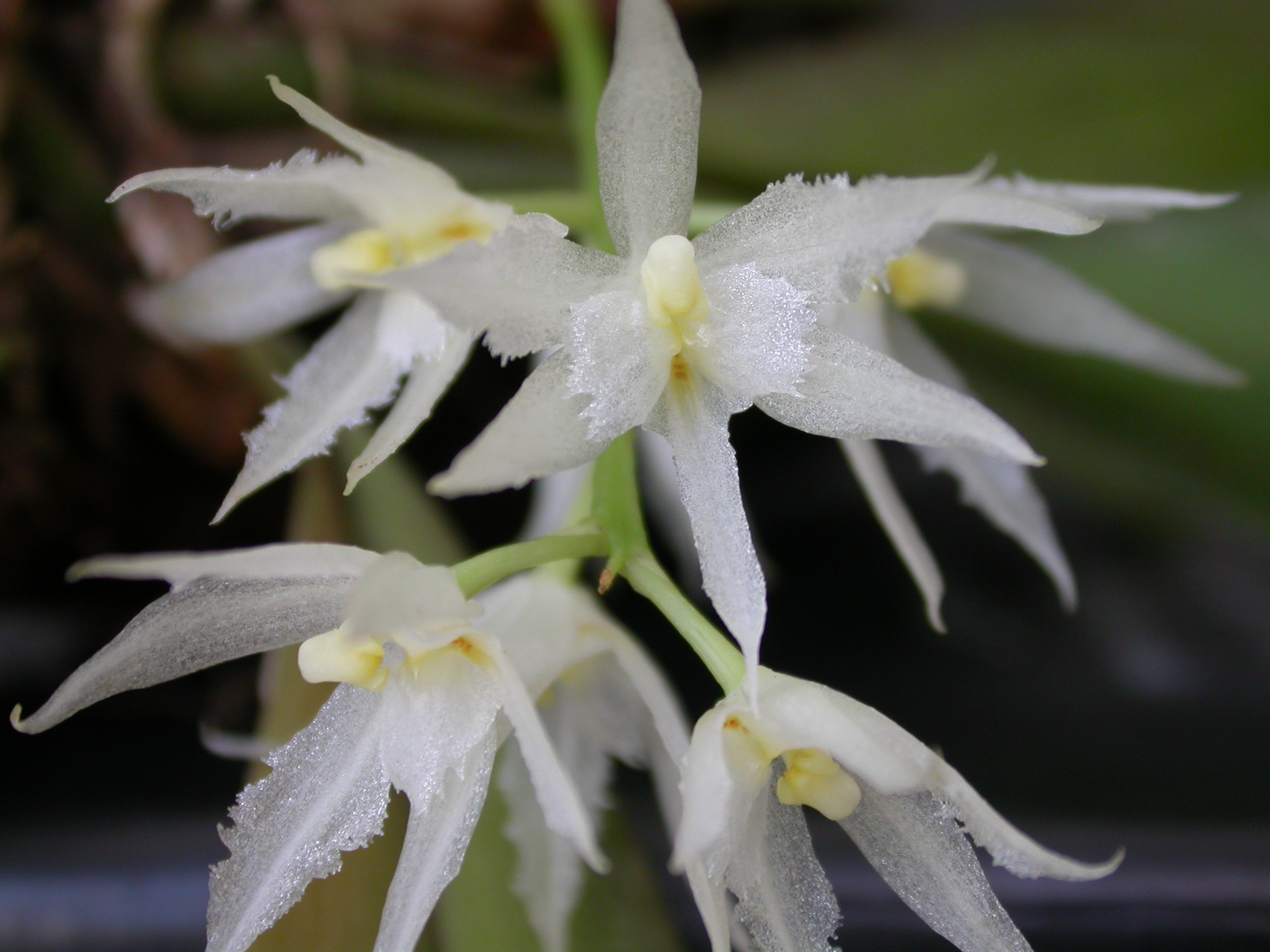
Warmingia

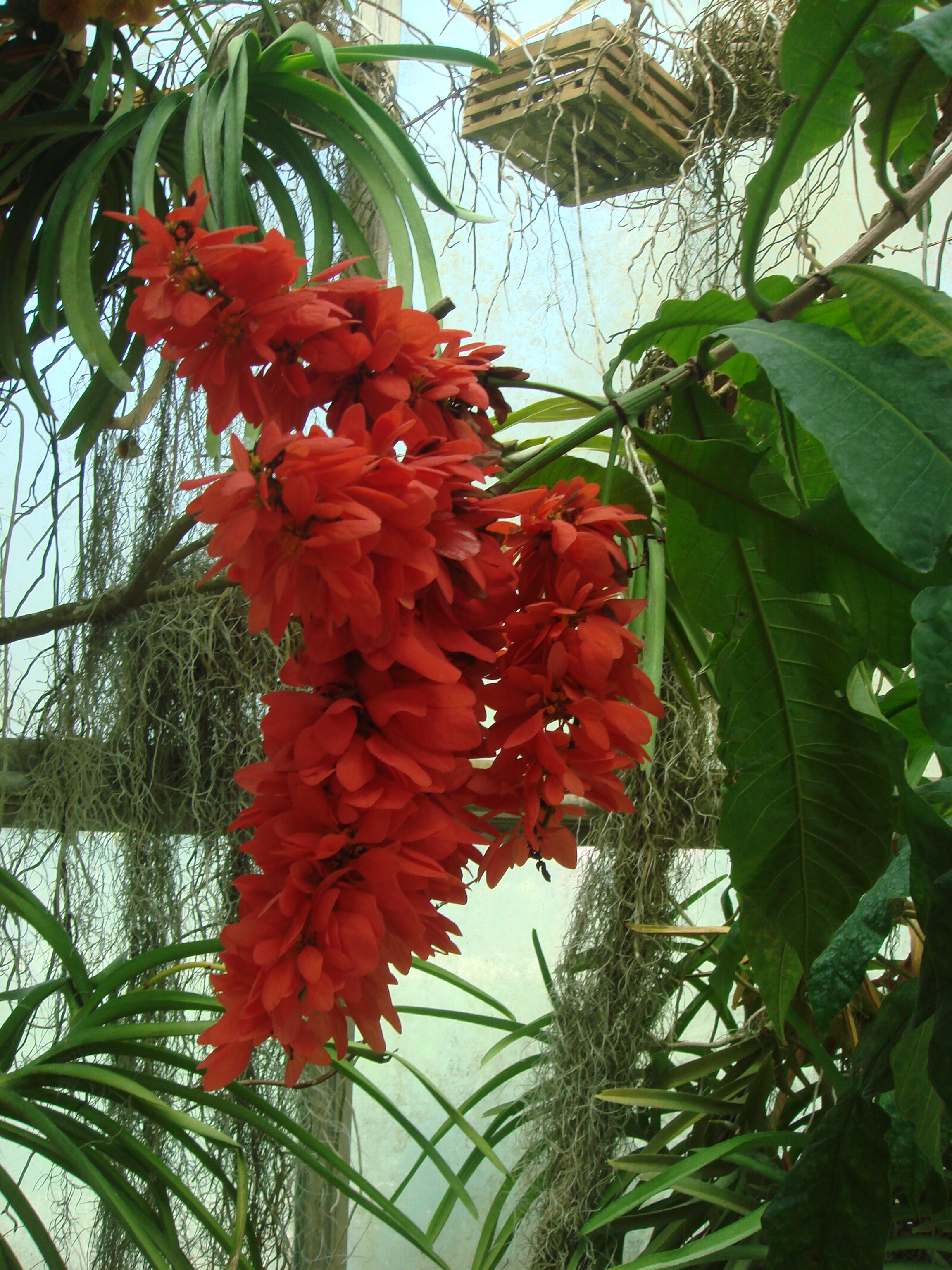
Warszewiczia

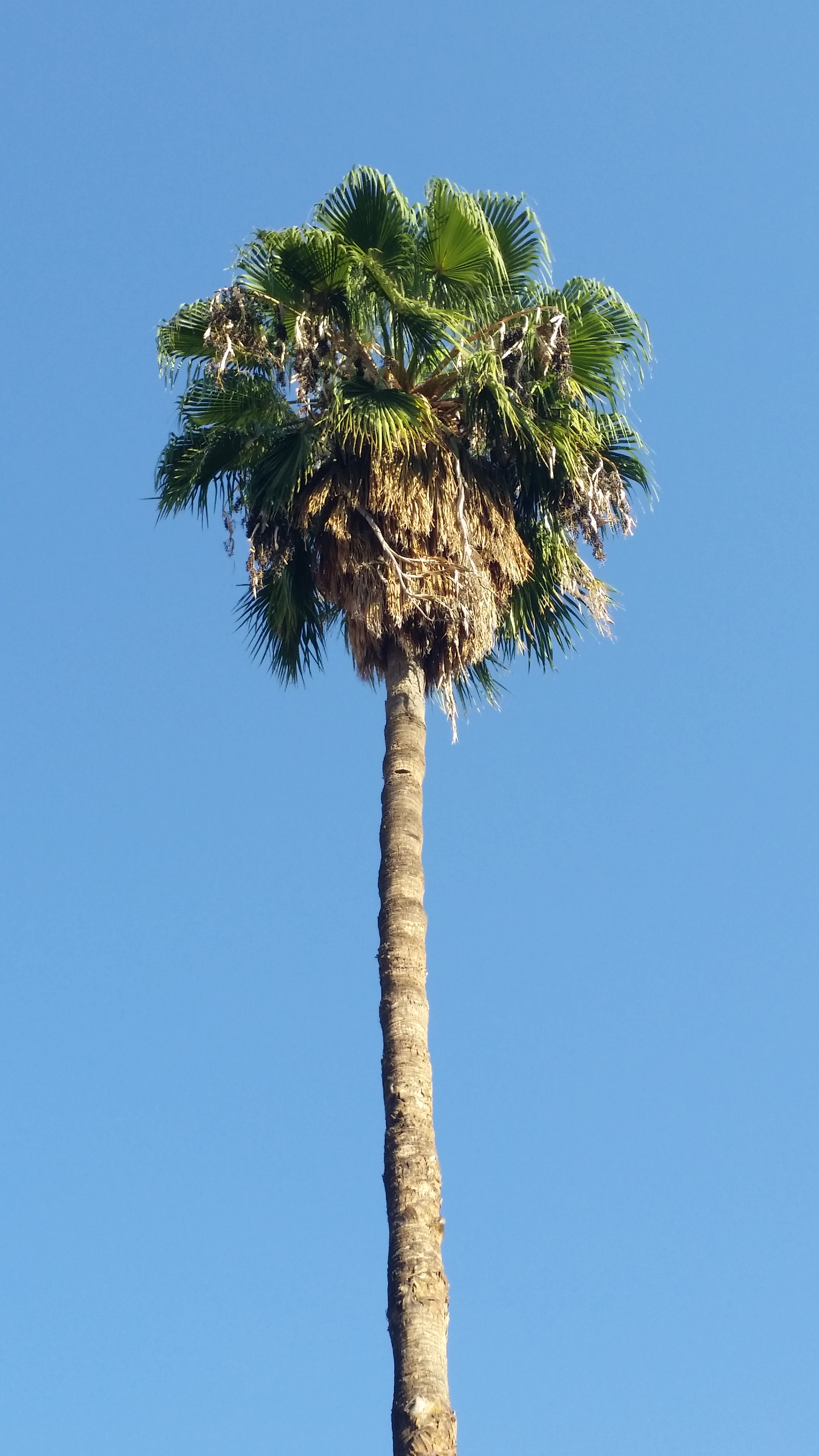
Washingtonia

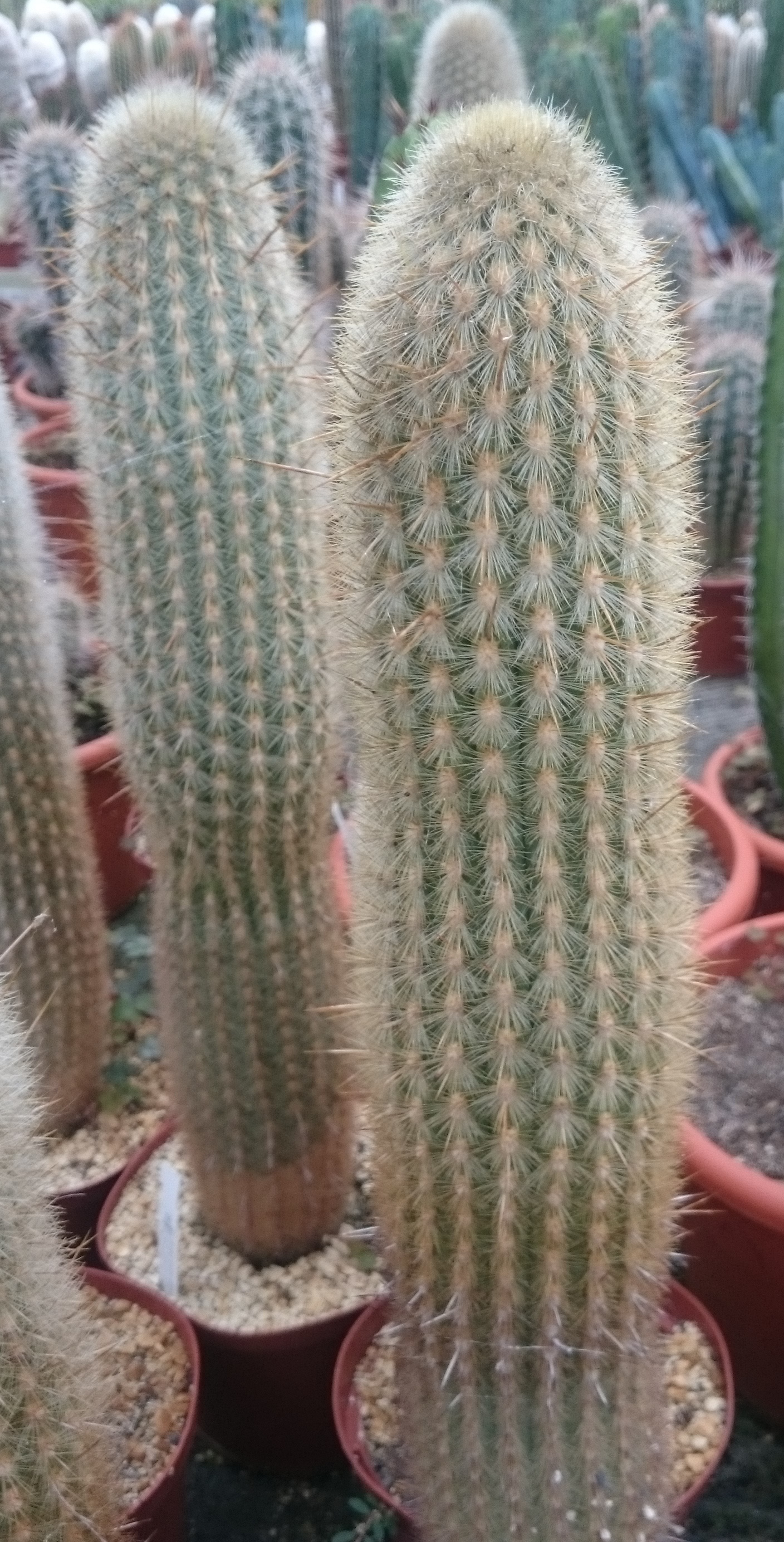
Weberbauerocereus

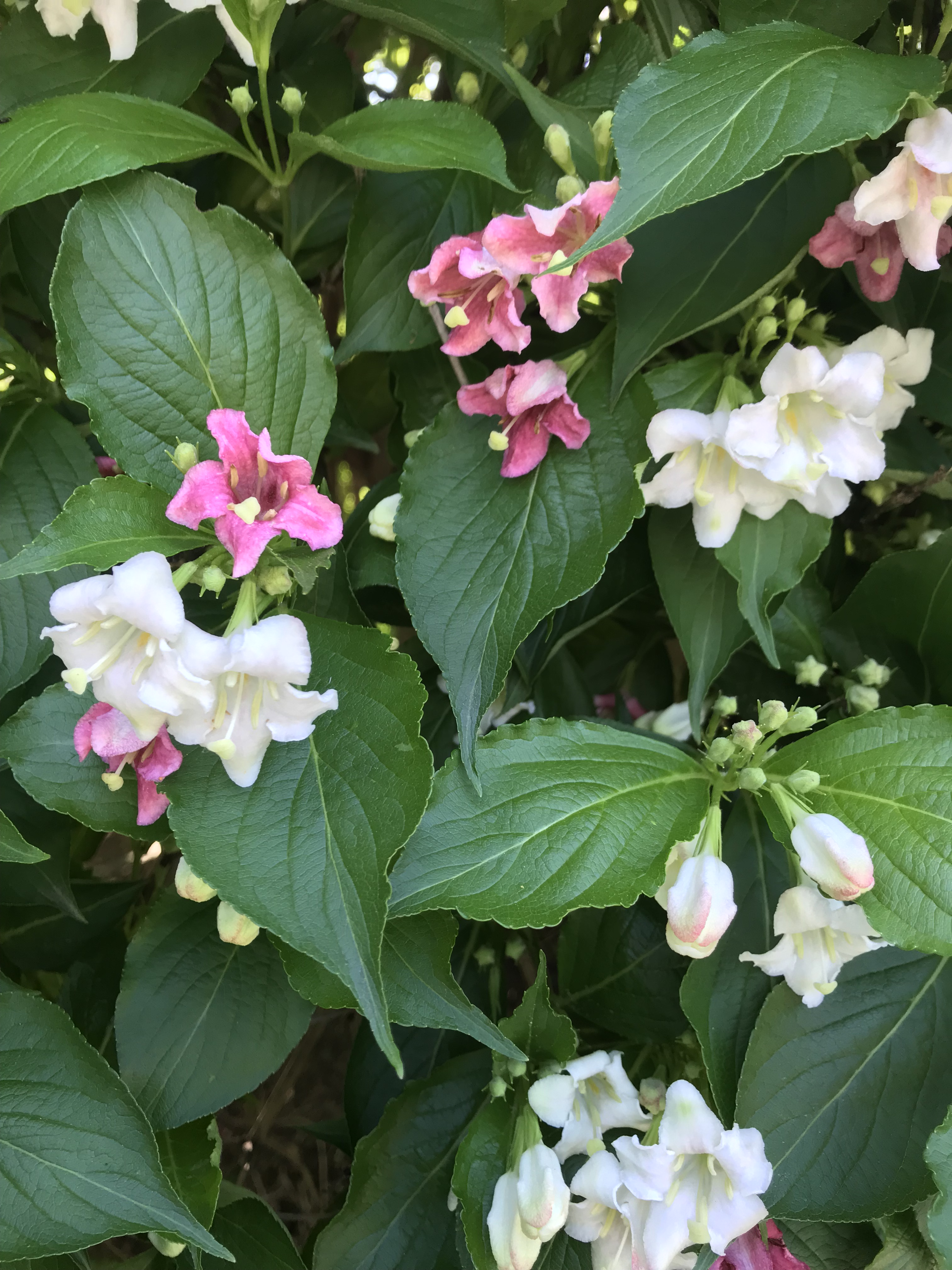
Weigela

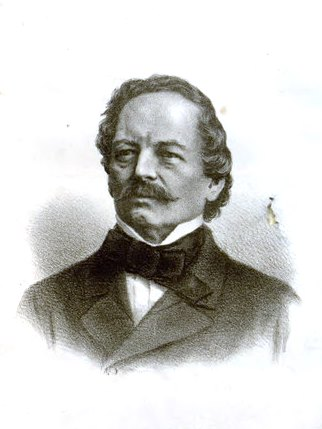
Friedrich Welwitsch

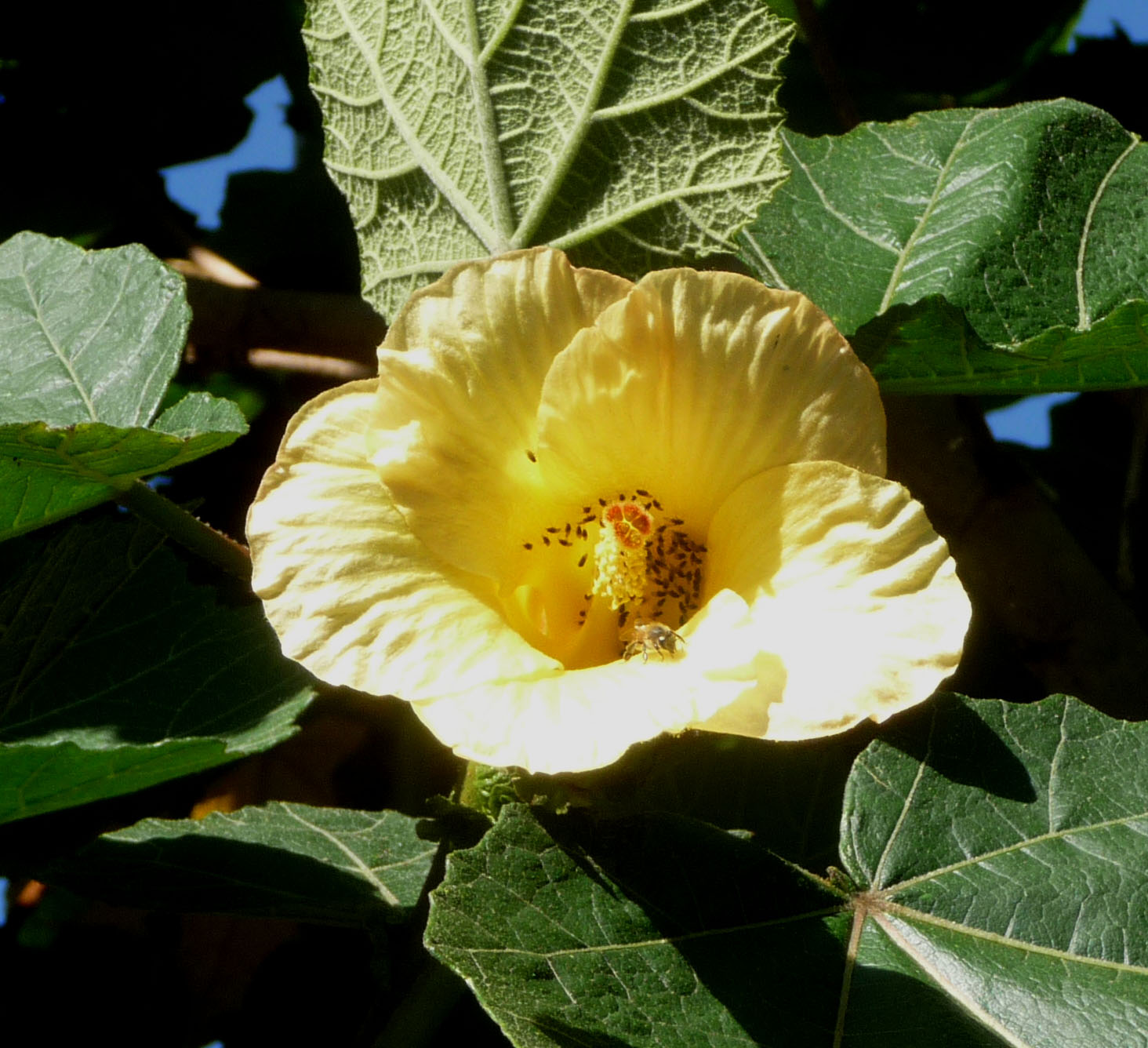
Wercklea

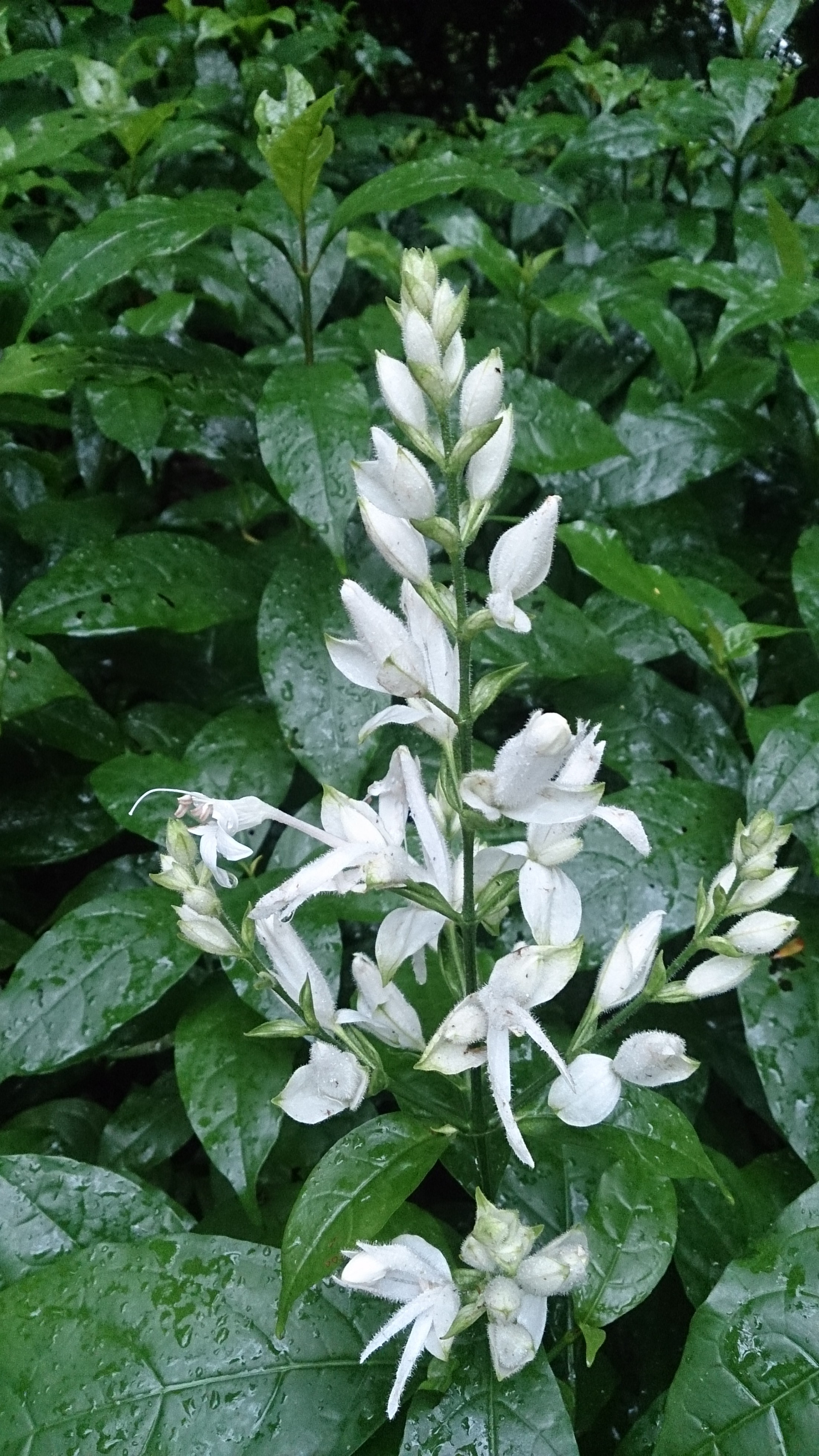
Whitfieldia

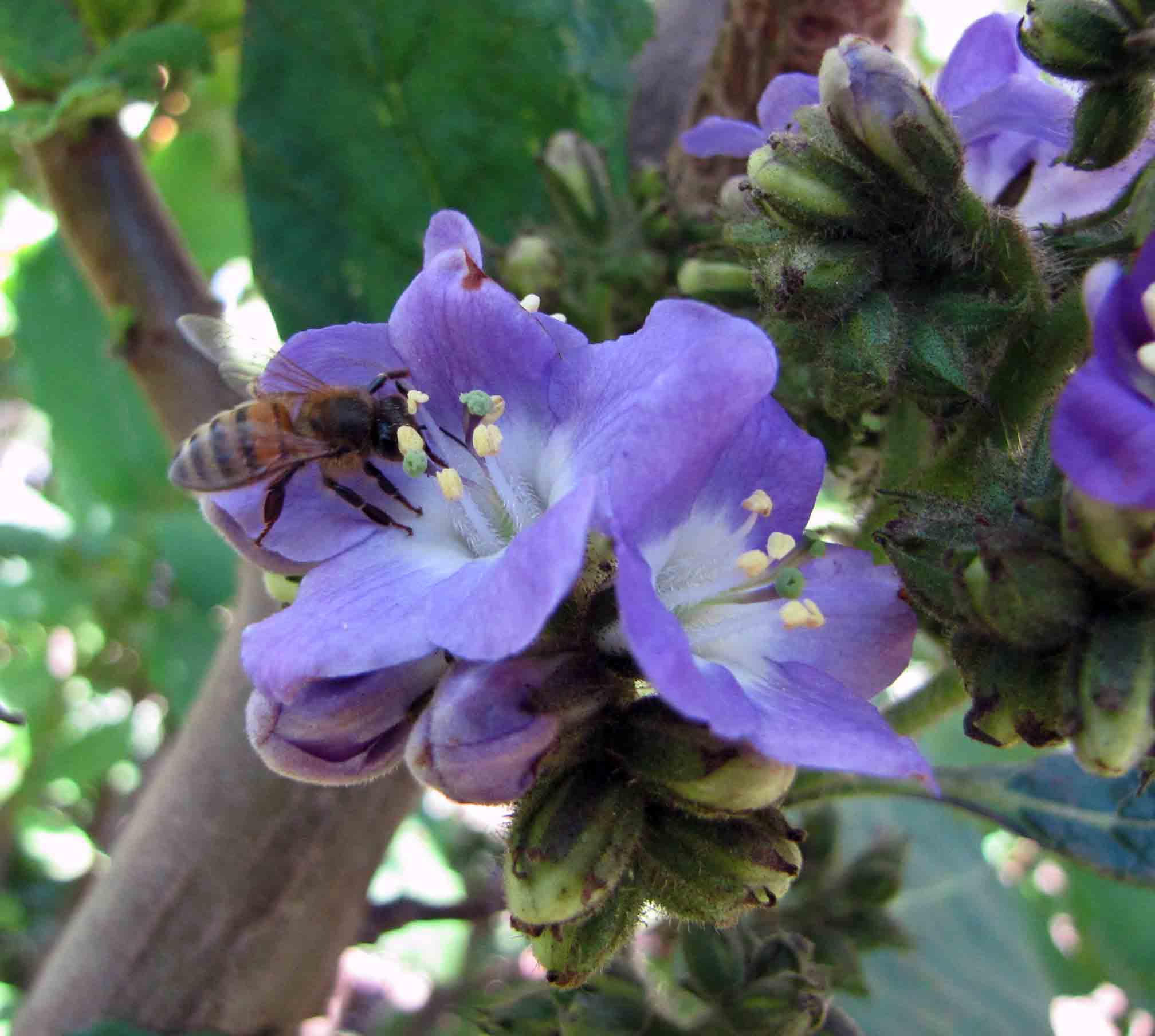
Wigandia

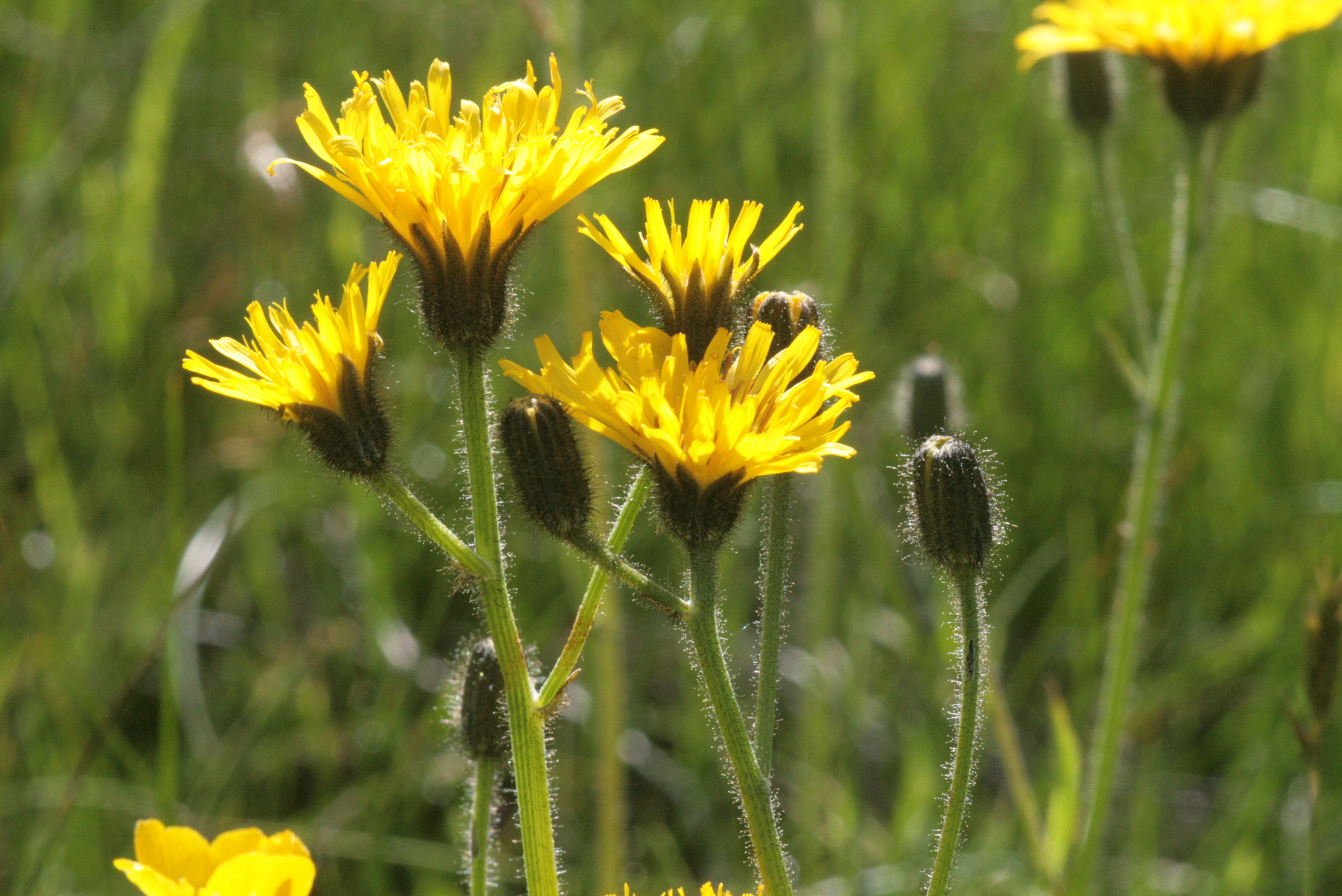
Willemetia

Genera
Genus (Note: Page numbers for references are omitted, since all the references list genera alphabetically except for Plants of the World, which is mainly cited for genera that match their family names.)	Person honored (Note: Except for the people with an indication in their name or description that they were known for something else, all are remembered for their work as naturalists.)	Plant family	Ref
Quassia	Graman Quassi (c. 1690 – c. 1780)	Simaroubaceae	St
Quekettia	Edwin John Quekett (1808–1847)	Orchidaceae	Bu
Quelchia	John Joseph Quelch (1854–1939?), collector of plants in Guyana (Note: Present-day geographical names are used wherever possible.)	Asteraceae	Bu
Quesnelia	Edouard Prosper Quesnel (1781–1850), cotton and shipping merchant	Bromeliaceae	Bu
Quezeliantha	Pierre Ambrunaz Quézel (1926–2015), French doctor, botanist and ecologist	Brassicaceae	Bu
Quinetia	Edgar Quinet (1803–1875), historian	Asteraceae	Bu
Quintinia	Jean-Baptiste de La Quintinie (1626–1688)	Paracryphiaceae	Bu
Quoya	Jean René Constant Quoy (1790–1869)	Lamiaceae	Bu
Rabiea	William Abbot Rabie (1869–1936), South African clergyman and plant collector	Aizoaceae	Bu
Rachelia	Rachel Chisholm, born Kevern (1915–2017), New Zealand farmer at Molesworth Station	Asteraceae	Bu
Racinaea	Racine Sarasy Foster (1910–1991), plant collector in Central and South America with her husband Mulford B. Foster	Bromeliaceae	Bu
Radcliffea	Alan Radcliffe-Smith (1938–2007), English curator for Euphorbiaceae at the Kew Gardens herbarium	Euphorbiaceae	Bu
Raddia	Giuseppe Raddi (1770–1829)	Poaceae	Qu
Raddiella	Giuseppe Raddi (1770–1829)	Poaceae	Qu
Radermachera	Jacob Cornelis Matthieu Radermacher (1741–1783)	Bignoniaceae	Ba
Radlkofera	Ludwig Adolph Timotheus Radlkofer (1829–1927)	Sapindaceae	Bu
Radlkoferotoma	Ludwig Adolph Timotheus Radlkofer (1829–1927)	Asteraceae	Bu
Radyera	Robert Allen Dyer (1900–1987)	Malvaceae	Bu
Raffenaldia	Alire Raffeneau Delile (1778–1850)	Brassicaceae	St
Rafflesia	Stamford Raffles (1781–1826)	Rafflesiaceae	Ch
Rafinesquia	Constantine Samuel Rafinesque (1783–1840)	Asteraceae	Bu
Rafnia	Carl Gottlob Rafn (1769–1808)	Fabaceae	Bu
Raillardella	Laurent Railliard or Raillard (1792–1845), French naval officer; introduced to botany by Charles Gaudichaud-Beaupré	Asteraceae	Bu
Raimondia	Antonio Raimondi (1826–1890)	Annonaceae	Bu
Rainiera	Peter Rainier (1741–1808), Royal Navy officer	Asteraceae	Bt
Ramirezella	José Aurelio Ramirez Mateos (1852–1904), Mexican doctor, botanist and zoologist	Fabaceae	Bu
Ramonda	Louis Ramond de Carbonnières (1755–1827)	Gesneriaceae	Co
Ramonadoxa	Ramona Oviedo Prieto (b.1953), Cuban botanist and agriculturist, who worked at the Institute of Ecology and Systematics (Cuban Academy of Sciences)	Rubiaceae	Bt
Ramorinoa	Juan Ramorino (1840–1876), Italian botanist and paleontologist; professor of natural science and mineralogy	Fabaceae	Bu
Ramosmania	Raman Osman (1902–1992), governor-general	Rubiaceae	Bu
Randia	Isaac Rand (1674–1743)	Rubiaceae	St
Randonia	Jacques Louis Randon (1795–1871), colonial administrator	Resedaceae	Bu
Ranzania	Ono Ranzan (1729–1810)	Berberidaceae	St
Raoulia	Étienne Raoul (1815–1852)	Asteraceae	St
Raouliopsis	Étienne Raoul (1815–1852)	Asteraceae	Bu
Ratzeburgia	Julius Theodor Christian Ratzeburg (1801–1871)	Poaceae	Bu
Rauhia	Werner Rauh (1913–2000)	Amaryllidaceae	Qu
Rauhiella	Werner Rauh (1913–2000)	Orchidaceae	Qu
Rauhocereus	Werner Rauh (1913–2000)	Cactaceae	Qu
Rauia	Ambrosius Rau (1784–1830), German botanist and mineralogist; professor of natural history and forestry	Rutaceae	Bu
Raulinoa	Raulino Reitz (1919–1990), Brazilian clergyman, historian, botanist, and botanical garden director	Rutaceae	Bu
Raulinoreitzia	Raulino Reitz (1919–1990), Brazilian clergyman, historian, botanist, and botanical garden director	Asteraceae	Bu
Rauvolfia	Leonhard Rauwolf (c. 1537 – 1596)	Apocynaceae	St
Ravenea	Louis Fréderic Jacques Ravené (1823–1879), official in Berlin	Arecaceae	Qu
Ravenia	Jean François Ravin (18th century), French doctor, professor of botany and medicine at the University of Coimbra in Portugal	Rutaceae	Bu
Raveniopsis	Jean François Ravin (18th century), French doctor, professor of botany and medicine at the University of Coimbra in Portugal	Rutaceae	Bu
Ravenochloa	Peter H. Raven (1936–), American botanist and environmentalist	Poaceae	
Rawsonia	Rawson W. Rawson (1812–1899), colonial administrator	Achariaceae	Bu
Rayjacksonia	Raymond Carl Jackson (1928–2008)	Asteraceae	Bu
Razafimandimbisonia	Sylvaen Georges Razafimandimbison (b. 1964), botanist from Madagascar	Rubiaceae	Bu
Reaumuria	René Antoine Ferchault de Réaumur (1683–1757)	Tamaricaceae	Bu
Rebutia	Pierre Rebut (1827–1902)	Cactaceae	St
Recchia	Nardo Antonio Recchi (1540–1595), Italian royal personal physician	Simaroubaceae	Bu
Recordia	Samuel J. Record (1881–1945)	Verbenaceae	Bu
Recordoxylon	Samuel J. Record (1881–1945)	Fabaceae	Bu
Reedia	Joseph Reed (c. 1823 – 1890), architect	Cyperaceae	Bu
Reevesia	John Reeves (1774–1856)	Malvaceae	Bu
Regnellidium	Anders Fredrik Regnell (1807–1884)	Marsileaceae	Bt
Rehdera	Alfred Rehder (1863–1949)	Verbenaceae	Qu
Rehderodendron	Alfred Rehder (1863–1949)	Styracaceae	Ba
Rehia	Richard Eric Holttum (1895–1990)	Poaceae	Bu
Rehmannia	Joseph Rehmann (1779–1831), physician in Saint Petersburg	Orobanchaceae	Co
Reichardia	Johann Jacob Reichard (1743–1782)	Asteraceae	Bu
Reicheella	Karl Friedrich Reiche (1860–1929)	Caryophyllaceae	Bu
Reichenbachia	Ludwig Reichenbach (1793–1879)	Nyctaginaceae	Bu
Reicheocactus	Karl Friedrich Reiche (1860–1929)	Cactaceae	Bt
Reineckea	Johann Heinrich Julius Reinecke (1799–1871), German horticulturist	Asparagaceae	Ba
Reinhardtia	Johannes Theodor Reinhardt (1816–1882)	Arecaceae	Bu
Reinwardtia	Caspar Georg Carl Reinwardt (1773–1854)	Linaceae	St
Reinwardtiodendron	Caspar Georg Carl Reinwardt (1773–1854)	Meliaceae	Bu
Reissantia	Charles Tisserant (1886–1962), French clergyman, botanist and plant collector	Celastraceae	Bu
Reissekia	Siegfried Reissek (1819–1871)	Rhamnaceae	Bu
Reitzia	Raulino Reitz (1919–1990), Brazilian clergyman, historian, botanist, and botanical garden director	Poaceae	Bu
Relchela	Willibald Lechler (1814–1856), German apothecary, botanist and explorer	Poaceae	Bu
Reldia	Robert Louis Dressler (b. 1927)	Gesneriaceae	Bu
Remijia	Remijo or Remigio, Brazilian doctor who wrote about the uses of Cinchona bark	Rubiaceae	Bu
Remusatia	Jean-Pierre Abel-Rémusat (1788–1832), sinologist	Araceae	St
Remya	Jules Rémy (1826–1893)	Asteraceae	Bu
Renealmia	Paul Reneaulme (1560–1624), French physician and botanical author	Zingiberaceae	St
Rennellia	James Rennell (1742–1830)	Rubiaceae	Bu
Renschia	Carl Wilhelm Rensch (1837–1905), German teacher in Berlin	Lamiaceae	Bu
Rensonia	Carlos Renson (1858–1941), Belgian apothecary who collected plants in San Salvador, El Salvador	Asteraceae	Bu
Renvoizea	Stephen Andrew Renvoize (b. 1944), English botanist who worked at Kew Gardens, specialist in grasses	Poaceae	Bu
Requienia	Esprit Requien (1788–1851)	Fabaceae	Bu
Resia	Richard Evans Schultes (1915–2001)	Gesneriaceae	Bu
Restella	Georg Wilhelm Steller (1709–1746)	Thymelaeaceae	Bu
Restrepia	José Manuel Restrepo Vélez (1781–1863)	Orchidaceae	Qu
Restrepiella	José Manuel Restrepo Vélez (1781–1863)	Orchidaceae	Qu
Reyesia	Antonio García Reyes (1817–1855), Chilean botanist; university professor in Chile	Solanaceae	Bu
Reynaudia	Auguste Adolphe Marc Reynaud (1804–1867)	Poaceae	Bu
Reynosia	Alvaro Francisco Carlos Reynoso y Valdés (1829–1888), Cuban agronomist and chemist in Havana	Rhamnaceae	Bu
Reynoutria	Karel van Sint-Omaars (c. 1532 – 1569), Lord of Dranouter, Flemish botanist	Polygonaceae	St
Rhazya	Muhammad ibn Zakariya al-Razi (10th century)	Apocynaceae	St
Rhodosciadium	Joseph Nelson Rose (1862–1928)	Apiaceae	Bu
Rhodoscirpus	Encarnación Rosa Guaglianone (1932–2014), Argentinian botanist; specialist in Cyperaceae	Cyperaceae	Bu
Richardia	Richard Richardson (1663–1741)	Rubiaceae	St
Richardsiella	Mary Alice Eleanor Richards (1895–1977)	Poaceae	Bu
Richea	Claude Riche (1762–1797)	Ericaceae	St
Richeria	Pierre Richer de Belleval (c. 1564 – 1632)	Phyllanthaceae	Bu
Richterago	Hermann Eberhard Friedrich Richter (1808–1876), German doctor, botanist and professor in Dresden	Asteraceae	Bu
Richteria	Alexander Vilgelmovich Richter (1804–1849), director of the Moscow University Library in Russia	Asteraceae	Bu
Ricotia	Paul Rycaut (1628–1700), diplomat	Brassicaceae	Bu
Ridleyandra	Henry Nicholas Ridley (1855–1956)	Gesneriaceae	Bu
Ridleyella	Henry Nicholas Ridley (1855–1956)	Orchidaceae	Bu
Ridolfia	Cosimo Ridolfi (1794–1865), Italian nobleman, politician and agronomist	Apiaceae	Bu
Ridsdalea	Colin Ernest Ridsdale (1944–2017), English botanist, Specialist in tropical plants and Rubiaceae family	Rubiaceae	Bt
Riedelia	Johann Gerard Friedrich Riedel (1832–1911); served with the Dutch East India Company and collected plants	Zingiberaceae	Bu
Riedeliella	Ludwig Riedel (1790–1861)	Fabaceae	Bu
Riencourtia	Cathérine Elisabeth Agathe Cassini, born de Riencourt (1783–1861), wife of Henri Cassini	Asteraceae	Bu
Rindera	Franz Andreas Rinder (1714–1772), German-born Russian doctor in Orenburg and Moscow who discovered this plant in the Ural Mountains	Boraginaceae	Bu
Rinzia	Sebastian Rinz (1782–1861) and his son Jacob Rinz (1809–1860), both German gardeners in the city of Frankfurt	Myrtaceae	Qu
Riocreuxia	Alfred Riocreux (1820–1912)	Apocynaceae	Bu
Riqueuria	Ludovico Riqueur (d. 1737), court apothecary during the time of Philip V of Spain; cultivator of exotic trees	Rubiaceae	Bu
Risleya	Herbert Hope Risley (1851–1911), colonial administrator	Orchidaceae	Bu
Ristantia	Jules Marie Claude de Tristan (1776–1861), French botanist and botanical garden administrator in Orléans	Myrtaceae	Bu
Ritchiea	Joseph Ritchie (c. 1788 – 1819)	Capparaceae	Bu
Rivasgodaya	Salvador Rivas Goday (1905–1981), Spanish botanist and plant geographer, professor of pharmacy in Madrid	Fabaceae	Bu
Rivasmartinezia	Salvador Rivas Martínez (1935–2020), Spanish Biologist, Apothecary, Botanist (Mycology, Lichenology, Pteridology), also mountaineer and Alpinist,	Apiaceae	Bt
Rivea	Auguste Arthur de la Rive (1801–1873)	Convolvulaceae	Bu
Rivina	Augustus Quirinus Rivinus (1652–1723)	Phytolaccaceae	St
Robbrechtia	Elmar Robbrecht (b. 1946), Belgian botanist and mycologist at the national botanic gardens; specialist in Rubiaceae	Rubiaceae	Bu
Robinia	Jean Robin (1550–1629)	Fabaceae	Co
Robinsonecio	Harold E. Robinson (1932–2020)	Asteraceae	Bu
Robinsonella	Benjamin Lincoln Robinson (1864–1935)	Malvaceae	Bu
Robiquetia	Pierre Jean Robiquet (1780–1840)	Orchidaceae	Bu
Robsonodendron	Norman K. B. Robson (1928–2021)	Celastraceae	Bu
Robynsia	Frans Hubert Edouard Arthur Walter Robyns (1901–1986)	Rubiaceae	Bu
Robynsiophyton	Frans Hubert Edouard Arthur Walter Robyns (1901–1986)	Fabaceae	Bu
Rochefortia	Charles de Rochefort (1605–1683), French clergyman who explored the Antilles	Boraginaceae	Bu
Rochelia	Anton Rochel (1770–1847)	Boraginaceae	Bu
Rochonia	Alexis-Marie de Rochon (1741–1817), physicist	Asteraceae	Bu
Rockia	Joseph Rock (1884–1962)	Nyctaginaceae	Bu
Rodgersia	John Rodgers (1812–1882), admiral	Saxifragaceae	Co
Rodriguezia	Manuel or Emmanuel Rodríguez (18th century) (Note: Stearn lists Manuel Rodríguez (18th century). Quattrocchi lists three possibilities: Manuel Antonio Rodríguez de Vera (1780–1846), José Demetrio Rodríguez (1780–1847), or Manuel Rodríguez (no dates).)	Orchidaceae	St
Roella	Wilhelm Roell (1700–1775), Dutch horticulturist and professor of anatomy	Campanulaceae	Qu
Roepera	Johannes August Christian Roeper (1801–1885), German doctor and professor of botany in Basel and Rostock	Zygophyllaceae	Qu
Roeperocharis	Johannes August Christian Roeper (1801–1885), German doctor and professor of botany in Basel and Rostock	Orchidaceae	Qu
Rogeria	Jacques-François Roger (1787–1849), French lawyer, colonial administrator, plant collector	Pedaliaceae	Bu
Rogersonanthus	Clark Thomas Rogerson (1918–2001)	Gentianaceae	Bu
Rogiera	Charles Rogier (1800–1885), statesman	Rubiaceae	Bu
Rohdea	Michael Rohde (1782–1812)	Asparagaceae	Co
Roifia	Adriano Fiori (1865–1950)	Malvaceae	Bu
Roigella	Juan Tomás Roig (1877–1971), Cuban teacher and botanist in Havana	Rubiaceae	Bu
Rojasia	Teodoro Rojas (1877–1954)	Apocynaceae	Bu
Rojasianthe	Ulises Rojas Bendfeldt (1881–1959), professor of botany and botanical garden director in Guatemala	Asteraceae	Bu
Rojasimalva	Carmen Emilia Benítez de Rojas (b. 1937), Venezuelan botanist, university professor; specialist in Solanaceae	Malvaceae	Bu
Rokautskyia	Roberto Anselmo Kautsky (1924–2010), Brazilian botanist	Bromeliaceae	Bt
Rolandra	Daniel Rolander (1725–1793)	Asteraceae	Bu
Roldana	Eugenio Montaña y Roldán (1778–1813), Otumban fighter in Mexico's war of independence	Asteraceae	Bu
Romanoa	Girolamo Romano (1765–1841), Italian clergyman and botanist from Padua	Euphorbiaceae	Bu
Romanschulzia	Roman Schulz (1873–1926), German botanist and teacher in Berlin	Brassicaceae	Bu
Romanzoffia	Nikolay Rumyantsev (1754–1826), diplomat	Hydrophyllaceae	Qu
Romeroa	Rafael Romero-Castañeda (1910–1973), Colombian botanist	Bignoniaceae	Bu
Romneya	Thomas Romney Robinson (1792–1882), astronomer	Papaveraceae	Co
Rondeletia	Guillaume Rondelet (1507–1566)	Rubiaceae	St
Rondonanthus	Cândido Rondon (1865–1958), military officer	Eriocaulaceae	Bu
Ronnbergia	Auguste Ronnberg (1813–1888), Belgian director of agriculture	Bromeliaceae	Bu
Roscheria	Albrecht Roscher (1836–1860)	Arecaceae	Bu
Roscoea	William Roscoe (1753–1831)	Zingiberaceae	Co
Rosenbergiodendron	Gustaf Otto Rosenberg (1872–1948)	Rubiaceae	Bu
Roseodendron	Joseph Nelson Rose (1862–1928)	Bignoniaceae	Bu
Rosselia	Elisabeth Paul Eduard de Rossel (1765–1829), French astronomer and Master-at-arms	Burseraceae	Bt
Rossioglossum	John Ross (fl. 1830–1840), collector of orchids in Oaxaca, Mexico	Orchidaceae	Qu
Rostkovia	Friedrich Wilhelm Gottlieb Rostkovius (1770–1848)	Juncaceae	Bu
Rothia	Albrecht Wilhelm Roth (1757–1834)	Fabaceae	Bu
Rothmaleria	Werner Rothmaler (1908–1962)	Asteraceae	Qu
Rothmannia	Göran Rothman (1739–1778)	Rubiaceae	Ba
Rottboellia	Christen Friis Rottbøll (1727–1797)	Poaceae	Bu
Roucheria	Jean-Antoine Roucher (1745–1794), poet	Linaceae	Qu
Roussea	Jean-Jacques Rousseau (1712–1778), Enlightenment philosopher	Rousseaceae	Bu
Rousseauxia	Louis Auguste Joseph Desrousseaux (1753–1838)	Melastomataceae	Bu
Rousselia	perhaps Henri François Anne de Roussel (1748–1812) or Alexandre Victor Roussel (1795–1874), French military apothecary and botanist	Urticaceae	Bu
Rovaeanthus	Johan H. E. Rova (fl. 1990–2002), Swedish botanist at the University of Gothenburg	Rubiaceae	Bu
Roycea	Robert Royce (1914–2008)	Amaranthaceae	Bu
Roylea	John Forbes Royle (1799–1858)	Lamiaceae	Bu
Roystonea	Roy Stone (1836–1905), military officer and engineer	Arecaceae	St
Rudbeckia	Olaus Rudbeck (1630–1702) and his son Olof Rudbeck the Younger (1660–1740)	Asteraceae	Co
Rudgea	Edward Rudge (1763–1846)	Rubiaceae	Bu
Ruehssia	Carl Andreas Rühsz (1805–1880), German consul in Puerto Cabello, Venezuela; supporter of art and science	Apocynaceae	Bu
Ruellia	Jean Ruel (1474–1537)	Acanthaceae	St
Ruelliopsis	Jean Ruel (1474–1537)	Acanthaceae	Bu
Rugelia	Ferdinand Ignatius Xavier Rugel (1806–1879), German-born American apothecary, doctor and botanist	Asteraceae	Bu
Rugoloa	Sulma (Zulma) E. Rúgolo de Agrasar (b.1940), who was an Argentinian botanist, Curator and Professor at the National University of La Pampa	Poaceae	Bt
Ruhooglandia	Ruurd Dirk Hoogland (1922–1994)	Poaceae	Bt
Ruilopezia	Luis Enrique Ruíz-Terán (1923–1979) and Manuel López-Figueiras (1915–2012), Venezuelan botanists and plant collectors	Asteraceae	Bu
Ruizia	Hipólito Ruiz López (1754–1815)	Malvaceae	Bu
Ruizodendron	Hipólito Ruiz López (1754–1815)	Annonaceae	Bu
Ruizterania	Luis Enrique Ruíz-Terán (1923–1979), Venezuelan researcher and university professor of botany	Vochysiaceae	Bu
Rumfordia	Benjamin Thompson (1753–1814), physicist and inventor	Asteraceae	Bu
Rungia	Friedlieb Ferdinand Runge (1794–1867)	Acanthaceae	Bu
Rupertia	Rupert Charles Barneby (1911–2000)	Fabaceae	Bu
Ruppia	Heinrich Bernhard Ruppius (1688–1719)	Ruppiaceae	Qu
Ruprechtia	Franz Josef Ruprecht (1814–1870)	Polygonaceae	Qu
Rusbya	Henry Hurd Rusby (1855–1940)	Ericaceae	Bu
Ruschia	Ernst Julius Rusch (1867–1957), South African farmer and collector	Aizoaceae	St
Ruschianthus	Ernst Franz Theodor Rusch (1897–1964), German-Namibian amateur botanist who collected and cultivated succulents	Aizoaceae	Bu
Ruspolia	Eugenio Ruspoli (1866–1893)	Acanthaceae	St
Russelia	Alexander Russell (1715–1768)	Plantaginaceae	Co
Russowia	Edmund Russow (1841–1897)	Asteraceae	Bu
Rustia	Johann Nepomuk Rust (1775–1840), doctor	Rubiaceae	Bu
Rutheopsis	Johann Friedrich Ruthe (1788–1859)	Apiaceae	Bu
Ruthiella	Ruth van Crevel (b. 1926), Dutch botanical photographer and illustrator	Campanulaceae	Bu
Ruttya	John Rutty (1697–1775)	Acanthaceae	St
Ruyschia	Frederik Ruysch (1638–1731)	Marcgraviaceae	Bu
Ryania	John Ryan (d. c. 1804), English doctor who collected plants from Brazil to the Caribbean	Salicaceae	Bu
Rydingia	Per Olof Ryding (b.1951), Swedish botanist and plant collector in Africa	Lamiaceae	Bt
Rzedowskia	Jerzy Rzedowski (b. 1926)	Celastraceae	Bu
Sabatia	Liberato Sabbati (b. 1714), Italian botanist	Gentianaceae	St
Sabinaria	Sabina Bernal Galeano (b.1995), daughter of the botanical authors, Gloria Galeano and Rodrigo Bernal	Arecaceae	Bt
Sachsia	Julius von Sachs (1832–1897)	Asteraceae	Bu
Sacleuxia	Charles Sacleux (1856–1943)	Apocynaceae	Bu
Sageretia	Augustin Sageret (1763–1851)	Rhamnaceae	Ba
Sagotia	Paul Antoine Sagot (1821–1888), French naval doctor, botanist and plant collector; also worked for the National Museum of Natural History	Euphorbiaceae	Bu
Sagraea	Ramón de la Sagra (1798–1871)	Melastomataceae	Bu
Saintpauliopsis	Walter Le Tanneux de Saint Paul-Illaire (1860–1940), German imperial precinct captain in German East Africa (roughly present-day Tanzania), and his father, Ulrich Maximilian von Saint Paul-Illaire (1833–1902), German naval officer and court official	Acanthaceae	Qu
Salmea	Joseph zu Salm-Reifferscheidt-Dyck (1773–1861)	Asteraceae	Qu
Salmonopuntia	Joseph zu Salm-Reifferscheidt-Dyck (1773–1861)	Cactaceae	Bt
Salomonia	Solomon (1033 BC – 975 BC), king	Polygalaceae	Bu
Saltia	Henry Salt (1780–1827), artist and traveller	Amaranthaceae	Bu
Saltugilia	Filippo Luigi Gilii (1756–1821), Italian clergyman, naturalist and astronomer from the Vatican City	Polemoniaceae	Bt
Salvadora	Jaime Salvador y Pedrol (1649–1740), Spanish apothecary in Barcelona; collected plants in Catalonia	Salvadoraceae	Bu
Salvadoropsis	Jaime Salvador y Pedrol (1649–1740), Spanish apothecary in Barcelona; collected plants in Catalonia	Celastraceae	Bu
Salvertia	Augustin Amable Dutour de Salvert or Du Tour de Salvert Bellenave (1781–1838), French botanist and writer, brother-in-law of the author of the genus, Augustin Saint-Hilaire	Vochysiaceae	Bu
Salzmannia	Philipp Salzmann (1781–1851), German doctor, botanist and entomologist	Rubiaceae	Bu
Samuelssonia	Gunnar Samuelsson (1885–1944), Swedish botanist from the Uppsala University	Acanthaceae	Bt
Sanchezia	José Sánchez (d. c. 1794), Spanish professor of botany	Acanthaceae	St
Sandbergia	John Herman Sandberg (1848–1917), Swedish-born American doctor, botanist and agronomist	Brassicaceae	Bu
Sandemania	Christopher Albert Walter Sandeman (1882–1951), English botanist and traveler; collected in South America	Melastomataceae	Bu
Sanderella	Henry Frederick Conrad Sander (1847–1920)	Orchidaceae	Bu
Sandersonia	John Sanderson (1820–1881), Scottish horticulturist	Colchicaceae	Ba
Sandwithia	Noel Yvri Sandwith (1901–1965), English botanist at Kew Gardens	Euphorbiaceae	Qu
Sanjappa	Munivenkatappa Sanjappa (b. 1951), Indian botanist	Fabaceae	Bt
Sankowskya	Garry Sankowsky (fl. 1960–2003), Australian photographer and plant collector	Picrodendraceae	Bu
Sannantha	Sanna Wilson, wife of the Australian botanist Peter Gordon Wilson (b. 1950), the author of the genus	Myrtaceae	Bu
Santiria	Bapa Santir, Sundanese man from Java who led a botanical exploration of Mount Salak	Burseraceae	Qu
Santisukia	Thawatchai Santisuk (b. 1944), Thai herbarium director in Bangkok	Bignoniaceae	Bu
Santosia	Talmón Soares dos Santos (1935–2012), Brazilian biologist and collector in Itabuna	Asteraceae	Bu
Sanvitalia	Conte Stefano Sanvitale (1764–1838) and/or Federico Sanvitale (1770–1819)	Asteraceae	St
Saposhnikovia	Vasili Vasilievich Saposhnikow (1861–1924), Russian geographer and professor of botany in Tomsk	Apiaceae	Bu
Sapphoa	Sappho (c. 630 BC – c. 570 BC), poet	Acanthaceae	Bu
Saracha	Isidoro Saracha (1733–1803), Spanish monk, apothecary and botanist at the Abbey of Santo Domingo de Silos	Solanaceae	Bu
Sargentodoxa	Charles Sprague Sargent (1841–1927)	Lardizabalaceae	St
Sarmienta	Martín Sarmiento (1695–1772)	Gesneriaceae	Ba
Sarracenia	Michel Sarrazin (1659–1736)	Sarraceniaceae	Ch
Sartwellia	Henry Parker Sartwell (1792–1867)	Asteraceae	Bu
Satakentia	Toshihiko Satake (1910–1998), Japanese factory owner, producer of rice-processing equipment; also an expert in Arecaceae	Arecaceae	Bu
Saundersia (synonym of Trichocentrum)	William Wilson Saunders (1809–1879)	Orchidaceae	Bu
Saurauia	Franz Josef Graf von Saurau (1760–1832), Austrian nobleman and politician; ambassador in Madrid and Florence	Actinidia	Bu
Saussurea	Horace Bénédict de Saussure (1740–1799) and his son Nicolas Théodore de Saussure (1767–1845)	Asteraceae	St
Sauvagesia	François Boissier de Sauvages de Lacroix (1706–1767)	Ochnaceae	Bu
Sauvallea	Francisco Adolfo Sauvalle (1807–1879), Cuban botanist and expert in molluscs	Commelinaceae	Bu
Savia	Gaetano Savi (1769–1844)	Phyllanthaceae	Bu
Savignya	Marie Jules César Savigny (1777–1851)	Brassicaceae	Bu
Saxegothaea	Albert, Prince Consort (1819–1861)	Podocarpaceae	Co
Saxofridericia	Frederick Augustus II of Saxony (1797–1854)	Rapateaceae	Bu
Scabrethia	Nathaniel Jarvis Wyeth (1802–1856), businessman and explorer	Asteraceae	Bu
Scagea	Herbert Kenneth Airy Shaw (1902–1985)	Picrodendraceae	Bu
Scalesia	William Alexander Stables (1810–1890)	Asteraceae	Bu
Scaligeria	Julius Caesar Scaliger (1484–1558)	Apiaceae	Bu
Schaefferia	Jacob Christian Schäffer (1718–1790)	Celastraceae	Bu
Schaueria	Johannes Conrad Schauer (1813–1848) and his brother Sebastian Schauer (1814–1850), German botanist at botanical gardens in present-day Wrocław and Berlin	Acanthaceae	St
Schefferomitra	Rudolph Scheffer (1844–1880)	Annonaceae	Qu
Schefflera	Johann Peter Ernst von Scheffler (b. 1739), Polish physician	Araliaceae	Co
Schefflerodendron	Georg Richard Otto Scheffler (c. 1875 – 1911), German gardener and botanist at the botanical garden in Dahlem, Berlin	Fabaceae	Bu
Schelhammera	Günther Christoph Schelhammer (1649–1716), German doctor and professor of botany at the universities in Helmstedt, Jena and Kiel	Colchicaceae	Bu
Schenckochloa	Heinrich Schenck (1860–1927)	Poaceae	Bu
Schenkia	August Schenk (1815–1891)	Gentianaceae	Bu
Scherya	Robert Walter Schery (1917–1987), American botanist at the Missouri Botanical Garden	Asteraceae	Bu
Scheuchzeria	Johann Gaspar Scheuchzer (1684–1738) and his brother Johann Jacob Scheuchzer (1672–1733)	Scheuchzeriaceae	Bu
Schickendantziella	Friedrich Schickendantz (1837–1896)	Amaryllidaceae	Bu
Schiedea	Christian Julius Wilhelm Schiede (1798–1836)	Caryophyllaceae	Bu
Schiedeella	Christian Julius Wilhelm Schiede (1798–1836)	Orchidaceae	Bu
Schiekia	Friedrich Wilhelm Schieck (1790–1870), German optician and artist	Haemodoraceae	Bu
Schimpera	Georg Wilhelm Schimper (1804–1878)	Brassicaceae	Qu
Schindleria	Anton Karl Schindler (1879–1964)	Petiveriaceae	Bu
Schinziella	Hans Schinz (1858–1941)	Gentianaceae	Qu
Schinziophyton	Hans Schinz (1858–1941)	Euphorbiaceae	Qu
Schippia	William A. Schipp (1891–1967)	Arecaceae	Qu
Schischkinia	Boris Schischkin (1886–1963)	Asteraceae	Bu
Schivereckia	Swibert Burkhart Schivereck (1742–1806), Austrian botanist	Brassicaceae	St
Schkuhria	Christian Schkuhr (1741–1811)	Asteraceae	Bu
Schlagintweitia	Adolf Schlagintweit (1829–1857) and his brothers Hermann (1826–1882) and Robert (1833–1885)	Asteraceae	Bu
Schlechtendalia	Diederich Friedrich Karl von Schlechtendal (1767–1842), German lawyer and botanist in Berlin, Minden und Paderborn; father of the botanist Diederich Franz Leonhard von Schlechtendal	Asteraceae	Bu
Schlechteranthus	Max Schlechter (1874–1960), brother and colleague of Rudolf Schlechter	Aizoaceae	Bu
Schlechterella	Rudolf Schlechter (1872–1925)	Apocynaceae	Qu
Schlechterina	Rudolf Schlechter (1872–1925)	Passifloraceae	Qu
Schlegelia	Hermann Schlegel (1804–1884)	Schlegeliaceae	Bu
Schleichera	Johann Christoph Schleicher (1768–1834), German-Swiss apothecary and botanist in Bex	Sapindaceae	Bu
Schleinitzia	Georg von Schleinitz (1834–1910), German vice-admiral and colonial administrator	Fabaceae	Bu
Schlimia	Louis Joseph Schlim (1819–1863), Belgian plant collector in South and Central America	Orchidaceae	Bu
Schlumbergera	Frédéric Emile Schlumberger (1823–1893), cactus collector	Cactaceae	Co
Schmardaea	Ludwig Karl Schmarda (1819–1908)	Meliaceae	Bu
Schmidtia	Franz Wilibald Schmidt (1764–1796), Bohemian doctor, zoologist and professor of botany; also a botanical painter	Poaceae	Bu
Schmidtottia	Friedrich Schmidt-Ott (1860–1956), lawyer, politician, Prussian official	Rubiaceae	Bu
Schnabelia	Rudolf Schnabel (20th century), merchant in Changsha, China, who assisted Heinrich von Handel-Mazzetti	Lamiaceae	Bu
Schnella	Jakob Rudolf Schnell (1778–1856), Swiss industrialist, banker and philanthropist	Fabaceae	Bu
Schoenefeldia	Wladimir de Schoenefeld (1816–1875)	Poaceae	Bu
Schoenia	Johann or Johannes Matthias Albrecht Schoen (1800–1870), German eye doctor, botanist and illustrator	Asteraceae	Bu
Schoepfia	Johann David Schoepff (1752–1800)	Schoepfiaceae	Bu
Scholtzia	Johann Eduard Heinrich Scholtz (1812–1859), German doctor, botanist and entomologist in present-day Wrocław	Myrtaceae	Bu
Schomburgkia	Robert Hermann Schomburgk (1804–1865)	Orchidaceae	St
Schotia	Richard van der Schot (d. 1819), gardener at Schönbrunn Palace in Vienna	Fabaceae	St
Schottariella	Heinrich Wilhelm Schott (1794–1865)	Araceae	Bu
Schottarum	Heinrich Wilhelm Schott (1794–1865)	Araceae	Bu
Schoutenia	Willem Schouten (c. 1580 – 1625), navigator	Malvaceae	Bu
Schouwia	Joakim Frederik Schouw (1789–1852)	Brassicaceae	Bu
Schradera	Heinrich Schrader (1767–1836)	Rubiaceae	Bu
Schrebera	Johann Christian Daniel von Schreber (1739–1810)	Oleaceae	Bu
Schreiteria	Carlos Rodolfo Schreiter (1877–1942), German-Argentinian botanist, student of Miguel Lillo	Montiaceae	Bu
Schrenkia	Alexander von Schrenk (1816–1876)	Apiaceae	Bu
Schtschurowskia	Gregory Ephimovich Shchurovsky (1803–1884)	Apiaceae	Bu
Schubertia	Gotthilf Heinrich von Schubert (1780–1860)	Apocynaceae	St
Schuitemania	André Schuiteman (b. 1960)	Orchidaceae	Bu
Schultesia	Josef August Schultes (1773–1831)	Gentianaceae	Bu
Schultesianthus	Richard Evans Schultes (1915–2001)	Solanaceae	Bu
Schultesiophytum	Richard Evans Schultes (1915–2001)	Cyclanthaceae	Bu
Schulzia	Karl Friedrich Schultz (1766–1837), German doctor and botanist, and Johann Heinrich Schulze (1687–1744)	Apiaceae	Bu
Schumacheria	Heinrich Christian Friedrich Schumacher (1757–1830)	Dilleniaceae	Bu
Schumannianthus	Karl Moritz Schumann (1851–1904)	Marantaceae	Bu
Schumanniophyton	Karl Moritz Schumann (1851–1904)	Rubiaceae	Bu
Schunkea	Vital Schunk (fl. 1990–1999), co-collector of this plant in southeast Brazil	Orchidaceae	Bu
Schuurmansia	Jacobus Hermanus Schuurmans Stekhoven (1792–1855), Dutch botanical garden curator in Leiden	Ochnaceae	Qu
Schuurmansiella	Jacobus Hermanus Schuurmans Stekhoven (1792–1855), Dutch botanical garden curator in Leiden	Ochnaceae	Qu
Schwackaea	Carl August Wilhelm Schwacke (1848–1904)	Melastomataceae	Bu
Schwalbea	Georg Christian Schwalbe (1691–1761), Dutch doctor and botanist	Orobanchaceae	Bu
Schwantesia	Martin Heinrich Gustav Schwantes (1891–1960)	Aizoaceae	Bu
Schwartzia	Olof Swartz (1760–1818)	Marcgraviaceae	Bu
Schweiggeria	August Friedrich Schweigger (1783–1821)	Violaceae	Bu
Schweinfurthia	Georg August Schweinfurth (1836–1925)	Plantaginaceae	Bu
Schwenckia	Martinus Wilhelmus Schwencke (1707–1785), Dutch doctor and botanist in The Hague with a medicine garden	Solanaceae	Bu
Schwendenera	Simon Schwendener (1829–1919)	Rubiaceae	Bu
Scopolia	Giovanni Antonio Scopoli (1723–1788)	Solanaceae	Co
Scottellia	George Francis Scott Elliot (1862–1934)	Achariaceae	Bu
Searsia	Paul Sears (1891–1990)	Anacardiaceae	Bu
Sebaea	Albertus Seba (1665–1736)	Gentianaceae	Bu
Sebastiania	Francesco Antonio Sebastiani (1782–1821), Italian doctor, professor of botany and university botanical garden director in Rome	Euphorbiaceae	Bu
Sebastiano-schaueria	Sebastian Schauer (1814–1850), German gardener and botanist at botanical gardens in present-day Wrocław and Berlin	Acanthaceae	Bu
Secondatia	Jean-Baptiste de Secondat (1716–1796)	Apocynaceae	Bu
Seegeriella	Hans Gerhard Seeger (b. 1939), German gardener at botanical gardens in Göttingen, Hanover and Heidelberg	Orchidaceae	Bu
Seemannaralia	Berthold Carl Seemann (1825–1871)	Araliaceae	Bu
Seemannia	Berthold Carl Seemann (1825–1871)	Gesneriaceae	Bu
Seetzenia	Ulrich Jasper Seetzen (1767–1811)	Zygophyllaceae	Bu
Seguieria	Jean-François Séguier (1703–1784)	Petiveriaceae	Bu
Seidelia	perhaps Carl Friedrich Seidel (d. 1898), German painter and botanist, and/or Jacob Friedrich Seidel (1789–1860), German gardener, and/or Johann Heinrich Seidel (1744–1815), German court gardener, and/or Traugott Leberecht Seidel (1775–1815), German gardener	Euphorbiaceae	Bu
Seidenfadenia	Gunnar Seidenfaden (1908–2001)	Orchidaceae	Bu
Seidlitzia	Nikolai Karl Samuel von Seidlitz (1831–1907), Baltic German botanist and statistician	Amaranthaceae	Bu
Selkirkia	Alexander Selkirk (1676–1721), sailor and castaway	Boraginaceae	Bu
Selliera	François Noël Sellier (1737–1809), French botanical illustrator	Goodeniaceae	St
Selloa	Friedrich Sellow (1789–1831)	Asteraceae	Qu
Sellocharis	Friedrich Sellow (1789–1831)	Fabaceae	Qu
Selysia	Edmond de Sélys Longchamps (1813–1900)	Cucurbitaceae	Bu
Semenovia	Pyotr Semyonov-Tyan-Shansky (1827–1914)	Apiaceae	Bu
Semiria	João Semir (b. 1937), Brazilian botanist, specialist in Asteraceae	Asteraceae	Bu
Senaea	Joaquim Candido da Costa Sena (1852–1919), Brazilian geologist and plant collector	Gentianaceae	Bu
Senefeldera	Alois Senefelder (1771–1834), lithographer	Euphorbiaceae	Bu
Senefelderopsis	Alois Senefelder (1771–1834), lithographer	Euphorbiaceae	Bu
Senra	Buenaventura Serra y Ferragut (1728–1784), Spanish lawyer and professor at the university in Mallorca; a member of the royal academy of history and a cofounder of the Mallorcan branch of the Sociedad Económica de los Amigos del País	Malvaceae	Bu
Sequoia	Sequoyah (c. 1770 – 1843), Cherokee linguist (disputed; implausible)	Cupressaceae	Co
Sequoiadendron	Sequoyah (c. 1770 – 1843), Cherokee linguist (disputed; implausible)	Cupressaceae	Co
Serenoa	Sereno Watson (1826–1892)	Arecaceae	St
Sergia	Serguéi Vassílievich Juzepczuk or Sergueï Vassilievitch Yuzepchúk (1893–1959), Russian botanist at the university botanical garden in Saint Petersburg, specialist in Solanaceae	Campanulaceae	Bu
Seringia	Nicolas Charles Seringe (1776–1858)	Malvaceae	Bu
Serjania	Philippe Sergeant (17th century), French monk and botanist	Sapindaceae	St
Serruria	Joseph Serrurier (1663–1742), Dutch doctor and natural scientist; professor first in philosophy and mathematics, then in medicine and botany at the university in Utrecht	Proteaceae	Bu
Sersalisia	Gerolamo Sersale (1584–1654), astronomer	Sapotaceae	Bu
Sesleria	Leonard Sesler (d. 1785), German-Italian doctor and botanist who maintained a large botanical garden	Poaceae	Co
Sesleriella	Leonard Sesler (d. 1785), German-Italian doctor and botanist who maintained a large botanical garden	Poaceae	Bu
Sessea	Martín Sessé y Lacasta (1751–1808)	Solanaceae	Bu
Setchellanthus	William Albert Setchell (1864–1943)	Setchellanthaceae	Bu
Severinia	Marco Aurelio Severino (1580–1656), anatomist	Rutaceae	St
Sextonia	André Joseph Guillaume Henri Kostermans (1906–1994)	Lauraceae	Bu
Seymeria	Henry Seymer (1745–1800), English amateur botanist	Orobanchaceae	Bu
Seymeriopsis	Henry Seymer (1745–1800), English amateur botanist	Orobanchaceae	Bu
Seyrigia	André Seyrig (1897–1945), French amateur entomologist and botanist from Alsace; mining director in the Bekily District of Madagascar	Cucurbitaceae	Bu
Shafera	John Adolph Shafer (1863–1918)	Asteraceae	Bu
Shaferocharis	John Adolph Shafer (1863–1918)	Rubiaceae	Bu
Shangwua	Shang Wu Liu (b. 1934), Chinese botanist, taxonomist and professor in the province of Qinghai, China	Asteraceae	Bu
Sheareria	George Campbell Shearer (1836–1892), Scottish doctor; taught botany at the school of medicine in Liverpool	Asteraceae	Bu
Sheilanthera	Sheila Williams, wife and colleague of Ion James Muirhead Williams (1912–2001), South African botanist and author of the genus	Rutaceae	Bu
Shepherdia	John Shepherd (1765–1836), English botanist	Elaeagnaceae	Co
Sherardia	William Sherard (c. 1658 – 1728)	Rubiaceae	Bu
Sherbournia	Margaret Dorothea Sherbourne, born Willis (1791–1846), English plant collector	Rubiaceae	Bu
Shibataea	Keita Shibata (1878–1949)	Poaceae	Co
Shinnersia	Lloyd Herbert Shinners (1918–1971)	Asteraceae	Qu
Shinnersoseris	Lloyd Herbert Shinners (1918–1971)	Asteraceae	Qu
Shiuyinghua	Shiu-Ying Hu (1910–2012)	Paulowniaceae	Bu
Shonia	Enid Lynette Henderson (d. 1991), wife of Rodney John Francis Henderson, the author of the genus	Euphorbiaceae	Bu
Shorea	John Shore, 1st Baron Teignmouth (1751–1834)	Dipterocarpaceae	Bu
Shortia	Charles Wilkins Short (1794–1863)	Diapensiaceae	St
Shuteria	James Shuter (1795–1826), English doctor and botanist; collected plants in present-day Chennai, India	Fabaceae	Bu
Sibbaldia	Robert Sibbald (1641–1722)	Rosaceae	St
Sibbaldianthe	Robert Sibbald (1641–1722)	Rosaceae	Bu
Sibthorpia	Humphry Sibthorp (1713–1797)	Plantaginaceae	St
Sidneya	Sidney Fay Blake (1892–1959)	Asteraceae	Bu
Siebera	Franz Sieber (1789–1844)	Asteraceae	Bu
Siemensia	Werner von Siemens (1816–1892), inventor and industrialist	Rubiaceae	Bu
Sievekingia	Friedrich Sieveking (1798–1872), German lawyer and politician in Hamburg	Orchidaceae	Bu
Sieversandreas	Andreas Sievers (1931–2009), German botanist, director of the university botanical garden in Bonn, professor of cell biology	Orobanchaceae	Bu
Sieversia	Johann August Carl Sievers (1762–1795)	Rosaceae	Bu
Sigesbeckia	Johann Georg Siegesbeck (1686–1755), botanist and critic of Carl Linnaeus	Asteraceae	St
Silvianthus	Francis De Silva, collector for Nathaniel Wallich	Carlemanniaceae	Bu
Silviella	Baltasar da Silva Lisboa (1761–1840), Brazilian lawyer and natural historian	Orobanchaceae	Bu
Simmondsia	Thomas William Simmonds (1767–1804), English doctor and naturalist	Simmondsiaceae	Ba
Simsia	John Sims (1749–1831)	Asteraceae	Bu
Sinclairia	Andrew Sinclair (1794–1861)	Asteraceae	Bu
Sinningia	Wilhelm Werner Carl Sinning (1791–1874), German horticulturist	Gesneriaceae	Co
Sinochasea	Mary Agnes Chase (1869–1963)	Poaceae	Bu
Sinodielsia	Ludwig Diels (1874–1945)	Apiaceae	Bu
Sinofranchetia	Adrien René Franchet (1834–1900)	Lardizabalaceae	Bu
Sinojackia	John George Jack (1861–1949)	Styracaceae	Ba
Sinojohnstonia	Ivan Murray Johnston (1898–1960)	Boraginaceae	Bu
Sinolimprichtia	Hans Wolfgang Limpricht (b. 1877), German botanist; collected plants in China and Japan	Apiaceae	Bu
Sinowilsonia	Ernest Henry Wilson (1876–1930)	Hamamelidaceae	St
Siraitia	Harley Harris Bartlett (1886–1960)	Cucurbitaceae	Bu
Sirdavidia	David Frederick Attenborough (b. 1926)	Annonaceae	Bt
Sirhookera	Joseph Dalton Hooker (1817–1911)	Orchidaceae	Bu
Sirindhornia	Sirindhorn (b. 1955), princess	Orchidaceae	Bu
Sladenia	Edward Bosc Sladen (1827–1890), army officer	Sladeniaceae	Bu
Sleumerodendron	Hermann Otto Sleumer (1906–1993)	Proteaceae	Bu
Sloanea	Hans Sloane (1660–1753)	Elaeocarpaceae	Bu
Smallanthus	John Kunkel Small (1869–1938)	Asteraceae	Bu
Smelowskia	Timotheus Smelowsky (1769–1815), Russian apothecary and botanist, professor of chemistry and medicine in Saint Petersburg	Brassicaceae	Bu
Smirnowia	Sergej Smirnoff, student who accompanied Alexander von Middendorff to Kokand in present-day Uzbekistan and collected plants on the southeast coast of the Aral Sea	Fabaceae	Bu
Smithia	James Edward Smith (1759–1828)	Fabaceae	Bu
Smithiantha	Matilda Smith (1854–1926)	Gesneriaceae	St
Smithsonia	James Smithson (c. 1765 – 1829)	Orchidaceae	Bu
Smitinandia	Tem Smitinand (1920–1995), director of the Royal Thailand Department of Forestry; orchid taxonomist	Orchidaceae	Bu
Smythea	William James Smythe (1816–1887), military officer	Rhamnaceae	Bu
Snowdenia	Joseph Devenport Snowden (1886–1973), British gardener, botanist and mycologist; worked at Kew Gardens	Poaceae	Qu
Soaresia	Sebastião or Sebastián Ferreira Soares (1820–1887), Brazilian administrator; wrote about agricultural finances and statistics	Asteraceae	Bu
Sobennikoffia	Alexandra Vasilewna Schlechter, born Sobennikoff, wife of the author of the genus, Rudolf Schlechter	Orchidaceae	Bu
Sobolewskia	Gregor Federovitch Sobolewsky or Gregoriy Federowich Sobolewski (1741–1807), Russian military doctor, botanist and mycologist; botanical garden director in Saint Petersburg and professor of botany	Brassicaceae	Bu
Sobralia	Francisco Martinez Sobral (d. 1799), Spanish physician	Orchidaceae	St
Socratea	Socrates (469–399 BC), philosopher	Arecaceae	Bu
Soehrensia	Johannes Soehrens (d.1934) Dutch botanist and Professor and Director of the Botanical Garden in Santiago de Chile	Cactaceae	Bt
Soejatmia	Soejatmi Dransfield (b. 1939)	Poaceae	Bu
Soemmeringia	Samuel Thomas von Sömmerring (1755–1830), anatomist	Fabaceae	Bu
Sohmaea	Kankichi Sohma (1755–1830), Japanese botanist who worked at Tohoku University, Japan	Fabaceae	Bt
Sohnreyia	Heinrich Sohnrey (1859–1948), German teacher and writer	Rutaceae	Bu
Sohnsia	Ernest Reeves Sohns (1917–2001), American botanist at the National Museum of Natural History	Poaceae	Bu
Solandra	Daniel Solander (1733–1782)	Solanaceae	St
Soleirolia	Henri-Augustin Soleirol, French military engineer and botanist in Corsica (1792–1860)	Urticaceae	Co
Soliva	Salvador Soliva (c. 1750 – 1793), Spanish botanist and doctor at the Spanish court in Madrid; professor of botany	Asteraceae	Bu
Solms-laubachia	Hermann zu Solms-Laubach (1842–1915)	Brassicaceae	Qu
Solmsia	Hermann zu Solms-Laubach (1842–1915)	Thymelaeaceae	Qu
Solonia	Solon (c. 640 BC – c. 560 BC), statesman	Primulaceae	Bu
Sommera	Christian Niefeldt Sommer (1821–1878), entomologist; supported the research of author of the genus, Diederich Friedrich Carl von Schlechtendal	Rubiaceae	Bu
Sommerfeltia	Søren Christian Sommerfelt (1794–1838)	Asteraceae	Qu
Sommieria	Carlo Pietro Stefano Sommier (1848–1922), French-born Italian botanist and natural historian who collected across Europe and in the Caucasus	Arecaceae	Bu
Somrania	Somran Suddee (fl. 1998); worked at the Forest Herbarium in Bangkok in Thailand	Gesneriaceae	Bu
Sondottia	Otto Wilhelm Sonder (1812–1881)	Asteraceae	Bu
Sonneratia	Pierre Sonnerat (1749–1814)	Lythraceae	Bu
Sotoa	Miguel Ángel Soto Arenas (1963–2009), Mexican botanist, specialist in Mexican and Central American orchids	Orchidaceae	Bu
Souroubea	James Sowerby (1757–1822)	Marcgraviaceae	Bu
Sowerbaea	James Sowerby (1757–1822)	Asparagaceae	Bt
Soyauxia	Hermann Soyaux (1852–1928), German gardener, botanist and African explorer	Peridiscaceae	Bu
Spachea	Édouard Spach (1801–1879)	Malpighiaceae	Bu
Sparrmannia	Anders Sparrman (1748–1820)	Malvaceae	St
Specklinia	Veit Rudolf Specklin (d. 1550), engraver in Strasbourg (now a French city)	Orchidaceae	Bu
Spegazziniophytum	Carlo Luigi Spegazzini (1858–1926)	Euphorbiaceae	Bu
Spenceria	Spencer Le Marchant Moore (1850–1931)	Rosaceae	St
Speranskia	Mikhail Speransky (1772–1839), statesman	Euphorbiaceae	Bu
Spetaea	Franz Speta (1941–2015)	Asparagaceae	Bu
Spigelia	Adriaan van den Spiegel (1578–1625), anatomist	Loganiaceae	Co
Spragueanella	Thomas Archibald Sprague (1877–1958)	Loranthaceae	Bu
Sprekelia	Johann Heinrich von Sprekelsen (1691–1764), botanist in Hamburg	Amaryllidaceae	St
Sprengelia	Christian Konrad Sprengel (1750–1816)	Ericaceae	Bu
Staavia	Martin Staaf (1731–1788), correspondent with Carl Linnaeus, in Gothenburg	Bruniaceae	Bu
Staberoha	Johann Heinrich Ludwig Staberoh (1785–1857), German apothecary and teacher at a veterinary school; member of the examination board for apothecaries	Restionaceae	Bu
Stackhousia	John Stackhouse (1742–1819)	Celastraceae	Bu
Stadtmannia	Jean Frédéric Stadtmann (1762–1807), French doctor, botanist and draftsman	Sapindaceae	Bu
Staehelina	Benedikt Stähelin (1695–1750), Swiss doctor and natural scientist; professor of physics at the University of Basel	Asteraceae	Bu
Staelia	Auguste Louis de Staël-Holstein (1790–1827), French philanthropist	Rubiaceae	Bu
Stalkya	Galfrid Clement Keyworth Dunsterville (1905–1988), English engineer; specialist in orchids	Orchidaceae	Bu
Standleya	Paul Carpenter Standley (1884–1963)	Rubiaceae	Bu
Standleyanthus	Paul Carpenter Standley (1884–1963)	Asteraceae	Bu
Stanfieldiella	Dennis Percival Stanfield (1903–1971), British botanist and taxonomist in the Nigerian Civil Service	Commelinaceae	Bu
Stangeria	William Stanger (1811–1854)	Zamiaceae	St
Stanhopea	Philip Henry Stanhope, 4th Earl Stanhope (1781–1855)	Orchidaceae	St
Stanleya	Edward Smith-Stanley, 13th Earl of Derby (1775–1851)	Brassicaceae	Bu
Stanmarkia	Paul Carpenter Standley (1884–1963) and Julian Alfred Steyermark (1909–1988)	Melastomataceae	Bu
Stapelia	Johannes Bodaeus van Stapel (c. 1600 – 1636)	Apocynaceae	St
Stapelianthus	Johannes Bodaeus van Stapel (c. 1600 – 1636)	Apocynaceae	Qu
Stapeliopsis	Johannes Bodaeus van Stapel (c. 1600 – 1636)	Apocynaceae	Qu
Stapfiella	Otto Stapf (1857–1933)	Passifloraceae	Bu
Stapfochloa	Otto Stapf (1857–1933)	Poaceae	Bu
Staudtia	Alois Staudt (d. 1897), German botanist; collected plants in Kamerun (now Cameroon)	Myristicaceae	Bu
Staufferia	Hans Ulrich Stauffer (1929–1965), Swiss botanist who traveled in South Africa, Australia and New Guinea; specialist in Santalaceae	Santalaceae	Bu
Stauntonia	George Staunton, 1st Baronet (1737–1801), botanist	Lardizabalaceae	Co
Stawellia	William Stawell (1815–1889), politician and judge	Asphodelaceae	Bu
Stayneria	Frank J. Stayner (1907–1981), South African horticulturist, specialist in succulents; curator at the Karoo botanical garden	Aizoaceae	Bu
Steenisia	Cornelis Gijsbert Gerrit Jan van Steenis (1901–1986)	Rubiaceae	Bu
Stefanoffia	Boris Stefanoff (1894–1979), Bulgarian botanist, curator at the herbarium of Sofia University	Apiaceae	Bu
Steinbachiella	José Steinbach (1856–1929), collector in Bolivia and Argentina	Fabaceae	Bu
Stellera	Georg Wilhelm Steller (1709–1746)	Thymelaeaceae	St
Stephanbeckia	Stephan Georg Beck (b. 1944), botanist from Missouri Botanical Garden	Asteraceae	Bt
Sternbergia	Kaspar Maria von Sternberg (1761–1838)	Amaryllidaceae	Co
Stetsonia	Francis Lynde Stetson (1846–1920), lawyer	Cactaceae	St
Steudnera	Hermann Steudner (1832–1863)	Araceae	Bu
Stevenia	Christian von Steven (1781–1863)	Brassicaceae	Bu
Steveniella	Christian von Steven (1781–1863)	Orchidaceae	Bu
Stevensia	Edward Stevens (1755–1834), doctor and diplomat	Rubiaceae	Bu
Stevia	Pedro Jaime Esteve (c. 1500 – 1556)	Asteraceae	St
Steviopsis	Pedro Jaime Esteve (c. 1500 – 1556)	Asteraceae	Bu
Stewartia	John Stuart, 3rd Earl of Bute (1713–1792), prime minister of Great Britain	Theaceae	Co
Stewartiella	Ralph Randles Stewart (1890–1993)	Apiaceae	Bu
Steyerbromelia	Julian Alfred Steyermark (1909–1988)	Bromeliaceae	Bu
Steyermarkia	Julian Alfred Steyermark (1909–1988)	Rubiaceae	Bu
Steyermarkina	Julian Alfred Steyermark (1909–1988)	Asteraceae	Bu
Steyermarkochloa	Julian Alfred Steyermark (1909–1988)	Poaceae	Bu
Stifftia	Andreas Joseph Freiherr von Stifft (1760–1836), Austrian doctor in Vienna; also an imperial personal physician	Asteraceae	Bu
Stillingia	Benjamin Stillingfleet (1702–1771)	Euphorbiaceae	Bu
Stimpsonia	William Stimpson (1832–1872)	Primulaceae	Bu
Stirlingia	James Stirling (1791–1865), colonial administrator	Proteaceae	Qu
Stirtonanthus	Charles Howard Stirton (b. 1946), South African botanist and taxonomist; later a director at Kew Gardens	Fabaceae	Bu
Stocksia	John Ellerton Stocks (1822–1854)	Sapindaceae	Bu
Stockwellia	Victor Charles Stockwell (1918–1999), Australian forest ranger in Queensland	Myrtaceae	Bu
Stoeberia	Ernst Stoeber (1889–1927?), German teacher and botanist in Lüderitz in present-day Namibia	Aizoaceae	Bu
Stokesia	Jonathan Stokes (1755–1831)	Asteraceae	Co
Stonesia	Margaret Stones (b. 1920)	Podostemaceae	Bu
Stonesiella	Margaret Stones (b. 1920)	Fabaceae	Bu
Storckiella	Jacob Storck (1836–1893), German-born Australian gardener from Darmstadt; accompanied the author of the genus, Berthold Carl Seemann, on a plant-collecting expedition	Fabaceae	Bu
Strangea	Frederick Strange (1826–1854), English-born Australian seaman who operated an export business in Sydney for plant and animal specimens, most collected by him	Proteaceae	Bu
Stranvaesia	William Fox-Strangways, 4th Earl of Ilchester (1795–1865)	Rosaceae	St
Strasburgeria	Eduard Strasburger (1844–1912)	Strasburgeriaceae	Bu
Strelitzia	Charlotte of Mecklenburg-Strelitz (1744–1818)	Strelitziaceae	Ch
Strempeliopsis	Johannes Carl Friedrich Strempel (1800–1872), German eye doctor and natural scientist; later a professor in Rostock	Apocynaceae	Bu
Strotheria	John Lance Strother (b. 1941), American botanist at the university herbarium in Berkeley, California	Asteraceae	Bu
Strumpfia	Christoph Carl Strumpff (d. 1754), German doctor, professor of chemistry in Halle	Rubiaceae	Bu
Stuartina	Charles Stuart (1802–1877), English botanist, gardener and traveler; collected in Australia and New Zealand	Asteraceae	Qu
Stuckenia	Wilhelm Adolf Stucken (1860–1901), German teacher of Latin, Greek and German at a school in Bremen; built up a herbarium and botanical garden	Potamogetonaceae	Bu
Stuhlmannia	Franz Stuhlmann (1863–1928)	Fabaceae	Qu
Stutzia	Howard Stutz (1918–2010)	Amaranthaceae	Bu
Suarezia	Carola Lindberg de Súarez, South American orchid collector and illustrator	Orchidaceae	Bu
Succowia	Georg Adolf Suckow (1751–1813)	Brassicaceae	Bu
Suchtelenia	Paul van Suchtelen (1788–1833), Dutch-born Russian military officer	Boraginaceae	Bu
Suckleya	George Suckley (1830–1869)	Amaranthaceae	Bu
Suessenguthia	Karl Suessenguth (1893–1955)	Acanthaceae	Bu
Suessenguthiella	Karl Suessenguth (1893–1955)	Molluginaceae	Bu
Suksdorfia	Wilhelm Nikolaus Suksdorf (1850–1932)	Saxifragaceae	Bu
Sullivantia	William Starling Sullivant (1803–1873)	Saxifragaceae	Bu
Summerhayesia	V. S. Summerhayes (1897–1974)	Orchidaceae	Bu
Sunhangia	Hang Sun (b.1963), Chinese botanist, Professor of Botany and Director of the Kunming Institute of Botany in Yunnan	Fabaceae	Bt
Suriana	Joseph Donat Surian (1650–1691), French doctor, chemist and botanist	Surianaceae	Bu
Surreya	Surrey Wilfrid Laurance Jacobs (1946–2009), Australian botanist and botanical garden taxonomist in Sydney	Amaranthaceae	Bu
Sutera	Johann Rudolf Suter (1766–1827)	Scrophulariaceae	Bu
Sutherlandia	James Sutherland (1639–1719)	Fabaceae	St
Suzukia	Shigeyoshi Suzuki (1894 – c. 1934), Japanese botanist and plant collector	Lamiaceae	Bu
Svenkoeltzia	Sven Koeltz (b. 1941), German book dealer and publisher of scientific books in Königstein in Taunus	Orchidaceae	Bu
Swainsona	Isaac Swainson (1746–1812)	Fabaceae	Co
Swallenia	Jason Richard Swallen (1903–1991)	Poaceae	Bu
Swartzia	Olof Swartz (1760–1818)	Fabaceae	Bu
Sweetia	Robert Sweet (1783–1835)	Fabaceae	Bu
Swertia	Emanuel Sweert (c. 1552 – 1612)	Gentianaceae	St
Swietenia	Gerard van Swieten (1700–1772), doctor	Meliaceae	St
Swinglea	Walter Tennyson Swingle (1871–1952)	Rutaceae	Bu
Swintonia	George Swinton (1780–1854)	Anacardiaceae	Bu
Symonanthus	David Eric Symon (1920–2011), Australian botanist and taxonomist from the University of Adelaide and Waite Agricultural Research Institute	Solanaceae	Bt
Symmeria	Robert Symmer (1707–1763), physicist	Polygonaceae	Bu
Syreitschikovia	Dmitry Petrovich Syreyshchikov (1868–1932), Russian botanist, curator at the university herbarium in Moscow	Asteraceae	Bu
Szovitsia	Johann Nepomuk Szovits (1782–1830), Hungarian-born Russian apothecary and botanist	Apiaceae	Bu
Tabernaemontana	Jacobus Theodorus Tabernaemontanus (1522–1590)	Apocynaceae	St
Tabernanthe	Jacobus Theodorus Tabernaemontanus (1522–1590)	Apocynaceae	Bu
Takhtajania	Armen Takhtajan (1910–2009)	Winteraceae	Qu
Takhtajaniantha	Armen Takhtajan (1910–2009)	Asteraceae	Qu
Takhtajaniella	Armen Takhtajan (1910–2009)	Brassicaceae	Bu
Talbotiella	Dorothy Amaury Talbot (1871–1916) and her husband Percy Amaury Talbot (1877–1945), African anthropologists, explorers and plant collectors	Fabaceae	Bu
Tamamschjanella	Sofya Georgiyevna Tamamshyan (1901–1981)	Apiaceae	Bu
Tamayorkis	Roberto González Tamayo (1940–2014), Mexican engineer and botanist, professor at the University of Guadalajara	Orchidaceae	Bu
Tamijia	Tamiji Inoue (1947–1997), Japanese botanist and zoologist (entomologist)	Zingiberaceae	Bu
Tammsia	Georg Tamms, German doctor from Altona (near Hamburg), also a collector	Rubiaceae	Bu
Tanakaea	Tanaka Yoshio (1838–1916)	Saxifragaceae	St
Tannodia	Alfred Moquin-Tandon (1804–1863)	Euphorbiaceae	Bu
Taplinia	Theodore Ernest Holmes Aplin (1927–1991), Burmese-Australian botanist at the Western Australian Herbarium; found this plant	Asteraceae	Bu
Tashiroea	Antei Tashiro (1856–1928), Japanese botanist and anthropologist, cofounder of a botanical garden in Taiwan	Melastomataceae	Bu
Tasmannia	Abel Tasman (1603–1659), seafarer and explorer	Winteraceae	Qu
Tateanthus	George Henry Hamilton Tate (1894–1953)	Melastomataceae	Bu
Tateishia	Yoichi Tateishi (b.1948), Japanese botanist and Professor at University of the Ryukyus in Okinawa	Fabaceae	Bt
Tatianyx	Tatiana Skvortzov Sendulsky (1922–2004), Russian-born Brazilian botanist who worked at the botanical institute of the University of São Paulo	Poaceae	Bu
Tauschia	Ignaz Friedrich Tausch (1793–1848)	Apiaceae	Bu
Tavaresia	José Tavares de Macedo (1801-1890), colonial administrator in Portuguese Angola (present-day Angola)	Apocynaceae	Bu
Taverniera	Jean-Baptiste Tavernier (1605–1689), gem merchant and traveler	Fabaceae	Bu
Teagueia	Walter Teague (1925–2013), American botanist in San Francisco, collector of orchids	Orchidaceae	Bu
Tecophilaea	Tecophila Billotti (1802 or 1803 – 1885 or 1886), Italian botanical artist	Tecophilaeaceae	Ch
Teedia	Johann Georg Teede, German botanist who collected plants in Portugal	Scrophulariaceae	Bu
Teesdalia	Robert Teesdale (1740–1804), English botanist who worked as head gardener for Frederick Howard, 5th Earl of Carlisle; cofounder of the Linnean Society of London	Brassicaceae	Bu
Teijsmanniodendron	Johannes Elias Teijsmann (1808–1882)	Lamiaceae	Bu
Teixeiranthus	Alcides Ribeiro Teixeira (1918–2003), Brazilian botanist and mycologist in São Paulo	Asteraceae	Bu
Telekia	Sámuel Teleki (1739–1822), nobleman and patron	Asteraceae	Co
Telfairia	Charles Telfair (1778–1833)	Cucurbitaceae	Bu
Templetonia	John Templeton (1766–1825)	Fabaceae	St
Tennantia	James Robert Tennant (b. 1928), British botanist at Kew Gardens	Rubiaceae	Bu
Tenrhynea	Willem ten Rhijne (1647–1700)	Asteraceae	Bu
Ternstroemia	Christopher Tärnström (1703–1746), student of Linnaeus	Pentaphylacaceae	St
Tersonia	Joséphine Louise Moquin-Tandon, born de Terson (1819–1890), wife of the French botanist Alfred Moquin-Tandon, the author of this genus	Gyrostemonaceae	Bu
Tessaria	Ludovico Tessari (18th century), Italian doctor and professor of botany in Ancona	Asteraceae	Qu
Tessiera	Henri-Alexandre Tessier (1741–1837), French doctor and agronomist	Rubiaceae	Bu
Tessmannia	Günther Tessmann (1884–1969), German-Brazilian ethnologist and botanist; African explorer and plant collector; settled in Brazil	Fabaceae	Qu
Tessmanniacanthus	Günther Tessmann (1884–1969), German-Brazilian ethnologist and botanist; African explorer and plant collector; settled in Brazil	Acanthaceae	Qu
Tessmannianthus	Günther Tessmann (1884–1969), German-Brazilian ethnologist and botanist; African explorer and plant collector; settled in Brazil	Melastomataceae	Qu
Testulea	Georges Marie Patrice Charles Le Testu (1877–1967), French colonial administrator in tropical Africa; later worked at a botanical garden in Caen	Ochnaceae	Bu
Teuscheria	Henry Teuscher (1891–1984)	Orchidaceae	Bu
Teyleria	Pieter Teyler van der Hulst (1702–1778), merchant, collector and patron	Fabaceae	Bu
Thalia	Johannes Thal (1542–1583), German botanist	Marantaceae	Co
Thamnoldenlandia	Henrik Bernard Oldenland (1663–1697)	Rubiaceae	Bu
Thawatchaia	Thawatchai Santisuk (b. 1944), Thai herbarium director in Bangkok, and Thawatchai Wongprasert (fl. 2000), plant collector	Podostemaceae	Bu
Theilera	Arnold Theiler (1867–1936), veterinarian	Campanulaceae	Bu
Themistoclesia	Themistocles (c. 525 BC – c. 459 BC), politician and military leader	Ericaceae	Bu
Thenardia	Louis Jacques Thénard (1777–1857), chemist	Apocynaceae	Bu
Theodorovia	Andrey A. Fedorov (1908–1987)	Campanulaceae	Bu
Theophrasta	Theophrastus (c. 371 BC – 287 BC)	Primulaceae	St
Thepparatia	Sirindhorn (b. 1955), princess	Malvaceae	Bu
Thevenotia	Jean de Thévenot (1633–1667)	Asteraceae	Bu
Thevetia	André Thevet (1516–1590), clergyman and explorer	Apocynaceae	St
Thibaudia	Étienne Thibaud (d. 1813), French doctor and professor of botany, member of a natural history society in Edinburgh and the Linnean Society of London	Ericaceae	Bu
Thinouia	André Thouin (1747–1824)	Sapindaceae	Bu
Thiollierea	Victor Thiollière (1801–1859)	Rubiaceae	Bu
Thiseltonia	George Henry Thiselton-Dyer (1879–1944), English engineer; collected in Australia and New Zealand	Asteraceae	Bu
Thismia	Thomas Smith (d. 1825?), English microscopist; worked with Robert Brown	Burmanniaceae	Bu
Thomandersia	Thomas Anderson (1832–1870)	Thomandersiaceae	Bu
Thomasia	Pierre Thomas (1708–1781) and family, 18th- and 19th-century Swiss collectors	Malvaceae	St
Thompsonella	Charles Henry Thompson (1870–1931), American botanist who taught at the Missouri Botanical Garden	Crassulaceae	Bu
Thonningia	Peter Thonning (1775–1848)	Balanophoraceae	Bu
Thoreauea	Henry David Thoreau (1817–1862), writer and philosopher	Apocynaceae	Bu
Thorncroftia	Georg Thorncroft (1857–1934), English-born South African businessman, botanist and plant collector	Lamiaceae	Bu
Thottea	Otto Thott (1703–1785), minister of state	Aristolochiaceae	Bu
Thouinia	André Thouin (1747–1824)	Sapindaceae	Qu
Thouinidium	André Thouin (1747–1824)	Sapindaceae	Qu
Threlkeldia	Caleb Threlkeld (1676–1728)	Amaranthaceae	Bu
Thuarea	Louis-Marie Aubert du Petit-Thouars (1758–1831)	Poaceae	Bu
Thulinia	Mats Thulin (b. 1948), Swedish botanist who worked at Uppsala University	Orchidaceae	Bu
Thunbergia	Carl Peter Thunberg (1743–1828)	Acanthaceae	Co
Thunia	Franz Anton von Thun-Hohenstein (1786–1873), Austrian nobleman and statesman who supported science and was knowledgeable about orchids	Orchidaceae	Bu
Thurnia	Everard im Thurn (1852–1932)	Thurniaceae	Bu
Thurovia	Frederick William Thurow (1852–1931), German-born American plant collector in Texas	Asteraceae	Bu
Thurya	Jean Marc Antoine Thury (1822–1905), Swiss naturalist; professor of botany at the university in Geneva	Caryophyllaceae	Bu
Tidestromia	Ivar Frederick Tidestrøm (1864–1956), Swedish-born American botanist in medical service in the military	Amaranthaceae	Bu
Tiedemannia	Friedrich Tiedemann (1781–1861)	Apiaceae	Bu
Tieghemella	Philippe Édouard Léon Van Tieghem (1839–1914)	Sapotaceae	Bu
Tietkensia	William Tietkens (1844–1933)	Asteraceae	Bu
Tilesia	Wilhelm Gottlieb Tilesius von Tilenau (1769–1857)	Asteraceae	Bu
Tilingia	Heinrich Sylvester Theodor Tiling (1818–1871)	Apiaceae	Bu
Tillandsia	Elias Tillandz (1640–1693)	Bromeliaceae	St
Tinantia	François Auguste Tinant (1803–1853), botanist in Luxembourg	Commelinaceae	St
Tinnea	Alexine Tinne (1835–1869), along with her mother and aunt, in honour of their African expedition in 1861	Lamiaceae	St
Tirpitzia	Alfred von Tirpitz (1849–1930), admiral	Linaceae	Bu
Tisonia	Eugène Édouard Augustin Tison (1842–1932), French doctor and professor of botany	Salicaceae	Bu
Todaroa	Agostino Todaro (1818–1892)	Apiaceae	Bu
Tofieldia	Thomas Tofield (1730–1779), English hydrological engineer and botanist	Tofieldiaceae	Bu
Tolmiea	William Fraser Tolmie (1812–1886), doctor	Saxifragaceae	Co
Tomzanonia	Thomas A. Zanoni (b. 1949), American botanist at the New York Botanical Garden	Orchidaceae	Bu
Torenia	Olof Torén (1718–1753), reverend	Linderniaceae	St
Torralbasia	José Ildefonso Torralbas (1842–1903), Cuban botanist and agronomist; director of the university botanical museum in Havana and professor at the university	Celastraceae	Bu
Torreya	John Torrey (1796–1873)	Taxaceae	St
Torreyochloa	John Torrey (1796–1873)	Poaceae	Bu
Torricellia	Evangelista Torricelli (1608–1647), physicist and mathematician	Torricelliaceae	Bu
Touchardia	Philippe Victor Touchard (1810–1879), French vice-admiral	Urticaceae	Bu
Tournaya	Roland Louis Jules Alfred Tournay (1925–1972), Belgian botanist; publisher of the bulletin of the National Botanic Garden of Belgium (now the Meise Botanic Garden)	Fabaceae	Bu
Tournefortia	Joseph Pitton de Tournefort (1656–1708)	Heliotropiaceae	St
Tourneuxia	Aristide-Horace Letourneux (1820–1890), French magistrate, botanist and zoologist in Algeria, and Henri René Letourneux de la Perraudière (1831–1861), French botanist who collected in France and Algeria and on the islands of Madeira and the Canaries	Asteraceae	Bu
Tournonia	Dominique Jérôme Tournon (1758–1829), French doctor and botanist, botanical garden director in Toulouse	Basellaceae	Bu
Tourrettia	Marc Antoine Louis Claret de La Tourrette (1729–1793)	Bignoniaceae	Qu
Toussaintia	Léon Louis Emile Toussaint (1914–1997), Belgian botanist and agronomist	Annonaceae	Bu
Tovaria	Simón de Tovar, Spanish doctor and botanist	Tovariaceae	Bu
Townsendia	David Townsend (1787–1858), American botanist in Pennsylvania	Asteraceae	St
Townsonia	William Townson (1850–1926), English-born New Zealander; pharmacologist and plant collector	Orchidaceae	Bu
Tozzia	Bruno Tozzi (1656–1743), Italian clergyman, botanist and mycologist	Orobanchaceae	Bu
Tracyina	Joseph Prince Tracy (1879–1953), American botanist and plant collector	Asteraceae	Bu
Tradescantia	John Tradescant (1608–1662)	Commelinaceae	Co
Tragia	Hieronymus Bock (1498–1554), Latinised as Hieronymus Tragus	Euphorbiaceae	Bu
Tragiella	Hieronymus Bock (1498–1554), Latinised as Hieronymus Tragus	Euphorbiaceae	Bu
Tragus	Hieronymus Bock (1498–1554), Latinised as Hieronymus Tragus	Poaceae	Bu
Trailliaedoxa	Clementina Forrest, born Traill (1877–1937), collected this plant in Yunnan, China; wife and colleague of George Forrest	Rubiaceae	Bu
Trattinnickia	Leopold Trattinnick (1764–1849)	Burseraceae	Bu
Traubia	Hamilton Paul Traub (1890–1983)	Amaryllidaceae	Bu
Traunsteinera	Joseph Traunsteiner (1798–1850), Austrian apothecary and botanist	Orchidaceae	Bu
Trautvetteria	Ernst Rudolf von Trautvetter (1809–1889)	Ranunculaceae	St
Traversia	William Travers (1819–1903)	Asteraceae	Bu
Treculia	Auguste Trécul (1818–1896)	Moraceae	Bu
Treichelia	Alexander Johann August Treichel (1837–1901), German lawyer; secretary of the botanical union in Brandenburg	Campanulaceae	Bu
Trembleya	Abraham Trembley (1710–1784), Jean Trembley (1704–1785), Swiss mathematician, and Jacques-André Trembley (1714–1763), Swiss botanist	Melastomataceae	Qu
Treutlera	William John Treutler (1841–1915), British doctor who also worked at Kew Gardens	Apocynaceae	Bu
Trevesia	Enrichetta Treves de Bonfigli (1790–1858), Italian botanical patron, and her grandsons	Araliaceae	St
Trevoria	Trevor Lawrence, 2nd Baronet (1831–1913)	Orchidaceae	Bu
Trianaea	José Jerónimo Triana (1828–1890)	Solanaceae	Bu
Tribounia	Pramote Triboun (fl. 1990–2002), Thai botanist at the Thailand Institute of Scientific and Technological Research	Gesneriaceae	Bu
Trieenea	Elsie Elizabeth Esterhuysen (1912–2006)	Scrophulariaceae	Bu
Trimenia	Henry Trimen (1843–1896)	Trimeniaceae	Bu
Trinia	Carl Bernhard von Trinius (1778–1844)	Apiaceae	Bu
Triniochloa	Carl Bernhard von Trinius (1778–1844)	Poaceae	Bu
Tristania	Jules Marie Claude de Tristan (1776–1861), French botanist; botanical garden administrator in Orléans	Myrtaceae	St
Tristaniopsis	Jules Marie Claude de Tristan (1776–1861), French botanist; botanical garden administrator in Orléans	Myrtaceae	Bu
Triumfetta	Giovanni Battista Triumfetti (1658–1708), Italian doctor and director of the university botanical garden in Rome	Malvaceae	Bu
Trochetia	Henri Dutrochet (1776–1847)	Malvaceae	Bu
Trochetiopsis	Henri Dutrochet (1776–1847)	Malvaceae	Bu
Trozelia	Clas Blechert Trozelius (1719–1794), Swedish clergyman and botanist; professor of economics at Lund University	Solanaceae	Bu
Tryonia	Alice Faber de Tryon (1920–2009), American botanist (mainly Pteridology)	Pteridaceae	Bt
Tsaiorchis	Cai Xitao (1911–1981)	Orchidaceae	Qu
Tuctoria	anagram of Orcuttia, after Charles Russell Orcutt (1864–1929)	Poaceae	Qu
Tugarinovia	Arkadi Jakovlevits Tugarinov (1880–1948), Russian biologist (ornithologist), director of the museum in Krasnoyarsk	Asteraceae	Bu
Tulbaghia	Ryk Tulbagh (1699–1771), colonial administrator	Amaryllidaceae	Co
Tupeia	Tupaia (1725–1770), Polynesian navigator	Loranthaceae	Bu
Turczaninovia	Nikolai Turczaninow (1796–1863)	Asteraceae	Bu
Turgenia	Alexander Turgenev (1784–1845), historian	Apiaceae	Bu
Turgeniopsis	Alexander Turgenev (1784–1845), historian	Apiaceae	Bu
Turnera	William Turner (c. 1508 – 1568)	Passifloraceae	St
Turpinia	Pierre Jean François Turpin (1775–1840)	Staphyleaceae	Bu
Turraea	Antonio Turra (1730–1796), Italian doctor and botanist in Vicenza	Meliaceae	St
Turraeanthus	Antonio Turra (1730–1796), Italian doctor and botanist in Vicenza	Meliaceae	Bu
Turrillia	William Bertram Turrill (1890–1961)	Proteaceae	Bu
Tweedia	John Tweedie (1775–1862), Scottish-born Argentinian gardener and botanist	Apocynaceae	Ba
Tyleria	Sidney Frederick Tyler (1907–1993), American banker and cattle rancher; supporter of charitable organizations	Ochnaceae	Bu
Tyleropappus	Sidney Frederick Tyler (1907–1993), American banker and cattle rancher; supporter of charitable organizations	Asteraceae	Bu
Tzveleviochloa	Nikolai Tzvelev (1925–2015), Russian botanist, specialist in grasses and ferns	Poaceae	Bt
Tzvelevopyrethrum	Nikolai Tzvelev (1925–2015), Russian botanist, specialist in grasses and ferns	Asteraceae	Bu
Uebelinia	Johann Jakob Übelin (1793–1873), Swiss clergyman, botanical enthusiast	Caryophyllaceae	Bu
Uebelmannia	Werner Uebelmann (1921–2014)	Cactaceae	Bu
Uittienia	Hendrik Uittien (1898–1944), Dutch botanist, curator in Utrecht and Deventer	Fabaceae	Bu
Uleanthus	Ernst Heinrich Georg Ule (1854–1915)	Fabaceae	Qu
Ulearum	Ernst Heinrich Georg Ule (1854–1915)	Araceae	Qu
Uleiorchis	Ernst Heinrich Georg Ule (1854–1915)	Orchidaceae	Qu
Uleophytum	Ernst Heinrich Georg Ule (1854–1915)	Asteraceae	Qu
Ulleria	Jean Ruel (1474–1537)	Acanthaceae	Bu
Ungeria	Franz Unger (1800–1870)	Malvaceae	Bu
Ungernia	Franz Ungern-Sternberg (1808–1885), Baltic German botanist and doctor in Turin, Italy	Amaryllidaceae	Bu
Ungnadia	David Ungnad von Sonnegg (1530–1600), ambassador	Sapindaceae	St
Urbanodendron	Ignatz Urban (1848–1931)	Lauraceae	Bu
Urbinella	Manuel Urbina y Altamirano (1843–1906), Mexican doctor, apothecary, botanist and zoologist	Asteraceae	Bu
Uribea	Antonio Lorenzo Uribe Uribe (1900–1980), Colombian clergyman, botanist and zoologist, and his father Joachim Antonio Uribe (1858–1935), Colombian instructor and naturalist	Fabaceae	Bu
Urmenetea	Hieronymus Urmeneta (1816–1881), Chilean administrator; agricultural society president	Asteraceae	Bu
Uroskinnera	George Ure Skinner (1804–1867), English merchant, ornithologist and plant collector	Plantaginaceae	Bu
Ursinia	Johannes Heinrich Ursinus (1608–1667)	Asteraceae	St
Urvillea	Jules Dumont d'Urville (1790–1842)	Sapindaceae	Bu
Usteria	Paul Usteri (1768–1831)	Loganiaceae	Bu
Utleya	Kathleen Burt-Utley (b. 1944) and her husband John F. Utley (b. 1944), American botanists at the University of Florida and the University of New Orleans	Ericaceae	Bu
Uvedalia	Robert Uvedale (1642–1722)	Phrymaceae	Bu
Vachellia	George Harvey Vachell (1799–1839), clergyman	Fabaceae	Qu
Vahlia	Martin Vahl (1749–1804)	Vahliaceae	Qu
Vahlodea	Jens Vahl (1796–1854)	Poaceae	Bu
Vailia	Anna Murray Vail (1863–1955)	Apocynaceae	Bu
Valantia	Sébastien Vaillant (1669–1722)	Rubiaceae	Bu
Valdivia	Pedro de Valdivia (1497–1553), conquistador	Escalloniaceae	Bu
Vallea	Felice Spirito Valle (1715–1747), Italian military doctor and botanist; collected in the Alps and on Corsica	Elaeocarpaceae	Bu
Vallesia	Francisco Vallés (1524–1592), doctor	Apocynaceae	Bu
Vallisneria	Antonio Vallisneri (1661–1730)	Hydrocharitaceae	St
Vancouveria	George Vancouver (1758–1798), explorer	Berberidaceae	Co
Vandasina	Karel Vandas (1861–1923), Bohemian-born Czech botanist and teacher in Prague	Fabaceae	Bu
Vandellia	Domenico Vandelli (1735–1816)	Linderniaceae	Bu
Vanheerdea	Pieter van Heerde (1893–1979), South African teacher and plant collector	Aizoaceae	Bu
Vanhouttea	Louis van Houtte (1810–1876)	Gesneriaceae	Bu
Vanoverberghia	Morice Vanoverbergh (1885–1987), Belgian clergyman and amateur botanist	Zingiberaceae	Bu
Van-royena	Pieter van Royen (1923–2002)	Sapotaceae	Bu
Vanwykia	Pieter van Wyck (1931–2006), South African botanist and ecologist	Loranthaceae	Bu
Vanzijlia	Dorothy Constantia van Zijl (1886–1938), South African plant collector	Aizoaceae	Bu
Vargasiella	Julio César Vargas Calderón (1903–2002), Peruvian naturalist, professor of botany and director of the botanical museum in Cusco	Orchidaceae	Bu
Varronia	Marcus Terentius Varro (116–27 BC), polymath and writer	Boraginaceae	Bu
Vasconcellea	Simão de Vasconcelos (1597 – c. 1672), Brazilian clergyman, historian and writer	Caricaceae	Bu
Vaseyochloa	George Vasey (1822–1893)	Poaceae	Qu
Vasqueziella	Roberto Vásquez (1941–2015), Bolivian naturalist, professor of botany, specialist in Bolivian orchids	Orchidaceae	Bu
Vateria	Abraham Vater (1684–1751)	Dipterocarpaceae	Bu
Vateriopsis	Abraham Vater (1684–1751)	Dipterocarpaceae	Bu
Vatovaea	Aristocle Vatova (1897–1992), Italian botanist (with a focus on algae) in Rovinj	Fabaceae	Bu
Vatricania	Louis Félix Vatrican (1904–2007), agricultural engineer from Monaco, director of the national Jardin Exotique	Cactaceae	Bu
Vauquelinia	Louis Nicolas Vauquelin (1763–1829)	Rosaceae	Bu
Vavilovia	Nikolai Vavilov (1887–1943)	Fabaceae	Bu
Veitchia	James Veitch Jr. (1815–1869) and his son John Gould Veitch	Arecaceae	St
Velascoa	José María Velasco Gómez (1840–1912), painter and naturalist	Crossosomataceae	Bu
Veldkampia	Jan Frederik Veldkamp (1941–2017)	Poaceae	Bt
Velleia	Thomas Velley (1748–1806)	Goodeniaceae	Bu
Vellosiella	José Mariano de Conceição Vellozo (1742–1811)	Orobanchaceae	Bu
Vellozia	Joaquim Velloso de Miranda (1733–1815), Brazilian clergyman and plant collector	Velloziaceae	Bu
Veltheimia	August Ferdinand von Veltheim (1741–1801)	Asparagaceae	St
Venegasia	Miguel Venegas (1680–1764)	Asteraceae	Bu
Ventenata	Étienne Pierre Ventenat (1757–1808)	Poaceae	Bu
Verdesmum	Bernard Verdcourt (1925–2011)	Fabaceae	Bu
Verhuellia	Quirijn Maurits Rudolph Ver Huell (1787–1860), Dutch rear admiral, illustrator and entomologist	Piperaceae	Bu
Vernonanthura	William Vernon (1666 or 1667 – c. 1713), English plant collector; collected in the US state of Maryland for the Royal Society	Asteraceae	Bu
Vernonia	William Vernon (1666 or 1667 – c. 1713), English plant collector; collected in the US state of Maryland for the Royal Society	Asteraceae	Co
Vernoniopsis	William Vernon (1666 or 1667 – c. 1713), English plant collector; collected in the US state of Maryland for the Royal Society	Asteraceae	Qu
Verreauxia	Jules Verreaux (1807–1873)	Goodeniaceae	Bu
Verschaffeltia	Ambroise Verschaffelt (1825–1886)	Arecaceae	St
Vesalea	Andreas Vesalius (1514–1564), Belgian anatomist and physician to Charles V, Holy Roman Emperor	Caprifoliaceae	Bt
Veselskya	Friedrich Veselský (1813–1866), Bohemian lawyer in present-day Prešov; amateur botanist with a focus on mushrooms	Brassicaceae	Bu
Vesper	Fengjie Sun (b. 1968) and Stephen Roy Downie (b. 1959), American botanists and evolutionary biologists in Georgia	Apiaceae	Bu
Vesselowskya	E. Vesselowsky, Russian scientist from Saratov	Cunoniaceae	Bu
Vestia	Lorenz Chrysanth von Vest (1776–1840)	Solanaceae	Co
Veyretella	Yvonne Veyret (b. 1925), French botanist and plant collector at the National Museum of Natural History; specialist in orchids	Orchidaceae	Bu
Veyretia	Yvonne Veyret (b. 1925), French botanist and plant collector at the National Museum of Natural History; specialist in orchids	Orchidaceae	Bu
Vicatia	Philippe-Rodolphe Vicat (1742–1783), Swiss doctor and botanist in Warsaw, Poland, and Lausanne	Apiaceae	Bu
Vicoa	Giambattista Vico (1668–1744), philosopher	Asteraceae	Bu
Victoria	Queen Victoria (1819–1901)	Nymphaeaceae	St
Vidalasia	Jules Eugène Vidal (1914 – after 2016), French botanist at the National Museum of Natural History; specialist in the flora of Southeast Asia	Rubiaceae	Bu
Vieraea	José de Viera y Clavijo (1731–1813)	Asteraceae	Bu
Vigna	Dominico Vigna (d. 1647), Italian botanist	Fabaceae	St
Viguiera	Louis Guillaume Alexandre Viguier (1790–1867), French doctor and botanist from Montpellier	Asteraceae	Bu
Viguieranthus	René Viguier (1880–1931)	Fabaceae	Bu
Viguierella	René Viguier (1880–1931)	Poaceae	Bu
Villadia	Manuel Maria Villada (1841–1924), Mexican mineralogist, geologist and paleobotanist	Crassulaceae	Bu
Villanova	Tomás Manuel Vilanova Muñoz y Poyanos (1737–1802), Spanish doctor and botanist; professor of botany and chemistry at the University of Valencia	Asteraceae	Bu
Villaria	Celestino Fernández-Villar (1838–1907)	Rubiaceae	Bu
Villarsia	Dominique Villars (1745–1814)	Menyanthaceae	St
Villasenoria	José Luis Villaseñor (b. 1954), Mexican professor of botany in Mexico City; specialist in New World tropical flora	Asteraceae	Bu
Virgilia	Virgil (70–19 BC), poet	Fabaceae	St
Viridivia	Percy James Greenway (1897–1980), South African botanist at the agricultural research station and herbarium in Nairobi, Kenya	Passifloraceae	Bu
Virotia	Robert Virot (1915–2002)	Proteaceae	Bu
Viscainoa	Sebastián Vizcaíno (1548 – c. 1625), military officer and explorer	Zygophyllaceae	Qu
Vismia	Gérard de Visme (c. 1725 – c. 1797), French and English merchant in Lisbon, Portugal	Hypericaceae	Bu
Vismianthus	Gérard de Visme (c. 1725 – c. 1797), French and English merchant in Lisbon, Portugal	Connaraceae	Bu
Visnea	Gérard de Visme (c. 1725 – c. 1797), French and English merchant in Lisbon, Portugal	Pentaphylacaceae	Bu
Vitekorchis	Ernst Vitek (b. 1953), Austrian botanist at the museum of natural history in Vienna	Orchidaceae	Bu
Vittadinia	Carlo Vittadini (1800–1865)	Asteraceae	St
Vittetia	Nelly Elsa Vittet (d. 1995), Argentinian botanist at the natural science museum in Buenos Aires	Asteraceae	Bu
Viviania	Domenico Viviani (1772–1840)	Francoaceae	Bu
Vlokia	Johannes Hendrik Jacobus Vlok (b. 1957), forester in South Africa	Aizoaceae	Bu
Volkameria	Johann Georg Volkamer, the Younger (1662–1744), German doctor and botanist in Nuremberg	Lamiaceae	Bu
Volkensinia	Georg Volkens (1855–1917)	Amaranthaceae	Bu
Vossia	Johann Heinrich Voss (1751–1826), classicist	Poaceae	Bu
Votschia	Oskar Hermann Wilhelm Votsch (1879–1927), German botanist and teacher in Delitzsch	Primulaceae	Bu
Vriesea	Willem Hendrik de Vriese (1806–1862)	Bromeliaceae	St
Vrydagzynea	Theodor Daniel Vrydag or Vrydag Zijnen (1799–1863), Dutch apothecary from The Hague; wrote about Cinchona	Orchidaceae	Bu
Vulpiella	Johann Samuel Vulpius (1760–1846), German apothecary in Stuttgart and Pforzheim	Poaceae	Bu
Vvedenskya	Aleksai Ivanovich Vvedensky (1898–1972), Russian botanist at herbariums in Penza and Tashkent	Apiaceae	Bu
Wachendorfia	Evert Jacob van Wachendorff (1702–1758), Dutch botanist	Haemodoraceae	St
Wahlenbergia	Göran Wahlenberg (1780–1851)	Campanulaceae	St
Waitzia	Karl Friedrich Waitz (1774–1848), German botanist and agronomist in Saxe-Altenburg	Asteraceae	Bu
Waldsteinia	Franz de Paula Adam von Waldstein (1759–1823)	Rosaceae	Co
Wallacea	Alfred Russel Wallace (1823–1913)	Ochnaceae	Bu
Wallaceodendron	Alfred Russel Wallace (1823–1913)	Fabaceae	Bu
Wallenia	Mathew Wallen (18th century), Irish naval officer and botanical enthusiast; raised native and exotic plants near Kingston, Jamaica	Primulaceae	Qu
Walleria	Horace Waller (1833–1896)	Tecophilaeaceae	Bu
Wallichia	Nathaniel Wallich (1786–1854)	Arecaceae	St
Wallisia	Gustav Wallis (1830–1878)	Bromeliaceae	Bu
Walteranthus	Hans Paul Heinrich Walter (b. 1882), German botanist who worked with Adolf Engler	Gyrostemonaceae	Bu
Waltheria	Augustin Friedrich Walther (1688–1746)	Malvaceae	Qu
Waltillia	Walter Till (b. 1956), Austrian botanist, herbarium director in Vienna	Bromeliaceae	Bu
Walwhalleya	Ralph Derwyn Broughton Whalley (b. 1933), American botanist; specialist in grasses	Poaceae	Bu
Wangenheimia	Friedrich Adam Julius von Wangenheim (1749–1800)	Poaceae	Bu
Warburgia	Otto Warburg (1859–1938)	Canellaceae	Bu
Warczewiczella	Józef Warszewicz (1812–1866)	Orchidaceae	St
Warionia	Adrien Warion (1837–1880)	Asteraceae	Bu
Warmingia	Eugenius Warming (1841–1924)	Orchidaceae	Bu
Warneckea	Otto Warnecke (b. c. 1873), German gardener and plant collector in German East Africa (roughly present-day Tanzania) and Ballenstedt	Melastomataceae	Bu
Warnockia	Barton Holland Warnock (1911–1998)	Lamiaceae	Bu
Warrea	Frederick James Warre (1798–1872), English businessman, mining association director in Rio de Janeiro; collected orchids	Orchidaceae	Bu
Warreella	Frederick James Warre (1798–1872), English businessman, mining association director in Rio de Janeiro; collected orchids	Orchidaceae	Bu
Warreopsis	Frederick James Warre (1798–1872), English businessman, mining association director in Rio de Janeiro; collected orchids	Orchidaceae	Bu
Warszewiczia	Józef Warszewicz (1812–1866)	Rubiaceae	Bu
Washingtonia	George Washington (1732–1799), president of the United States	Arecaceae	Co
Watsonia	William Watson (1715–1787)	Iridaceae	Co
Weberbauera	Augusto Weberbauer (1871–1948)	Brassicaceae	Qu
Weberbauerella	Augusto Weberbauer (1871–1948)	Fabaceae	Qu
Weberbauerocereus	Augusto Weberbauer (1871–1948)	Cactaceae	Qu
Weberocereus	Frédéric Albert Constantin Weber (1830–1903)	Cactaceae	Bu
Weddellina	Hugh Algernon Weddell (1819–1877)	Podostemaceae	Bu
Wedelia	Georg Wolfgang Wedel (1645–1721)	Asteraceae	St
Weigela	Christian Ehrenfried Weigel (1748–1831)	Caprifoliaceae	Co
Weinmannia	Johann Wilhelm Weinmann (1683–1741)	Cunoniaceae	St
Welchiodendron	Marcus Baldwin Welch (1895–1942), New Zealand botanist and chemist in the sugar industry, in munitions manufacturing in Scotland, and in other jobs in Australia	Myrtaceae	Bu
Weldenia	Ludwig von Welden (1780–1853), army officer	Commelinaceae	St
Welfia	George V of Hanover (1819–1878)	Arecaceae	Bu
Wellstedia	James Raymond Wellsted (1805–1842), naval officer	Boraginaceae	Bu
Welwitschia	Friedrich Welwitsch (1806–1872)	Welwitschiaceae	Ch
Welwitschiella	Friedrich Welwitsch (1806–1872)	Asteraceae	Bu
Wenchengia	Wen Chen Wu (1898–1942), Chinese professor of botany with a focus on Chinese flora	Lamiaceae	Bu
Wendlandia	Heinrich Wendland (1792–1869) and possibly Johann Christoph Wendland (1755–1828)	Rubiaceae	Bu
Wendlandiella	Heinrich Wendland (1792–1869)	Arecaceae	Bu
Wenzelia	Chester A. Wenzel (1882–1929), American teacher, cattle rancher and plant collector in the Philippines	Rutaceae	Bu
Werauhia	Werner Rauh (1913–2000)	Bromeliaceae	Bu
Wercklea	Karl Wercklé (1860–1924), French-Lorrainer and Costa Rican gardener and botanist; also worked in the United States	Malvaceae	Bu
Werneria	Abraham Gottlob Werner (1749–1817)	Asteraceae	Bu
Westoniella	Arthur Stewart Weston (b. 1932), American botanist with a focus on Costa Rican plants	Asteraceae	Qu
Westringia	Johan Peter Westring (1753–1833), Swedish physician and lichenologist	Lamiaceae	St
Wetria	Christoph Jacob Trew (1695–1769)	Euphorbiaceae	Bu
Wettinia	Frederick Augustus I of Saxony (1750–1827)	Arecaceae	Bu
Wettsteiniola	Richard Wettstein (1863–1931)	Podostemaceae	Bu
Whipplea	Amiel Weeks Whipple (1818–1863), military officer	Saxifragaceae	Bu
Whiteochloa	Cyril Tenison White (1890–1950)	Poaceae	Bu
Whiteodendron	Cyril Tenison White (1890–1950)	Myrtaceae	Bu
Whitesloanea	Alain Campbell White (1880–1951), American botanist, and Boyd Lincoln Sloane (1885–1955), American botanist	Apocynaceae	Bu
Whitfieldia	Thomas Whitfield, plant and animal collector in the 1840s in West Africa	Acanthaceae	Bu
Whitfordiodendron	Harry Nichols Whitford (1872–1941), American forester and professor of tropical forestry at Yale University	Fabaceae	Bu
Whitmorea	Timothy Charles Whitmore (1935–2002), English ecologist, botanist, geologist and climatologist	Stemonuraceae	Bu
Whittonia	Brian Alan Whitton (b. 1935), English botanist at Durham University	Peridiscaceae	Bu
Whytockia	James Whytock (1845–1926), English gardener in Ireland and at various Scottish castles and estates; president of the Scottish Horticultural Association and the Botanical Society of Edinburgh	Gesneriaceae	Bu
Wiborgia	Erik Viborg (1759–1822)	Fabaceae	Bu
Wiborgiella	Erik Viborg (1759–1822)	Fabaceae	Bt
Widdringtonia	Samuel Edward Cook (1787–1856)	Cupressaceae	Bu
Wielandia	Joseph Fridolin Wieland (1804–1872), German-born Swiss botanist and doctor in Aargau	Phyllanthaceae	Bu
Wiesneria	Julius Wiesner (1838–1916)	Alismataceae	Bu
Wigandia	Johann Wigand (1523–1587), bishop	Hydrophyllaceae	St
Wightia	Robert Wight (1796–1872)	Paulowniaceae	Qu
Wikstroemia	Johan Emanuel Wikström (1789–1856)	Thymelaeaceae	Ba
Wilbrandia	Johann Bernhard Wilbrand (1779–1846)	Cucurbitaceae	Bu
Wilhelmsia	Wilhelms, Russian botanist; collected plants in Georgia	Caryophyllaceae	Bu
Wilkesia	Charles Wilkes (1798–1877), naval officer	Asteraceae	Bu
Wilkiea	David Elliott Wilkie (1815–1885), Scottish-born Australian doctor in Melbourne; vice-president of what is now the Royal Society of Victoria	Monimiaceae	Bu
Willdenowia	Carl Ludwig Willdenow (1765–1812)	Restionaceae	Bu
Willemetia	Pierre Rémi Willemet (1735–1807), French botanist, professor of natural history and botanical garden director in Nancy	Asteraceae	Bu
Williamodendron	William Antônio Rodrigues (b. 1928)	Lauraceae	Bu
Willisia	John Christopher Willis (1868–1958)	Podostemaceae	Bu
Willkommia	Heinrich Moritz Willkomm (1821–1895)	Poaceae	Bu
Willughbeia	Francis Willughby (1635–1672)	Apocynaceae	Bu
Wilsonia	John Wilson (1696–1751), English shoemaker, baker and botanist	Convolvulaceae	Bu
Wimmerella	Franz Elfried Wimmer (1881–1961), Austrian clergyman and botanist; professor of natural history in Istanbul, Turkey; Viennese priest; specialist in Lobeliaceae	Campanulaceae	Bu
Wimmeria	Christian Friedrich Heinrich Wimmer (1803–1868)	Celastraceae	Bu
Windsorina	George V (1865–1936) and the House of Windsor	Rapateaceae	Bu
Winifredia	Winifred Curtis (1905–2005)	Restionaceae	Bu
Winklerella	Hubert Winkler (1875–1941)	Podostemaceae	Bu
Wintera (Note: Winteraceae, but not Wintera, is accepted at Plants of the World Online.)	John Winter (16th century), one of the ship captains of Francis Drake's circumnavigation	Winteraceae	Bu
Wisteria	Caspar Wistar (1761–1818), doctor	Fabaceae	Co
Withania	Henry Witham (1779–1844)	Solanaceae	Qu
Witheringia	William Withering (1741–1799)	Solanaceae	Bu
Witsenia	Nicolaes Witsen (1641–1717), statesman and writer	Iridaceae	Bu
Wittmackanthus	Ludwig Wittmack (1839–1929)	Rubiaceae	Bu
Wittmackia	Ludwig Wittmack (1839–1929)	Bromeliaceae	Bu
Wittsteinia	Georg Christian Wittstein (1810–1887)	Alismataceae	Bu
Wodyetia	Wodyeti (c. 1900 – 1978), Aboriginal Australian who first reported on this palm genus	Arecaceae	Bu
Wolffia	Johann Friedrich Wolff (1778–1806)	Araceae	Qu
Wolffiella	Johann Friedrich Wolff (1778–1806)	Araceae	Qu
Wollastonia	William Hyde Wollaston (1766–1828), chemist	Asteraceae	Bu
Woodburnia	John Woodburn (1843–1902), colonial administrator	Araliaceae	Bu
Woodfordia	Emperor John Alexander Woodford (1764–1817), English lawyer who maintained a large greenhouse in Vauxhall	Lythraceae	Bu
Woodia	John Medley Wood (1827–1915)	Apocynaceae	Bu
Wooleya	Charles Hugh Frederick Wooley (1894–1969), English naval officer, natural scientist and citrus grower; supplied Kirstenbosch National Botanical Garden with succulents from around South Africa	Aizoaceae	Bu
Woollsia	William Woolls (1814–1893)	Ericaceae	Bu
Worsleya	Arthington Worsley (1861–1944)	Amaryllidaceae	St
Wrightia	William Wright (1735–1819)	Apocynaceae	Bu
Wulfenia	Franz Xaver von Wulfen (1728–1805)	Plantaginaceae	St
Wulfeniopsis	Franz Xaver von Wulfen (1728–1805)	Plantaginaceae	Qu
Wullschlaegelia	Heinrich Wullschlägel (1805–1864)	Orchidaceae	Bu
Wunderlichia	Christian Karl Wunderlich (1778–1855), German-born Russian apothecary's assistant, teacher, botanist, office worker and organist in present-day Volgograd; built up a herbarium	Asteraceae	Bu
Wurdastom	John Julius Wurdack (1921–1998), American botanist at the New York Botanical Garden and the Smithsonian Institution	Melastomataceae	Bu
Wurfbainia	Johann Siegmund Wurffbain (1613–1661), German traveler in the service of the Dutch East India Company as a soldier and merchant; also a councilman in Nuremberg	Zingiberaceae	Bu
Wurmbea	Friedrich von Wurmb (1742–1781)	Colchicaceae	Bu
Wydleria	Heinrich Wydler (1800–1883)	Apiaceae	Bu
Wyethia	Nathaniel Jarvis Wyeth (1802–1856), businessman and explorer	Asteraceae	St
Xatardia	Barthélemy Joseph Paul Xatard (1774–1846), French apothecary and botanist who collected in the eastern Pyrenees	Apiaceae	Bu
Ximenia	Francisco Ximénez (d. 1620), Spanish clergyman and naturalist (botanist), missionary in Spanish Florida	Olacaceae	Bu
Yabea	Yoshitaka Yabe (1876–1931), Japanese professor of botany at the College of Arts and Sciences in Tokyo	Apiaceae	Bu
Yeatesia	William Smith Yeates (1856–1908), American geologist, professor in Georgia; collected along the Flint River	Acanthaceae	Bu
Yoania	Udagawa Yōan (1798–1846), chemist and translator	Orchidaceae	Bu
Youngia	Edward Young (1684–1765), poet, and Thomas Young (1773–1829), scientist	Asteraceae	Bu
Yvesia	Alfred Marie Augustin Saint-Yves (1855–1933), French soldier and botanist who settled in Nice and focused on grasses	Poaceae	Bu
Zabelia	Hermann Zabel (1832–1912)	Caprifoliaceae	Bu
Zaluzania	Adam Zalužanský ze Zalužan (1558–1613), Bohemian botanist and doctor in Prague; also taught at Charles University	Asteraceae	Bu
Zaluzianskya	Adam Zalužanský ze Zalužan (1558–1613), Bohemian botanist and doctor in Prague; also taught at Charles University	Scrophulariaceae	Co
Zandera	Robert Zander (1892–1969), German botanist and horticulturist in Berlin	Asteraceae	Bu
Zannichellia	Gian Girolamo Zannichelli (1661–1729), Italian apothecary and natural scientist in Venice	Potamogetonaceae	Bu
Zanonia	Giacomo Zanoni (1615–1682), Italian botanist, botanical garden director in Bologna	Cucurbitaceae	Bu
Zantedeschia	Giovanni Zantedeschi (1773–1846)	Araceae	Co
Zehnderia	Alfons Zehnder (1920–1985), Swiss teacher and botanist in Wettingen with a focus on algae	Podostemaceae	Bu
Zehneria	Josef Zehner (19th century)	Cucurbitaceae	Bu
Zelenkoa	Harry Zelenko (b. 1928), American marketing designer and orchid grower	Orchidaceae	Bu
Zeltnera	Louis Zeltner (b. 1938) and his wife Nicole Zeltner (b. 1934), Swiss botanists with a focus on Gentianaceae	Gentianaceae	Bu
Zenia	H. C. Zen, scientist and government official	Fabaceae	Bu
Zenkerella	Georg August Zenker (1855–1922)	Fabaceae	Bu
Zenkeria	Jonathan Carl Zenker (1799–1837)	Poaceae	Bu
Zenobia	Zenobia (b. c. 240), queen	Ericaceae	Co
Zexmenia	José Mariano Jiménez (1781–1811), independence fighter	Asteraceae	Bu
Zeyheria	Johann Michael Zeyher (1770–1843)	Bignoniaceae	Bu
Zieria	John Zier (d. 1793), Polish and English apothecary and botanist, specialist in spore-bearing plants	Rutaceae	Bu
Zingeria	Vasili Yakovlevich Zinger (1836–1907)	Poaceae	Bu
Zinnia	Johann Gottfried Zinn (1727–1759)	Asteraceae	Co
Zinowiewia	Paul Zinowiew, botanist, curator at the university in present-day Kharkiv, Ukraine	Celastraceae	Bu
Zippelia	Alexander Zippelius (1797–1828)	Piperaceae	Bu
Zizia	Johann Baptist Ziz (1779–1829)	Apiaceae	Bu
Zizkaea	Georg Zizka (b. 1955), German evolutionary botanist; specialist in Bromeliaceae	Bromeliaceae	Bu
Zoegea	Johan Zoëga (1742–1788)	Asteraceae	Bu
Zollernia	Frederick William III of Prussia (1770–1840)	Fabaceae	Bu
Zollingeria	Heinrich Zollinger (1818–1859)	Sapindaceae	Bu
Zornia	Johannes Zorn (1739–1799)	Fabaceae	Bu
Zosima	Nikolaos Zosima (1758–1842), Anastasios Zosima (1754–1828) and Zois Zosima (1764–1828), Greek-Russian brothers and merchants in Moscow who supported naturalists	Apiaceae	Bu
Zotovia	Victor Zotov (1908–1977)	Poaceae	Bu
Zoysia	Karl von Zois (1756–1800)	Poaceae	St
Zuccagnia	Attilio Zuccagni (1754–1807), Italian botanist	Fabaceae	Bt
Zuccarinia	Joseph Gerhard Zuccarini (1797–1848)	Rubiaceae	Bt
Zuloagaea	Fernando Omar Zuloaga (b.1951), Argentinian botanist and Professor of Phytogeography from the National University of La Plata	Poaceae	Bt
Zuloagocardamum	Fernando Omar Zuloaga (b.1951), Argentinian botanist and Professor of Phytogeography from the National University of La Plata	Brassicaceae	Bt

== See also ==
- List of plant genus names with etymologies: A–C, D–K, L–P, Q–Z
- List of plant family names with etymologies
