= Marcgravia grandifolia =

Conservation status
- Endangered (IUCN 3.1)

Scientific classification
- Kingdom: Plantae
- Clade: Tracheophytes
- Clade: Angiosperms
- Clade: Eudicots
- Clade: Asterids
- Order: Ericales
- Family: Marcgraviaceae
- Genus: Marcgravia
- Species: M. grandifolia

Binomial name
- Marcgravia grandifolia Sleumer

Species of vine

Marcgravia grandifolia is a species of plant in the Marcgraviaceae family. It is endemic to Ecuador.

== Ecology ==
The plant's natural habitat is subtropical or tropical moist lowland forests.

The green-crowned brilliant hummingbird feeds at the large inflorescences of the Marcgravia grandifolia vine.
