= Marcgravia polyadenia =

Conservation status
- Data Deficient (IUCN 3.1)

Scientific classification
- Kingdom: Plantae
- Clade: Tracheophytes
- Clade: Angiosperms
- Clade: Eudicots
- Clade: Asterids
- Order: Ericales
- Family: Marcgraviaceae
- Genus: Marcgravia
- Species: M. polyadenia

Binomial name
- Marcgravia polyadenia Sleumer

Species of vine

Marcgravia polyadenia is a species of plant in the Marcgraviaceae family. The flowering vine is endemic to Ecuador.

== Ecology ==
The plant's natural habitat is subtropical or tropical moist lowland forests.

The green-crowned brilliant hummingbird feeds at the large inflorescences of the Marcgravia polyadenia vines.
