= N. brasiliensis =

N. brasiliensis may refer to:

- Narcine brasiliensis, a species of electric ray
- Neohebestola brasiliensis, a species of beetle
- Neoterebra brasiliensis, a species of sea snail
- Nippostrongylus brasiliensis, a species of roundworm
- Nocardia brasiliensis, a species of bacteria
- Norantea brasiliensis, a species of flowering plant
