= Marcgravia crassiflora =

Conservation status
- Data Deficient (IUCN 3.1)

Scientific classification
- Kingdom: Plantae
- Clade: Tracheophytes
- Clade: Angiosperms
- Clade: Eudicots
- Clade: Asterids
- Order: Ericales
- Family: Marcgraviaceae
- Genus: Marcgravia
- Species: M. crassiflora

Binomial name
- Marcgravia crassiflora Sleumer

Species of flowering plant

Marcgravia crassiflora is a species of flowering plant in the Marcgraviaceae family. It is endemic to Ecuador.

== Ecology ==
The plant's natural habitat is subtropical or tropical moist montane areas of the Andes local ranges.

The green-crowned brilliant hummingbird feeds at the large inflorescences of the Marcgravia crassiflora vines.
