= Cyperus confertus =

West Indian flatsedge

Scientific classification
- Kingdom: Plantae
- Clade: Tracheophytes
- Clade: Angiosperms
- Clade: Monocots
- Clade: Commelinids
- Order: Poales
- Family: Cyperaceae
- Genus: Cyperus
- Species: C. confertus

Binomial name
- Cyperus confertus Sw.

Synonyms
- Mariscus confertus

Species of sedge

Cyperus confertus, also called the West Indian flatsedge is a species of sedge that is native to northern parts of South America.

== See also ==
- List of Cyperus species
