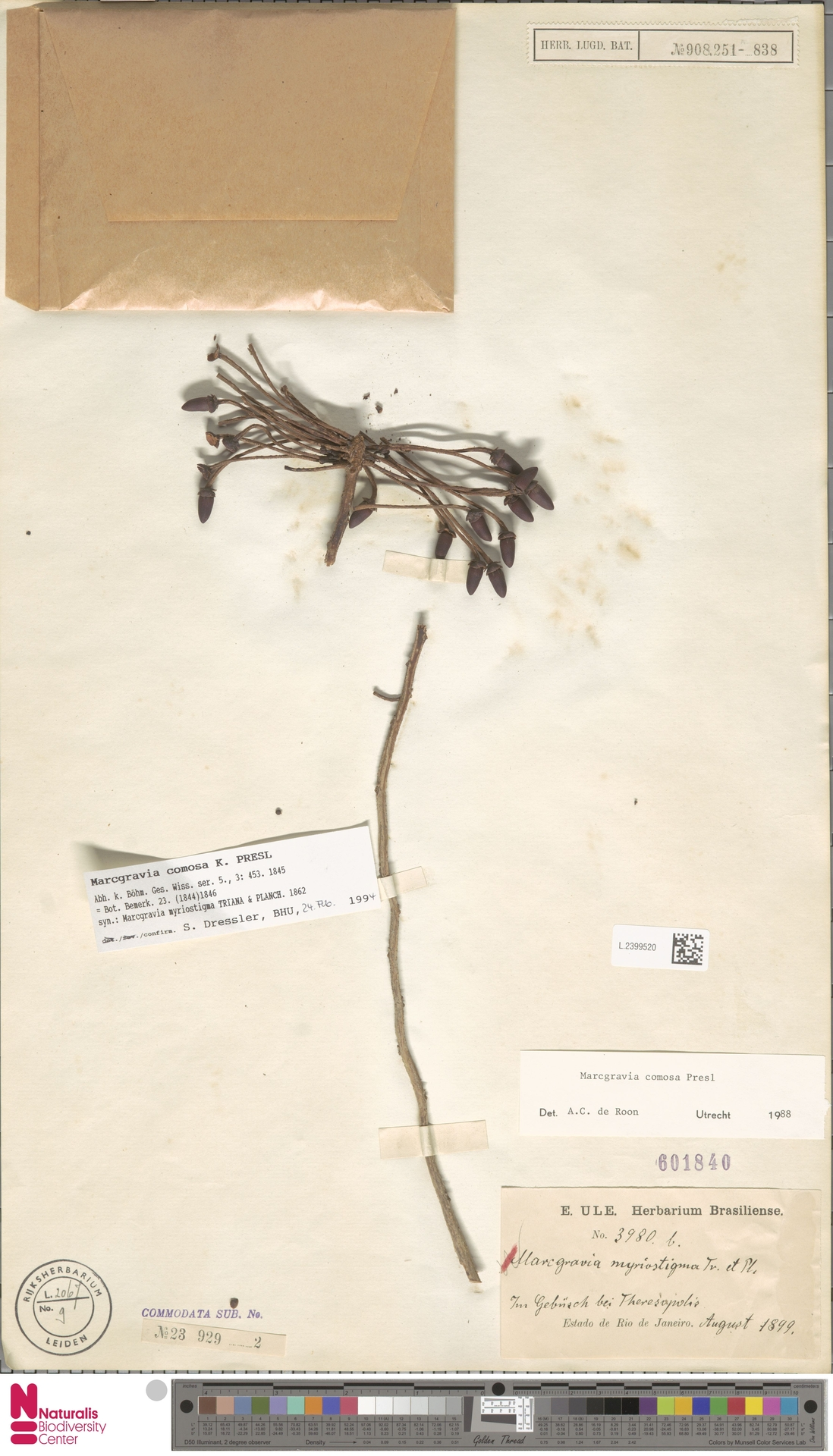

Scientific classification
- Kingdom: Plantae
- Clade: Embryophytes
- Clade: Tracheophytes
- Clade: Spermatophytes
- Clade: Angiosperms
- Clade: Eudicots
- Clade: Asterids
- Order: Ericales
- Family: Marcgraviaceae
- Genus: Marcgravia
- Species: M. comosa

Binomial name
- Marcgravia comosa C.Presl

= Marcgravia comosa =

Species of plant native to Brazil

Marcgravia comosa is a species of plant native to the Atlantic Forest, in Brazil.
