= Marcgraviastrum sodiroi =

Conservation status
- Endangered (IUCN 3.1)

Scientific classification
- Kingdom: Plantae
- Clade: Tracheophytes
- Clade: Angiosperms
- Clade: Eudicots
- Clade: Asterids
- Order: Ericales
- Family: Marcgraviaceae
- Genus: Marcgraviastrum
- Species: M. sodiroi

Binomial name
- Marcgraviastrum sodiroi (Gilg) Bedell ex S.Dressler

Synonyms
- Norantea sodiroi Gilg in Beibl. Bot. Jahrb. Syst. 78: 14 (1904)

Species of flowering plant

Marcgraviastrum sodiroi is a species of plant in the Marcgraviaceae family endemic to Colombia and Ecuador.

Its natural habitats are subtropical or tropical moist lowland forests and subtropical or tropical moist montane forests.

It was first published in Monogr. Syst. Bot. Missouri Bot. Gard. 75: 955 in 1999.

The specific epithet of sodiroi refers to Luis Sodiro (1836–1909), who was an Italian Jesuit priest and a field botanist, who collected many plants in Ecuador.
