= Marcgraviastrum gigantophyllum =

Conservation status
- Vulnerable (IUCN 3.1)

Scientific classification
- Kingdom: Plantae
- Clade: Tracheophytes
- Clade: Angiosperms
- Clade: Eudicots
- Clade: Asterids
- Order: Ericales
- Family: Marcgraviaceae
- Genus: Marcgraviastrum
- Species: M. gigantophyllum

Binomial name
- Marcgraviastrum gigantophyllum (Gilg) Bedell ex S.Dressler

Synonyms
- Norantea gigantophylla Gilg

Species of flowering plant

Marcgraviastrum gigantophyllum is a species of flowering plant in the family Marcgraviaceae. It is endemic to Ecuador. The vine's natural habitat is subtropical or tropical moist montane areas of the Andes Ecuadorian ranges.
