= Cyperus filiformis =

Scientific classification
- Kingdom: Plantae
- Clade: Tracheophytes
- Clade: Angiosperms
- Clade: Monocots
- Clade: Commelinids
- Order: Poales
- Family: Cyperaceae
- Genus: Cyperus
- Species: C. filiformis

Binomial name
- Cyperus filiformis Sw., 1788

Species of sedge

Cyperus filiformis is a species of sedge that is native to northern parts of South America, southern parts of North America and parts of the Caribbean.

== See also ==
- List of Cyperus species
