= Marcgravia caudata =

Scientific classification
- Kingdom: Plantae
- Clade: Tracheophytes
- Clade: Angiosperms
- Clade: Eudicots
- Clade: Asterids
- Order: Ericales
- Family: Marcgraviaceae
- Genus: Marcgravia
- Species: M. caudata

Binomial name
- Marcgravia caudata Triana & Planch.

Plant species

Marcgravia caudata is a species of Marcgravia native to Bolivia. It belongs to Marcgraviaceae family.
