= Marcgravia dressleri =

Scientific classification
- Kingdom: Plantae
- Clade: Tracheophytes
- Clade: Angiosperms
- Clade: Eudicots
- Clade: Asterids
- Order: Ericales
- Family: Marcgraviaceae
- Genus: Marcgravia
- Species: M. dressleri

Binomial name
- Marcgravia dressleri Gir.-Cañas

Species of Marcgravia

Marcgravia dressleri is a species of Marcgravia. Marcgravia dressleri is native to Colombia.
