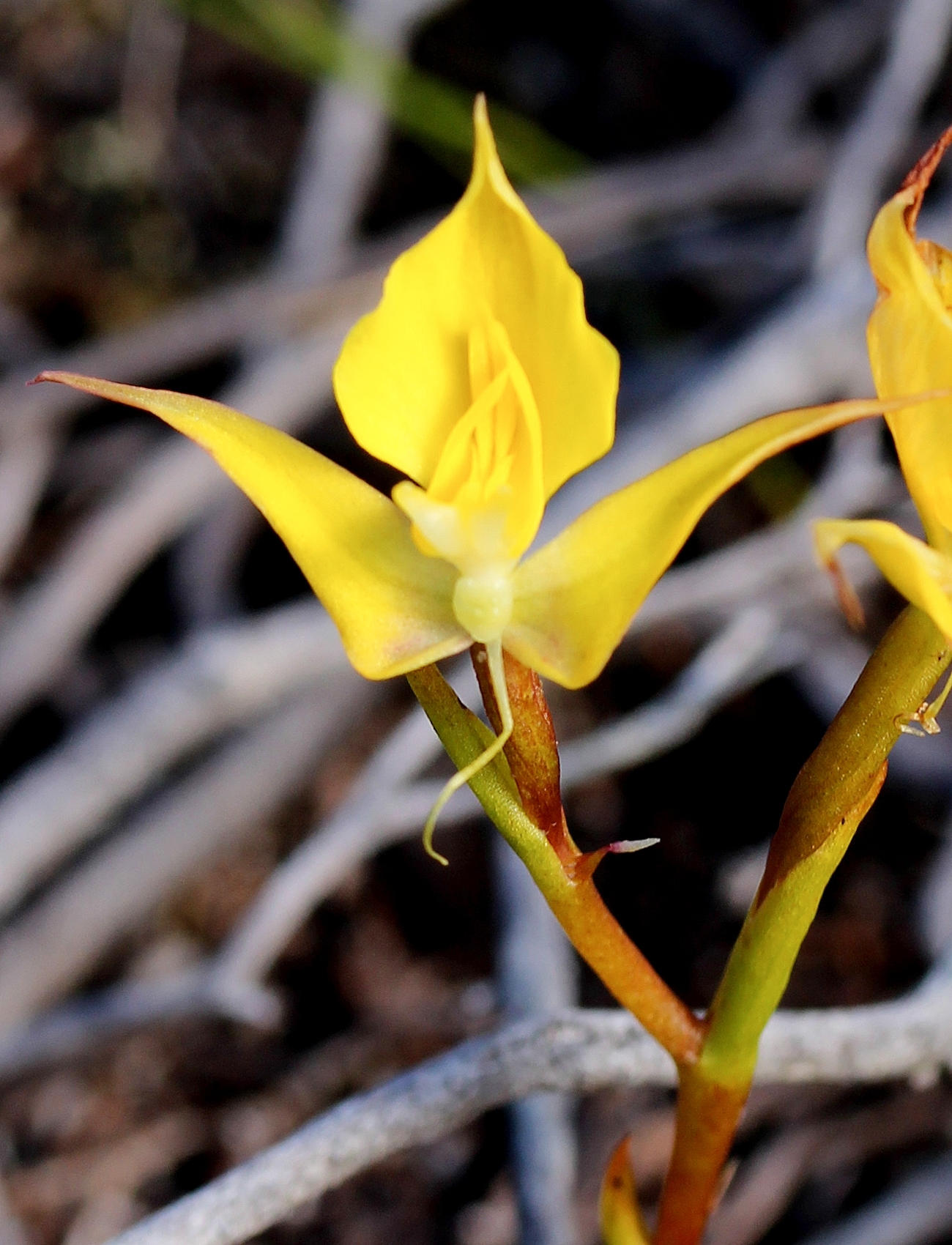

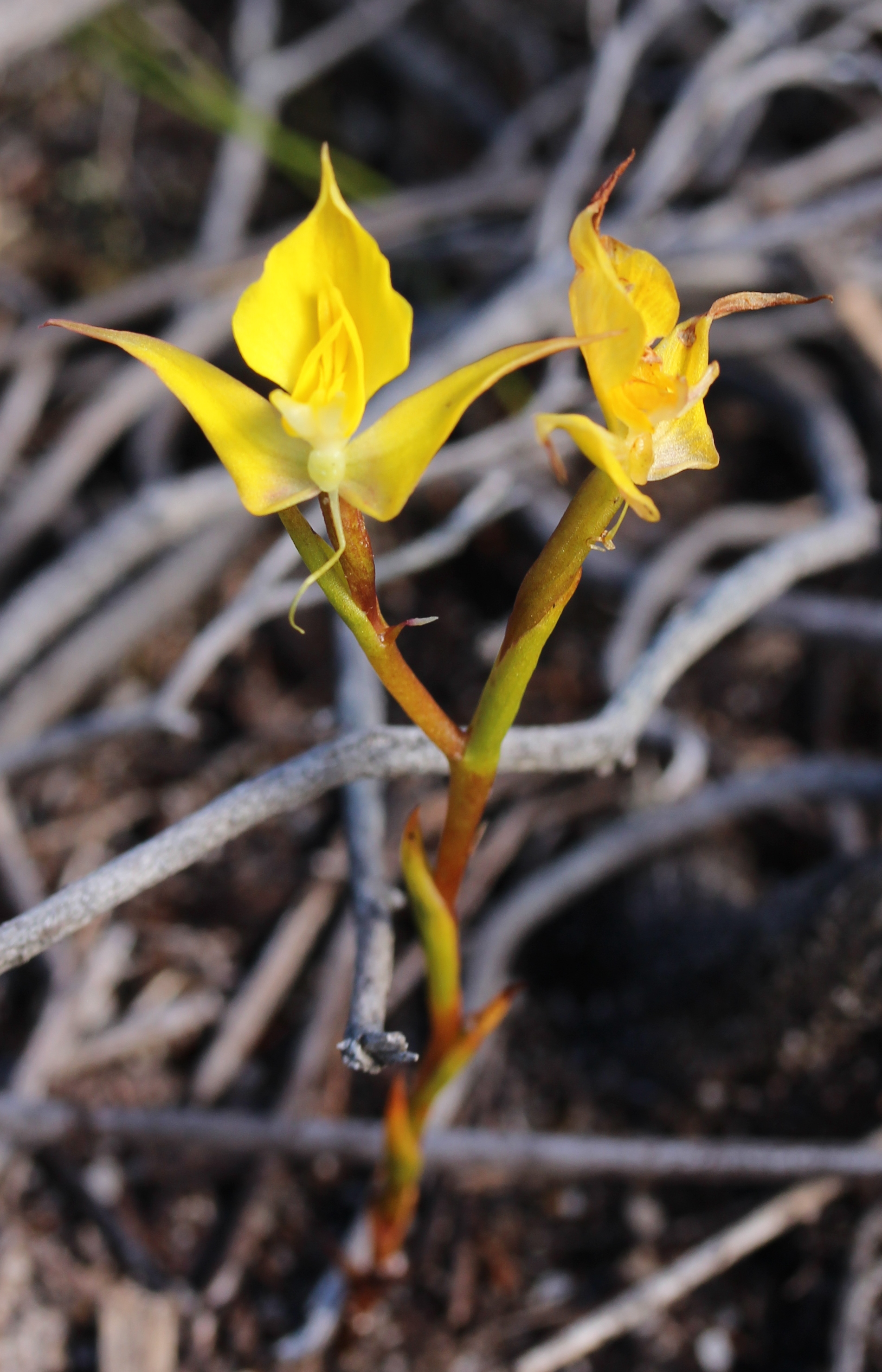

Scientific classification
- Kingdom: Plantae
- Clade: Tracheophytes
- Clade: Angiosperms
- Clade: Monocots
- Order: Asparagales
- Family: Orchidaceae
- Subfamily: Orchidoideae
- Genus: Disa
- Species: D. tenuifolia

Binomial name
- Disa tenuifolia Sw., (1800)

Synonyms
- Disa lutea H.P.Linder; Disa patens (L.f.) Thunb.; Ophrys patens L.f.; Penthea patens (L.f.) Lindl.; Serapias patens (L.f.) Thunb.

= Disa tenuifolia =

Species of flowering plant

Disa tenuifolia, the yellow disa, is a perennial plant and geophyte belonging to the genus Disa and part of the fynbos. The plant is endemic to the Western Cape.
