= Ruyschia clusiifolia =

Scientific classification
- Kingdom: Plantae
- Clade: Tracheophytes
- Clade: Angiosperms
- Clade: Eudicots
- Clade: Asterids
- Order: Ericales
- Family: Marcgraviaceae
- Genus: Ruyschia
- Species: R. clusiifolia

Binomial name
- Ruyschia clusiifolia Jacq.

Species of flowering plant

Ruyschia clusiifolia is a species of flowering plant in the family Marcgraviaceae. The species is endemic to the Lesser Antilles.
