= Schwartzia =

Schwartzia may refer to:

- Schwartzia (plant), a genus of plants in the family Marcgraviaceae
- Schwartzia (bacterium), a genus of bacteria in the order Selenomonadales
- Schwartzia, a genus of gastropods in the family Rissoidae, synonym of Rissoa
- Schwartzia, a genus of butterflies in the family Nymphalidae, synonym of Morpho
