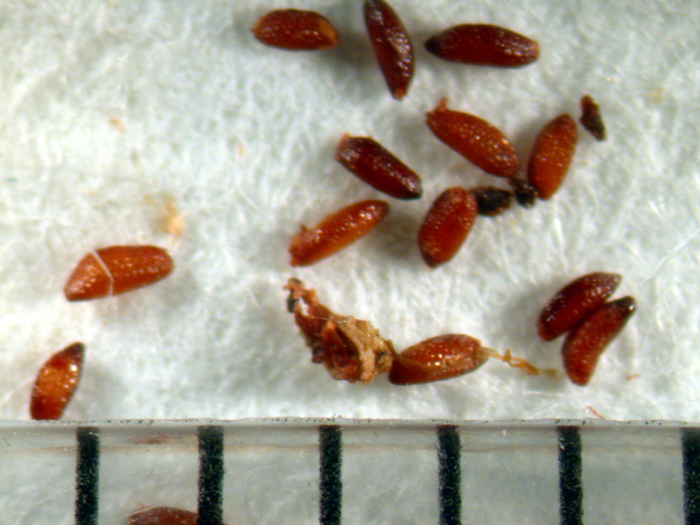

Scientific classification
- Kingdom: Plantae
- Clade: Tracheophytes
- Clade: Angiosperms
- Clade: Eudicots
- Clade: Asterids
- Order: Ericales
- Family: Marcgraviaceae
- Genus: Marcgravia
- Species: M. pittieri

Binomial name
- Marcgravia pittieri Gilg

Synonyms
- Marcgravia guatemalensis Standl.

= Marcgravia pittieri =

Species of flowering plant

Marcgravia pittieri is a species of flowering plant in the family Marcgraviaceae. It is visited by Thomas's nectar bat.
