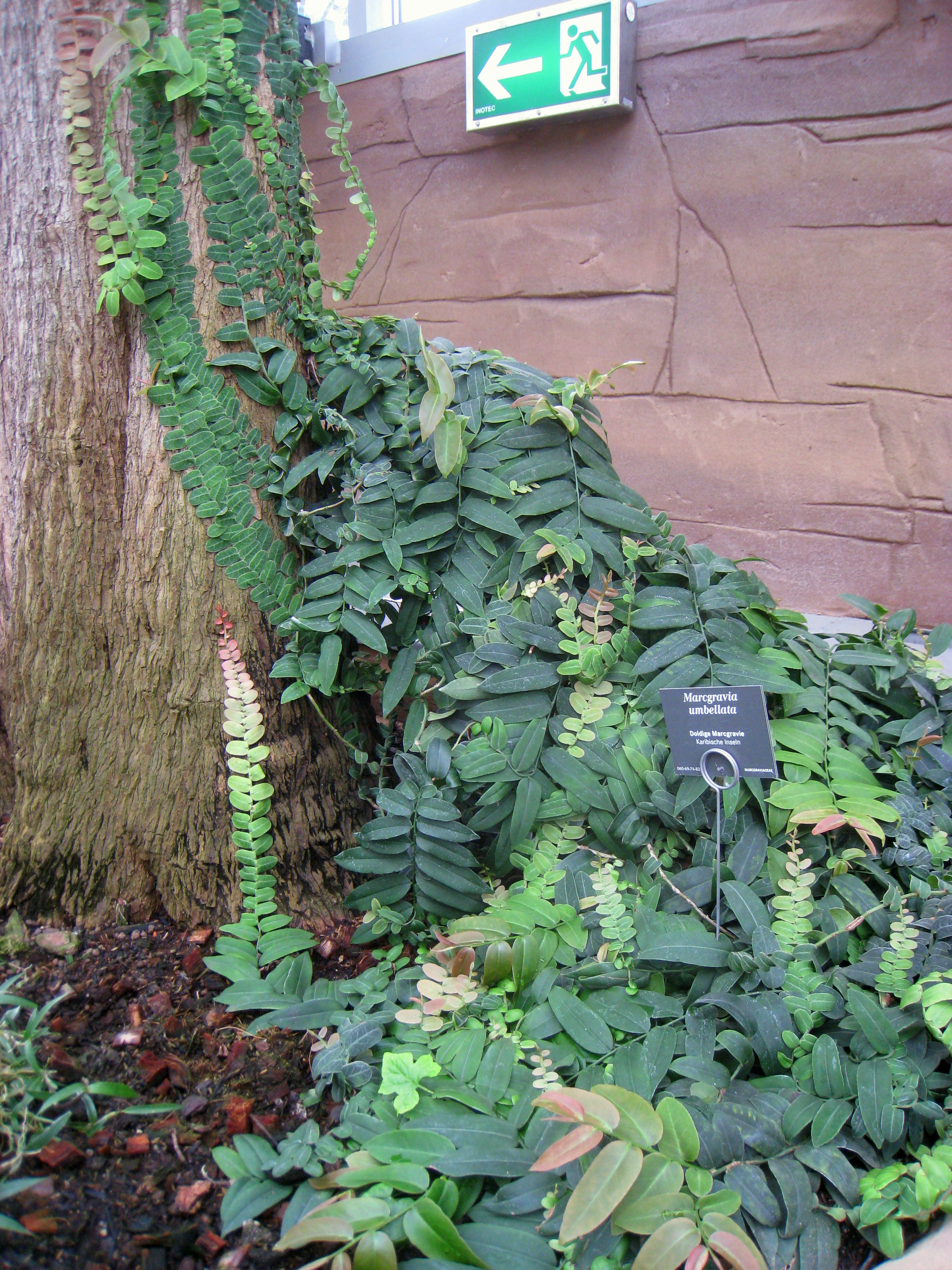

Scientific classification
- Kingdom: Plantae
- Clade: Tracheophytes
- Clade: Angiosperms
- Clade: Eudicots
- Clade: Asterids
- Order: Ericales
- Family: Marcgraviaceae
- Genus: Marcgravia
- Species: M. umbellata

Binomial name
- Marcgravia umbellata L.

= Marcgravia umbellata =

Species of vine

Marcgravia umbellata, also called monkey paws, is a species of flowering vine in the family Marcgraviaceae. It is native to the Lesser Antilles islands in the eastern Caribbean and Anguilla. Marcgravia umbellata was the first member of the marcgraviaceae family to be described in modern botanical literature.
