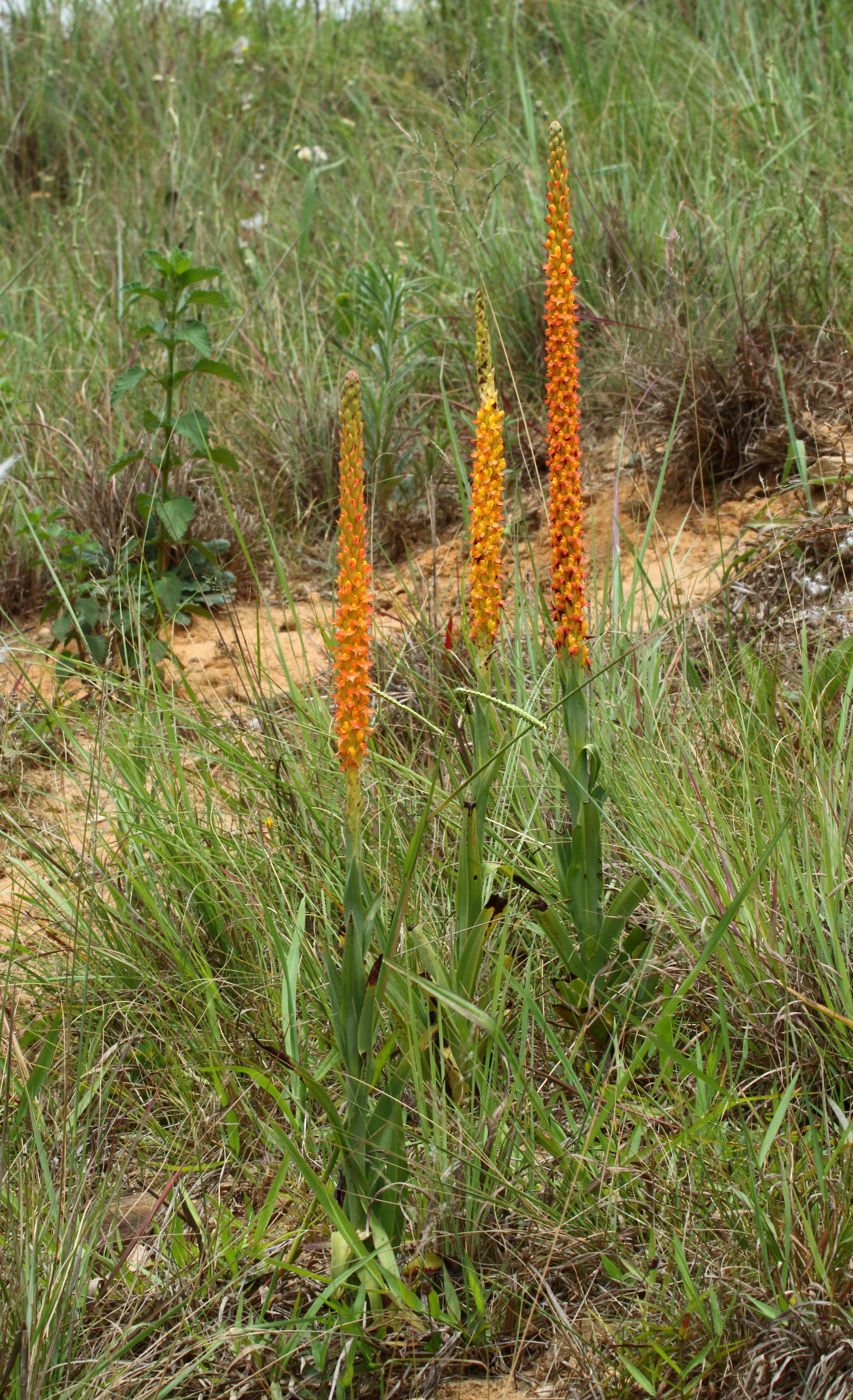

Scientific classification
- Kingdom: Plantae
- Clade: Tracheophytes
- Clade: Angiosperms
- Clade: Monocots
- Order: Asparagales
- Family: Orchidaceae
- Subfamily: Orchidoideae
- Genus: Disa
- Species: D. chrysostachya

Binomial name
- Disa chrysostachya Sw.

Synonyms
- Disa gracilis Lindl.

= Disa chrysostachya =

Species of flowering plant

Disa chrysostachya, the torch orchid, is a perennial plant and geophyte belonging to the genus Disa. The plant is native to Eswatini, KwaZulu-Natal, Lesotho, Limpopo, Mpumalanga, Eastern Cape and the Free State.
