= Cyperus tenuis =

Conservation status
- Least Concern (IUCN 3.1)

Scientific classification
- Kingdom: Plantae
- Clade: Tracheophytes
- Clade: Angiosperms
- Clade: Monocots
- Clade: Commelinids
- Order: Poales
- Family: Cyperaceae
- Genus: Cyperus
- Species: C. tenuis

Binomial name
- Cyperus tenuis Sw., 1788

Species of sedge

Cyperus tatandaensis is a species of sedge that is native to parts of Africa, South America and Central America.

== See also ==
- List of Cyperus species
