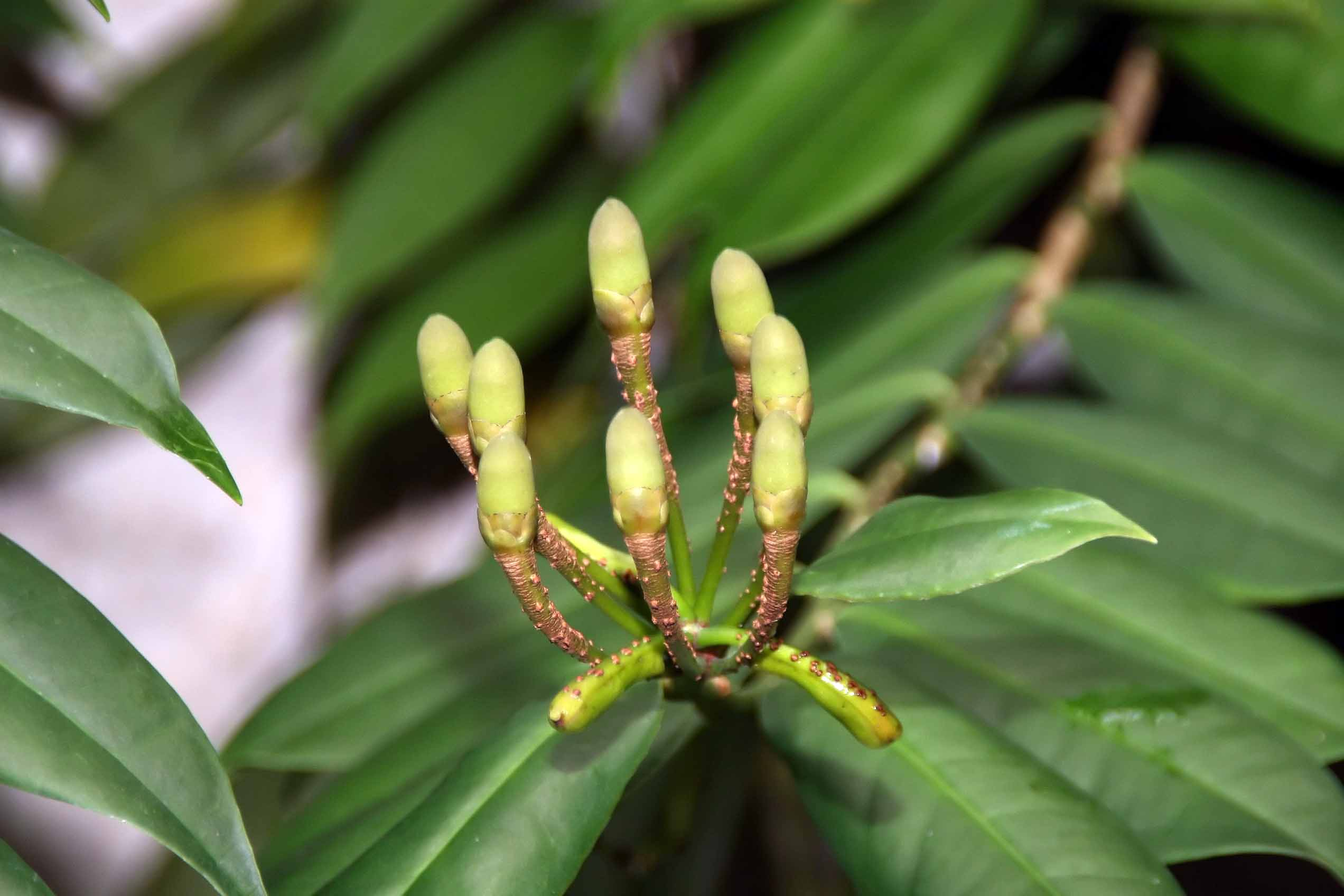

Scientific classification
- Kingdom: Plantae
- Clade: Tracheophytes
- Clade: Angiosperms
- Clade: Eudicots
- Clade: Asterids
- Order: Ericales
- Family: Marcgraviaceae
- Genus: Marcgravia
- Species: M. rectiflora

Binomial name
- Marcgravia rectiflora Triana & Planch.

= Marcgravia rectiflora =

Species of plant

Marcgravia rectiflora is a plant species native to Peru and Central America.

== Native locations ==
- Columbia
- Cuba
- Dominican Republic
- Guatemala
- Haiti
- Honduras
- Leeward is.
- Peru
- Puerto Rico
