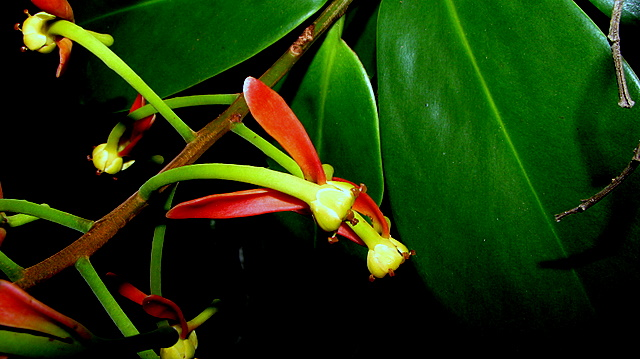
- Souroubea guianensis

Scientific classification
- Kingdom: Plantae
- Clade: Tracheophytes
- Clade: Angiosperms
- Clade: Eudicots
- Clade: Asterids
- Order: Ericales
- Family: Marcgraviaceae
- Subfamily: Noranteoideae
- Genus: Souroubea; Aubl.

Species
- See text

Synonyms
- List: Loghania Scop.; Surubea J.St.-Hil.

= Souroubea =

Genus of Marcgraviaceae plants

Souroubea is a genus of flowering plants in the family Marcgraviaceae, native to southern Mexico, Central America, Trinidad, and northern South America. Some species are psychophilous (pollinated by butterflies in the day), and some are sphingophilous (pollinated by moths at night).

== Species ==
Currently accepted species include:

- Souroubea bicolor (Benth.) de Roon
- Souroubea corallina (Mart.) de Roon
- Souroubea crassipes (Triana & Planch.) Wittm.
- Souroubea crassipetala de Roon
- Souroubea dasystachya Gilg & Werderm.
- Souroubea didyma Gilg
- Souroubea exauriculata Delpino
- Souroubea fragilis de Roon
- Souroubea gilgii V.A.Richt.
- Souroubea guianensis Aubl.
- Souroubea intermedia de Roon
- Souroubea loczyi (V.A.Richt.) de Roon
- Souroubea pachyphylla Gilg
- Souroubea peruviana Gilg
- Souroubea platyadenia (Gilg) de Roon
- Souroubea stichadenia de Roon
- Souroubea sympetala Gilg
- Souroubea vallicola Woodson ex de Roon
- Souroubea venosa Schery
