= Marcgraviastrum =

Scientific classification
- Kingdom: Plantae
- Clade: Tracheophytes
- Clade: Angiosperms
- Clade: Eudicots
- Clade: Asterids
- Order: Ericales
- Family: Marcgraviaceae
- Genus: Marcgraviastrum (Wittm. ex Szyszył.) de Roon & S.Dressler

Species
- See text

Genus of flowering plants

Marcgraviastrum is a flowering plant genus in the family Marcgraviaceae.

Species include:

- Marcgraviastrum gigantophyllum
- Marcgraviastrum sodiroi
