= Neohebestola luchopegnai =

Scientific classification
- Kingdom: Animalia
- Phylum: Arthropoda
- Class: Insecta
- Order: Coleoptera
- Suborder: Polyphaga
- Infraorder: Cucujiformia
- Family: Cerambycidae
- Genus: Neohebestola
- Species: N. luchopegnai

Binomial name
- Neohebestola luchopegnai Martins & Galileo, 1989

Species of beetle

Neohebestola luchopegnai is a species of beetle in the family Cerambycidae. It was described by Martins and Galileo in 1989. It is known from Chile.
