= Neohebestola vitticollis =

Scientific classification
- Kingdom: Animalia
- Phylum: Arthropoda
- Class: Insecta
- Order: Coleoptera
- Suborder: Polyphaga
- Infraorder: Cucujiformia
- Family: Cerambycidae
- Genus: Neohebestola
- Species: N. vitticollis

Binomial name
- Neohebestola vitticollis (Blanchard in Gay, 1851)

Species of beetle

Neohebestola vitticollis is a species of beetle in the family Cerambycidae. It was described by Blanchard in 1851. It is known from Argentina and Chile.
