= Neohebestola concolor =

Scientific classification
- Kingdom: Animalia
- Phylum: Arthropoda
- Class: Insecta
- Order: Coleoptera
- Suborder: Polyphaga
- Infraorder: Cucujiformia
- Family: Cerambycidae
- Genus: Neohebestola
- Species: N. concolor

Binomial name
- Neohebestola concolor (Fabricius, 1798)

Species of beetle

Neohebestola concolor is a species of beetle in the family Cerambycidae. It was described by Johan Christian Fabricius in 1798.
