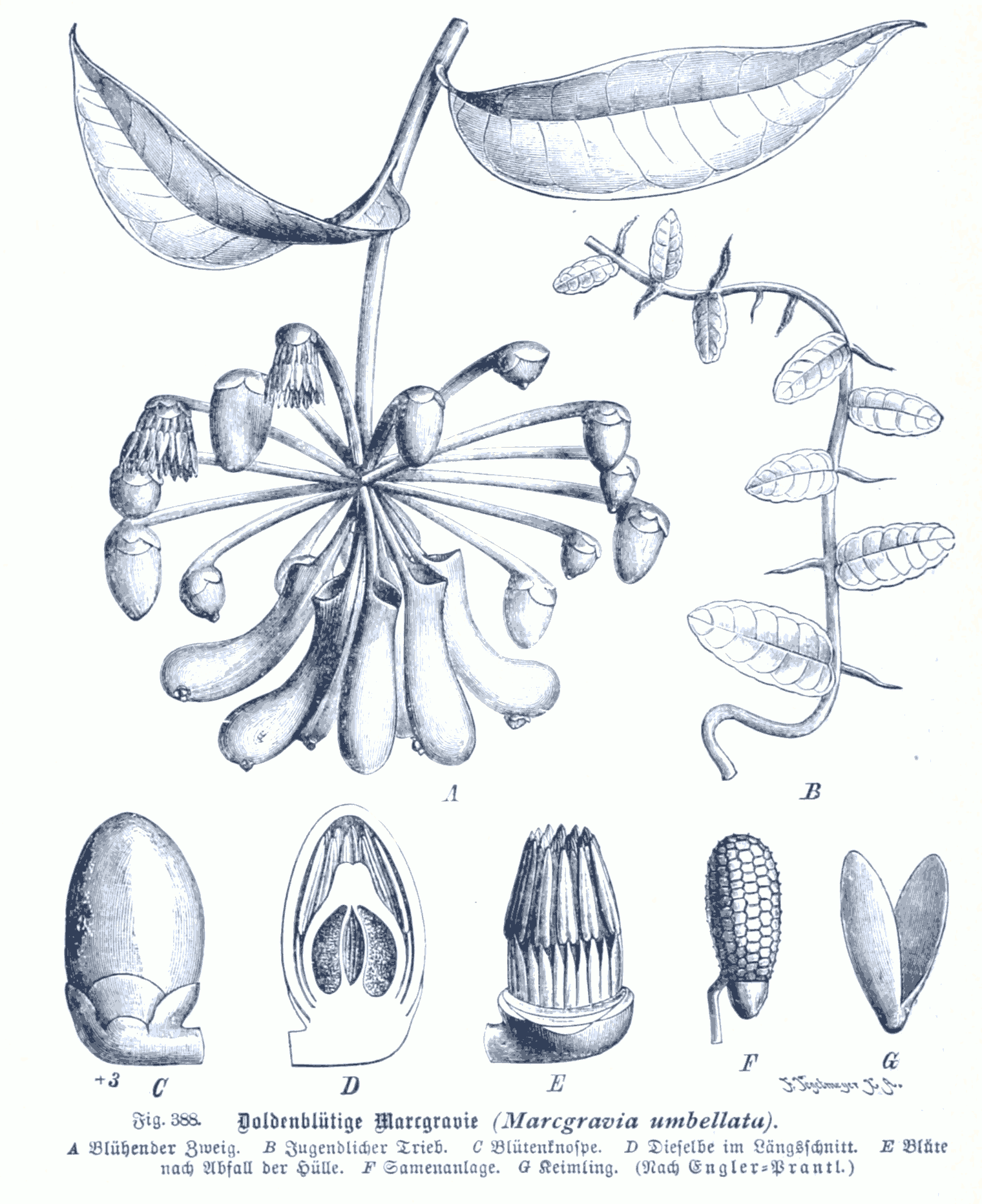
- Marcgravia umbellata

Scientific classification
- Kingdom: Plantae
- Clade: Tracheophytes
- Clade: Angiosperms
- Clade: Eudicots
- Clade: Asterids
- Order: Ericales
- Family: Marcgraviaceae
- Genus: Marcgravia; L.

Type species
- Marcgravia umbellata L.

= Marcgravia =

Genus of flowering plants

Marcgravia is a genus of plants in the family Marcgraviaceae native to the region spanning from Mexico to tropical South America. It is commonly eaten by the dwarf little fruit bat. The genus is named in memory of the German naturalist Georg Marcgraf. The plant is visited by Thomas's nectar bat.

== Description ==
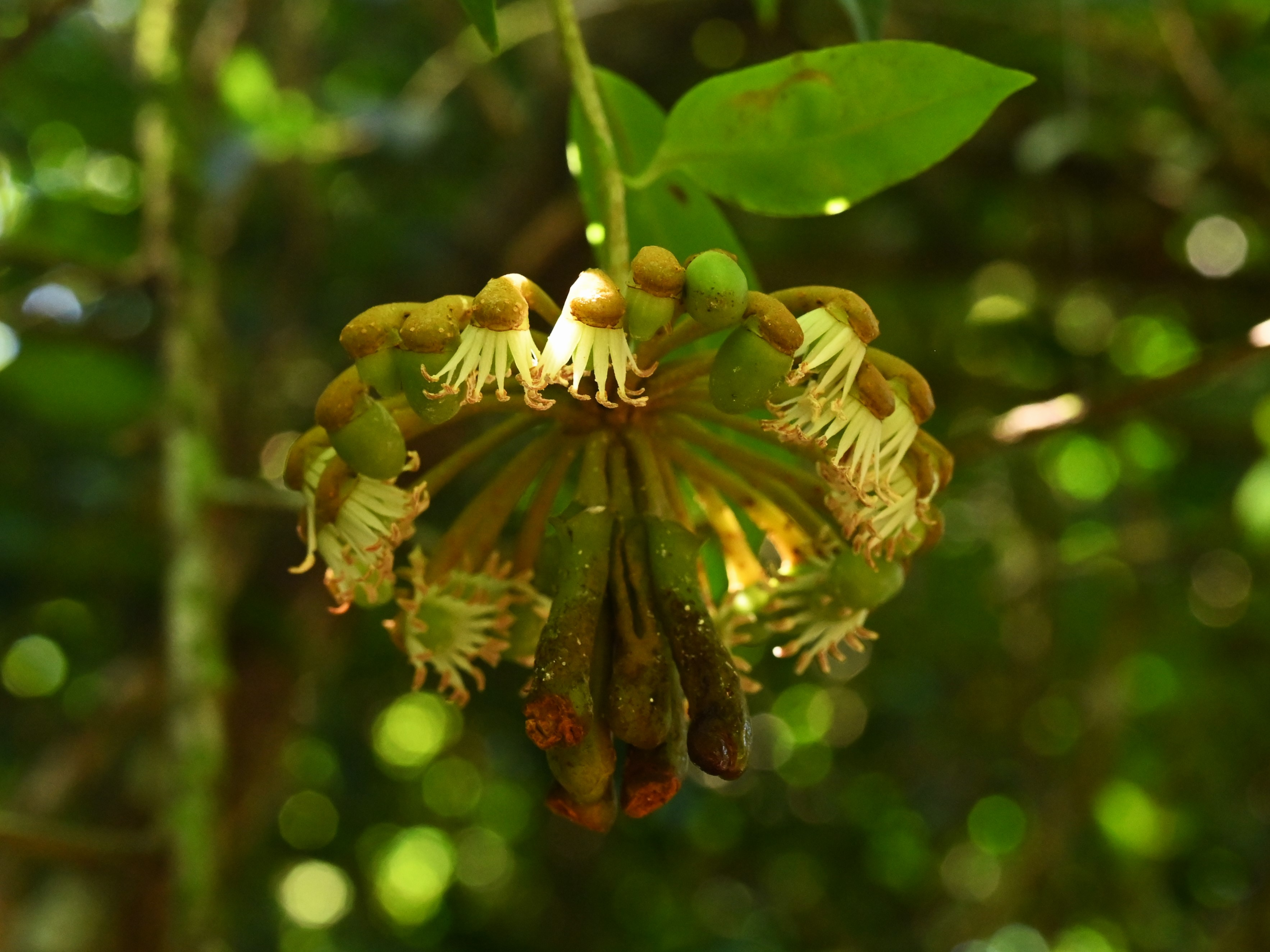
Marcgravia umbellata inflorescence

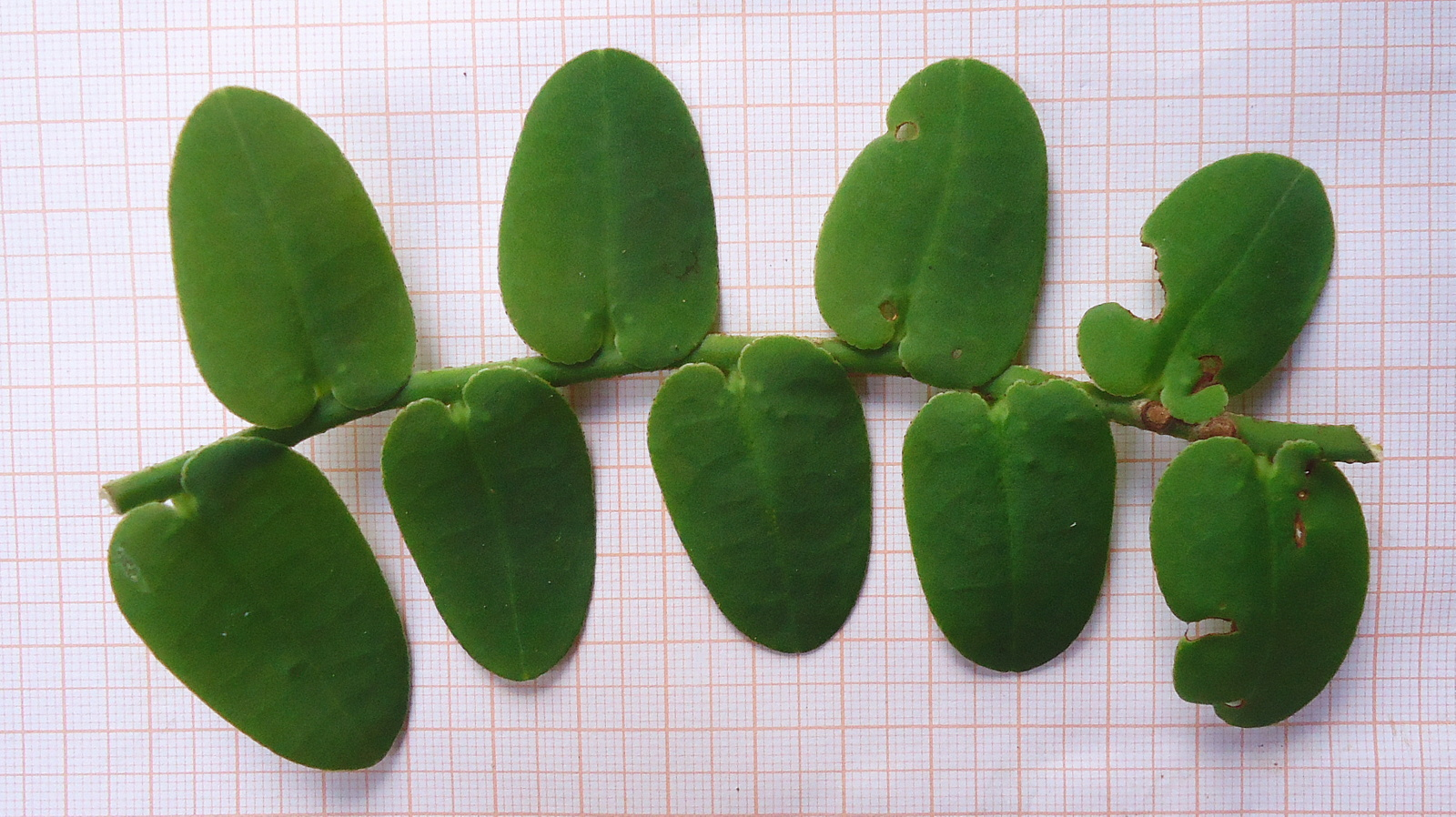
Marcgravia coriacea branch

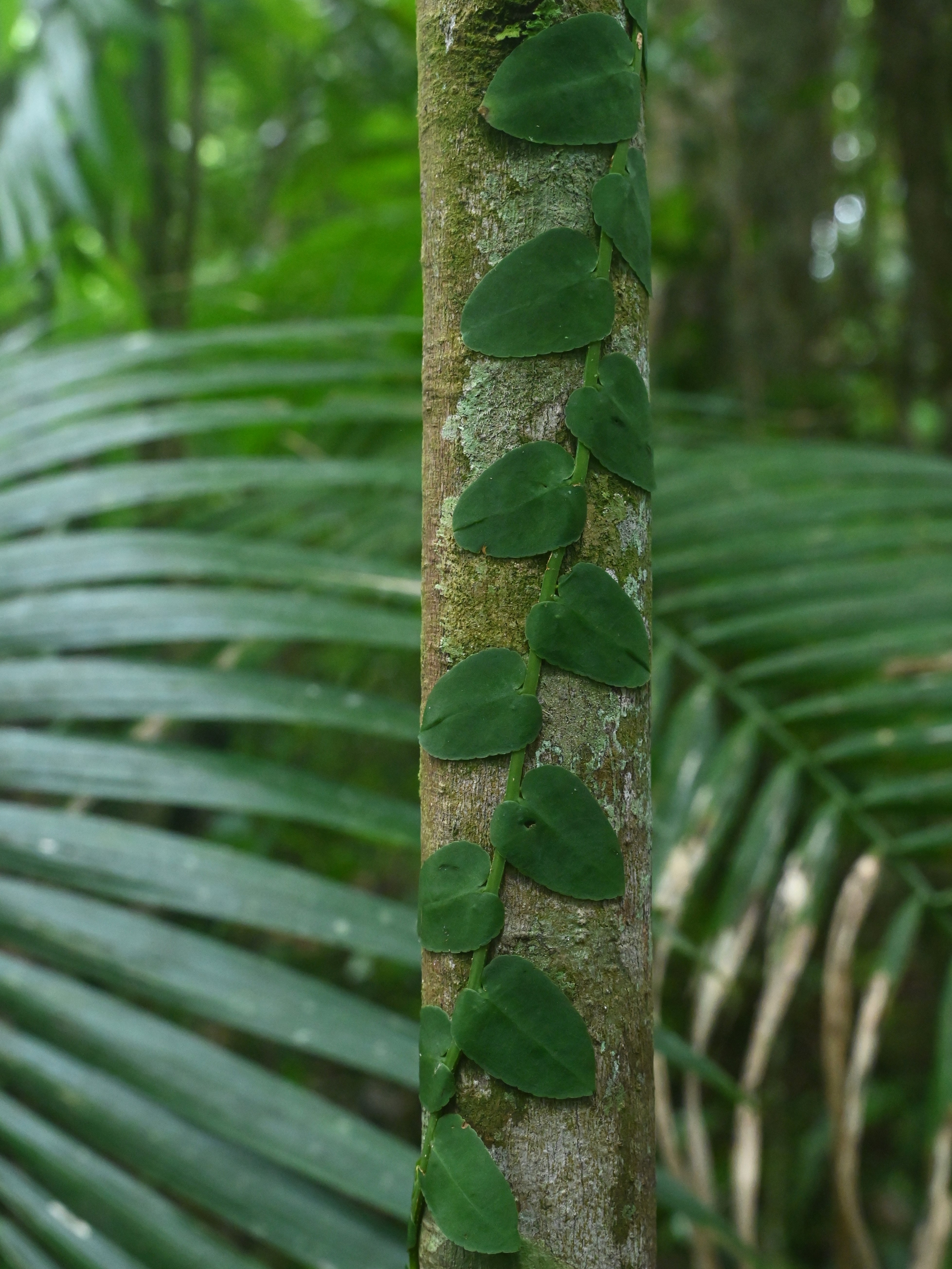
Sterile Marcgravia umbellata branch climbing up a tree

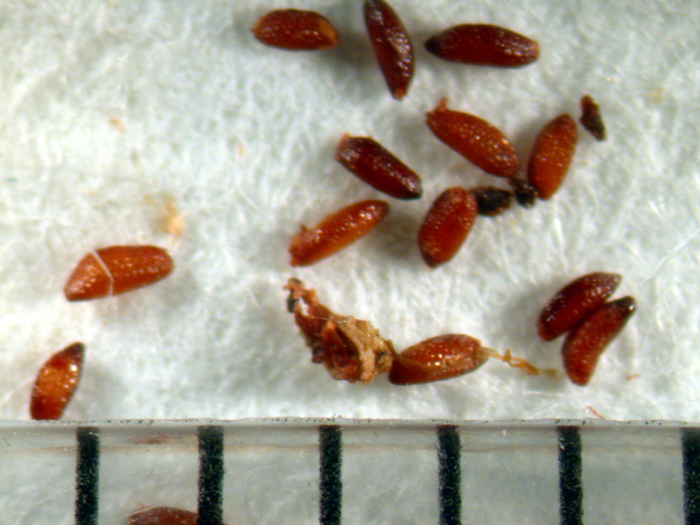
Seeds of Marcgravia pittieri

=== Vegetative characteristics ===
Marcgravia are vines or climbing shrubs. Marcgravia is classified as a sub-parasitical shrub. The branches are dimorphic. The sterile branches creep or climb. The pendulous fertile branches are terete and do not bear roots.

=== Generative characteristics ===
The terminal, umbelliform, partly sterile inflorescence is composed of a ring of fertile flowers, as well as a number of nectaries derived from bracts, which are fused with sterile flowers. The fertile flowers have four sepals and four petals.

=== Cytology ===
The chromosome count is 2n = 36, 38, 62–64.

== Taxonomy ==
It was described by Carl Linnaeus in 1753 with Marcgravia umbellata L. as the type species.

=== Etymology ===
The genus name Marcgravia honours the German naturalist and astronomer Georg Markgraf.

=== Species ===
- Marcgravia acuminata
- Marcgravia affinis
- Marcgravia ampulligera
- Marcgravia angustifolia
- Marcgravia atropunctata
- Marcgravia brachysepala
- Marcgravia brittoniana
- Marcgravia brownei
- Marcgravia cacabifera
- Marcgravia calcicola
- Marcgravia caudata
- Marcgravia comosa
- Marcgravia cordachida
- Marcgravia cordachidia
- Marcgravia coriacea
- Marcgravia corumbensis
- Marcgravia crassicostata
- Marcgravia crassiflora
- Marcgravia crenata
- Marcgravia cuneifolia
- Marcgravia cuspidata
- Marcgravia cuyuniensis
- Marcgravia cyrtogastra
- Marcgravia cyrtonota
- Marcgravia dasyantha
- Marcgravia domingensis
- Marcgravia dressleri
- Marcgravia dubia
- Marcgravia eichleriana
- Marcgravia elegans
- Marcgravia evenia
- Marcgravia flagellaris
- Marcgravia fosbergiana
- Marcgravia gentlei
- Marcgravia goudotiana
- Marcgravia gracilis
- Marcgravia grandifolia
- Marcgravia guatemalensis
- Marcgravia hartii
- Marcgravia helverseniana
- Marcgravia leticiana
- Marcgravia lineolata
- Marcgravia longifolia
- Marcgravia macrocalyptra
- Marcgravia macrocarpa
- Marcgravia macrophylla
- Marcgravia magnibracteata
- Marcgravia maguirei
- Marcgravia membranacea
- Marcgravia mexicana
- Marcgravia micrantha
- Marcgravia monogyna
- Marcgravia myriostigma
- Marcgravia nepenthoides
- Marcgravia nervosa
- Marcgravia neurophylla
- Marcgravia nubicola
- Marcgravia oblongifolia
- Marcgravia obovata
- Marcgravia octandra
- Marcgravia oligandra
- Marcgravia panamensis
- Marcgravia paradoxa
- Marcgravia parviflora
- Marcgravia patellulifera
- Marcgravia peduncularis
- Marcgravia pedunculosa
- Marcgravia pentandra
- Marcgravia picta
- Marcgravia pittieri
- Marcgravia polyadenia
- Marcgravia polyantha
- Marcgravia punctifolia
- Marcgravia purpurea
- Marcgravia rectiflora
- Marcgravia roonii
- Marcgravia roraimae
- Marcgravia roraimensis
- Marcgravia rubra
- Marcgravia salicifolia
- Marcgravia schippii
- Marcgravia serrae
- Marcgravia sintenisii
- Marcgravia sororopaniana
- Marcgravia spiciflora
- Marcgravia sprucei
- Marcgravia stenonectaria
- Marcgravia steyermarkii
- Marcgravia stonei
- Marcgravia strenua
- Marcgravia subcaudata
- Marcgravia subcordata
- Marcgravia tobagensis
- Marcgravia tonduzii
- Marcgravia trianae
- Marcgravia trinitatis
- Marcgravia umbellata
- Marcgravia urophylla
- Marcgravia waferi
- Marcgravia weberbaueri
- Marcgravia williamsii
- Marcgravia wittmackiana
- Marcgravia wrightii
- Marcgravia yukunarum
- Marcgravia zonopunctata

== Distribution ==
It is native to Belize, Bolivia, Brazil, Central American Pacific Islands, Colombia, Costa Rica, Cuba, Dominican Republic, Ecuador, French Guiana, Guatemala, Guyana, Haiti, Honduras, Jamaica, Leeward Islands, Mexico, Nicaragua, Panamá, Peru, Puerto Rico, Suriname, Trinidad-Tobago, Venezuela, and to the Windward Islands.

== Ecology ==
The flowers are bat-pollinated.

== Use ==
In Ecuador and Peru the fruits are used as food and the sap is used as a drink.
