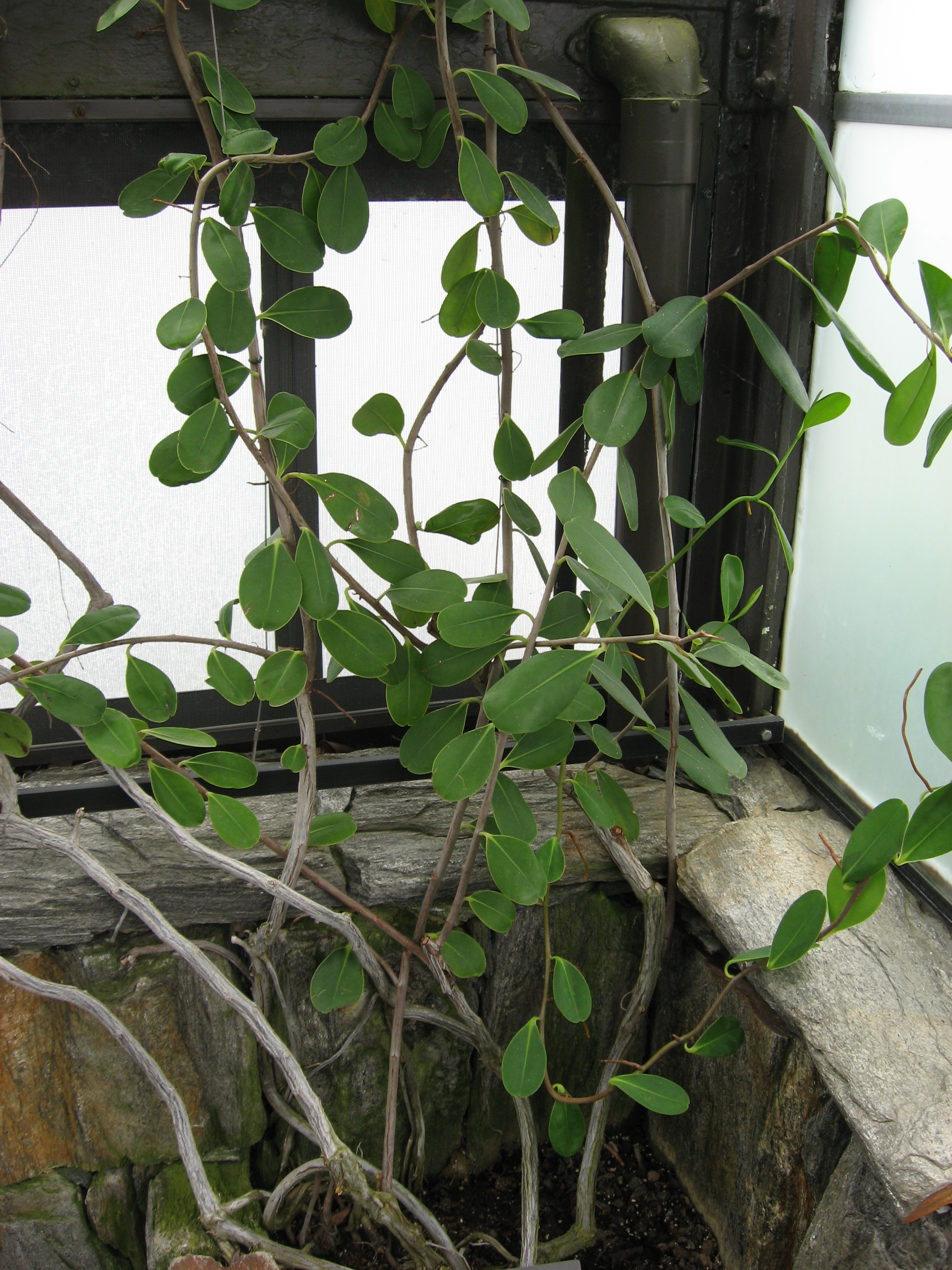

Scientific classification
- Kingdom: Plantae
- Clade: Tracheophytes
- Clade: Angiosperms
- Clade: Eudicots
- Clade: Asterids
- Order: Ericales
- Family: Marcgraviaceae
- Genus: Norantea
- Species: N. brasiliensis

Binomial name
- Norantea brasiliensis Choisy

= Norantea brasiliensis =

Species of flowering plant

Norantea brasiliensis is a species of flowering plant in the Marcgraviaceae family. It is a vine native to Brazil.
