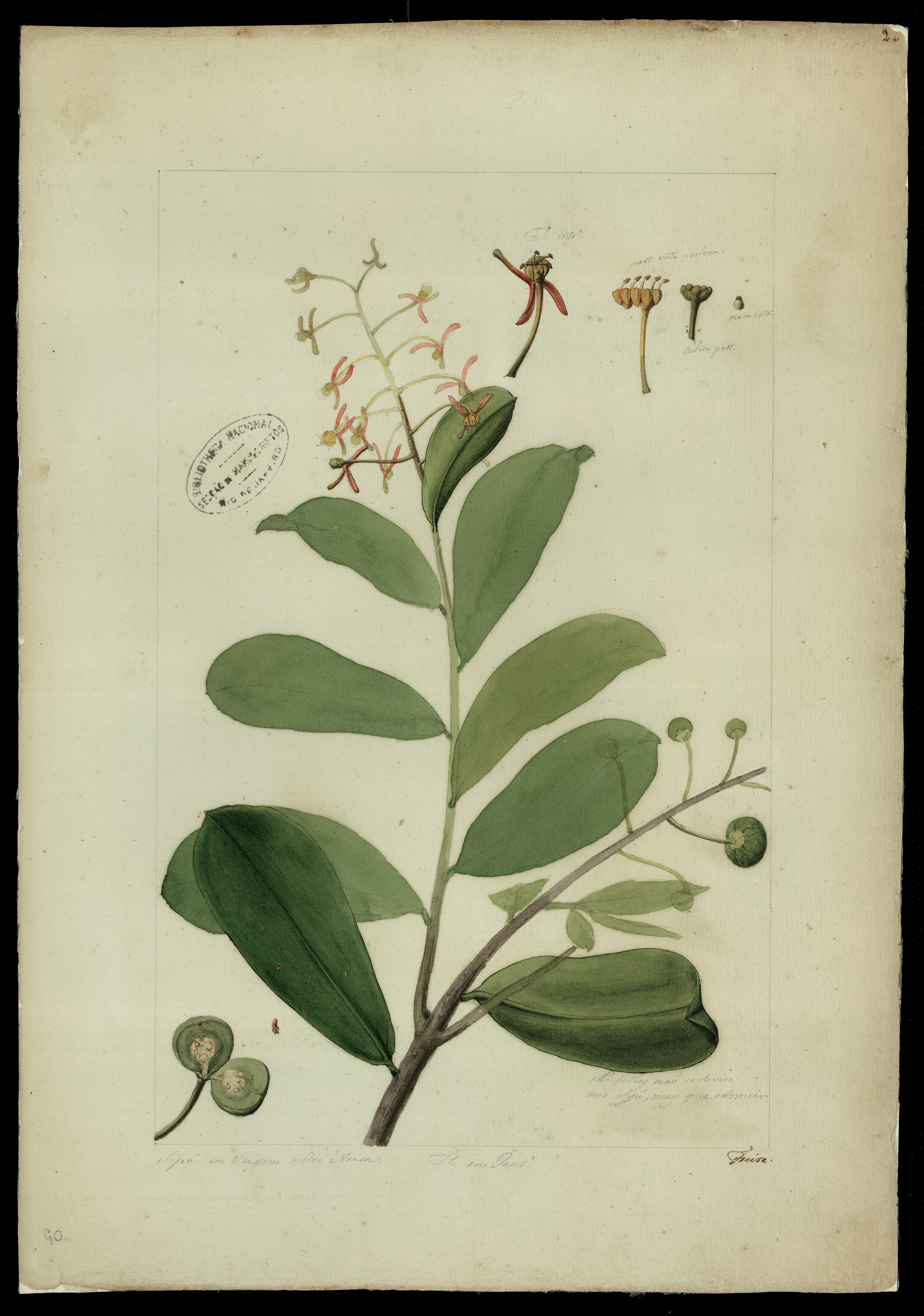
- A watercolour painting depicting a Ruyschia plant

Scientific classification
- Kingdom: Plantae
- Clade: Tracheophytes
- Clade: Angiosperms
- Clade: Eudicots
- Clade: Asterids
- Order: Ericales
- Family: Marcgraviaceae
- Subfamily: Noranteoideae
- Genus: Ruyschia; Jacq.

Synonyms
- Caracasia Szyszyl.; Vargasia Ernst

= Ruyschia =

Genus of plants

Ruyschia is a genus of flowering plants belonging to the family Marcgraviaceae.

Its native range is from southern Mexico down to Tropical America. It is found in Belize, Bolivia, Colombia, Costa Rica, Ecuador, Guatemala, Honduras, the Leeward Islands, Mexico, Panamá, Peru, Trinidad-Tobago, Venezuela, Venezuelan Antilles and the Windward Islands.

The genus name of Ruyschia is in honour of Frederik Ruysch (1638–1731), a Dutch botanist and anatomist. He is known for developing techniques for preserving anatomical specimens, which he used to create dioramas or scenes incorporating human parts. It was first described and published in Enum. Syst. Pl. on page 2 in 1760.

== Known species ==
According to Kew:

- Ruyschia andina de Roon
- Ruyschia clusiifolia Jacq.
- Ruyschia enervia Lundell
- Ruyschia moralesii Hammel
- Ruyschia pavonii G.Don
- Ruyschia phylladenia Sandwith
- Ruyschia pilophora Triana & Planch.
- Ruyschia tremadena (Ernst) Lundell
- Ruyschia valerioi Standl.
- Ruyschia viridiflora (Ernst) Lundell
