= Neohebestola parvula =

Scientific classification
- Kingdom: Animalia
- Phylum: Arthropoda
- Class: Insecta
- Order: Coleoptera
- Suborder: Polyphaga
- Infraorder: Cucujiformia
- Family: Cerambycidae
- Genus: Neohebestola
- Species: N. parvula

Binomial name
- Neohebestola parvula (Blanchard in Gay, 1851)

Species of beetle

Neohebestola parvula is a species of beetle in the family Cerambycidae. It was described by Blanchard in 1851. It is known from Chile.
