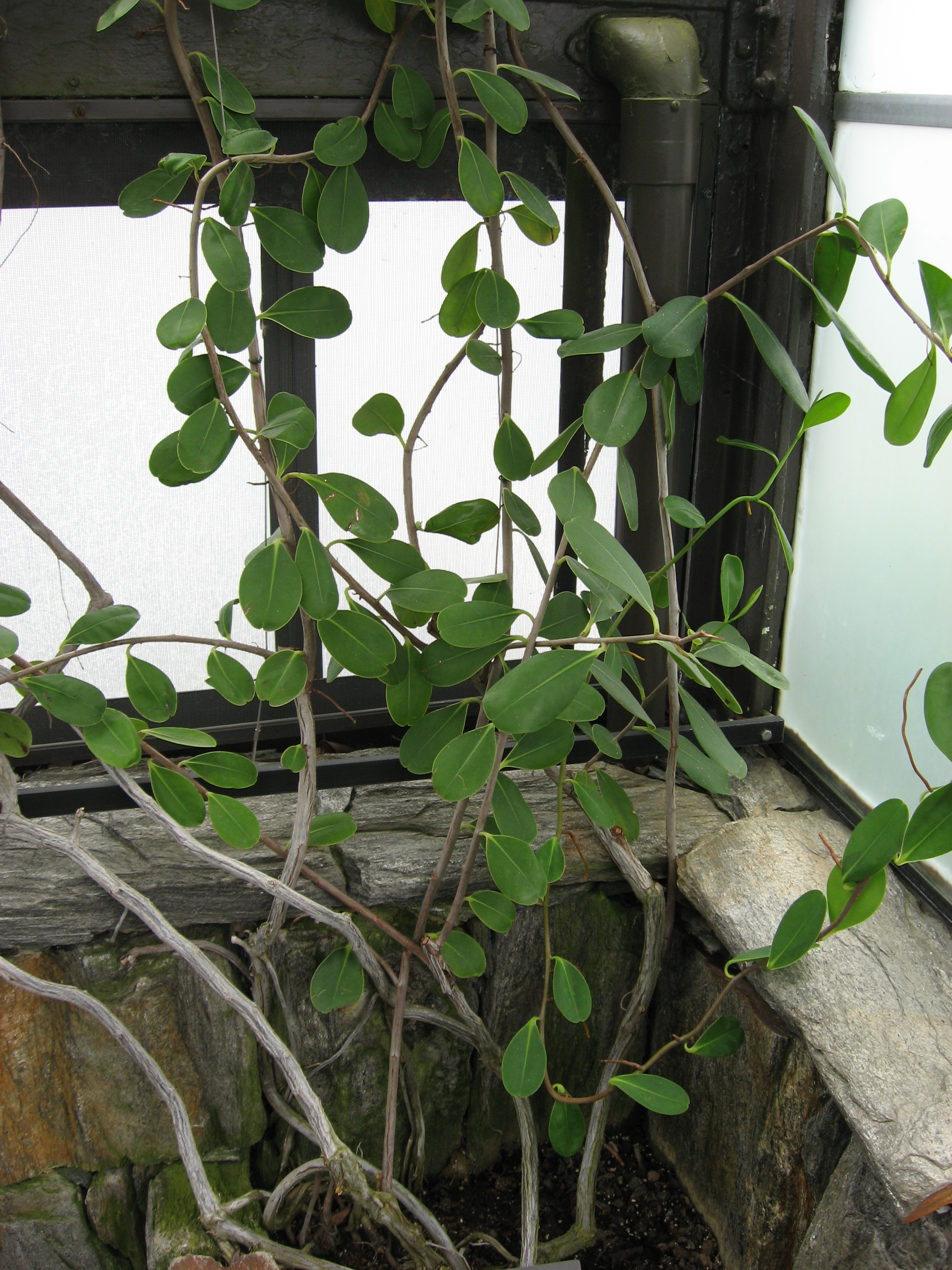
- Norantea brasiliensis (synonym of Schwartzia brasiliensis)

Scientific classification
- Kingdom: Plantae
- Clade: Tracheophytes
- Clade: Angiosperms
- Clade: Eudicots
- Clade: Asterids
- Order: Ericales
- Family: Marcgraviaceae
- Genus: Schwartzia; Vell.

Synonyms
- Caracasia Szyszyl.; Vargasia Ernst

= Schwartzia (plant) =

Genus of plants

Schwartzia is a genus of flowering plants belonging to the family Marcgraviaceae. It is found in tropical parts of South America, mainly within the rainforest. It has greenish, white, reddish or red coloured flowers.

== Description ==
They are sprawling shrubs, lianas, and sometimes small trees. The leaves are spirally arranged, sessile (without a stalk) or petiolate (having a leaf stalk). They are coriaceous (leathery or stiff and tough), It has inflorescences which are short racemes with between 8-60 flowers, (though Schwartzia brasiliensis has long racemes of between 60 and 300 flowers). They have straight, rarely geniculate (bent at a sharp angle), slender or stout, and elongated pedicels (flower stalks), which are between 1.4–9 cm (1–4 in), depending on the species. The nectaries are adnate (grown from or closely fused to an organ) to the lower third of the pedicel, mostly stipitate (stalked or borne on a stipe), cup-like, sac-like or boat shaped. The flowers have 5 sepals and 5 petals, which are connate (or fused to another organ) and greenish, white, reddish or red in colour shades. The 5 imbricated (or tiled, overlapping) sepals are generally circular in shape. They form a quincunx and are coriaceous (leathery, stiff and tough). The 5 petals are free to variously connate, imbricate in bud and strongly reflexed (bent) at anthesis (after flowering). It has 12–85 stamens, with the filaments (stamen stalks) mostly free or the outer whorl basally adnate (fused together) to the corolla, linear, flattened or somewhat triangular. The anthers are approximately sagittate (arrowhead-shaped), or heart-shaped. The thecae are elongated. The ovary has 3 or 5 fused carpels, or seed chambers and few to numerous ovules per locule or chamber. The stigma is smooth or slightly capitate (like the head of a pin) or radiate.

After flowering it produces a leathery looking, fruit or seed capsule, which is almost globose (spherical) or berry-like (when immature). When ripe, they are often red or orange in color or just suffused with red. The fruits are sometimes also referred to as 'berries'. Inside the capule, the seeds are reniform (kidney-shaped) to hemispheric. The testa (seed coat) is reticulate (net-like) and red-black or glossy, shiny black.

== Ecology ==
The flowers of the various Schwartzia species are visited by bees, wasps, ants and also, butterflies. However, the construction of the inflorescences with the large distances between the flowers and the nectaries excludes pollination by insects, since even the largest insects do not touch the flower organs when harvesting the nectaries. Therefore, only birds, bats and other small mammals can be considered effective pollinators. Among birds, only perched birds such as the sugarbird (Promerops) are considered more suitable for pollination rather than hummingbirds. From Brazil, however, pollination of Schwartzia adamantium by the swallow-tailed hummingbird (Eupetomena macroura) is documented.

== Taxonomy ==
The genus name of Schwartzia is in honour of Olof Swartz (1760–1818), a Swedish botanist and taxonomist. He is best known for his taxonomic work and studies into pteridophytes. It was first described and published in Fl. Flumin. Vol. 5 on page 221 in 1829.

Schwartzia glabra Vell. was the only species discussed there and thus became the type species. However, the same species was validly described as early as 1824 under the name Norantea brasiliensis by the Swiss botanist Jacques Denys Choisy and is therefore now called Schwartzia brasiliensis.

Schwartzia was treated as part of a broad genus of Norantea until the mid-1990s. The species of today's genera Marcgraviastrum, Pseudosarcopera and Sarcopera were also counted within Norantea. Beginning with the unpublished dissertation by the American botanist Hollis G. Bedell from 1985, in which a division of the genus Norantea was proposed, a classification concept with several smaller genera has now prevailed. Schwartzia includes the former subgenus of Cochliophyllum and partially the subgenus Byrsophyllum of the genus Norantea. In contrast to Norantea, Schwartzia has relatively short-stalked or sessile nectaries on the lower to middle part of the relatively long flower stalks.

A phylogenetic study in 2002, was based on three regions of the plastid genome, has now confirmed that Norantea is not monophyletic in the old, broad sense. In this work, Schwartzia costaricensis, the only examined representative of Schwartzia, was the 'sister' taxon to Ruyschia phylladenia, the only examined representative of Ruyschia, with good statistical certainty.

== Known species ==
According to Kew and Plants of the World Online:

- Schwartzia adamantium (Cambess.) Bedell ex Gir.-Cañas
- Schwartzia andina Gir.-Cañas
- Schwartzia antioquensis Gir.-Cañas
- Schwartzia brasiliensis (Choisy) Bedell ex Gir.-Cañas
- Schwartzia brenesii (Standl.) Bedell
- Schwartzia chocoensis Gir.-Cañas
- Schwartzia costaricensis (Gilg) Bedell
- Schwartzia diaz-piedrahitae Gir.-Cañas
- Schwartzia geniculatiflora Gir.-Cañas & Fiaschi
- Schwartzia jimenezii (Standl.) Bedell
- Schwartzia jucuensis Gir.-Cañas
- Schwartzia lozaniana Gir.-Cañas
- Schwartzia magnifica (Gilg) Bedell
- Schwartzia parrae Gir.-Cañas
- Schwartzia petersonii Gir.-Cañas
- Schwartzia pterosara de Roon & Bedell ex Gir.-Cañas
- Schwartzia renvoizei Gir.-Cañas
- Schwartzia spiciflora (Juss.) Bedell
- Schwartzia tarrazuensis Hammel
- Schwartzia weddelliana (Baill.) Bedell

Schwartzia diazpiedrahitae Gir.-Cañas from western Colombia and Ecuador, which was only described in 2001, was then transferred to the genus Pseudosarcopera as Pseudosarcopera diaz-piedrahitae, but when that genus was declared a synonym of Sarcopera it was transferred back to Schwartzia diazpiedrahitae Gir.-Cañas.

== Distribution ==
Its native range is in Tropical America. It is found within Bolivia, Brazil, Colombia, Costa Rica, Ecuador, Leeward Islands, Panamá, Peru, Trinidad and Tobago, Venezuela and the Windward Islands.

== Habitat ==
The majority of Schwartzia species grow in montane rainforests and cloud forests. Schwartzia costaricensis and Schwartzia andina reach altitudes of up to around 2,400 metres (7,900 ft), while the Peruvian-based, Schwartzia magnifica reaches up to 2,500 metres (8,200 ft). Only a few species, in particular the Colombian Schwartzia chocoensis, also occur in lowland rainforests. Several species also inhabit secondary forests and forest edges. Schwartzia chocoensis is also found in mangroves and on the banks of large rivers.

The Brazilian species show clearly different habitat requirements. Only the very rare Schwartzia geniculatiflora is tied to the Atlantic rainforest. The other species, on the other hand, occur in different types of savannas and scrub forests as well as on rocky sites. Schwartzia adamantium inhabits the Campos cerrados in particular and reaches an altitude of 1,500 metres (4,900 ft) above sea level, depending on its distribution inland. Schwartzia brasiliensis, instead, occurs along the coast up to about 1,000 metres (3,300 ft) above sea level and inhabits scrub forests and savannahs on rocky sites. But in coastal landscape, where it grows in scrub forests on sandy soil and along its margins. The species also occurs in mangrove forests. Schwartzia jucuensisis is known only from the rocky banks of the Jucu River in the state of Espírito Santo.

== Other sources ==
- D. Giraldo-Cañas: Revisión de las especies colombianas del genero Schwartzia (Marcgraviaceae). Caldasia. 25, 2003, pp. 1–21. (PDF)
- D. Giraldo-Cañas: Validation of a new species of Schwartzia (Marcgraviaceae) and synopsis of the genus for Ecuador. Novon. 15, 2005, pp. 123–127. (on-line)
- D. Giraldo-Cañas: Lectotipificación para Schwartzia magnifica (complejo Norantea, Marcgraviaceae) and revisión del genero para Bolivia y Perú. Caldasia. 28, 2006, pp. 275–283. (on-line)
- D. Giraldo-Cañas: Las especies mesoamericanas y caribeñas del generos Schwartzia (complejo Norantea, Marcgraviaceae). Revista Institucional Universidad Tecnológica del Chocó. 27, 2008, pp. 4–18. (on-line)
- D. Giraldo-Cañas, P. Fiaschi: Las Marcgraviaceae (Ericales) de Brasil: Las esspecies del complejo Norantea. Caldasia. 27, 2005, pp. 173–194.
- Souza, V.C. 2015. Marcgraviaceae in Lista de Espécies da Flora do Brasil. Jardim Botânico do Rio de Janeiro.
