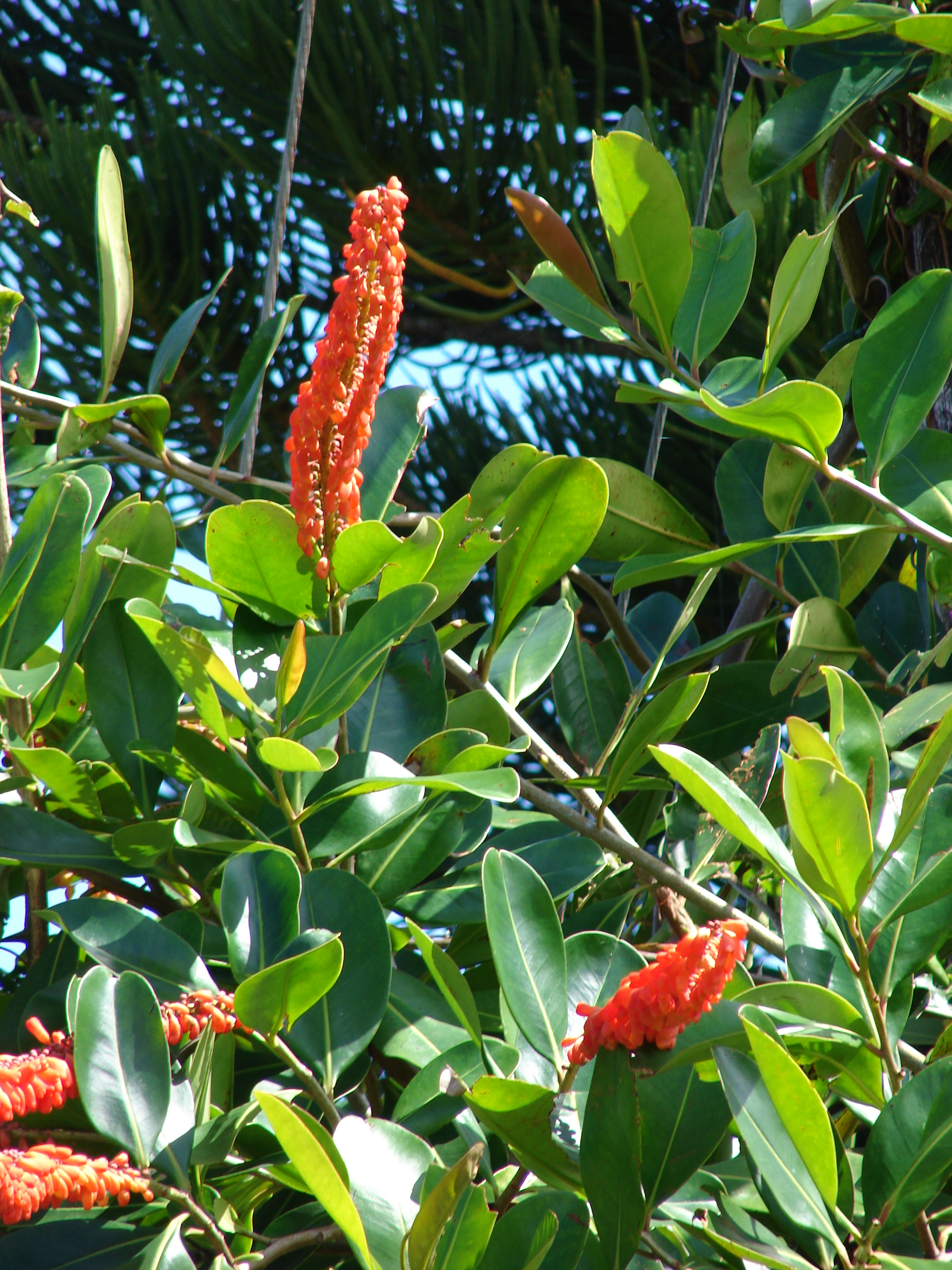
- Norantea guianensis subsp. guianensis (flowers and leaves).

Scientific classification
- Kingdom: Plantae
- Clade: Tracheophytes
- Clade: Angiosperms
- Clade: Eudicots
- Clade: Asterids
- Order: Ericales
- Family: Marcgraviaceae
- Genus: Norantea; Aubl.

= Norantea =

Genus of plants

Norantea is a genus of flowering plants belonging to the family Marcgraviaceae.

Its native range is the Southern Caribbean to Southern Tropical America.

== Species ==
Species:

- Norantea brasiliensis Choisy
- Norantea guianensis Aubl.
