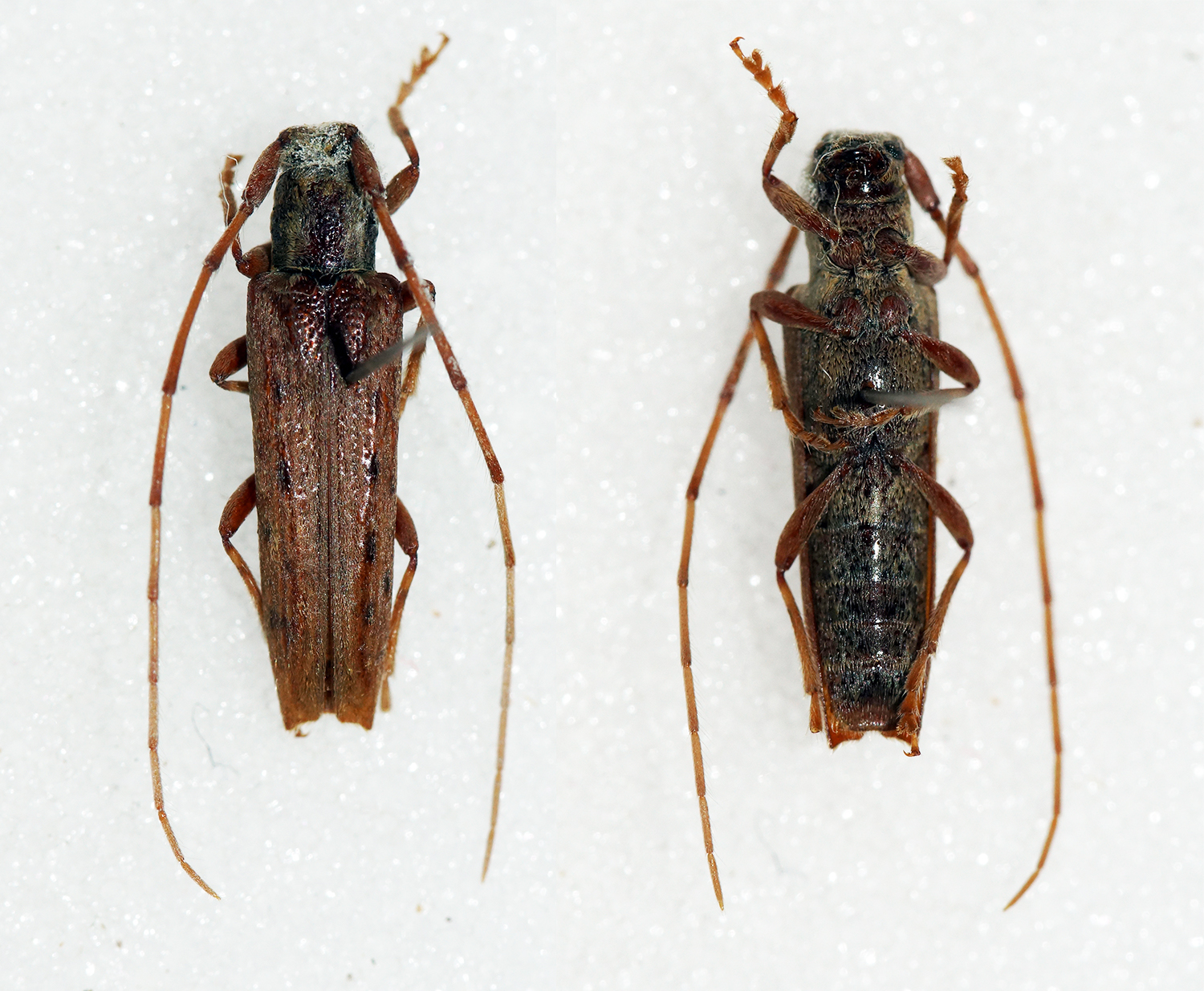
- Neohebestola petrosa

Scientific classification
- Kingdom: Animalia
- Phylum: Arthropoda
- Class: Insecta
- Order: Coleoptera
- Suborder: Polyphaga
- Infraorder: Cucujiformia
- Family: Cerambycidae
- Subfamily: Lamiinae
- Tribe: Forsteriini
- Genus: Neohebestola; Marinoni, 1977

= Neohebestola =

Genus of beetles

Neohebestola is a genus of longhorn beetles of the subfamily Lamiinae, containing the following species:

- Neohebestola apicalis (Fairmaire & Germain, 1859)
- Neohebestola brasiliensis (Fontes & Martins, 1977)
- Neohebestola concolor (Fabricius, 1798)
- Neohebestola humeralis (Blanchard, 1851)
- Neohebestola luchopegnai Martins & Galileo, 1989
- Neohebestola parvula (Blanchard in Gay, 1851)
- Neohebestola petrosa (Blanchard in Gay, 1851)
- Neohebestola vitticollis (Blanchard in Gay, 1851)
