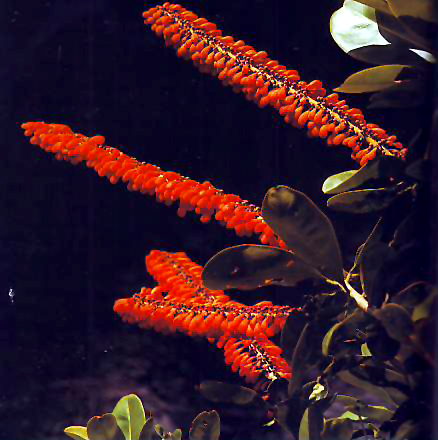
- Sarcopera flammifera

Scientific classification
- Kingdom: Plantae
- Clade: Tracheophytes
- Clade: Angiosperms
- Clade: Eudicots
- Clade: Asterids
- Order: Ericales
- Family: Marcgraviaceae
- Genus: Sarcopera; Bedell

= Sarcopera =

Genus of plants

Sarcopera is a genus of flowering plants belonging to the family Marcgraviaceae.

Its native range is Central and Southern Tropical America.

Species:

- Sarcopera anomala (Kunth) Bedell
- Sarcopera aurantiaca (Spruce ex Gilg) de Roon & S.Dressler
- Sarcopera cordachida (G.Don) Bedell ex S.Dressler
- Sarcopera flammifera de Roon & Bedell
- Sarcopera oxystylis (Baill.) Bedell ex Gir.-Cañas
- Sarcopera rosulata de Roon & Bedell
- Sarcopera sessiliflora (Triana & Planch.) Bedell
- Sarcopera tepuiensis (de Roon) Bedell
