= Neohebestola brasiliensis =

Scientific classification
- Kingdom: Animalia
- Phylum: Arthropoda
- Class: Insecta
- Order: Coleoptera
- Suborder: Polyphaga
- Infraorder: Cucujiformia
- Family: Cerambycidae
- Genus: Neohebestola
- Species: N. brasiliensis

Binomial name
- Neohebestola brasiliensis (Fontes & Martins, 1977)

Species of beetle

Neohebestola brasiliensis is a species of beetle in the family Cerambycidae. It was described by Fontes and Martins in 1977. It is known from Brazil.
