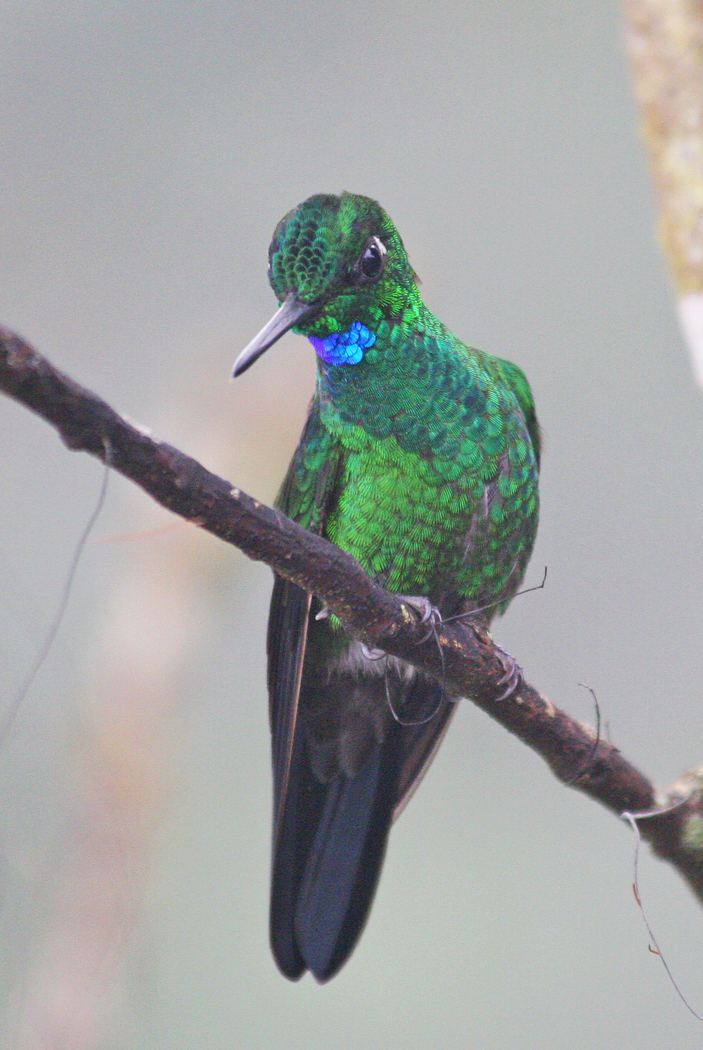
- male in NW Ecuador
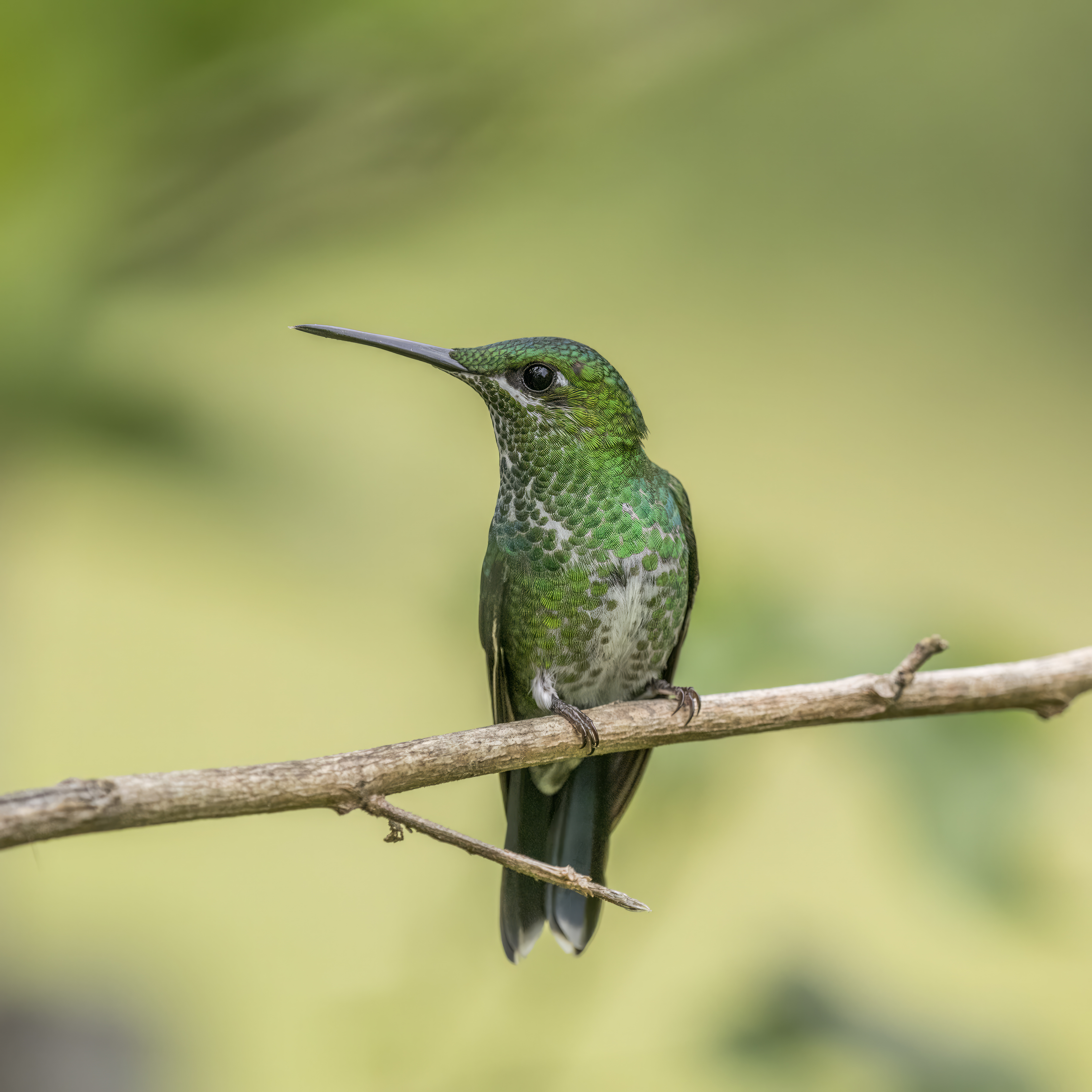
- Female in Mount Totumas cloud forest, Panama

Conservation status
- Least Concern (IUCN 3.1)
- CITES Appendix II

Scientific classification
- Kingdom: Animalia
- Phylum: Chordata
- Class: Aves
- Order: Apodiformes
- Family: Trochilidae
- Genus: Heliodoxa
- Species: H. jacula

Binomial name
- Heliodoxa jacula Gould, 1850
- Range of H. jacula

= Green-crowned brilliant =

Species of hummingbird

The green-crowned brilliant (Heliodoxa jacula) is species of hummingbird in the "brilliants", tribe Heliantheini in subfamily Lesbiinae. It is found in Colombia, Costa Rica, Ecuador, and Panama. It is also known as the green-fronted brilliant.

== Taxonomy and systematics ==
The green-crowned brilliant has three subspecies, the nominate H. j. jacula, H. j. henryi, and H. j. jamersoni.

== Description ==
Male green-crowned brilliants are 12 to 13 cm (4.7 to 5.1 in) long and females 10.5 to 12 g (0.37 to 0.42 oz). One female weighed 7.4 g (0.26 oz). Both sexes of all subspecies have a white spot behind the eye and a forked tail, though that of the female is not as deeply indented as the male's.

Adult males of the nominate subspecies have a glittering green to blue-green head and breast with a small metallic violet-blue patch on the throat. The upperparts and belly are bronzy green, the vent area white, and the thighs also white. The tail is blue-black. Adult females' blue-green head is not shiny like the male's. They also have a short white malar stripe. Their underparts are whitish and heavily spotted with green; the spots merge on the flanks. The tail is black and the outer feathers have white tips. Immature males have a dull bronzy green crown and underparts, a bright buff chin and malar, and a shallowly forked tail. Immature females have a bright buff throat and duller green spots on the underparts than the adult.

Subspecies H. j. henryi is larger than the nominate. Males' heads have a more brilliant glitter than the nominate's and their plumage is greener with less or no blue. Females have more white on their underparts and the separate green spots extend onto the flanks. Males of H. j. jamersoni are much duller than the nominate on the head and breast; their tail is shorter and its central feathers have a green gloss.

== Distribution and habitat ==
The nominate subspecies of green-crowned brilliant is found from Panamá Province in eastern Panama into Colombia, where it inhabits all three Andean ranges. H. j. henryi is found more northerly, from Costa Rica south and east into Panama as far as Coclé Province. H. j. jamersoni is found from Colombia's Nariño Department (and possibly from further north in Cauca Department) south along the western slope of the Andes of Ecuador at least as far as El Oro Province.

The green-crowned brilliant inhabits a variety of landscapes including the interior, edges, and clearings of humid sub-montane and montane forest; mature secondary forest; and gardens. In elevation it generally ranges between 700 and 2,200 m (2,300 and 7,200 ft) in Costa Rica, though sometimes as low as 100 m (330 ft). In Panama it is usually found between 500 and 2,100 m (1,600 and 6,900 ft), in Colombia between 300 and 1,700 m (980 and 5,600 ft), and in Ecuador between 500 and 1,550 m (1,600 and 5,100 ft). There are also records as low as 300 m (980 ft) in Ecuador.

== Behavior ==
=== Movement ===
The low-elevation records of green-crowned brilliant in Costa Rica and Ecuador may indicate seasonal movements.

=== Feeding ===
The green-crowned brilliant usually forages in the middle and upper strata of the forest. A primary source of nectar is Marcgravia vines, and females also feed at small understory plants. Males sometimes defend Marcgravia patches, though they also nectar by trap-lining, visiting a circuit of flowering plants. The species usually clings to flowers to feed rather than hovering.

=== Breeding ===
The green-crowned brilliant's nesting season in Costa Rica is thought to span from July or August to January and in Colombia from May to September. The nest is a bulky cup of plant fibers and scales of tree ferns saddled on a thin down-sloping branch, typically between 2 and 6 m (7 and 20 ft) above the ground. The female alone incubates the two white elliptical eggs.

=== Vocalization ===
The green-crowned brilliant makes "a loud and squeaky kyew or tyew call". In Costa Rica, displaying males make "a tseek, tseek, tseek" call. During chases the species makes "loud sputtering notes and squeaks".

== Status ==
The IUCN has assessed the green-crowned brilliant as being of Least Concern, though its population size is not known and is believed to be decreasing. No immediate threats have been identified. It has been recorded in several protected areas. It "shows some tolerance of habitat fragmentation, degradation and disturbance [but] outright forest clearance is expected to cause local population declines".

== Gallery ==
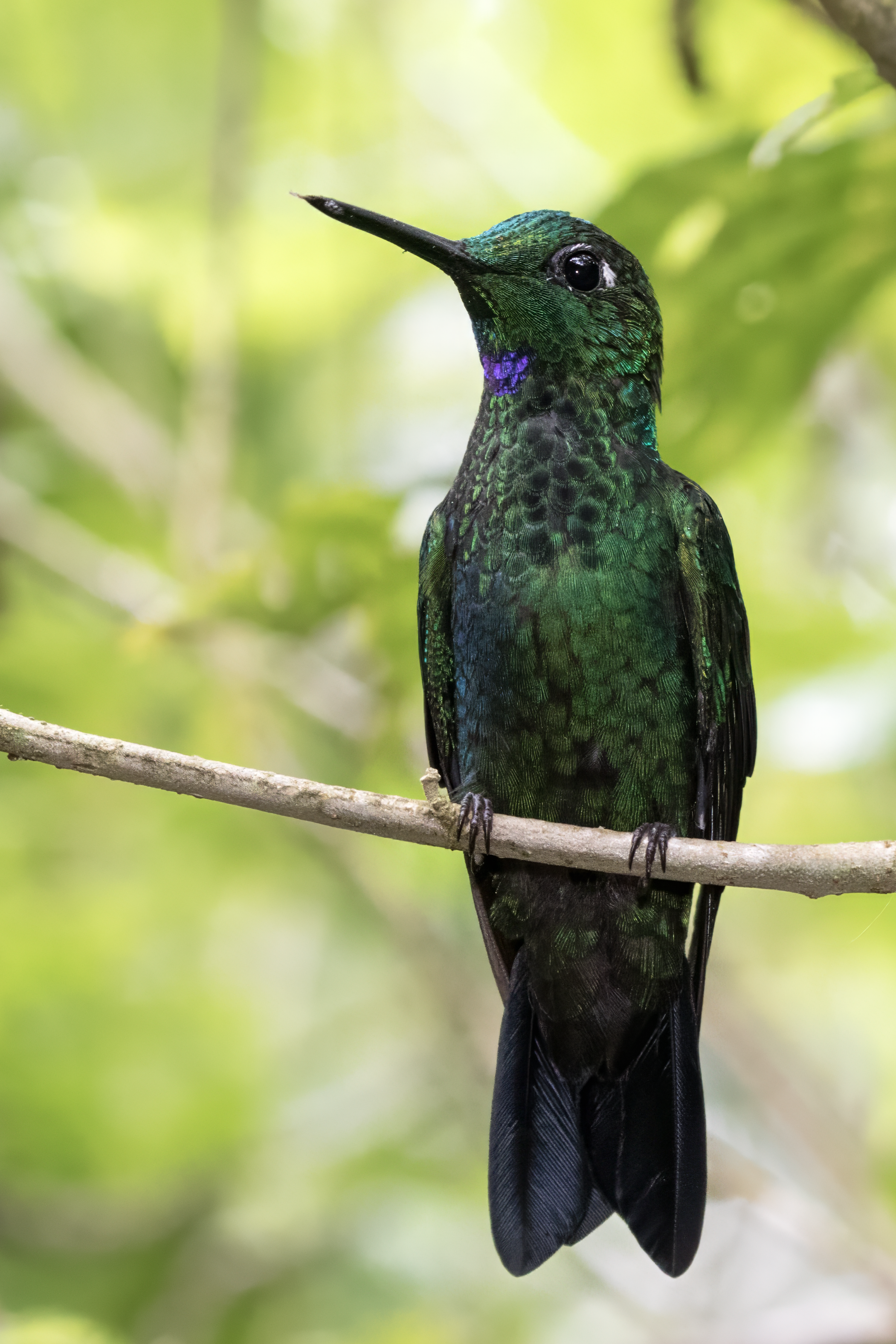
male in Alajuela Province, Costa Rica

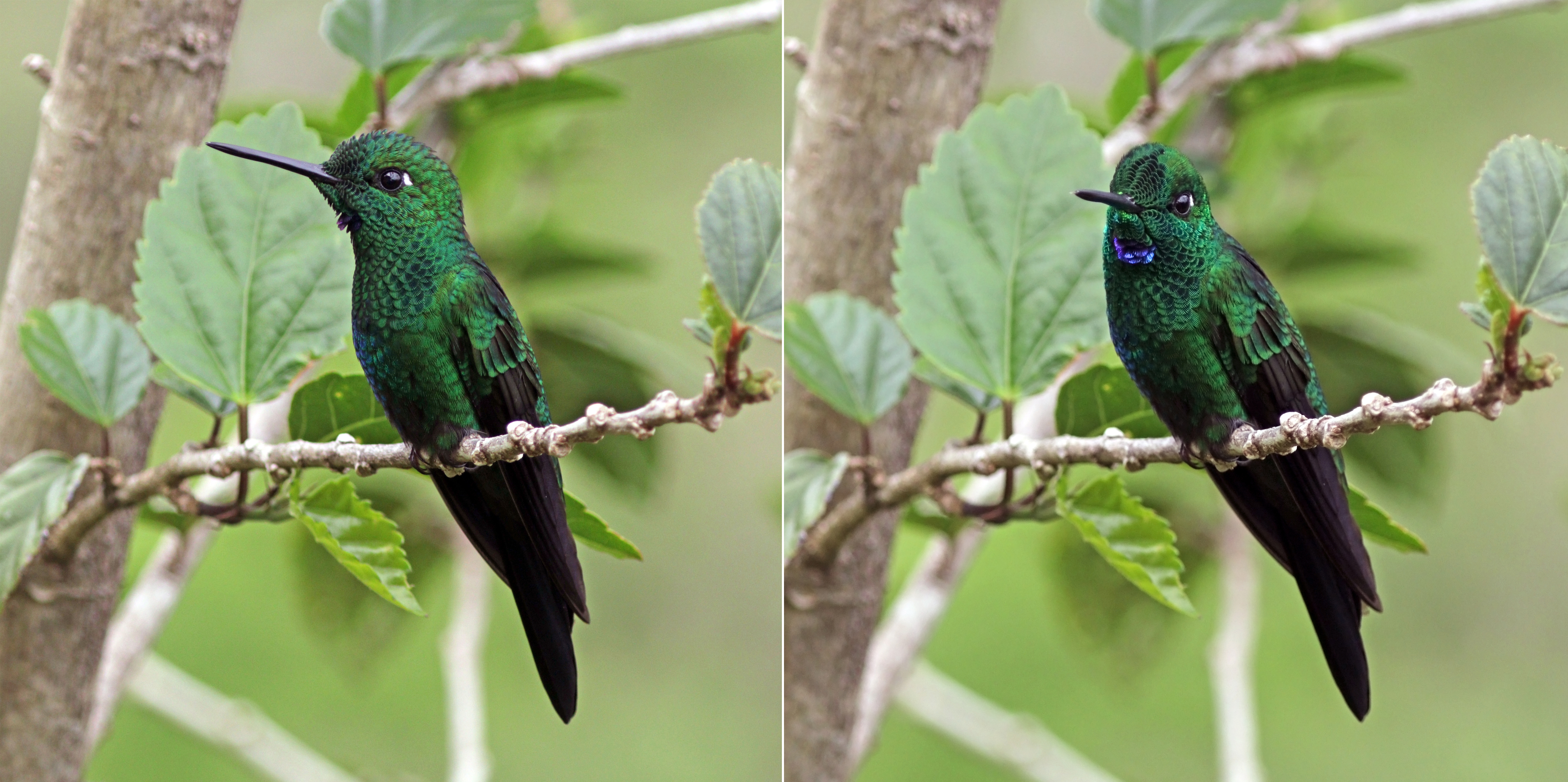
Composite showing effect of light reflection on the color of male H. j. henryi's gorget, Mount Totumas cloud forest, Panama

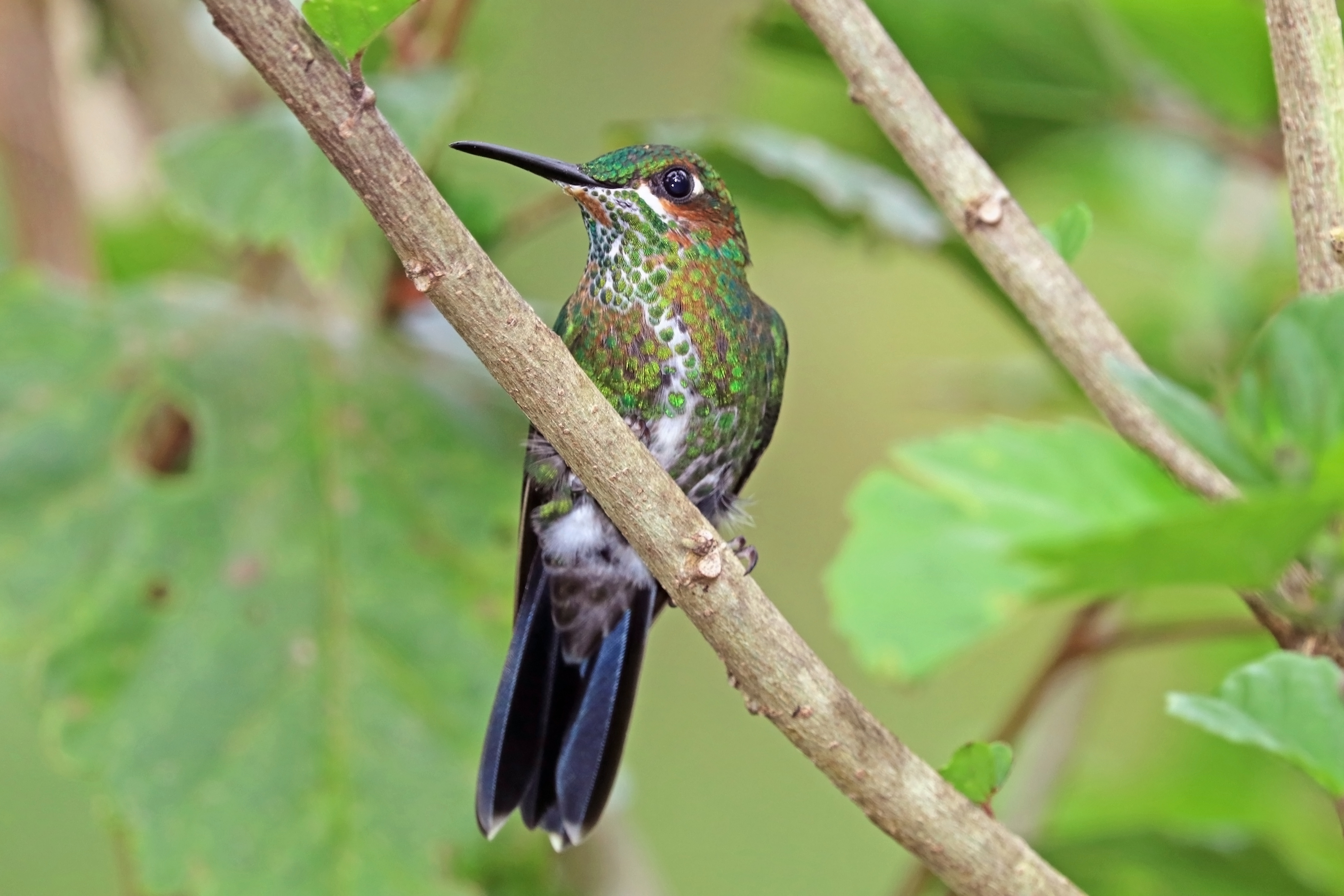
Juvenile H. j. henryi
