= Olof Swartz =

Swedish botanist and taxonomist

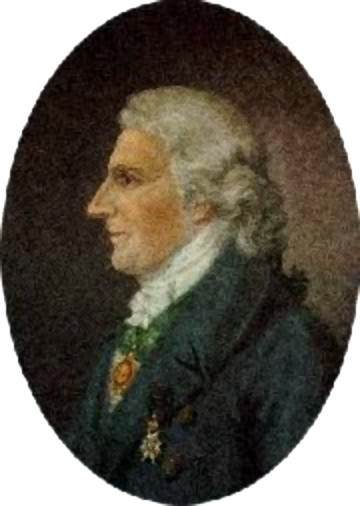
- Olof Swartz
- Born: 21 September 1760; Norrköping, Sweden
- Died: 19 September 1818 (aged 57); Stockholm
- Education: University of Uppsala
- Known for: pteridophytes
- Scientific career
- Fields: botany
- Doctoral advisor: Carolus Linnaeus the Younger
- Author abbrev. (botany): Sw.

Olof Peter Swartz (21 September 1760 – 19 September 1818) was a Swedish botanist and taxonomist. He is best known for his taxonomic work and studies into pteridophytes, but also studied orchids, mosses and lichens.

== Biography ==
Olof Swartz attended the University of Uppsala where he studied under Carl Linnaeus the Younger (1741–1783) and received his doctorate in 1781. He first traveled in 1780 to Lapland in the company of several other botanists.

In 1783 he sailed for North America and the West Indies, primarily in the area of Jamaica and Hispaniola, to collect botanical specimens. His botanical collection, of an impressive 6000 specimens, is now held by the Swedish Museum of Natural History, as part of the Regnellian herbarium.

Dr. Olof Swartz: drawing of Malaxis umbelliflora

By 1786 he left for London to prepare his collection. There he met naturalist Joseph Banks (1743–1820), who was impressed with his knowledge of Botany. He was offered a position with the British East India Company as a travelling physician, but turned it down, and returned to Sweden in 1787. Ten years later he proposed to the Royal Swedish Academy of Sciences (of which he became a member in 1789) the idea of a permanent travel grant, based on the methods he had seen employed by Joseph Banks within the British Empire. In 1791 he became Professor Bergianus at the Academy of Sciences at Stockholm. He was elected a Foreign Honorary Member of the American Academy of Arts and Sciences in 1805. He was elected a member of the American Philosophical Society in 1806.

Swartz was the first specialist of orchid taxonomy, who published a critical review of orchid literature and classified the 25 genera that he recognized through his work. He was also the first to realize that most orchids have one stamen, while slipper orchids have two.

== Lichenology ==
Although Swartz is best known for his work on flowering plants and ferns, he began his career with a serious interest in lichens and mosses, which he made the subject of his medical dissertation at Uppsala University. In Methodus muscorum illustrata (1781) he discussed eleven lichens and described five as new, using the broad Linnaean genus Lichen (a convention he largely kept in later writings). The dissertation also included his account of Lichen filix, based on material in Carl Peter Thunberg's herbarium, which has been treated as the first lichen formally described from New Zealand and the Southern Hemisphere. In modern author citations his abbreviation "Sw." remains familiar to lichenologists through species such as Thamnolia vermicularis and Ochrolechia frigida.

Swartz's later lichen work was strongly shaped by his overseas collecting, especially in Jamaica (1783–1786), where he gathered a substantial number of lichens alongside other plant groups. His published lichen studies fall into two early Swedish contributions (1781, 1784) and three New World treatments (1788, 1806, 1811). While working in London on his West Indian collections, he prepared Nova genera et species plantarum seu Prodromus (1788), which introduced 20 Jamaican lichens with brief Latin diagnoses and localities; in keeping with Linnaean practice he placed most in Lichen (with a few assigned elsewhere) and treated lichens within the "algae" section of cryptogams. He later expanded this material in volume 3 of Flora Indiae occidentalis (1806), supplying fuller descriptions and habitat notes, and in Lichenes Americani (1811), which treated 25 species (mainly Jamaican, with a few from the eastern United States) and included detailed hand-coloured illustrations. Across his five main lichen accounts (1781–1811) Swartz described 37 new species, of which 27 names remain in use as basionyms of accepted taxa.

Swartz also influenced lichen taxonomy through his close association with Erik Acharius. Acharius examined many of Swartz's lichen collections from Sweden, Jamaica and North America and described additional species from that material, while Swartz acted as a steady supporter of Acharius's developing classification between 1794 and 1814. Their Stockholm friendship and correspondence mattered because Swartz connected Acharius with British botanists and helped channel letters and specimens from England to him, contributing to the shaping and publication of Acharius's ideas on lichen systematics. Even as administrative and broader botanical duties took over, Swartz continued to distribute duplicate specimens generously (sometimes to the detriment of his own herbarium) and remained a friend and advocate of the Acharius programme that became the basis of modern lichen systematics.

== Legacy ==
The genus Swartzia (Caesalpiniaceae, Fabaceae or Leguminosae) was named in his honour by Schreber. Then Schwartzia, which is a genus of flowering plants belonging to the family Marcgraviaceae was named in 1829 by Vell.

== Selected works ==
- Nova genera et species plantarum seu prodromus, 1788
- Observationes botanicae, 1791
- Icones plantarum incognitarum, illustrating the rare plants of the West Indies (Upsala, 1794-1800)
- Flora Indiae occidentalis, (3 vols., 1797-1806)
- Synopsis Filicum, 1806
- Lichenes Americani (Nuremberg, 1811)
- Summa vegetabilium Scandinaviae, 1814

== See also ==
- Category:Taxa named by Olof Swartz
