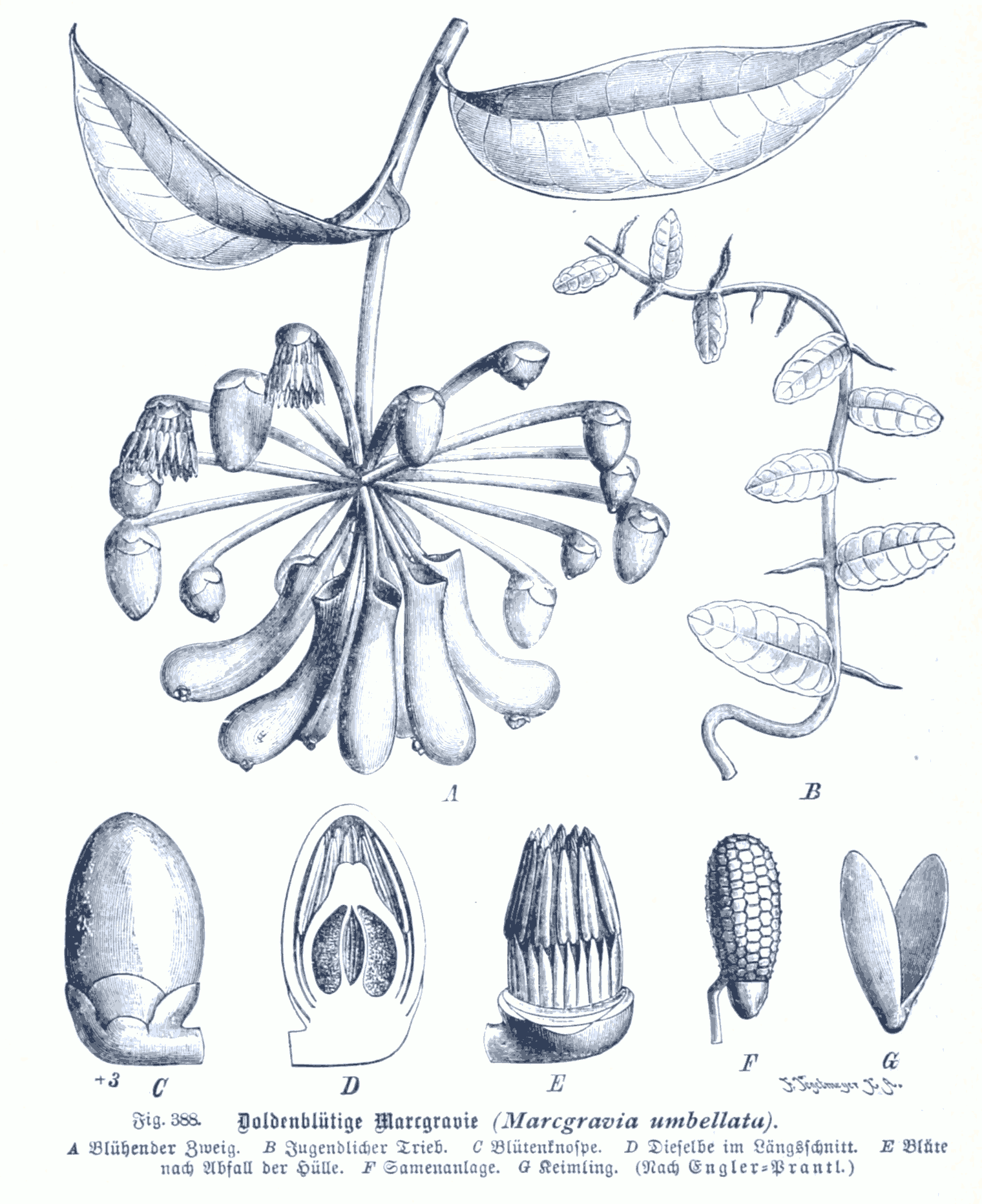
- Marcgravia umbellata

Scientific classification
- Kingdom: Plantae
- Clade: Tracheophytes
- Clade: Angiosperms
- Clade: Eudicots
- Clade: Asterids
- Order: Ericales
- Family: Marcgraviaceae; Bercht. & J.Presl

Genera
- See text

= Marcgraviaceae =

Family of dicot flowering plants

The Marcgraviaceae are a neotropical angiosperm family in the order Ericales. The members of the family are shrubs, woody epiphytes, and lianas, with alternate, pinnately nerved leaves. The flowers are arranged in racemes. The flowers are accompanied by modified, fleshy, saccate bracts which produce nectar. The flowers are pentamerous. The fruits are capsules.

== Genera ==
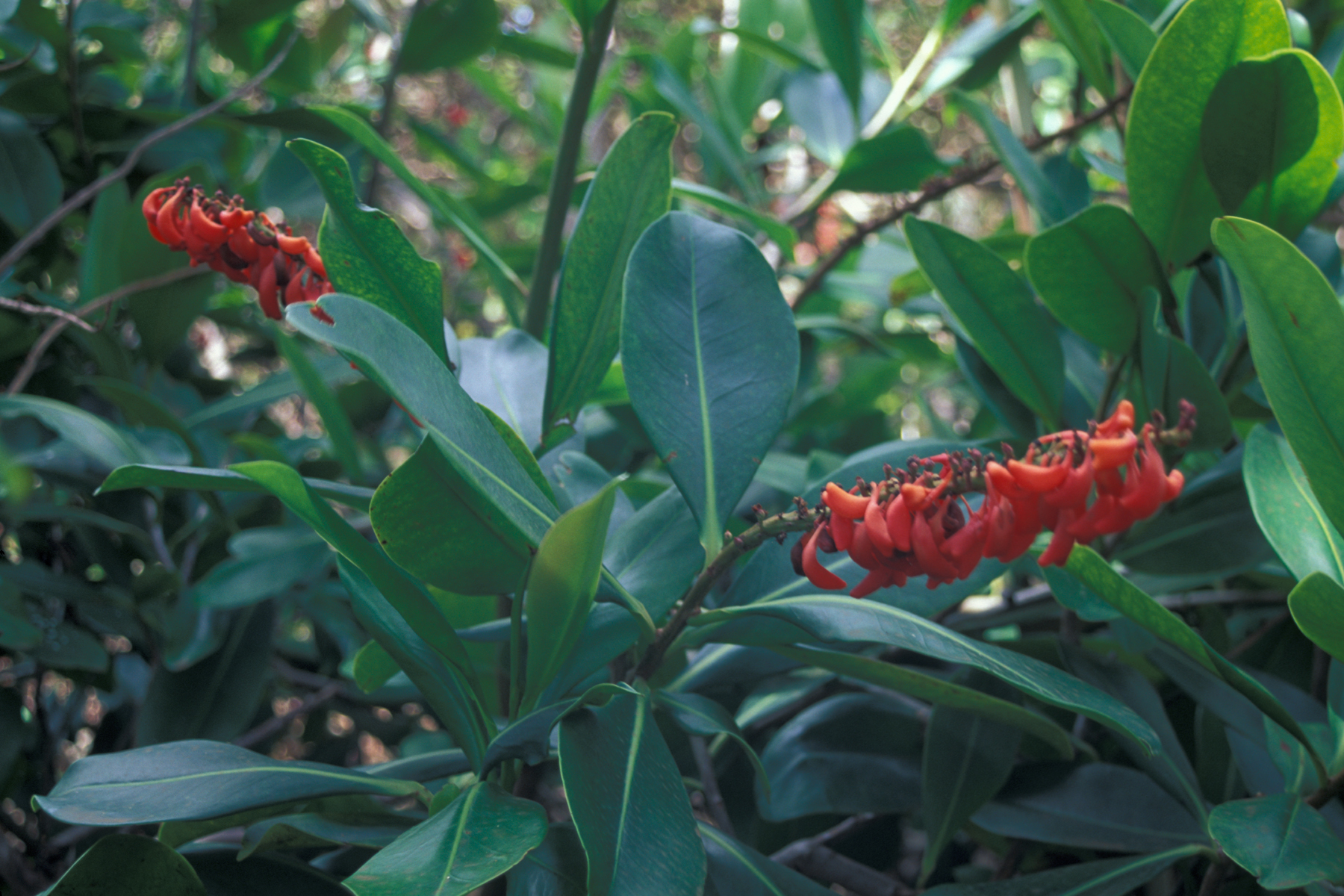
Norantea guianensis subsp. guianensis

The family has seven genera:

- Marcgravia L. - (ca. 65 spp.): S Mexico, Mesoamerica, South America, Antilles
- Marcgraviastrum (Wittm. ex Szyszył.) de Roon & S.Dressler - (15 spp.): S Nicaragua to Peru, Bolivia plus 2 spp. in E Brazil
- Norantea Aubl - (2 spp.): Caribbean and Amazonian basin of NE South America
- Ruyschia Jacq. - (9 spp.): Mesoamerica, N Andes, Lesser Antilles
- Sarcopera Bedell - (ca. 10 spp.): Honduras to N Bolivia, Guiana Highlands
- Schwartzia Vell. - (ca. 15 spp.): Costa Rica through the Andes south to Bolivia, in the Caribbean basin and 1 sp. in E Brazil
- Souroubea Aubl. - (19 spp.): Mexico to Bolivia (absent from the Antilles)

There are 2 known subfamilies; Marcgravioideae (containing Marcgravia and Marcgraviastrum) and Noranteoideae (containing the rest of the genera).

Former genus include Pseudosarcopera (now listed as a synonym of Sarcopera).

== Other sources ==
- Bedell, H.G. 1989. Marcgraviaceae. In: Howard, R.A. (ed.). Flora of the Lesser Antilles 5: 300–310.
- Dressler, S. 2000. Marcgraviaceae. In: Flora de República de Cuba, Ser. A, Fasc. 5: 1–14.
- Dressler, S. 2001. Marcgraviaceae. In: Steyermark, J.A., P.E. Berry, K. Yatskievych & B.K. Holst (eds.), Flora of the Venezuelan Guayana vol 6, pp. 248–260. Missouri Botanical Garden, St. Louis.
- Dressler, S. 2004. Marcgraviaceae. In: Kubitzki, K. (ed.). The Families and Genera of Vascular Plants. vol. 6, pp. 258–265. Springer-Verlag, Berlin.
