= List of Oncidium species =

As of October 2025, Plants of the World Online accepted over 350 species and hybrids of the genus Oncidium.

== A ==
- Oncidium abortivoides M.W.Chase & N.H.Williams
- Oncidium abortivum Rchb.f.
- Oncidium abruptum Linden & Rchb.f. ex Kraenzl.
- Oncidium acinaceum Lindl.
- Oncidium × acuminatissimum (Rchb.f.) M.W.Chase & N.H.Williams
- Oncidium adamsii (Dodson) M.W.Chase & N.H.Williams
- Oncidium adelaidae Königer
- Oncidium × adrianae (L.Linden) M.W.Chase & N.H.Williams
- Oncidium alberti (P.Ortiz) M.W.Chase & N.H.Williams
- Oncidium albicans Königer
- Oncidium alexandrae (Bateman) M.W.Chase & N.H.Williams
- Oncidium allenii Dressler
- Oncidium altissimum (Jacq.) Sw.
- Oncidium alvarezii (P.Ortiz) M.W.Chase & N.H.Williams
- Oncidium amabile Rchb.f.
- Oncidium amazonicum (Schltr.) M.W.Chase & N.H.Williams
- Oncidium amoenum A.Rich. & Galeotti
- Oncidium × andersonianum (Rchb.f.) M.W.Chase & N.H.Williams
- Oncidium andradeanum Dodson & D.E.Benn.
- Oncidium × andreetteanum (Dalström & G.Merino) J.M.H.Shaw
- Oncidium anguloi P.Ortiz
- Oncidium angustisegmentum D.E.Benn. & Christenson
- Oncidium ansiferum Rchb.f.
- Oncidium anthocrene Rchb.f.
- Oncidium antioquiense Kraenzl.
- Oncidium arangoi (Königer) M.W.Chase & N.H.Williams
- Oncidium ariasii Königer
- Oncidium aristuliferum (Kraenzl.) M.W.Chase & N.H.Williams
- Oncidium armatum (Rchb.f.) M.W.Chase & N.H.Williams
- Oncidium aspidorhinum (F.Lehm.) M.W.Chase & N.H.Williams
- Oncidium astranthum (Linden & Rchb.f.) M.W.Chase & N.H.Williams
- Oncidium aurarium Rchb.f.
- Oncidium auriculatoides M.W.Chase & N.H.Williams
- Oncidium auriculatum (Rolfe) M.W.Chase & N.H.Williams
- Oncidium auroincarum (Dalström & Ruíz Pérez) J.M.H.Shaw
- Oncidium ayabacanum D.E.Benn. & Christenson

== B ==
- Oncidium baccatum Garay & Dunst.
- Oncidium × baronii J.M.H.Shaw
- Oncidium baueri Lindl.
- Oncidium befortianum Königer
- Oncidium bennettii Christenson
- Oncidium bicallosoides M.W.Chase & N.H.Williams
- Oncidium blandum (Rchb.f.) M.W.Chase & N.H.Williams
- Oncidium × bockemuhliae J.M.H.Shaw
- Oncidium boothianum Rchb.f.
- Oncidium brachyandrum Lindl.
- Oncidium bracteatum Warsz. & Rchb.f.
- Oncidium × brandtii (Kraenzl. & Wittm.) M.W.Chase & N.H.Williams
- Oncidium braunii Regel
- Oncidium brevicorne (Königer & J.Portilla) M.W.Chase & N.H.Williams
- Oncidium brevilabrum Rolfe
- Oncidium brownii (Garay) M.W.Chase & N.H.Williams
- Oncidium bryocladium Schltr.
- Oncidium bryolophotum Rchb.f.
- Oncidium buchtienoides M.W.Chase & N.H.Williams
- Oncidium bustosii Königer

== C ==
- Oncidium cajamarcae Schltr.
- Oncidium calanthum Rchb.f.
- Oncidium callacallaense (D.E.Benn. & Christenson) M.W.Chase & N.H.Williams
- Oncidium caminiophorum Rchb.f.
- Oncidium caquetanum (Schltr.) M.W.Chase & N.H.Williams
- Oncidium cardioglossum (Pupulin) M.W.Chase & N.H.Williams
- Oncidium cardiostigma Rchb.f.
- Oncidium cariniferum (Rchb.f.) Beer
- Oncidium caucanum Schltr.
- Oncidium × charlesworthii H.J.Veitch
- Oncidium chasei (D.E.Benn. & Christenson) M.W.Chase & N.H.Williams
- Oncidium cheirophorum Rchb.f.
- Oncidium chrysomorphum Lindl.
- Oncidium ciliicolumna (Szlach. & Kolan.) J.M.H.Shaw
- Oncidium cinnamomeum (R.Warner & B.S.Williams) M.W.Chase & N.H.Williams
- Oncidium cirrhosum (Lindl.) Beer
- Oncidium citrinum Lindl.
- Oncidium clovesianum (V.P.Castro & M.M.L.L.Cardoso) J.M.H.Shaw
- Oncidium colombianum (Szlach. & Kolan.) J.M.H.Shaw
- Oncidium constrictum (Lindl.) Beer
- Oncidium contaypacchaense (D.E.Benn. & Christenson) M.W.Chase & N.H.Williams
- Oncidium × cookianum (Rolfe) M.W.Chase & N.H.Williams
- Oncidium coquianum Pupulin & Dalström
- Oncidium × coradinei (Rchb.f.) M.W.Chase & N.H.Williams
- Oncidium crassidactylum (Dalström & Ruíz Pérez) J.M.H.Shaw
- Oncidium crassopterum Chiron
- Oncidium crescentilabium (C.Schweinf.) M.W.Chase & N.H.Williams
- Oncidium crinitum (Rchb.f.) M.W.Chase & N.H.Williams
- Oncidium cristatellum Garay
- Oncidium cristatum (Lindl.) Beer
- Oncidium croatii (Szlach. & Kolan.) J.M.H.Shaw
- Oncidium crocidipterum (Rchb.f.) M.W.Chase & N.H.Williams
- Oncidium cruciferum Rchb.f. & Warsz.
- Oncidium cruentoides M.W.Chase & N.H.Williams
- Oncidium cuculligerum (Schltr.) M.W.Chase & N.H.Williams
- Oncidium cultratum Lindl.
- Oncidium curvipetalum (D.E.Benn. & Christenson) M.W.Chase & N.H.Williams

== D ==
- Oncidium dactyliferum Garay & Dunst.
- Oncidium dactylopterum Rchb.f.
- Oncidium deburghgraeveanum (Dalström & G.Merino) J.M.H.Shaw
- Oncidium decorum Königer
- Oncidium deltoideum Lindl.
- Oncidium × denisoniae (Anon.) J.M.H.Shaw
- Oncidium dichromaticum Rchb.f.
- Oncidium × dicranophorum (Rchb.f.) M.W.Chase & N.H.Williams
- Oncidium digitoides M.W.Chase & N.H.Williams
- Oncidium dilatatum (Rchb.f.) M.W.Chase & N.H.Williams
- Oncidium discobulbon Kraenzl.
- Oncidium dracoceps (Dalström) M.W.Chase & N.H.Williams
- Oncidium dulcineae (Pupulin & G.A.Rojas) M.W.Chase & N.H.Williams

== E ==
- Oncidium echinops Königer
- Oncidium eliae (Rolfe) M.W.Chase & N.H.Williams
- Oncidium emaculatum Ravenna
- Oncidium endocharis Rchb.f.
- Oncidium ensatum Lindl.
- Oncidium epidendroides (Kunth) Beer
- Oncidium estradae Dodson
- Oncidium exalatum Hágsater
- Oncidium × excellens (Rchb.f.) M.W.Chase & N.H.Williams

== F ==
- Oncidium fasciferum Rchb.f. & Warsz.
- Oncidium filamentosum (Dalström & Ruíz Pérez) J.M.H.Shaw
- Oncidium flavobrunneum (Senghas) M.W.Chase & N.H.Williams
- Oncidium fleckiorum Königer
- Oncidium fuchsii Königer
- Oncidium furcatum (Dalström) J.M.H.Shaw
- Oncidium fuscatum Rchb.f.

== G ==
- Oncidium galianoi (Dalström & P.Nuñez) M.W.Chase & N.H.Williams
- Oncidium garcia-barrigae (Szlach. & Kolan.) J.M.H.Shaw
- Oncidium × gardstyle Braem & Campacci
- Oncidium gaviotaense (Szlach. & Kolan.) J.M.H.Shaw
- Oncidium gayi J.M.H.Shaw
- Oncidium geertianum C.Morren
- Oncidium geiseliae Ruschi, A.Albuq., Zippinotti & A.Ruschi
- Oncidium gentryi (Dodson) M.W.Chase & N.H.Williams
- Oncidium ghiesbreghtianum A.Rich. & Galeotti
- Oncidium gloriosum (Linden & Rchb.f.) M.W.Chase & N.H.Williams
- Oncidium gramazuense (D.E.Benn. & Christenson) M.W.Chase & N.H.Williams
- Oncidium gramineum (Poepp. & Endl.) M.W.Chase & N.H.Williams
- Oncidium graminifolium (Lindl.) Lindl.

== H ==
- Oncidium hallii (Lindl.) Beer
- Oncidium hapalotyle Schltr.
- Oncidium harryanum (Rchb.f.) M.W.Chase & N.H.Williams
- Oncidium hastatum (Bateman) Lindl.
- Oncidium hastilabium (Lindl.) Beer
- Oncidium hauensteinii (Königer) M.W.Chase & N.H.Williams
- Oncidium heinzelii Königer
- Oncidium henning-jensenii Pupulin & Bogarín
- Oncidium hennisii (Rolfe) M.W.Chase & N.H.Williams
- Oncidium hermansianum (Königer) M.W.Chase & N.H.Williams
- Oncidium herrenhusanum Königer & Schlumpb.
- Oncidium heteranthum Poepp. & Endl.
- Oncidium heterodactylum Kraenzl.
- Oncidium heterosepalum (Rchb.f.) M.W.Chase & N.H.Williams
- Oncidium hieroglyphicum Rchb.f. & Warsz.
- Oncidium × hinnus (Rchb.f.) M.W.Chase & N.H.Williams
- Oncidium hintonii L.O.Williams
- Oncidium hirtziana J.M.H.Shaw
- Oncidium hirtzoides M.W.Chase & N.H.Williams
- Oncidium huebneri (Mansf.) M.W.Chase & N.H.Williams
- Oncidium hymenanthum (Schltr.) M.W.Chase & N.H.Williams
- Oncidium hyphaematicum Rchb.f.

== I ==
- Oncidium ibis (Schltr.) M.W.Chase & N.H.Williams
- Oncidium imitans Dressler
- Oncidium incurvum Barker ex Lindl.
- Oncidium × inopinatum Christenson
- Oncidium inouei T.Hashim.
- Oncidium integrilabre (Pupulin) M.W.Chase & N.H.Williams
- Oncidium ionopterum Rchb.f.
- Oncidium iricolor Rchb.f.
- Oncidium isthmi Schltr.
- Oncidium ivoneae Königer

== J ==
- Oncidium jarmilae Königer
- Oncidium × jereziorum (Dalström & Deburghgr.) J.M.H.Shaw
- Oncidium juninense (Schltr.) M.W.Chase & N.H.Williams

== K ==
- Oncidium karwinskii (Lindl.) Lindl.
- Oncidium kegeljanii (É.Morren) M.W.Chase & N.H.Williams
- Oncidium khoochongyeei J.M.H.Shaw
- Oncidium koechlinianum Collantes & G.Gerlach
- Oncidium koenigeri M.W.Chase & N.H.Williams
- Oncidium × kraenzlinii (O'Brien) M.W.Chase & N.H.Williams

== L ==
- Oncidium laeve (Lindl.) Beer
- Oncidium lancifolium Lindl.
- Oncidium × leeanum (Rchb.f.) M.W.Chase & N.H.Williams
- Oncidium lehmannianum (Kraenzl.) M.W.Chase & N.H.Williams
- Oncidium lehmannii (Rchb.f.) M.W.Chase & N.H.Williams
- Oncidium leleui R.Jiménez & Soto Arenas
- Oncidium lentiginosum Rchb.f.
- Oncidium leopardinum Lindl.
- Oncidium lepidum Linden & Rchb.f.
- Oncidium lepturum Rchb.f.
- Oncidium leucochilum Bateman ex Lindl.
- Oncidium leucomelas (Rchb.f.) Dressler & N.H.Williams
- Oncidium ligiae Königer
- Oncidium × limbatum (Rchb.f.) M.W.Chase & N.H.Williams
- Oncidium lindleyoides M.W.Chase & N.H.Williams
- Oncidium lineoligerum Rchb.f. & Warsz.
- Oncidium lisae Königer
- Oncidium llanachagaense (D.E.Benn. & Christenson) M.W.Chase & N.H.Williams
- Oncidium lucianianum (Rchb.f.) M.W.Chase & N.H.Williams
- Oncidium × ludwigianum (Roeth) J.M.H.Shaw
- Oncidium × lueroroides M.W.Chase & N.H.Williams
- Oncidium luteopurpureum (Lindl.) Beer
- Oncidium luteum Rolfe
- Oncidium lutzii (Königer) M.W.Chase & N.H.Williams
- Oncidium lykaiosii R.Vásquez & Dodson

== M ==
- Oncidium macrobulbon (Kraenzl.) M.W.Chase & N.H.Williams
- Oncidium maculatum (Lindl.) Lindl.
- Oncidium × maderoanum J.M.H.Shaw
- Oncidium maduroi Dressler
- Oncidium magdalenae Rchb.f.
- Oncidium magnificum Senghas
- Oncidium maizifolium Lindl.
- Oncidium malleiferum (Rchb.f.) M.W.Chase & N.H.Williams
- Oncidium mandritum (Szlach. & Kolan.) J.M.H.Shaw
- Oncidium manningianum Königer
- Oncidium mantense Dodson & R.Estrada
- Oncidium manuelariasii M.W.Chase & N.H.Williams
- Oncidium marinii (Königer) M.W.Chase & N.H.Williams
- Oncidium × marriottianum (Rchb.f.) M.W.Chase & N.H.Williams
- Oncidium martinezii Königer
- Oncidium massangei É.Morren
- Oncidium mathieuanum Rchb.f. & Warsz.
- Oncidium medinense (Campacci) J.M.H.Shaw
- Oncidium mexicanum (L.O.Williams) M.W.Chase & N.H.Williams
- Oncidium micklowii (Dalström) M.W.Chase & N.H.Williams
- Oncidium microstigma Rchb.f.
- Oncidium millianum Rchb.f.
- Oncidium minaxoides M.W.Chase & N.H.Williams
- Oncidium mirandoides M.W.Chase & N.H.Williams
- Oncidium mirandum (Rchb.f.) M.W.Chase & N.H.Williams
- Oncidium mixturum (Dalström & Sönnemark) M.W.Chase & N.H.Williams
- Oncidium morganii (Dodson) M.W.Chase & N.H.Williams
- Oncidium multistellare (Rchb.f.) M.W.Chase & N.H.Williams
- Oncidium × mulus (Rchb.f.) M.W.Chase & N.H.Williams
- Oncidium × murrellianum (Rchb.f.) M.W.Chase & N.H.Williams

== N ==
- Oncidium naevium (Lindl.) Beer
- Oncidium nebulosum Lindl.
- Oncidium neovierlingii J.M.H.Shaw
- Oncidium nevadense (Rchb.f.) M.W.Chase & N.H.Williams
- Oncidium niesseniae Königer
- Oncidium nigratum Lindl. & Paxton
- Oncidium nobile (Rchb.f.) M.W.Chase & N.H.Williams
- Oncidium noezlianum (Mast.) M.W.Chase & N.H.Williams

== O ==
- Oncidium oblongatum Lindl.
- Oncidium obryzatoides Kraenzl.
- Oncidium obryzatum Rchb.f. & Warsz.
- Oncidium obstipum Königer & Posada
- Oncidium odoratum (Lindl.) Beer
- Oncidium oliganthum (Rchb.f.) L.O.Williams ex Correll
- Oncidium orbatum Kraenzl.
- Oncidium ornithocephalum Lindl.
- Oncidium ornithopodum Rchb.f.
- Oncidium ornithorhynchum Kunth
- Oncidium orthostatoides D.E.Benn. & Christenson
- Oncidium orthotis Rchb.f.
- Oncidium oviedomotae Hágsater
- Oncidium oxyceras (Königer & J.G.Weinm.) M.W.Chase & N.H.Williams

== P ==
- Oncidium panamense Schltr.
- Oncidium panchrysum Lindl.
- Oncidium panduratoides M.W.Chase & N.H.Williams
- Oncidium panduratum Rolfe
- Oncidium papilioides M.W.Chase & N.H.Williams
- Oncidium parviflorum L.O.Williams
- Oncidium × pauwelsii (Rolfe) J.M.H.Shaw
- Oncidium peltiforme Königer
- Oncidium pentadactylon Lindl.
- Oncidium pergameneum Lindl.
- Oncidium perpusillum (Kraenzl.) M.W.Chase & N.H.Williams
- Oncidium pichinchense (Dodson) M.W.Chase & N.H.Williams
- Oncidium pictum Kunth
- Oncidium picturatissimum (Kraenzl.) M.W.Chase & N.H.Williams
- Oncidium picturatum Rchb.f.
- Oncidium planilabre Lindl.
- Oncidium platychilum Schltr.
- Oncidium platynaris (Dalström) M.W.Chase & N.H.Williams
- Oncidium poikilostalix (Kraenzl.) M.W.Chase & N.H.Williams
- Oncidium polyadenium Lindl.
- Oncidium polycladium Rchb.f. ex Lindl.
- Oncidium pongratzianum Königer & J.Portilla
- Oncidium portillae Königer
- Oncidium portillaellum M.W.Chase & N.H.Williams
- Oncidium portilloides M.W.Chase & N.H.Williams
- Oncidium portmannii (Bockemühl) M.W.Chase & N.H.Williams
- Oncidium posadaroides M.W.Chase & N.H.Williams
- Oncidium posadarum Königer
- Oncidium povedanum (P.Ortiz) M.W.Chase & N.H.Williams
- Oncidium praenitens (Rchb.f.) M.W.Chase & N.H.Williams
- Oncidium praestanoides M.W.Chase & N.H.Williams
- Oncidium × praevisum (Rolfe) J.M.H.Shaw
- Oncidium pseudounguiculatum (Pupulin & Dressler) M.W.Chase & N.H.Williams
- Oncidium punctulatum Dressler
- Oncidium putumayense (P.Ortiz) M.W.Chase & N.H.Williams

== R ==
- Oncidium reflexum Lindl.
- Oncidium regentianum J.M.H.Shaw
- Oncidium reichenheimii (Linden & Rchb.f.) Garay & Stacy
- Oncidium renatoi (Königer) M.W.Chase & N.H.Williams
- Oncidium retusum Lindl.
- Oncidium reversoides M.W.Chase & N.H.Williams
- Oncidium reversum (Rchb.f.) M.W.Chase & N.H.Williams
- Oncidium rhynchanthum (Rchb.f.) M.W.Chase & N.H.Williams
- Oncidium rionegrense Archila & Chiron
- Oncidium rodrigoi Königer
- Oncidium × rolfei J.M.H.Shaw
- Oncidium romanii Königer
- Oncidium roseoides M.W.Chase & N.H.Williams
- Oncidium rutkisii Foldats

== S ==
- Oncidium sarahforsythiae J.M.H.Shaw
- Oncidium sathishkumarii J.M.H.Shaw
- Oncidium savegrensis (Pupulin) M.W.Chase & N.H.Williams
- Oncidium saxicola Schltr.
- Oncidium schildhaueri Königer
- Oncidium schillerianum Rchb.f.
- Oncidium schroederianum (O'Brien) Garay & Stacy
- Oncidium sengerorum (Königer) J.M.H.Shaw
- Oncidium sergii (P.Ortiz) M.W.Chase & N.H.Williams
- Oncidium sessile Lindl. & Paxton
- Oncidium silvanoi Königer
- Oncidium sipaliwinense (Szlach. & Kolan.) J.M.H.Shaw
- Oncidium sotoanum R.Jiménez & Hágsater
- Oncidium spectatissimum (Lindl.) M.W.Chase & N.H.Williams
- Oncidium sphacelatum Lindl.
- Oncidium stelligerum Rchb.f.
- Oncidium × stellimicans (Rchb.f.) M.W.Chase & N.H.Williams
- Oncidium stenobulbon Kraenzl.
- Oncidium stenoglossum (Schltr.) Dressler & N.H.Williams
- Oncidium storkii Ames & C.Schweinf.
- Oncidium strictum (Cogn.) M.W.Chase & N.H.Williams
- Oncidium subnivalis (Szlach. & Kolan.) J.M.H.Shaw
- Oncidium subuligerum (Rchb.f.) M.W.Chase & N.H.Williams
- Oncidium surinamense (Szlach. & Kolan.) J.M.H.Shaw

== T ==
- Oncidium tectum Rchb.f.
- Oncidium tenellum F.Gérard
- Oncidium tenuifolium (Dalström) M.W.Chase & N.H.Williams
- Oncidium tenuipes Kraenzl.
- Oncidium tenuirostre (Kraenzl.) M.W.Chase & N.H.Williams
- Oncidium tenuoides M.W.Chase & N.H.Williams
- Oncidium tetrotis Rchb.f. & Warsz.
- Oncidium tigratum Rchb.f. & Warsz.
- Oncidium tigrinum Lex.
- Oncidium tigroides (C.Schweinf.) M.W.Chase & N.H.Williams
- Oncidium tipuloides Rchb.f.
- Oncidium toachicum Dodson
- Oncidium tolimense Sierra-Ariza & Albino-Bohórq.
- Oncidium trachycaulon Schltr.
- Oncidium trimorion (Königer) M.W.Chase & N.H.Williams
- Oncidium trinasutum Kraenzl.
- Oncidium tripudians (Rchb.f. & Warsz.) M.W.Chase & N.H.Williams
- Oncidium tsubotae Königer

== U ==
- Oncidium uncinatum (Pupulin, G.Merino & J.Valle) J.M.H.Shaw
- Oncidium undatiflorum (Ruiz & Pav.) Pupulin
- Oncidium unguiculatum Lindl.
- Oncidium unguiculoides M.W.Chase & N.H.Williams
- Oncidium universitas-cuencae Königer & D.Vázquez
- Oncidium uribei (Szlach. & Kolan.) J.M.H.Shaw

== V ==
- Oncidium vallecaucanum (Szlach. & Kolan.) J.M.H.Shaw
- Oncidium velleum (Rchb.f.) M.W.Chase & N.H.Williams
- Oncidium vernixium Linden & Rchb.f.
- Oncidium vierlingii (Senghas) M.W.Chase & N.H.Williams
- Oncidium vulcanicum (Rchb.f.) M.W.Chase & N.H.Williams

== W ==
- Oncidium wallisii (Linden & Rchb.f.) M.W.Chase & N.H.Williams
- Oncidium wallisoides M.W.Chase & N.H.Williams
- Oncidium warszewiczii Rchb.f.
- Oncidium × wattianum (Rolfe) J.M.H.Shaw
- Oncidium weddellii Lindl.
- Oncidium weinmannianum (Königer) M.W.Chase & N.H.Williams
- Oncidium wentworthianum Bateman ex Lindl.
- Oncidium × wilckeanum (Rchb.f.) M.W.Chase & N.H.Williams
- Oncidium wyattianum (A.G.Wilson) M.W.Chase & N.H.Williams

== X ==
- Oncidium xanthornis Rchb.f. ex Kraenzl.

== Z ==
- Oncidium zelenkoanum Dressler & Pupulin
- Oncidium zimmermanniana (Königer) J.M.H.Shaw
