= Odontoglossum =

Former genus of orchids

Odontoglossum, first named in 1816 by Karl Sigismund Kunth, is a formerly accepted genus of orchids that is now regarded as a synonym of Oncidium. Several hundred species have previously been placed in Odontoglossum. The scientific name of the genus is derived from the Greek words odon (tooth) and glossa (tongue), referring to the two tooth-like calluses on the base of the lip. Species formerly placed in this genus are cool to cold growing orchids to be found on open spots in the humid cloud forest at higher elevations from Central- and West South America to Guyana, with most species around the northern Andes. The abbreviation for this genus is Odm. in the horticultural trade. Many of the species formerly placed in the genus are in great demand with orchid lovers because of their spectacular and flamboyant flowers.

== Description ==
Most species formerly placed in the genus are sympodial epiphytes, or rarely terrestrials. The pseudobulbs are compact with leaf-like bracts at the base. They give one to three apical leaves. An arching (and sometimes erect) inflorescence grows from its base. The ruffled sepals and petals of these spectacular flowers are spreading. The lip is rather complex, entire or with three lobes. It stands erect or parallel to the long column. The high altitude species show long inflorescences with up to 150 flowers (as in O. cirrhosum), while the lower altitude species have shorter inflorescences with up to 20 flowers. These flowers may be white, red, purple, brown, yellow, or even be blotched with a showy blend of many colors.

== Former species ==
This genus used to contain more than 400 species. Many have now been reclassified in other genera such as Aspasia, Cuitlauzina, Cyrtochilum, Gomesa, Miltonia, Oliveriana, Oncidium, Otoglossum, Rhynchostele and Rossioglossum. These new genera occurred outside the Andes in different climatological habitats.

Many species have been transferred to Oncidium:

- Odontoglossum alberti P.Ortiz = Oncidium alberti
- Odontoglossum alvarezii P.Ortiz = Oncidium alvarezii
- Odontoglossum ariasii Dalström = Oncidium manuelariasii
- Odontoglossum armatum Rchb.f. = Oncidium armatum
- Odontoglossum aspidorhinum F.Lehm. = Oncidium aspidorhinum
- Odontoglossum astranthum Linden & Rchb.f. = Oncidium astranthum
- Odontoglossum aurarium = Oncidium aurarium
- Odontoglossum auriculatum Rolfe = Oncidium auriculatum
- Odontoglossum blandum Rchb.f. = Oncidium blandum
- Odontoglossum boddaertianum Rchb.f. = Oncidium constrictum
- Odontoglossum callacallaense D.E.Benn. & Christenson = Oncidium callacallaense
- Odontoglossum cirrhosum Lindl. = Oncidium cirrhosum
- Odontoglossum constrictum Lindl. = Oncidium constrictum
- Odontoglossum contaypacchaense D.E.Benn. & Christenson = Oncidium contaypacchaense
- Odontoglossum crinitum Rchb.f. = Oncidium crinitum
- Odontoglossum crispum Lindl. = Oncidium alexandrae
- Odontoglossum cristatellum Rchb.f. = Oncidium cristatellum
- Odontoglossum cristatum Lindl. in G.Bentham = Oncidium cristatum
- Odontoglossum crocidipterum Rchb.f. = Oncidium crocidipterum
- Odontoglossum cruentum Rchb.f. = Oncidium cruentoides
- Odontoglossum digitatum C.Schweinf. = Oncidium digitoides
- Odontoglossum dormanianum Rchb.f. = Oncidium crocidipterum
- Odontoglossum dracoceps Dalström = Oncidium dracoceps
- Odontoglossum epidendroides Kunth = Oncidium epidendroides
- Odontoglossum gloriosum Linden & Rchb.f. = Oncidium gloriosum
- Odontoglossum gramazuense D.E.Benn. & Christenson = Oncidium gramazuense
- Odontoglossum hallii Lindl. = Oncidium hallii
- Odontoglossum harryanum Rchb.f. = Oncidium harryanum
- Odontoglossum hauensteinii Königer = Oncidium hauensteinii
- Odontoglossum helgae Königer = Oncidium gayi
- Odontoglossum heterosepalum = Oncidium heterosepalum
- Odontoglossum hrubyanum Rchb.f. = Oncidium cruentoides
- Odontoglossum juninense Schltr. = Oncidium juninense
- Odontoglossum kegeljanii E.Morren = Oncidium kegeljanii
- Odontoglossum lindleyanum Rchb.f. & Warsz. = Oncidium lindleyoides
- Odontoglossum llanachagaense D.E.Benn. & Christenson = Oncidium llanachagaense
- Odontoglossum lucianianum Rchb.f. = Oncidium lucianianum
- Odontoglossum luteopurpureum Lindl. = Oncidium luteopurpureum
- Odontoglossum machupicchuense D.E.Benn. & Christenson = Oncidium machupicchuense
- Odontoglossum mapiriense Mansf. = Oncidium aurarium
- Odontoglossum micklowii Dalström = Oncidium micklowii
- Odontoglossum mirandum Rchb.f. = Oncidium mirandum
- Odontoglossum multistellare Rchb.f. = Oncidium multistellare
- Odontoglossum naevium Lindl. = Oncidium naevium
- Odontoglossum nevadense Rchb.f. = Oncidium nevadense
- Odontoglossum nobile Rchb.f. = Oncidium nobile
- Odontoglossum odoratum Lindl. = Oncidium odoratum
- Odontoglossum platynaris Dalström = Oncidium platynaris
- Odontoglossum portillae Bockemühl = Oncidium portillae
- Odontoglossum portmannii Bockemühl = Oncidium portmannii
- Odontoglossum povedanum P.Ortiz = Oncidium povedanum
- Odontoglossum praenitens Rchb.f. = Oncidium praenitens
- Odontoglossum praestans Rchb.f. & Warsz. = Oncidium praestanoides
- Odontoglossum reversum Bockemühl = Oncidium reversum
- Odontoglossum rhynchanthum Rchb.f. = Oncidium rhynchanthum
- Odontoglossum sanderianum Rchb.f. = Oncidium constrictum
- Odontoglossum sceptrum Rchb.f. & Warsz. = Oncidium sceptrum
- Odontoglossum schillerianum Rchb.f. = Oncidium schillerianum
- Odontoglossum spectatissimum Lindl. = Oncidium spectatissimum
- Odontoglossum subuligerum Rchb.f. = Oncidium subuligerum
- Odontoglossum tenue Cogn. = Oncidium tenuoides
- Odontoglossum tenuifolium Dalström = Oncidium tenuifolium
- Odontoglossum tripudians Rchb.f. & Warsz. = Oncidium tripudians
- Odontoglossum velleum Rchb.f. = Oncidium velleum
- Odontoglossum vierlingii Senghas = Oncidium vierlingii
- Odontoglossum wallisii Linden & Rchb.f. = Oncidium wallisii
- Odontoglossum wyattianum Gurney Wilson = Oncidium wyattianum

== Intergeneric hybrids ==
Odontoglossum lent itself to the production of many artificial intergeneric hybrids. The hybrids with red pigmentation are nearly all derived from a crossing with species formerly placed in the genus Cochlioda and especially with Oncidium noezlianum (syn. Cochlioda noezliana).

Given the merge of Odontoglossum and Cochlioda into Oncidium, most of following nothogenus names are obsolete:

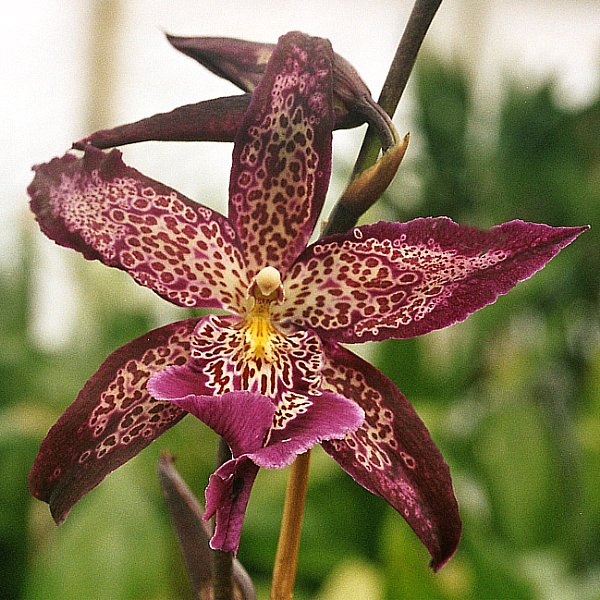
xBeallara "Marfitch Howards Dream"

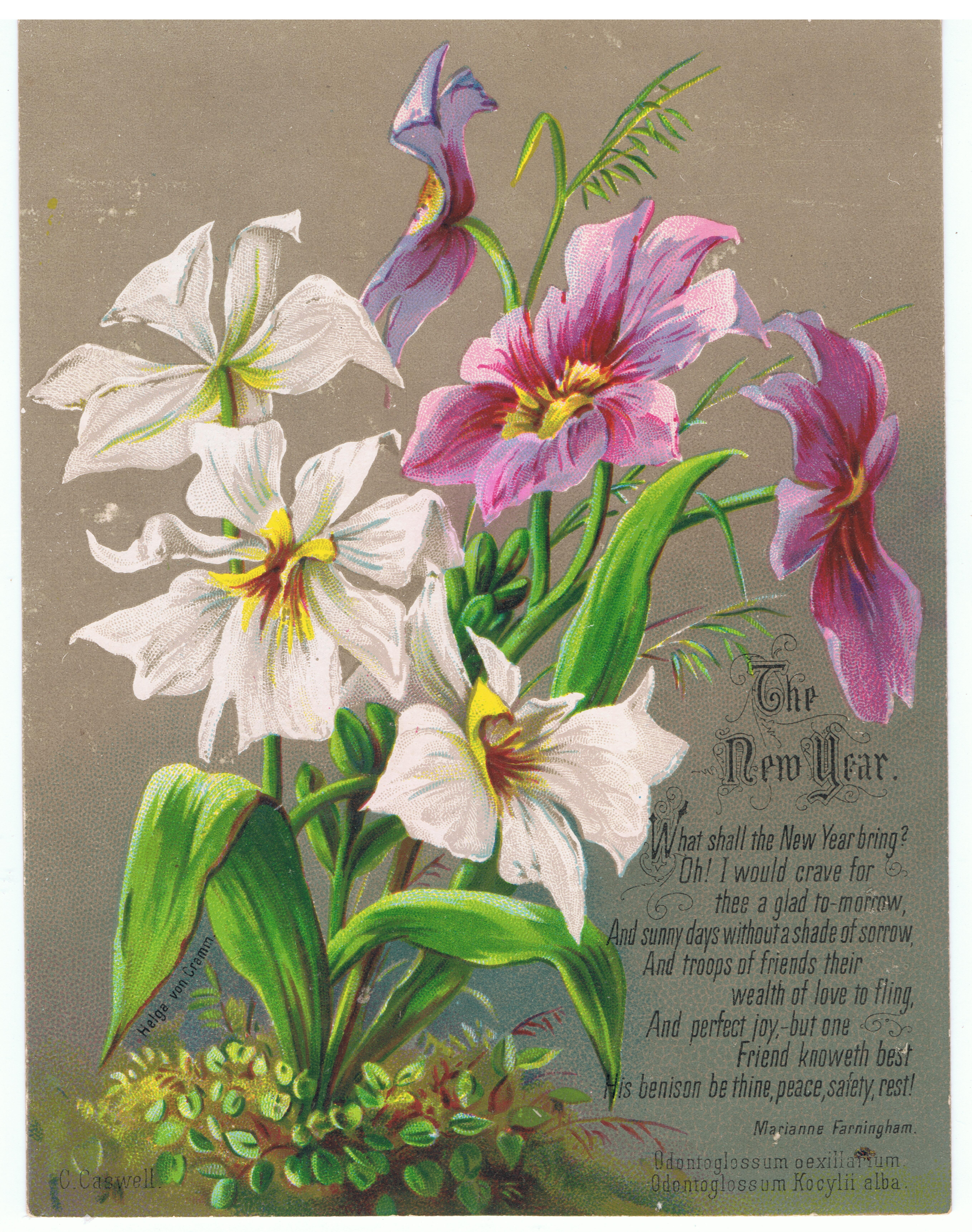
New Year card by Helga von Cramm. Prayer by Marianne Farningham. (4.25 x 5.5 inches). c. 1880.

- xAdaglossum : Ada x Odontoglossum
- xAlexanderara : Brassia x Cochlioda x Odontoglossum x Oncidium
- xAndreettara J.M.H.Shaw : Cochlioda x Miltonia x Odontoglossum
- xAspodonia : Aspasia x Miltonia x Odontoglossum
- xBakerara : Brassia x Miltonia x Odontoglossum x Oncidium
- xBaldwinara : Aspasia x Cochlioda x Odontoglossum x Oncidium
- xBanfieldara : Ada x Brassia x Odontoglossum
- xBarbosaara : Cochlioda x Gomesa x Odontoglossum x Oncidium
- xBaumannara : Comparettia x Odontoglossum x Oncidium
- xBeallara : Brassia x Cochlioda x Miltonia x Odontoglossum
- xBiltonara : Ada x Cochlioda x Miltonia x Odontoglossum
- xBlackara : Aspasia x Cochlioda x Miltonia x Odontoglossum
- xBrassia R. Br. 1813 Cochlioda Lindl. 1853 × Miltonia Lindl. 1837 × Odontoglossum Kunth 1816
- xBrillandeara : Aspasia x Brassia x Cochlioda x Miltonia x Odontoglossum x Oncidium
- xBrummittara : Comparettia x Odontoglossum x Rodriguezia
- xBurkhardtara : Leochilus x Odontoglossum x Oncidium x Rodriguezia
- xBurrageara : Cochlioda x Miltonia x Odontoglossum x Oncidium
- xCambria : Brassia x Cochlioda x Miltonia x Oncidium x Odontoglossum
- xCampbellara : Odontoglossum x Oncidium x Rodriguezia
- xCarpenterara : Baptistonia x Odontoglossum x Oncidium
- xColmanara : Miltonia x Odontoglossum x Oncidium
- xDegarmoara : Brassia x Miltonia x Odontoglossum
- xDerosaara : Odontoglossum x Miltonia x Aspasia x Brassia
- xDoncollinara : Cochlioda x Odontoglossum x Rodriguezia
- xGomoglossum : Gomesa x Odontoglossum
- xGoodaleara : Brassia x Cochlioda x Miltonia x Odontoglossum x Oncidium
- xHamiltonara : Ada x Brassia x Cochlioda x Odontoglossum
- xKriegerara : Ada x Cochlioda x Odontoglossum x Oncidium
- xLagerara : Aspasia x Cochlioda x Odontoglossum
- xMaclellanara : Brassia x Odontoglossum x Oncidium
- xMaunderara : Ada x Cochlioda x Miltonia x Odontoglossum x Oncidium
- xMiltodontrum J.M.H.Shaw 2004 : (Miltonia Lindl. x Odontoglossum Kunth x Trichocentrum Poepp. & Endl.).
- xMorrisonara : Ada x Odontoglossum x Miltonia
- xOdontioda : Odontoglossum x Cochlioda
- xOdontobrassia : Brassia x Odontoglossum
- xOdontocentrum J.M.H.Shaw 2004 : (Odontoglossum Kunth x Trichocentrum Poepp. & Endl.).
- xOdontocidium : Odontoglossum x Oncidium
- xOdontokoa J.M.H.Shaw 2004 : (Odontoglossum Kunth x Zelenkoa M.W.Chase & N.H.Williams).
- xOdontonia : Miltonia x Odontoglossum
- xOdontopilia : Odontoglossum x Trichopilia
- xOdontorettia : Comparettia x Odontoglossum
- xOdontozelencidium J.M.H.Shaw 2004 : (Odontoglossum Kunth x Oncidium Sw. x Zelenkoa M.W.Chase & N.H.Williams).
- xRhyntonossum J.M.H.Shaw 2004 : (Miltonia Lindl. x Odontoglossum Kunth x Rhynchostele Rchb.f.).
- xRichardsonara : Aspasia x Odontoglossum x Oncidium
- xRoccaforteara : Odontoglossum x Aspasia x Brassia x Cochlioda
- xRodriglossum : Odontoglossum x Rodriguezia
- xRuppara : Gomesa x Odontoglossum x Oncidium
- xSanderara : Brassia x Cochlioda x Odontoglossum
- xSchafferara : Aspasia x Brassia x Cochlioda x Miltonia x Odontoglossum
- xSegerara : Aspasia x Cochlioda x Miltonia x Oncidium x Odontoglossum
- xShiveara : Aspasia x Brassia x Odontoglossum x Oncidium
- xStewartara : Ada x Cochlioda x Odontoglossum
- xVanalstyneara : Miltonia x Odontoglossum x Oncidium x Rodriguezia
- xVuylstekeara : Cochlioda x Miltonia x Odontoglossum
- xWatsonara J.M.H.Shaw 2004 : (Brassia R.Br. x Odontoglossum Kunth x Oncidium Sw. x Trichocentrum Poepp. & Endl.)
- xWilsonara : Cochlioda x Odontoglossum x Oncidium
- xWingfieldara : Aspasia x Brassia x Odontoglossum
- xWithnerara : Aspasia x Miltonia x Odontoglossum x Oncidium
