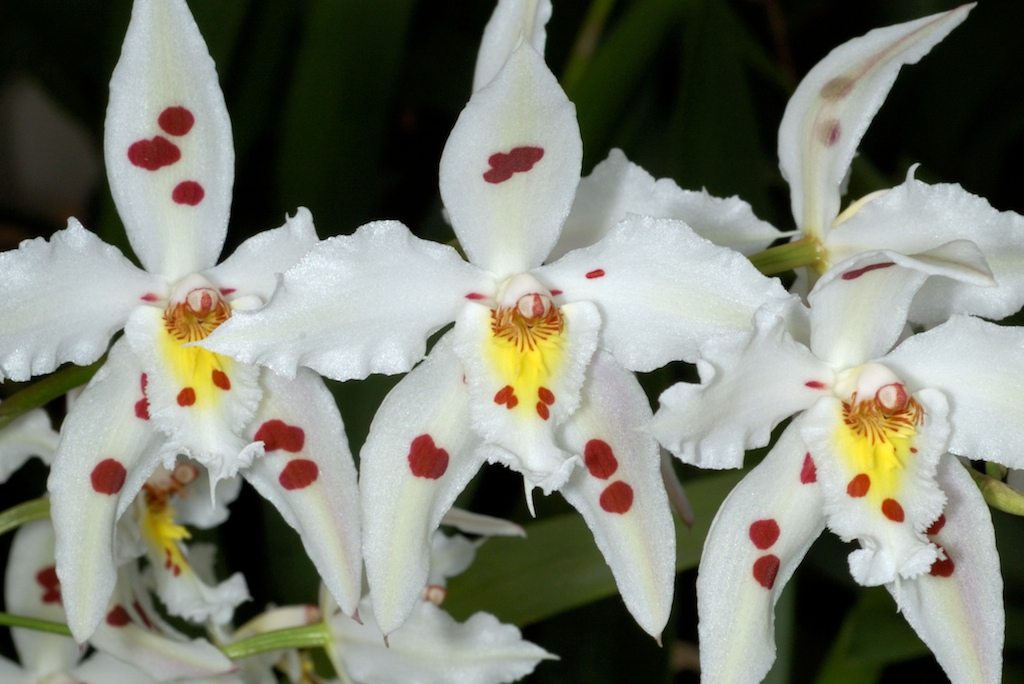

Scientific classification
- Kingdom: Plantae
- Clade: Tracheophytes
- Clade: Angiosperms
- Clade: Monocots
- Order: Asparagales
- Family: Orchidaceae
- Subfamily: Epidendroideae
- Genus: Oncidium
- Species: O. alexandrae

Binomial name
- Oncidium alexandrae (Bateman) M.W.Chase & N.H.Williams

Synonyms
- Odontoglossum alexandrae Bateman; Odontoglossum alexandrae var. cooksonii B.S.Williams & T.Moore; Odontoglossum alexandrae var. flaveolum (Rchb.f.) B.S.Williams & T.Moore; Odontoglossum alexandrae var. giganteum F.Buyss.; Odontoglossum alexandrae var. guttatum Hook.f.; Odontoglossum alexandrae var. outramii B.S.Williams; Odontoglossum alexandrae var. stevensii B.S.Williams & T.Moore; Odontoglossum alexandrae var. trianae Hook.f.; Odontoglossum alexandrae var. warneri F.Buyss.; Odontoglossum alexandrae var. wilsonii B.S.Williams; Odontoglossum bluntii Rchb.f.; Odontoglossum crispum Lindl.; Odontoglossum crispum var. bluntii (Rchb.f.) Stein; Odontoglossum crispum var. chestertonii A.H.Kent; Odontoglossum crispum var. flaveolum Rchb.f.; Odontoglossum crispum var. hyperxanthum Rchb.f.; Odontoglossum crispum var. latranum Bosschere; Odontoglossum crispum var. lehmannii Rchb.f.; Odontoglossum crispum var. lyntanthum F.Lehm.; Odontoglossum crispum var. plumatum B.S.Williams; Odontoglossum crispum var. reginae F.A.Philbrick; Odontoglossum crispum var. trianae (Hook.f.) L.Linden & Rodigas; Odontoglossum crispum var. wolstenholmiae Rchb.f.; Odontoglossum crispum var. wrigleyanum B.S.Williams; Odontoglossum edithiae R.Warner; Odontoglossum latimaculatum Linden; Odontoglossum reichenbachianum F.Lehm.; Odontoglossum warocqueanum Linden & L.Linden

= Oncidium alexandrae =

Species of orchid

Oncidium alexandrae, synonyms including Odontoglossum crispum, is an epiphytic orchid in the genus Oncidium. Known as the curled odontoglossum, it is considered by many to be the most beautiful orchid of all but is also one of the most difficult to grow.

== Description ==
Oncidium alexandrae has an ovoid pseudobulb, between 8 and 10 cm (3 and 4 in) long, from the apex of which emerge two soft-textured, erect to arching, linear to strap shaped or lanceolate leaves. The leaves are sharply pointed at the tip and narrowed below where they are longitudinally folded along the mid-vein at the base to form a long, narrow, petiole-like stem.

The gracefully arching flower spike, which can be up to 51 cm (20 in) long, emerges from the base of a recently matured pseudobulb along the centre-line of the upper basal sheath. Flowers are closely spaced in a raceme on the upper part of the flower spike, but there are often two or three lateral branches at the base of the raceme. Each flower is carried on a pedicellate ovary that is up to 23 mm (0.9 in) long.

There are between 6 and 24 flowers on each inflorescence. The blossoms are the most variable in the genus in terms of size, colour and degree of crimpling along the segment margins. The flowers are mostly white or pale rose, sometimes more or less spotted and blotched with brownish or reddish brown. The callus at the base of the lip is yellow and is often marked with red lines. The widely spread, flat-opening flowers are 8 to 10 cm (3 to 4 in) across with very wide sepals that are elliptic, have sharply pointed tips, often overlap and are variously crisped or wavy-margined or toothed and notched along the margins. The dorsal sepal is lanceolate to egg-shaped, undulate on the margin and 30 to 51 mm (1.2 to 2.0 in) long by 13 to 23 mm (0.5 to 0.9 in) wide. The obliquely spreading lateral sepals are similar in size to the dorsal sepal. The horizontally spreading petals are egg-shaped to elliptic or oblong elliptic, 30 to 46 mm (1.2 to 1.8 in) long by 18 to 38 mm (0.7 to 1.5 in) wide, and have margins that are wavy and fairly deeply notched or toothed. The lip is oblong or somewhat fiddle-shaped. It is 20 to 30 mm (0.8 to 1.2 in) long by 13 to 15 mm (0.5 to 0.6 in) wide, has toothed margins and is rather sharply pointed at the apex. The callus is fleshy with a pair of diverging lobes at the apex. The slender, slightly arching column is 15 to 18 mm (0.6 to 0.7 in) long and has a pair of broad wings with fringed margins toward the apex.

== Taxonomy ==
The species was first described by John Lindley in 1845 as Odontoglossum crispum. Independently, Bateman described Odontoglossum alexandrae, naming it after the then Princess of Wales, Alexandra of Denmark. The two are now considered synonyms. In 2008, the species was transferred to the genus Oncidium. The name Oncidium crispum had already been used in 1833 for a different species, so Bateman's epithet had to be used for the combination, producing the name Oncidium alexandrae.

=== Varieties and hybrids ===
Oncidium alexandrae shows many variations ranging from pure white to yellow to rose, including various highly spotted flowers. In the 1901 edition of his Orchid Guide, Sander described 108 varieties under the synonym Odontoglossum crispum and 27 natural hybrids having the species as a possible parent. No botanical varieties were accepted by Plants of the World Online as of August 2023.

Natural hybrids include:

- Oncidium × andersonianum (Rchb.f.) M.W.Chase & N.H.Williams (syn. Odontoglossum × andersonianum) – Oncidium alexandrae × Oncidium gloriosum
- Oncidium × coradinei (Rchb.f.) M.W.Chase & N.H.Williams (syn. Odontoglossum × coradinei) – Oncidium alexandrae × Oncidium lindleyoides
- Oncidium × marriottianum (Rchb.f.) M.W.Chase & N.H.Williams Rchb.f. (syn. Odontoglossum × marriottianum) – Oncidium alexandrae × Oncidium hallii
- Oncidium × wilckeanum (Rchb.f.) M.W.Chase & N.H.Williams Rchb.f. (syn. Odontoglossum × wilckeanum) – Oncidium alexandrae × Oncidium luteopurpureum

== Distribution and habitat ==
Oncidium alexandrae is found in the montane forest of Colombia, at altitudes of between 1,800 metres (6,000 ft) and 3,000 metres (10,000 ft), including in the eastern Cordillera in the departments of Cundinamarca and Boyacá and in the Andes of southern Colombia in the departments of Cauca, Putumayato and Nariño.

The plants grow as epiphytes in clearings and along forest edges. They grow chiefly on the trunks and main branches of oak trees in partial shade and occasionally full sun.

Throughout the year, days average 19–21 °C (66–70 °F) and nights average 10–12 °C (50–54 °F), with a diurnal range of 9–11 °C (16–20 °F). Rainfall is light to moderate throughout the year, but there is no actual dry season. In addition, more moisture is available from heavy dew and mist. Humidity is 70–75% throughout the year.

Oncidium alexandrae comes in an array of shapes, colours, and shades, from pure white to flush pink. The variability of the flower is associated with discrete areas; in the Pacho area (30 miles north of Bogotá) are found the finest varieties, full round pure white and spotted flowers with broad overlapping sepals and petals; in the Vélez area (further north) the flowers are similar but shaded rose; south of Bogotá, in the Fusagasugá region (25 miles south of Bogotá), the white mauve tinted stellate flowers; while in Nariño, a variant is found which bears up to 80 small flowers on a branched inflorescence.

== Discovery and introduction to Europe ==
The species was discovered in 1841 by Karl Theodor Hartweg, in the high Andes Mountains, near Pacho in the department of Cundinamarca, Colombia, during one of his plant collecting expeditions for the Royal Horticultural Society. It was named Odontoglossum crispum by John Lindley in 1945, crispum being a reference to the crisped edges of the flower.

None of the plants shipped from the 1841 expedition survived the trip back to England, and it was not until 1863 that the plant first flowered in England, once growers had been able to re-create the cool natural habitat of these "alpine" plants. English growers had initially believed that the Colombian tropics were hot and steaming jungles and tried to grow the plant in the hot-houses favoured by Victorian horticulturists. It was not until growers found how to lower the temperature of their glasshouses, by running water on the outside of the glass panels and having water dripping in front of the open sides to cool down the air, that the plant was able to survive and flower in England.

As orchid mania reached its height, several London orchid houses, including Rollisson of Tooting, Veitch of Chelsea, and Low of Clapton, sent out plant collectors to bring back samples of the species. Amongst the Veitch collectors were David Bowman, who successfully located it in Colombia in 1867, Henry Chesterton who discovered a variety that has been called var. chestertonii (named after him) in the late 1870s, Guillermo Kalbreyer, who in June 1881 "sent home a collection of Orchids, consisting principally of O. crispum", and David Burke, who collected in Colombia from 1894 to 1896.

In his book, About Orchids – A Chat published in 1893, Frederick Boyle describes the "harvesting" of the species from Colombia. The collector would make Bogotá his headquarters from where he would need to travel "about ten days to the southward" by mule. On reaching his destination, he would "hire a wood; that is, a track of mountain clothed more or less with timber" from a tribal chief. He would then hire "natives, twenty or fifty or a hundred, as circumstances advise" and set them to cut down all the trees. In the meantime, the collector would build "a wooden stage of sufficient length to bear the plunder expected" where he would clean, sort and dry the orchids. Each tree would produce between three and five usable specimens. He goes on to explain:

"It is a terribly wasteful process. If we estimate that a good tree has been felled for every three scraps of Odontoglossum which are now established in Europe, that will be no exaggeration. And for many years past they have been arriving by hundreds of thousands annually! But there is no alternative. A European cannot explore that green wilderness overhead; if he could, his accumulations would be so slow and costly as to raise the proceeds to an impossible figure. The natives will not climb, and they would tear the plants to bits. Timber has no value in those parts as yet, but the day approaches when Government must interfere."

Oncidium alexandrae (as Odontoglossum crispum) appears frequently in the illustrations of John Day in his scrapbooks – 40 times between 1865 and 1887. The species was highly sought after in Victorian times, both for the diversity of its flower colour and as a cool-growing species that could be successfully cultivated. By 1889, cultivated varieties were sold for more than 150 guineas at auction.

== Cultivation ==
Oncidium alexandrae thrives in cool, well watered, humid conditions, with medium to heavy shade. The plants grow best in a cool marine climate, such as the California fog belt or the Pacific Northwest. Elsewhere, high daytime temperatures enfeeble and destroy it, unless air-conditioning is available.

The species has been regularly used in hybridization, as it promotes flowers of good size and shape.

== Gallery ==
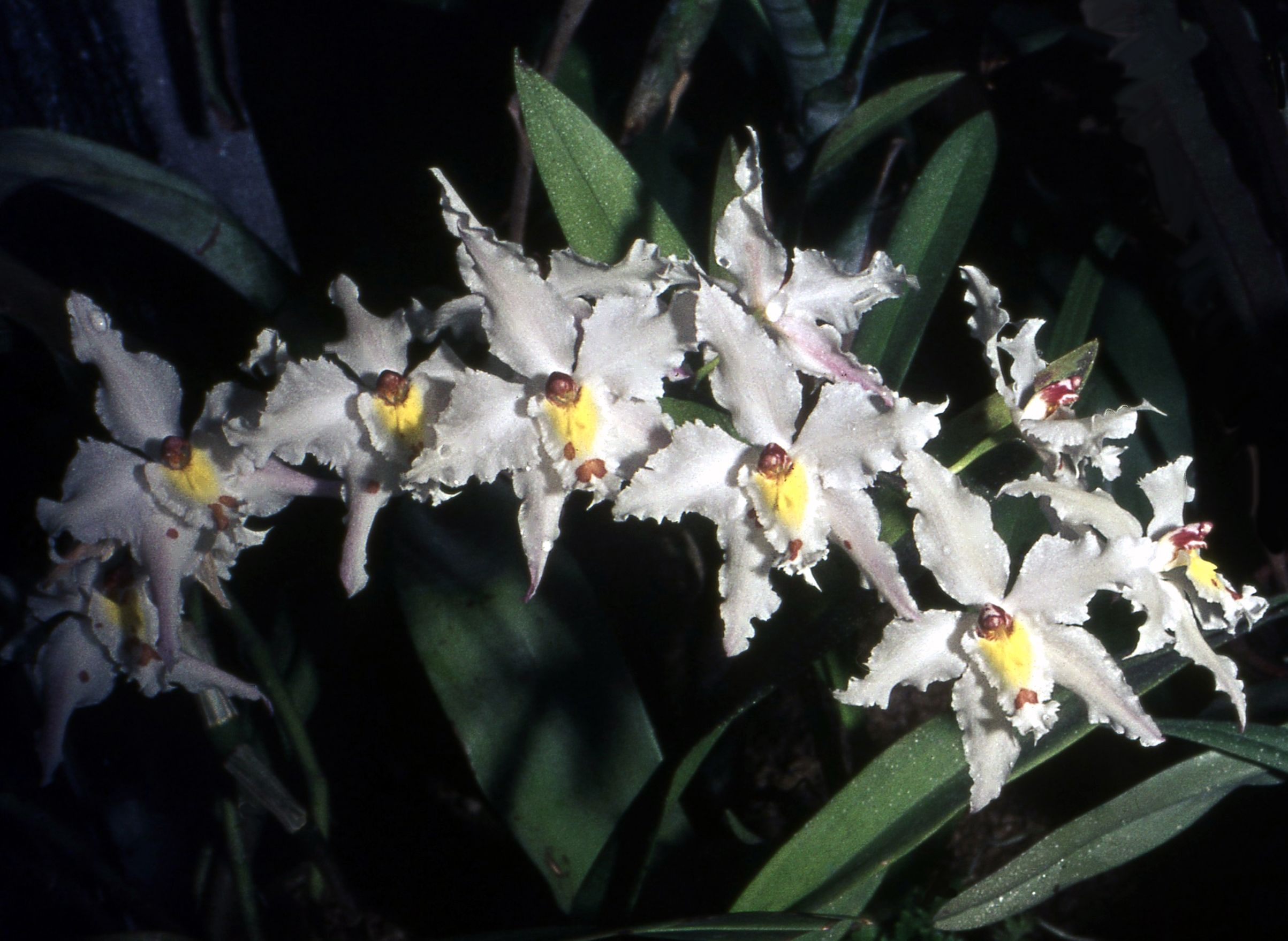
Flowers

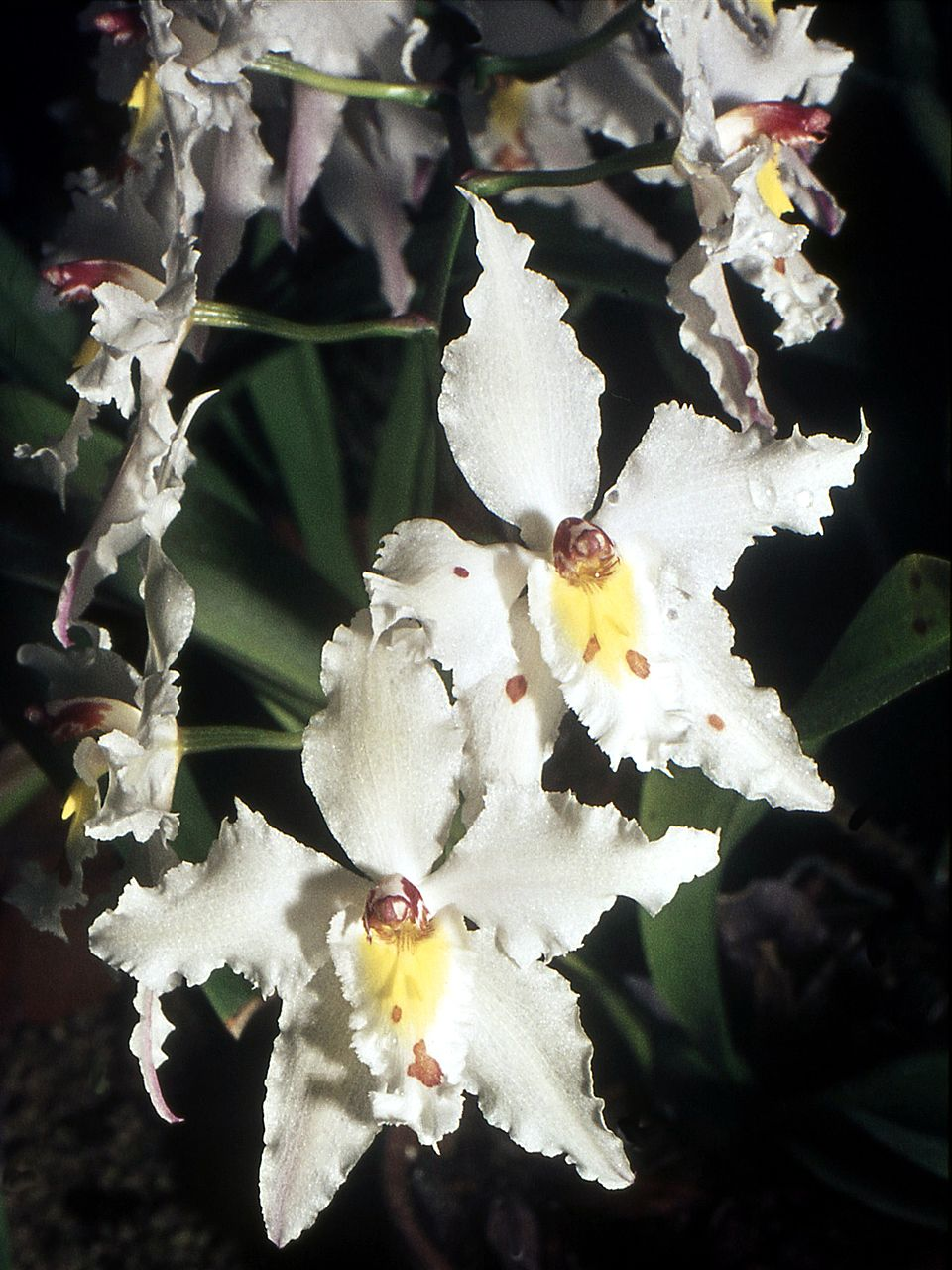
Flowers

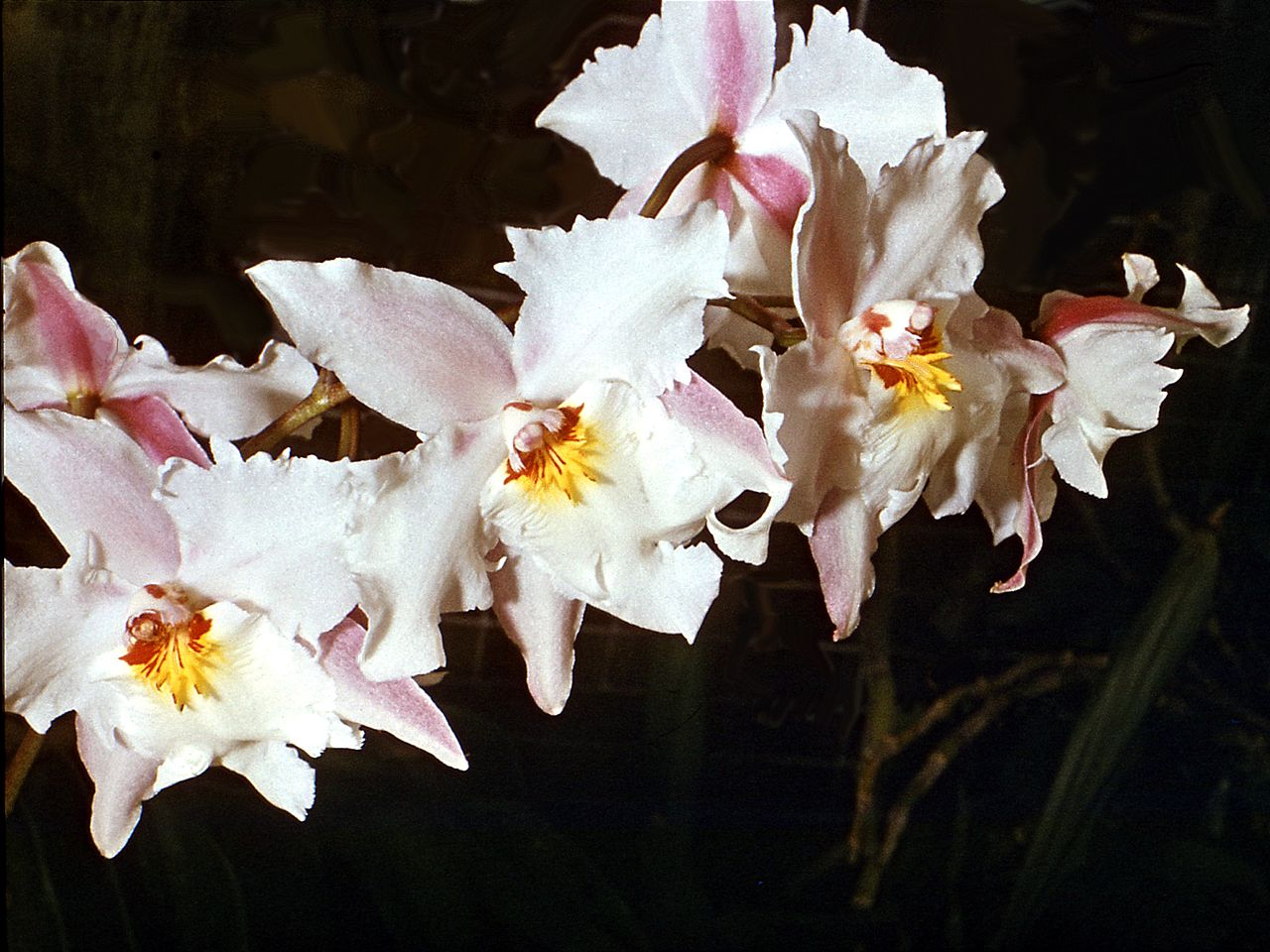
Pacho typus
flowers

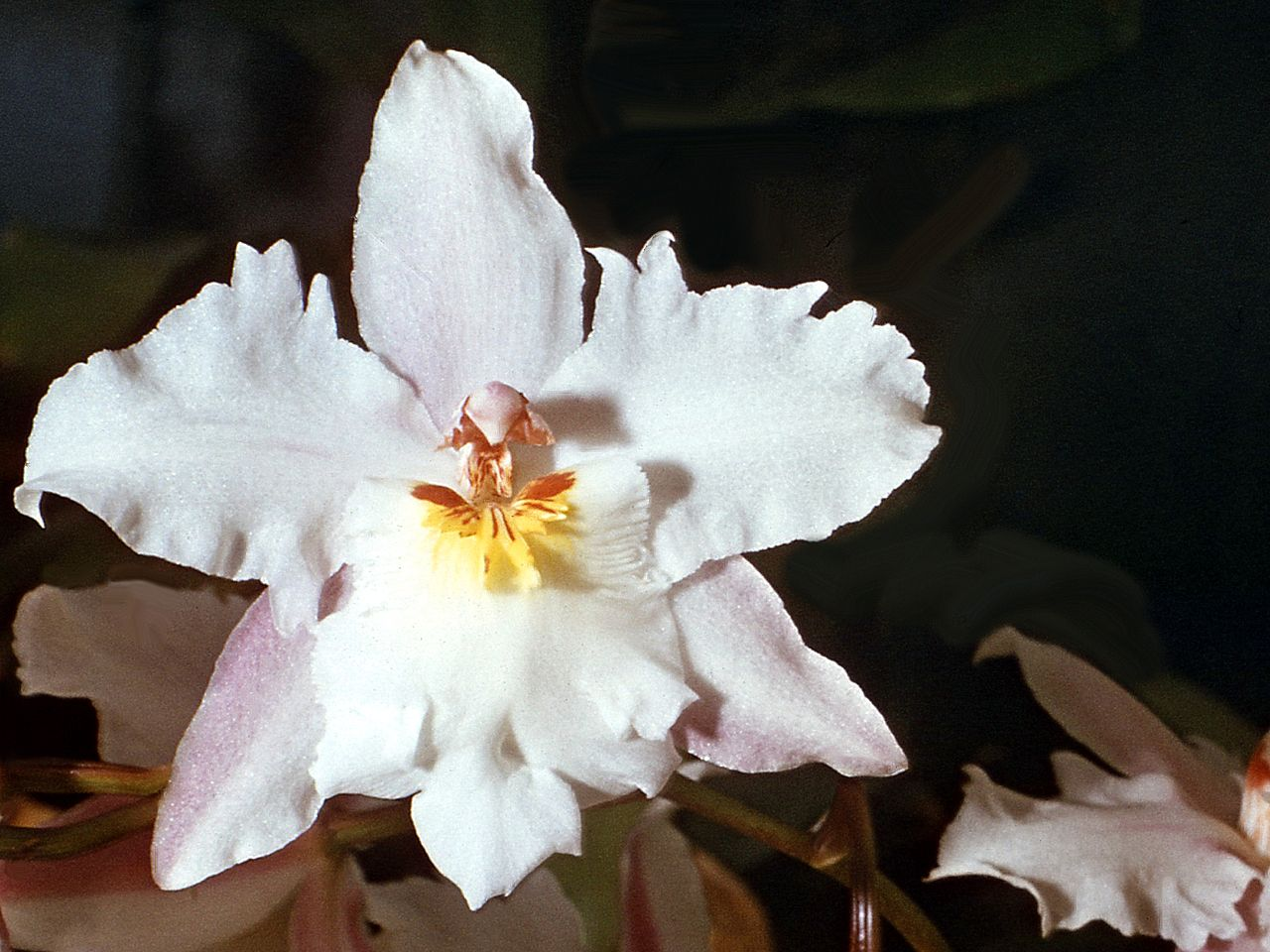
Pacho typus
flower

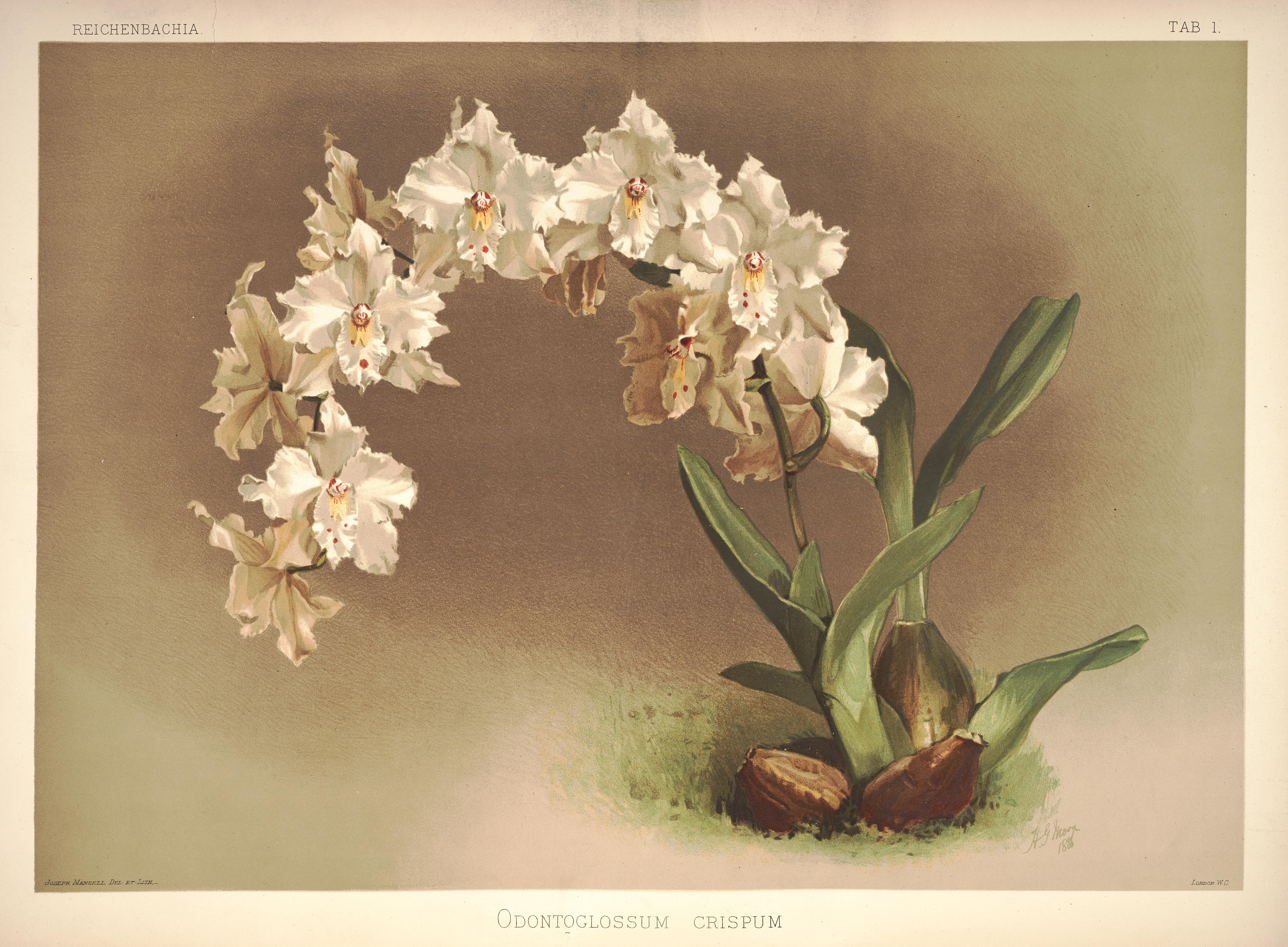
Illustration
