= Oncidium massangei =

Scientific classification
- Kingdom: Plantae
- Clade: Tracheophytes
- Clade: Angiosperms
- Clade: Monocots
- Order: Asparagales
- Family: Orchidaceae
- Subfamily: Epidendroideae
- Genus: Oncidium
- Species: O. massangei

Binomial name
- Oncidium massangei É.Morren

Species of plant

Oncidium massangei is a species of flowering plant in the orchid family Orchidaceae, endemic to Colombia. It was first described by Charles Jacques Édouard Morren in 1877.
