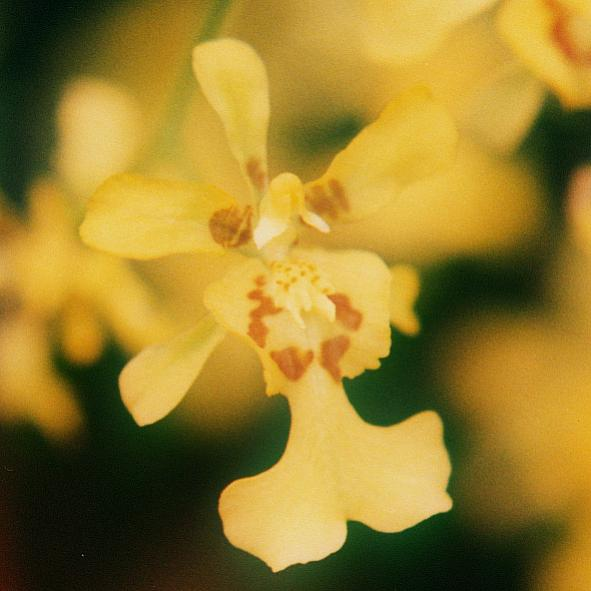

Scientific classification
- Kingdom: Plantae
- Clade: Tracheophytes
- Clade: Angiosperms
- Clade: Monocots
- Order: Asparagales
- Family: Orchidaceae
- Subfamily: Epidendroideae
- Genus: Oncidium
- Species: O. obryzatum

Binomial name
- Oncidium obryzatum Rchb.f. & Warsz.

Synonyms
- Odontoglossum obryzatum (Rchb.f. & Warsz.) Dalström & W.E.Higgins; Vitekorchis obryzata (Rchb.f. & Warsz.) Romowicz & Szlach

= Oncidium obryzatum =

Species of plant

Oncidium obryzatum is a species of flowering plant in the orchid family Orchidaceae, native to Colombia, Ecuador, Panama, Peru, and Venezuela. It was first described in 1854.
