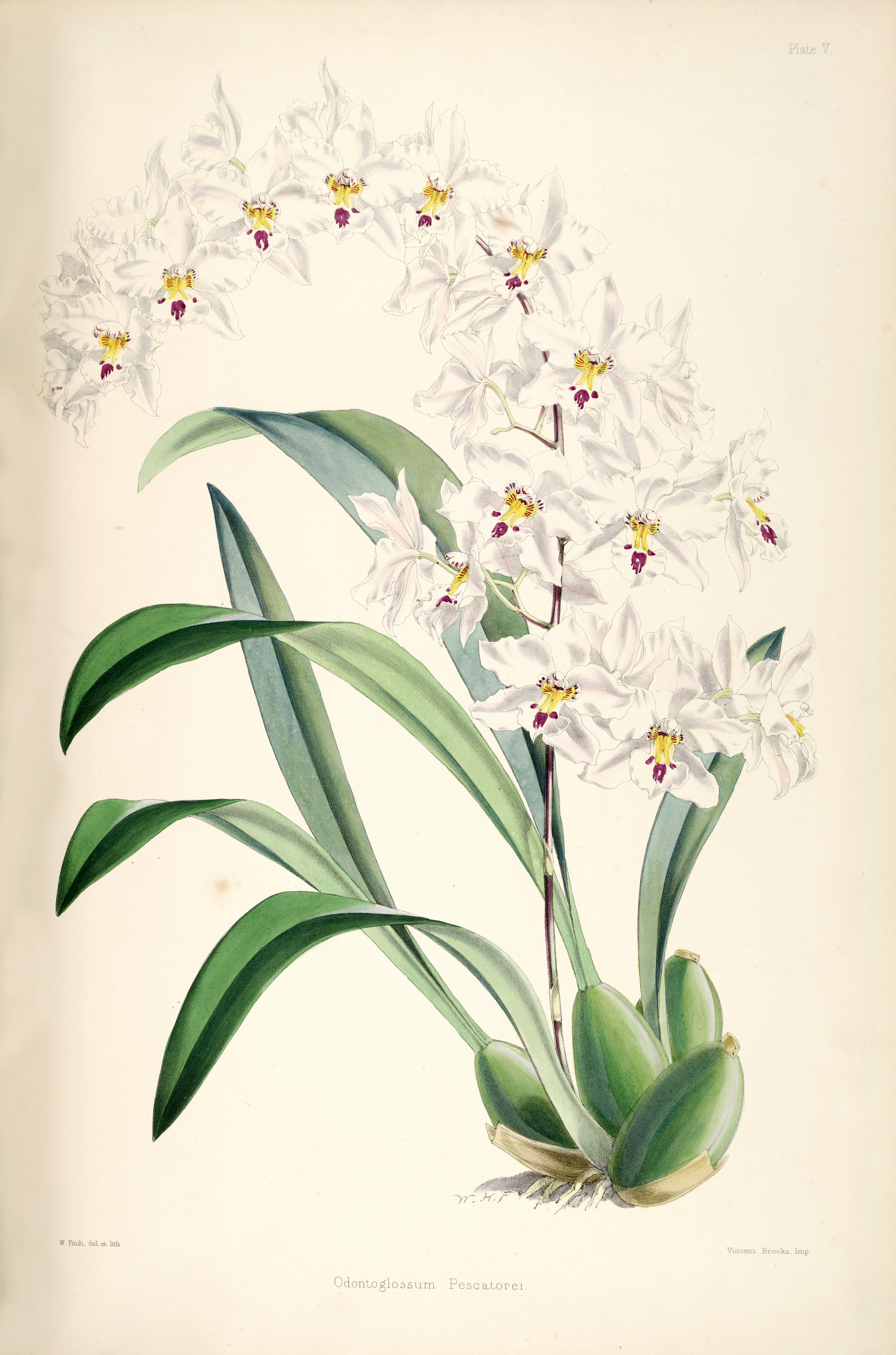

Scientific classification
- Kingdom: Plantae
- Clade: Tracheophytes
- Clade: Angiosperms
- Clade: Monocots
- Order: Asparagales
- Family: Orchidaceae
- Subfamily: Epidendroideae
- Genus: Oncidium
- Species: O. nobile

Binomial name
- Oncidium nobile (Rchb.f.) M.W.Chase & N.H.Williams

Synonyms
- Odontoglossum nobile Rchb.f.; Odontoglossum nobile var. leucoxanthum (Rchb.f.) Bockemühl; Odontoglossum nobile var. veitchianum (Rchb.f.) Bockemühl; Odontoglossum pescatorei var. germinyanum B.S.Williams; Oncidium pescatorei (Linden ex Lindl.) Beer; Odontoglossum pescatorei var. leucoxanthum Rchb.f.; Odontoglossum pescatorei var. lindenianum L.Linden & Rodigas; Odontoglossum pescatorei var. stupendum Rchb.f.; Odontoglossum pescatorei var. veitchianum Rchb.f.; Odontoglossum pescatorei var. veitchii Harpus-Crewe; Odontoglossum pescatorei Linden ex Lindl.

= Oncidium nobile =

Species of orchid

Oncidium nobile, synonym Odontoglossum nobile, is a species of orchid endemic to Colombia. It is known as the grand odontoglossum.
