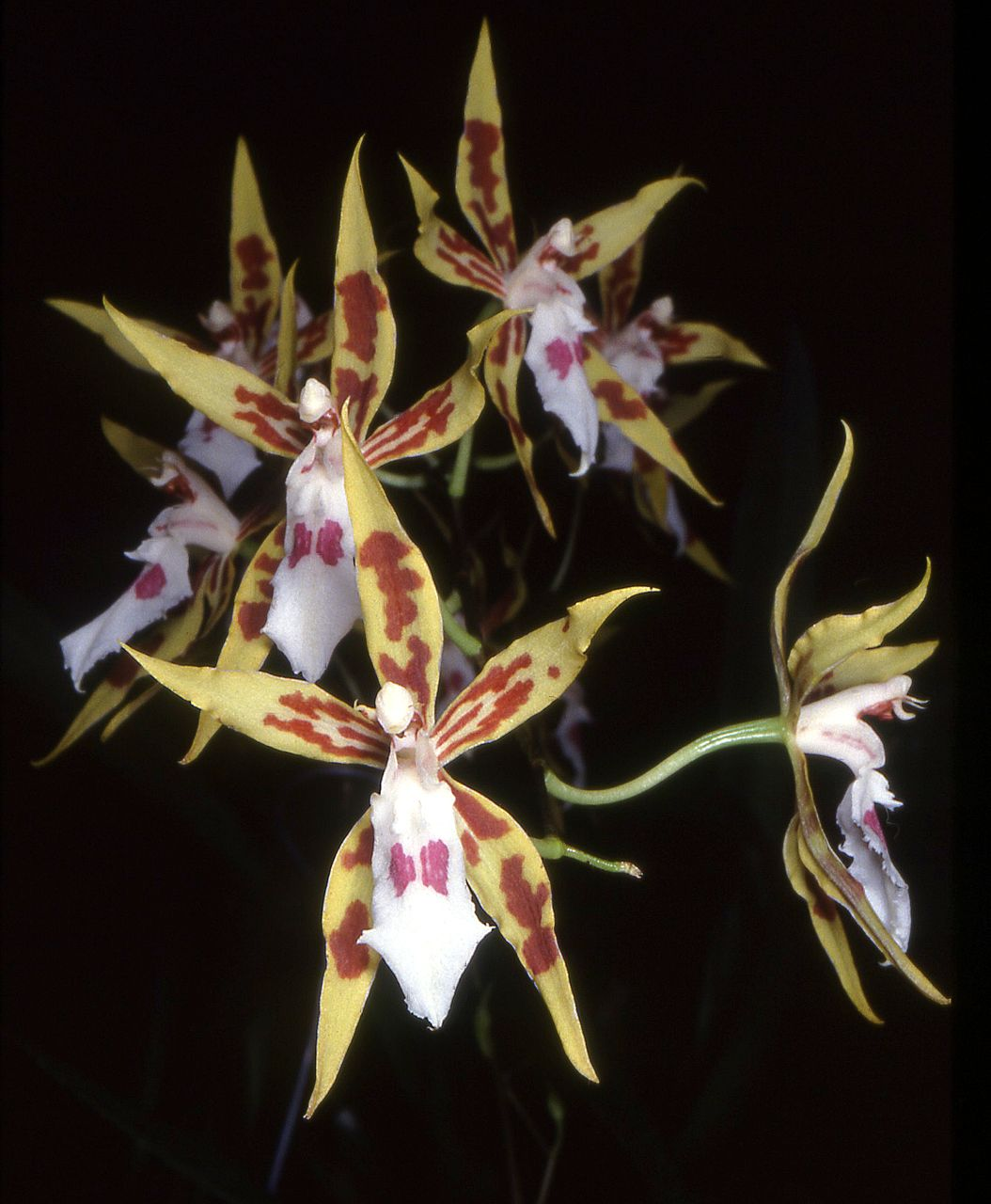

Scientific classification
- Kingdom: Plantae
- Clade: Tracheophytes
- Clade: Angiosperms
- Clade: Monocots
- Order: Asparagales
- Family: Orchidaceae
- Subfamily: Epidendroideae
- Genus: Oncidium
- Species: O. constrictum

Binomial name
- Oncidium constrictum (Lindl.) Beer

Synonyms
- Odontoglossum boddaertianum Rchb.f.; Odontoglossum constrictum Lindl.; Odontoglossum constrictum var. castaneum Rchb.f.; Odontoglossum constrictum var. majus Lindl.; Odontoglossum constrictum var. pallens Rchb.f.; Odontoglossum constrictum var. sanderianum (Rchb.f.) A.H.Kent; Odontoglossum sanderianum Rchb.f.; Oncidium boddaertianum (Rchb.f.) M.W.Chase & N.H.Williams

= Oncidium constrictum =

Species of orchid

Oncidium constrictum, synonym Odontoglossum constrictum, is a species of orchid found from Colombia to northern Venezuela.

== Description and habitat ==
Oncidium constrictum is a medium-sized flower measuring 3.75 centimeters with yellow brown sepals. The plant thrives in cool temperatures at an elevation of 1800–2300 meters above sea level.
