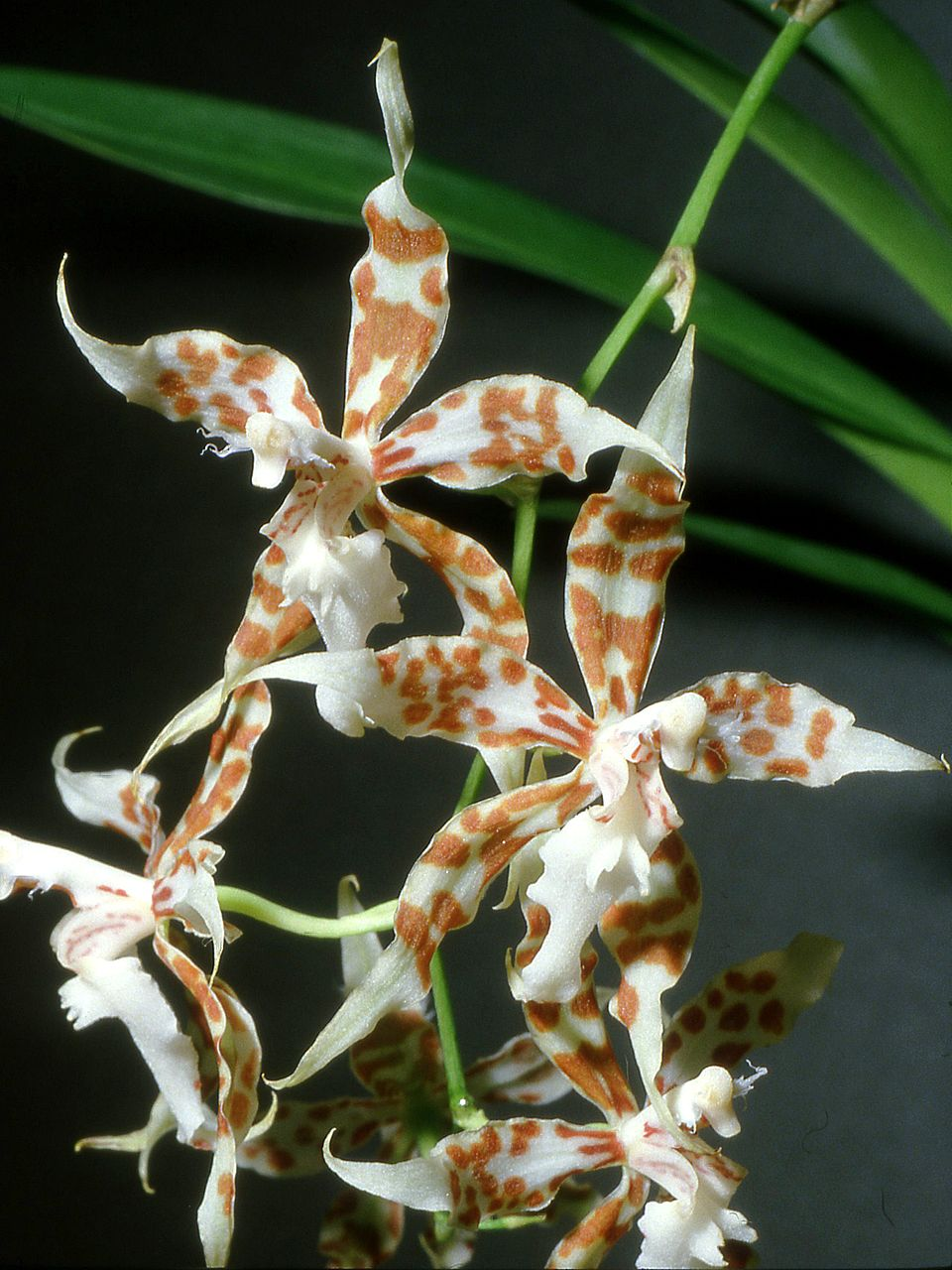

Scientific classification
- Kingdom: Plantae
- Clade: Tracheophytes
- Clade: Angiosperms
- Clade: Monocots
- Order: Asparagales
- Family: Orchidaceae
- Subfamily: Epidendroideae
- Genus: Oncidium
- Species: O. crocidipterum

Binomial name
- Oncidium crocidipterum (Rchb.f.) M.W.Chase & N.H.Williams

Synonyms
- Odontoglossum crocidipterum Rchb.f.; Odontoglossum crocidipterum subsp. dormanianum (Rchb.f.) Bockemühl; Odontoglossum dormanianum Rchb.f.; Oncidium crocidipterum subsp. dormanianum (Rchb.f.) M.W.Chase & N.H.Williams

= Oncidium crocidipterum =

Species of orchid

Oncidium crocidipterum, synonym Odontoglossum crocidipterum, is a species of orchid found in Peru, Colombia and northwestern Venezuela. Known as saffron-yellow two-winged odontoglossum, the species is generally found at elevations of 2,200 to 2,750 m (7,220 to 9,020 ft). As of August 2023, no subspecies are accepted by Plants of the World Online.
