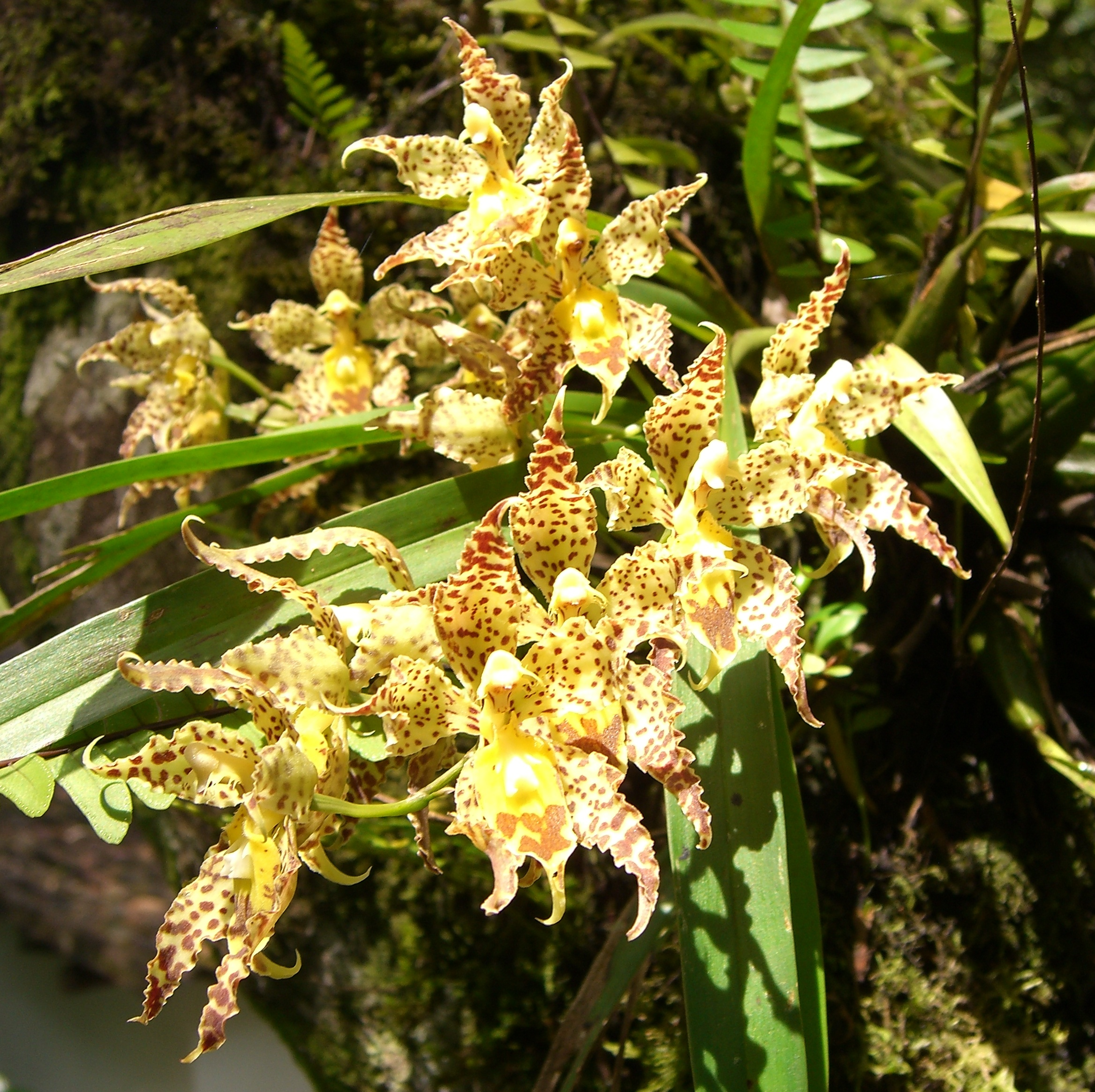

Scientific classification
- Kingdom: Plantae
- Clade: Tracheophytes
- Clade: Angiosperms
- Clade: Monocots
- Order: Asparagales
- Family: Orchidaceae
- Subfamily: Epidendroideae
- Genus: Oncidium
- Species: O. praestanoides

Binomial name
- Oncidium praestanoides M.W.Chase & N.H.Williams

Synonyms
- Odontoglossum praestans Rchb.f. & Warsz.; Odontoglossum praestans var. usemannii Roeth; Oncidium praestanoides var. usemannii (Roeth) J.M.H.Shaw

= Oncidium praestanoides =

Species of orchid

Oncidium praestanoides is a species of flowering plant in the family Orchidaceae, native to Bolivia, Colombia, Ecuador and Peru. It was first described by Heinrich Gustav Reichenbach and Josef Ritter Warszewicz in 1854 as Odontoglossum praestans. When transferred to Oncidium in 2008, the epithet praestans could not be used because it had already been published for a different species, so the replacement name O. praestanoides was used.
