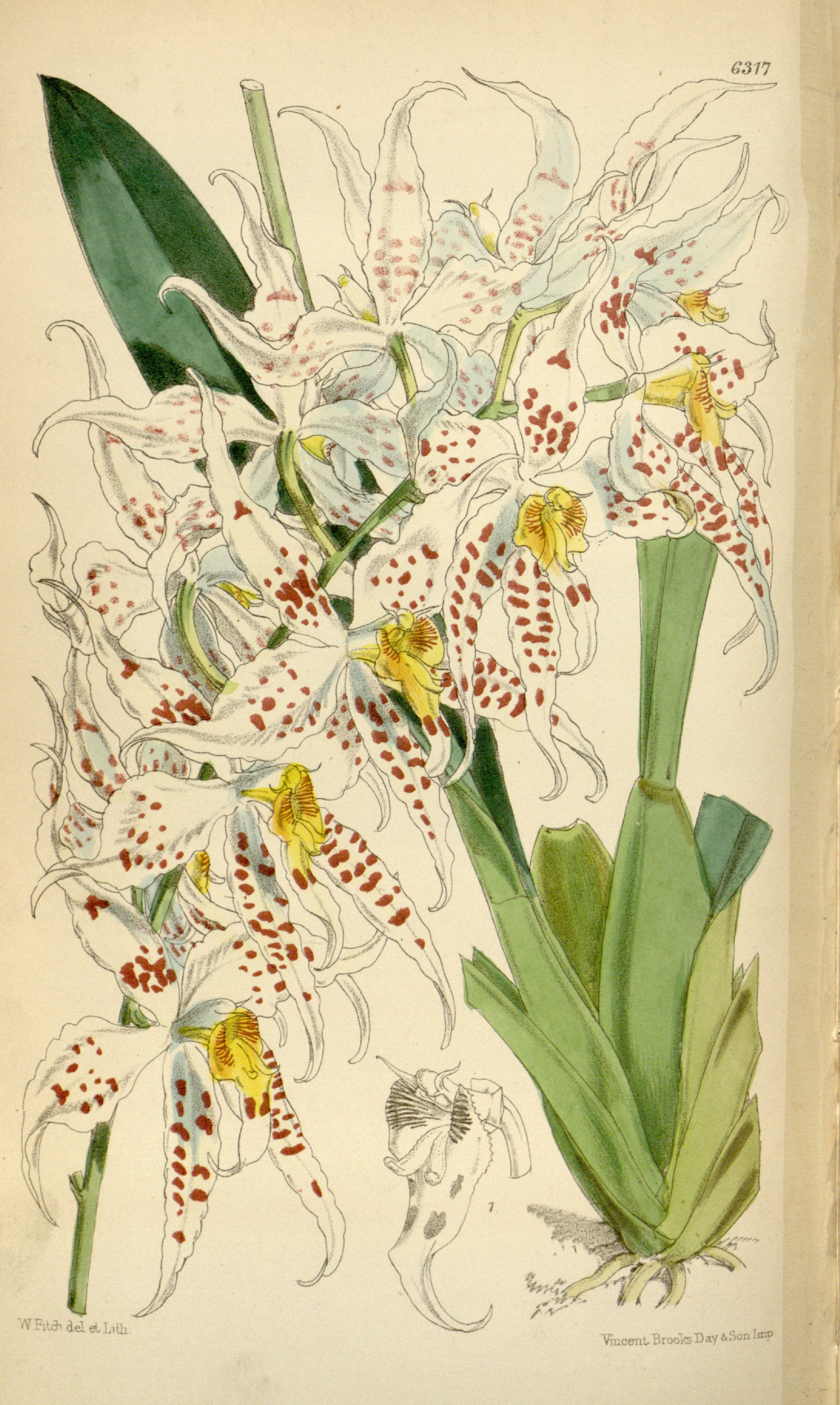

Scientific classification
- Kingdom: Plantae
- Clade: Tracheophytes
- Clade: Angiosperms
- Clade: Monocots
- Order: Asparagales
- Family: Orchidaceae
- Subfamily: Epidendroideae
- Genus: Oncidium
- Species: O. cirrhosum

Binomial name
- Oncidium cirrhosum (Lindl.) Beer

Synonyms
- Odontoglossum cirrhosum Lindl.

= Oncidium cirrhosum =

Species of orchid

Oncidium cirrhosum, synonym Odontoglossum cirrhosum, is a species of orchid native from Colombia to Ecuador. It is known as the wavy odontoglossum.
