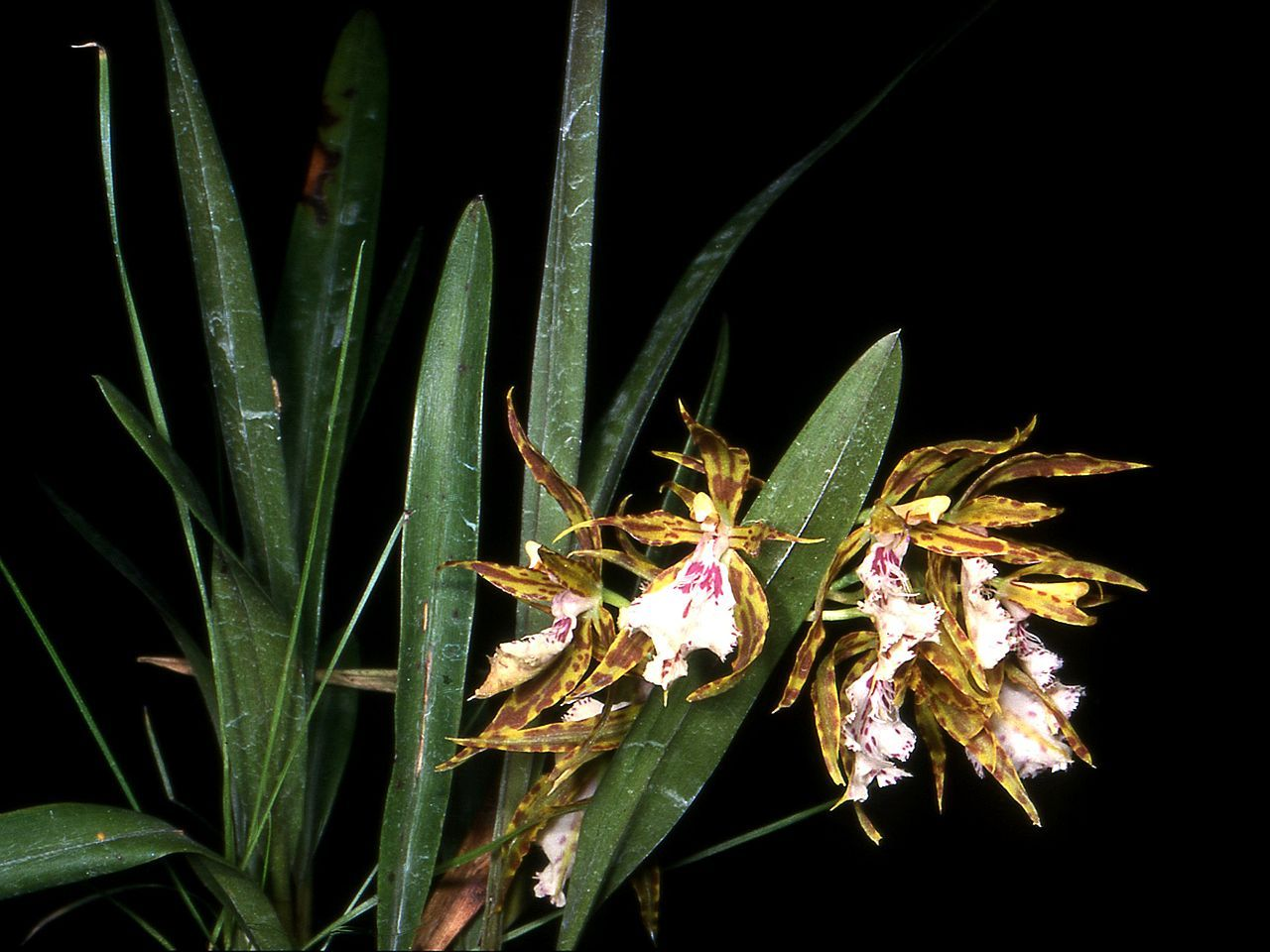

Scientific classification
- Kingdom: Plantae
- Clade: Tracheophytes
- Clade: Angiosperms
- Clade: Monocots
- Order: Asparagales
- Family: Orchidaceae
- Subfamily: Epidendroideae
- Genus: Oncidium
- Species: O. tenuoides

Binomial name
- Oncidium tenuoides M.W.Chase & N.H.Williams

Synonyms
- Odontoglossum sapphiratum Rchb.f. ex Bockemühl; Odontoglossum tenue Cogn.

= Oncidium tenuoides =

Species of orchid

Oncidium tenuoides is a species of flowering plant in the family Orchidaceae, native to Ecuador and Peru. It was first described by Célestin Alfred Cogniaux in 1895 as Odontoglossum tenue. When it was transferred to the genus Oncidium in 2008, the epithet tenue could not be used because it had already been published for a different species, so the replacement name O. tenuoides was adopted.
