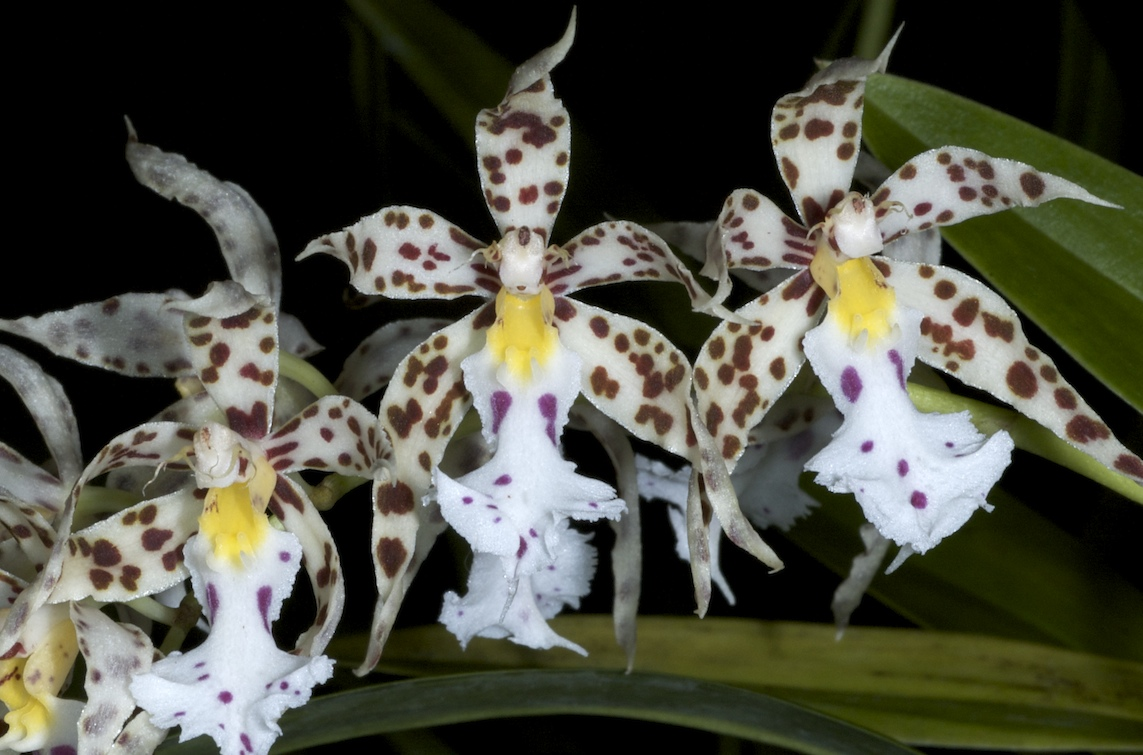

Scientific classification
- Kingdom: Plantae
- Clade: Tracheophytes
- Clade: Angiosperms
- Clade: Monocots
- Order: Asparagales
- Family: Orchidaceae
- Subfamily: Epidendroideae
- Genus: Oncidium
- Species: O. blandum

Binomial name
- Oncidium blandum (Rchb.f.) M.W.Chase & N.H.Williams

Synonyms
- Odontoglossum blandum Rchb.f.

= Oncidium blandum =

Species of orchid

Oncidium blandum, synonym Odontoglossum blandum, is a species of orchid native to Colombia, Ecuador, Peru and Venezuela. It is known as the charming odontoglossum.
