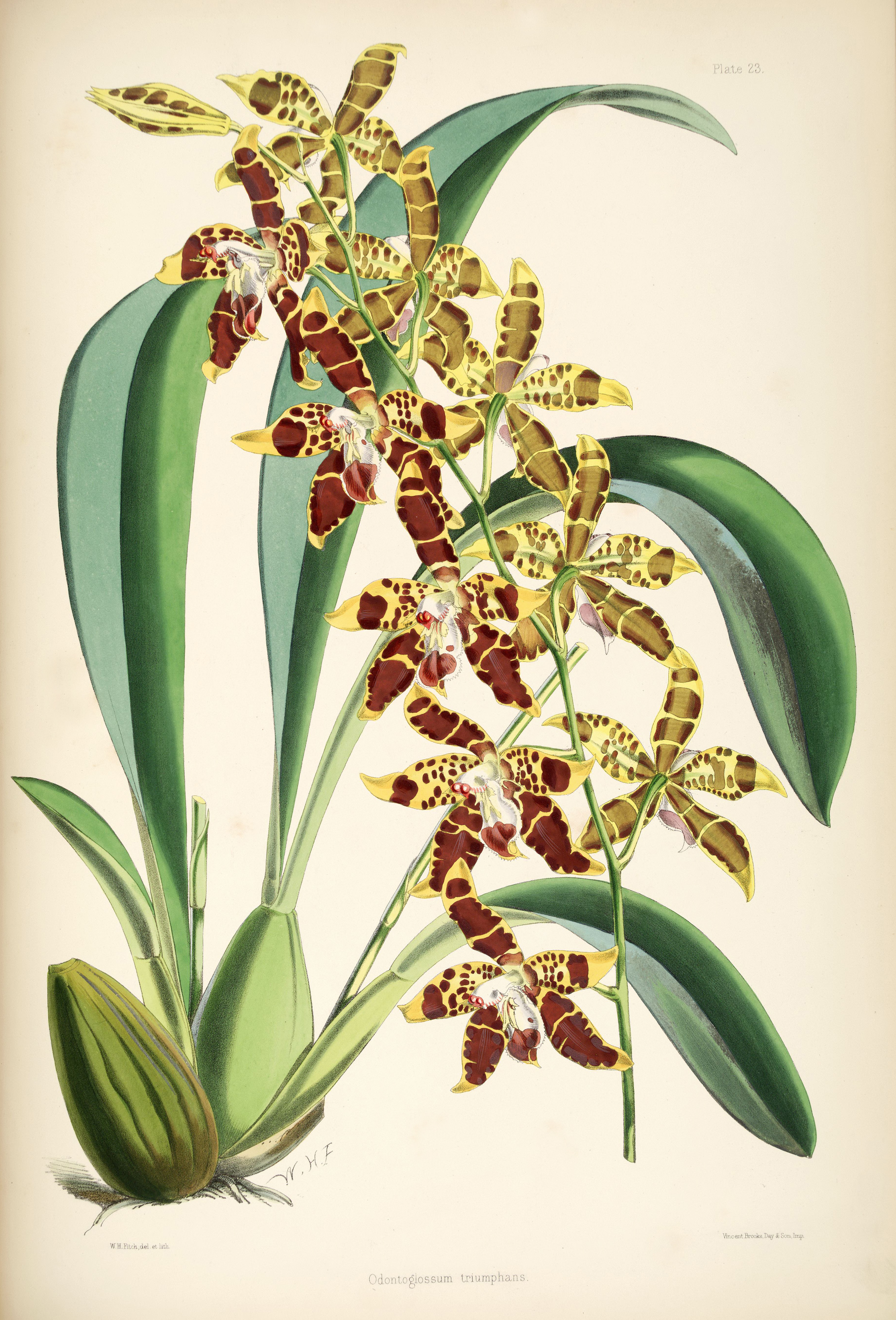

Scientific classification
- Kingdom: Plantae
- Clade: Tracheophytes
- Clade: Angiosperms
- Clade: Monocots
- Order: Asparagales
- Family: Orchidaceae
- Subfamily: Epidendroideae
- Genus: Oncidium
- Species: O. spectatissimum

Binomial name
- Oncidium spectatissimum (Lindl.) M.W.Chase & N.H.Williams

Synonyms
- Odontoglossum spectatissimum Lindl.; Odontoglossum spectatissimum var. cinctum (Rchb.f.) Bockemühl; Odontoglossum triumphans Rchb.f. & Warsz.; Odontoglossum triumphans var. aureum B.S.Williams; Odontoglossum triumphans var. cinctum Rchb.f.; Oncidium spectatissimum var. cinctum (Rchb.f.) J.M.H.Shaw

= Oncidium spectatissimum =

Species of orchid

Oncidium spectatissimum is a species of flowering plant in the family Orchidaceae, native to Colombia, Ecuador, and Venezuela. It was first described by John Lindley in 1852 as Odontoglossum spectatissimum.
