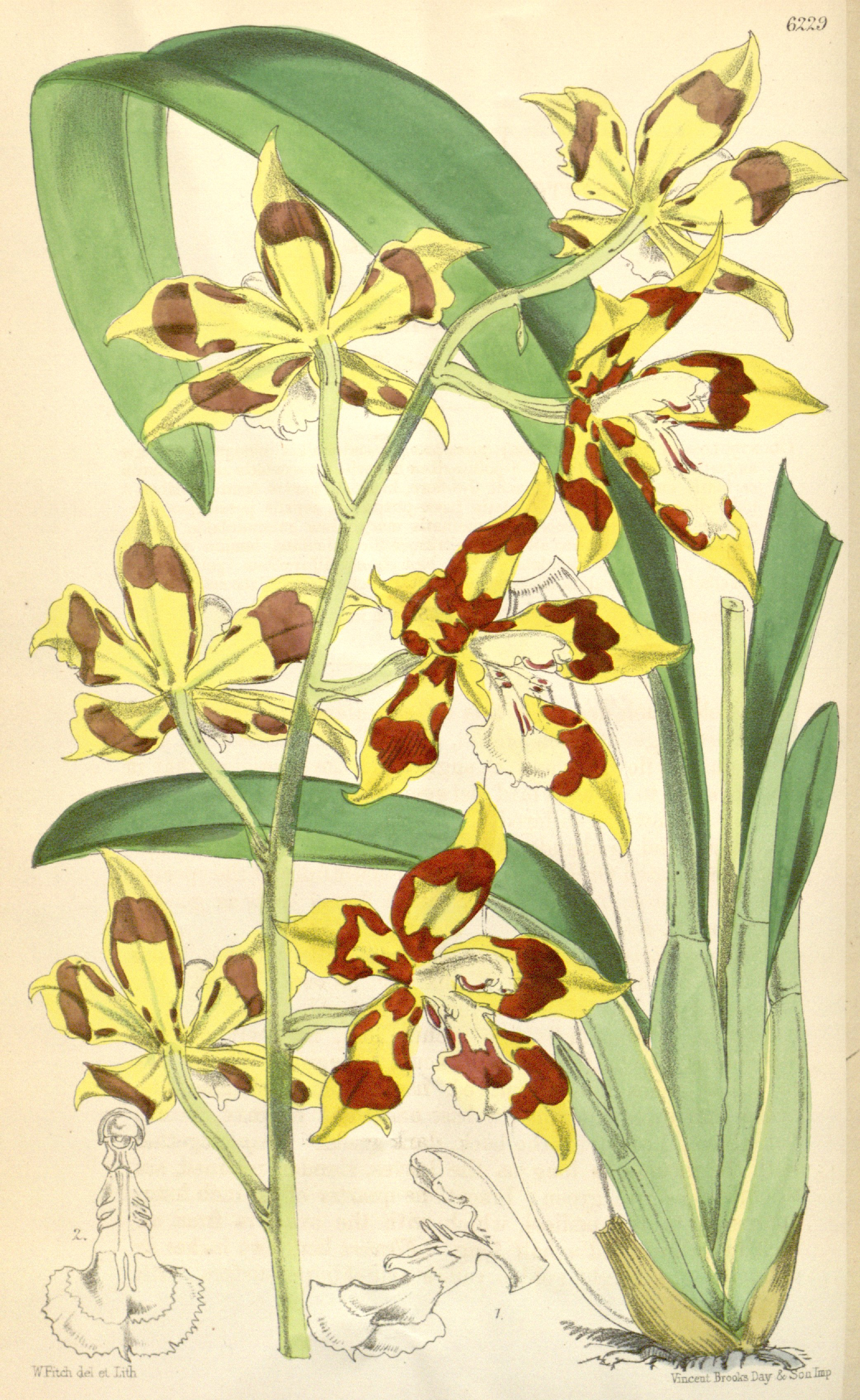

Scientific classification
- Kingdom: Plantae
- Clade: Tracheophytes
- Clade: Angiosperms
- Clade: Monocots
- Order: Asparagales
- Family: Orchidaceae
- Subfamily: Epidendroideae
- Genus: Oncidium
- Species: O. praenitens

Binomial name
- Oncidium praenitens (Rchb.f.) M.W.Chase & N.H.Williams

Synonyms
- Odontoglossum praenitens Rchb.f.

= Oncidium praenitens =

Species of orchid

Oncidium praenitens is a species of flowering plant in the family Orchidaceae, endemic to Colombia in tropical biomes. It is a cool to cold growing pseudobulbeous epiphyte that blooms in the spring and summer with yellow flowers thay have reddish-brown spots. It was first described by Heinrich Gustav Reichenbach in 1875 as Odontoglossum praenitens.
