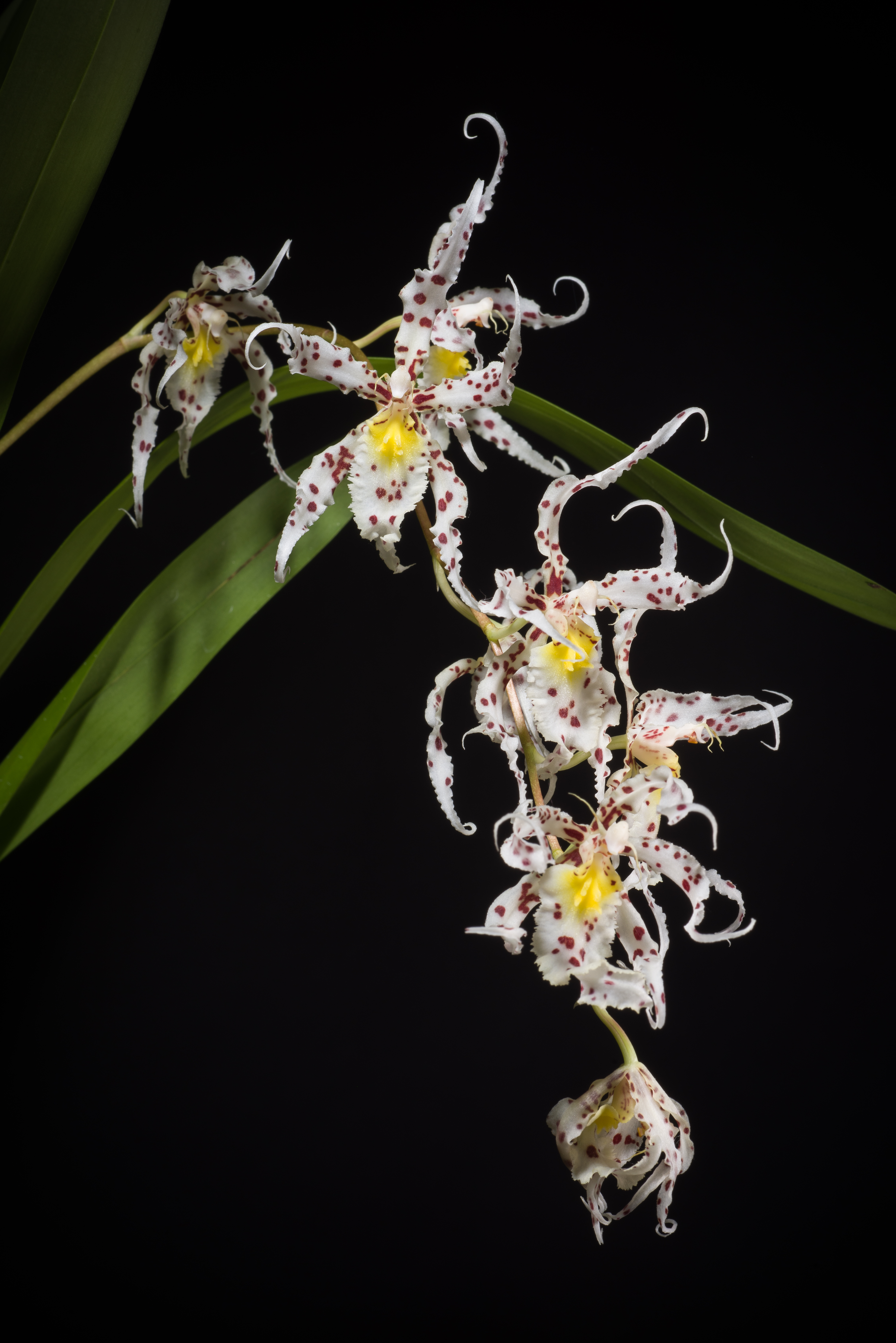

Scientific classification
- Kingdom: Plantae
- Clade: Tracheophytes
- Clade: Angiosperms
- Clade: Monocots
- Order: Asparagales
- Family: Orchidaceae
- Subfamily: Epidendroideae
- Genus: Oncidium
- Species: O. naevium

Binomial name
- Oncidium naevium (Lindl.) Beer

Synonyms
- Odontoglossum naevium Lindl.; Odontoglossum naevium var. majus Lindl.

= Oncidium naevium =

Species of orchid

Oncidium naevium, the spotted oncidium, is an epiphyte that can be found in Colombia and Guyana.

The species is endangered due to habitat destruction
