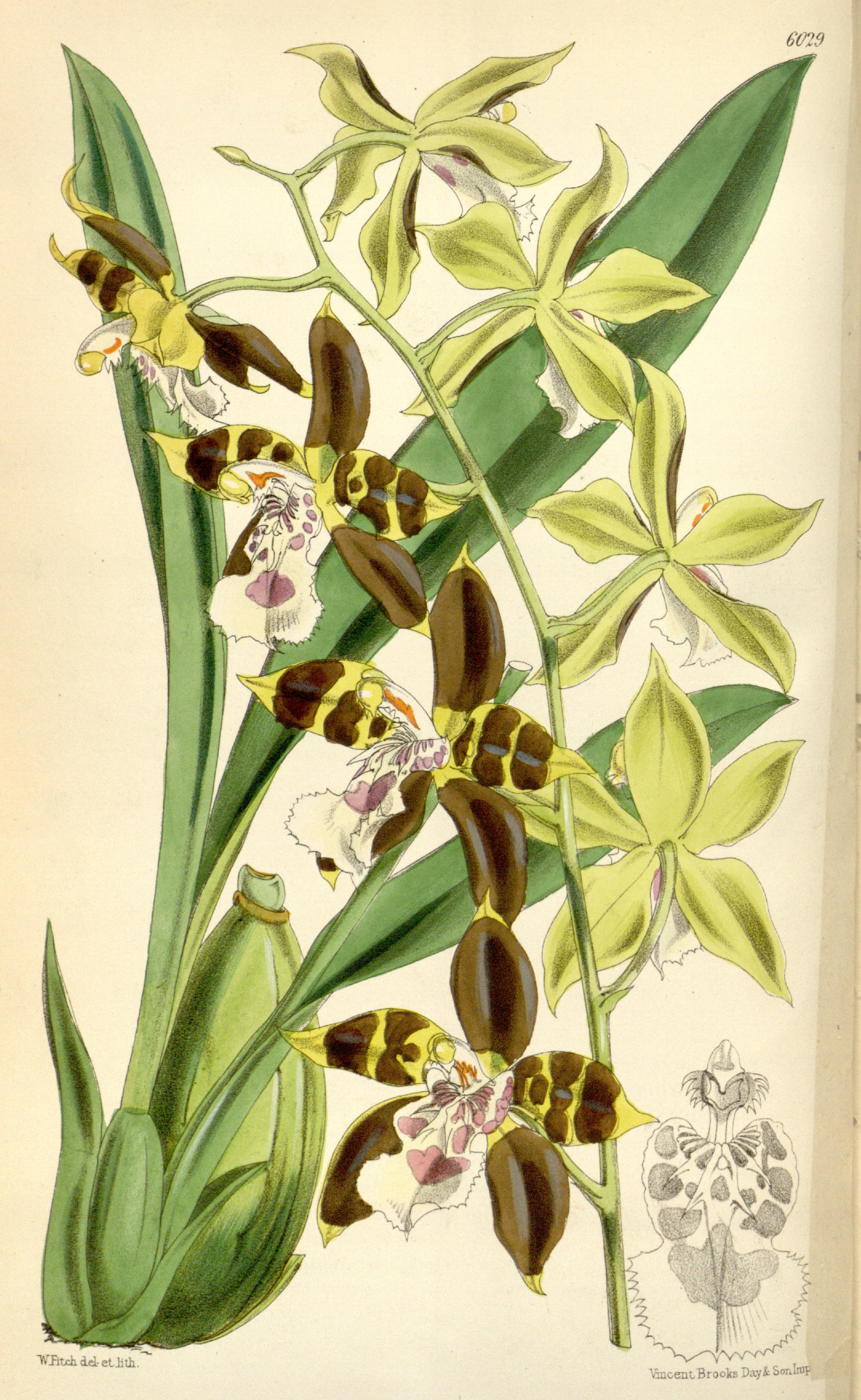

Scientific classification
- Kingdom: Plantae
- Clade: Tracheophytes
- Clade: Angiosperms
- Clade: Monocots
- Order: Asparagales
- Family: Orchidaceae
- Subfamily: Epidendroideae
- Genus: Oncidium
- Species: O. tripudians

Binomial name
- Oncidium tripudians (Rchb.f. & Warsz.) M.W.Chase & N.H.Williams

Synonyms
- Odontoglossum tripudians Rchb.f. & Warsz.; Odontoglossum tripudians var. oculatum Rchb.f.; Odontoglossum tripudians var. xanthoglossum Rchb.f.

= Oncidium tripudians =

Species of orchid

Oncidium tripudians is a species of flowering plant in the family Orchidaceae, endemic to Colombia. It was first described in 1852 as Odontoglossum spectatissimum.
