= Oncidium harryanum =

Scientific classification
- Kingdom: Plantae
- Clade: Embryophytes
- Clade: Tracheophytes
- Clade: Angiosperms
- Clade: Monocots
- Order: Asparagales
- Family: Orchidaceae
- Subfamily: Epidendroideae
- Tribe: Cymbidieae
- Subtribe: Oncidiinae
- Genus: Oncidium
- Species: O. harryanum

Binomial name
- Oncidium harryanum (Rchb.f.) M.W.Chase & N.H.Williams

Synonyms
- Odontoglossum harryanum Rchb.f.

Species of plant

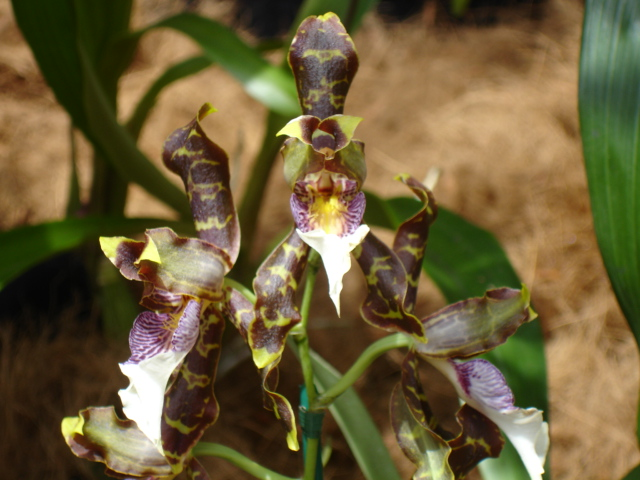
Odontoglossum harryanum. Orquidea cultivada: Club Hato grande (Bogota).

Oncidium harryanum is a species of orchid native to Colombia, Ecuador, and Peru. It is named in honour of Sir Harry Veitch (1840–1924), a horticulturist who sent collectors out for the firm of James Veitch & Sons.
