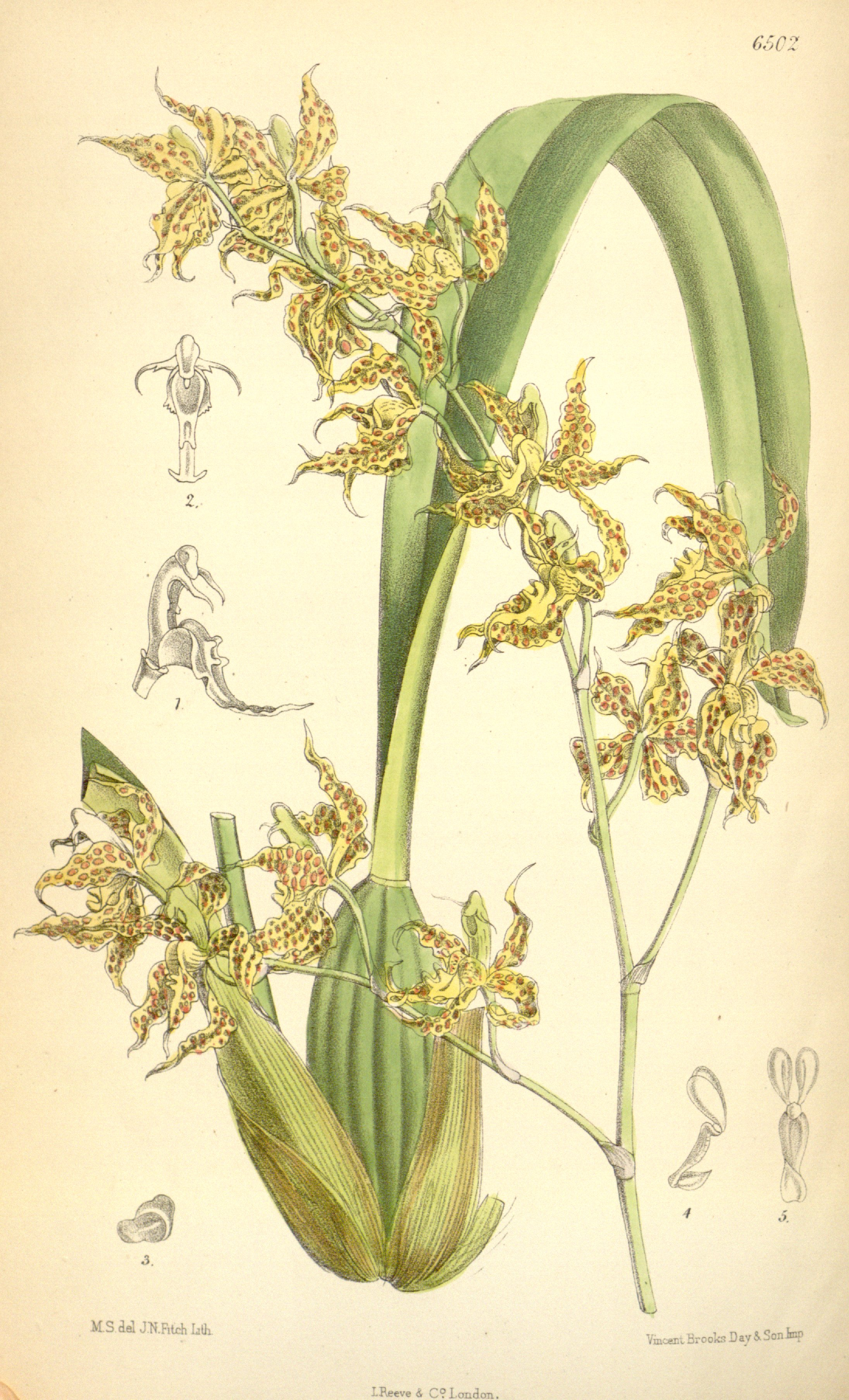

Scientific classification
- Kingdom: Plantae
- Clade: Tracheophytes
- Clade: Angiosperms
- Clade: Monocots
- Order: Asparagales
- Family: Orchidaceae
- Subfamily: Epidendroideae
- Genus: Oncidium
- Species: O. odoratum

Binomial name
- Oncidium odoratum (Lindl.) Beer

Synonyms
- Odontoglossum odoratum Lindl.; Odontoglossum odoratum var. latimaculatum André; Odontoglossum glonerianum Linden

= Oncidium odoratum =

Species of orchid

Oncidium odoratum is a species of flowering plant in the family Orchidaceae, native to Colombia and Venezuela . It was first described by John Lindley in 1846 as Odontoglossum odoratum. It is known as the fragrant odontoglossum.
