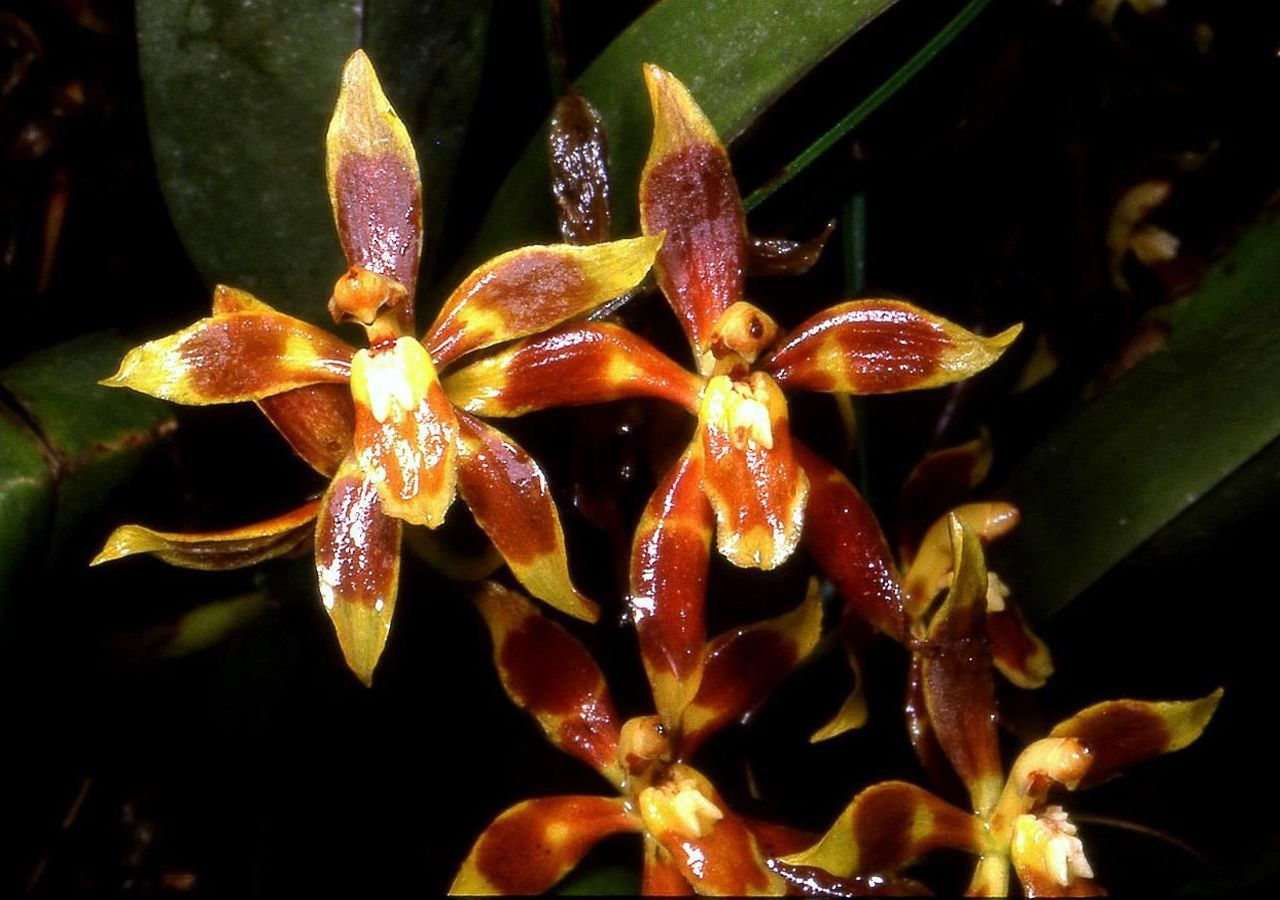

Scientific classification
- Kingdom: Plantae
- Clade: Tracheophytes
- Clade: Angiosperms
- Clade: Monocots
- Order: Asparagales
- Family: Orchidaceae
- Subfamily: Epidendroideae
- Genus: Oncidium
- Species: O. cruentoides

Binomial name
- Oncidium cruentoides M.W.Chase & N.H.Williams

Synonyms
- Odontoglossum cruentum Rchb.f.; Odontoglossum hrubyanum Rchb.f.; Oncidium hrubyatoides M.W.Chase & N.H.Williams

= Oncidium cruentoides =

Species of orchid

Oncidium cruentoides is a species of flowering plant in the family Orchidaceae, native to Ecuador and Peru. It was first described by Heinrich Gustav Reichenbach in 1873 as Odontoglossum cruentum. When transferred to Oncidium in 2008, the epithet cruentum could not be used because it had already been published for a different species, so the replacement name O. cruentoides was used.
