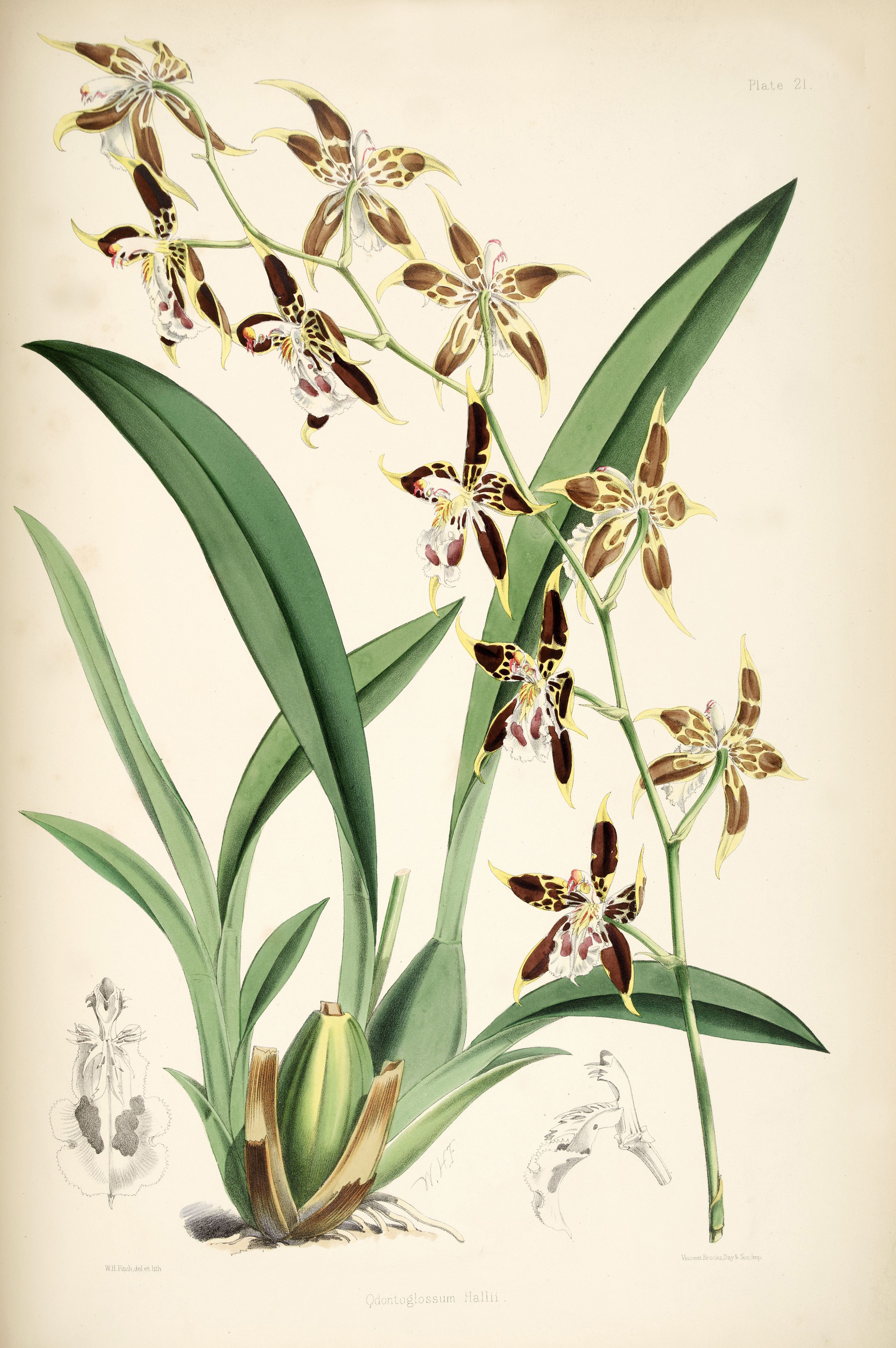

Scientific classification
- Kingdom: Plantae
- Clade: Tracheophytes
- Clade: Angiosperms
- Clade: Monocots
- Order: Asparagales
- Family: Orchidaceae
- Subfamily: Epidendroideae
- Genus: Oncidium
- Species: O. hallii

Binomial name
- Oncidium hallii (Lindl.) Beer

Synonyms
- Odontoglossum hallii Lindl.; Odontoglossum hallii var. leucoglossum Rchb.f.; Odontoglossum hallii var. xanthoglossum Rchb.f.; Odontoglossum victor Rchb.f.; Oncidium victor (Rchb.f.) J.M.H.Shaw

= Oncidium hallii =

Species of plant

Oncidium hallii, synonyms including Odontoglossum hallii, is a species of orchid native to Colombia and Ecuador. It is known as Hall's odontoglossum.
