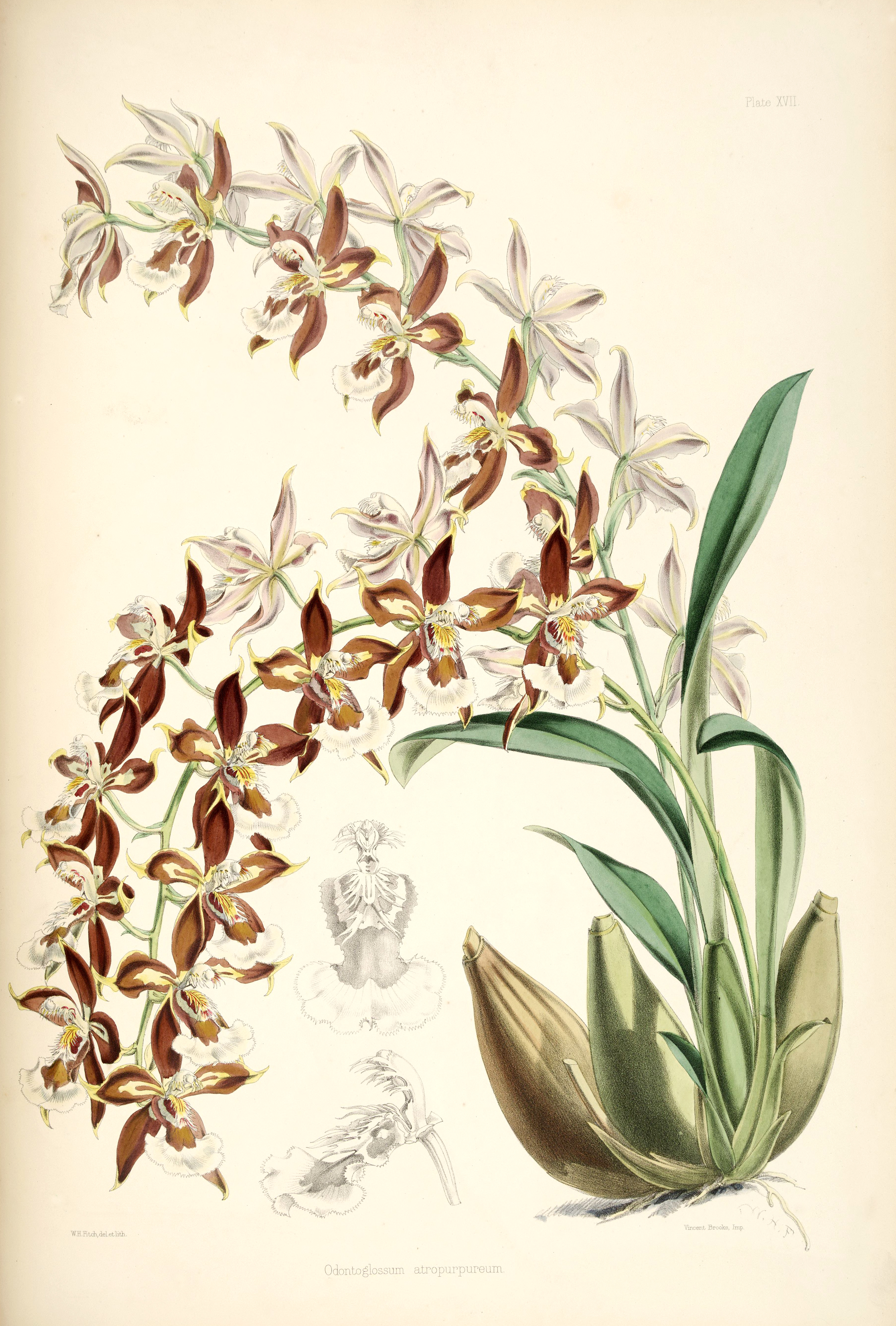

Scientific classification
- Kingdom: Plantae
- Clade: Tracheophytes
- Clade: Angiosperms
- Clade: Monocots
- Order: Asparagales
- Family: Orchidaceae
- Subfamily: Epidendroideae
- Genus: Oncidium
- Species: O. luteopurpureum

Binomial name
- Oncidium luteopurpureum (Lindl.) Beer

Synonyms
- Odontoglossum hystrix Bateman; Odontoglossum luteopurpureum Lindl.; Odontoglossum radiatum Rchb.f.

= Oncidium luteopurpureum =

Species of orchid

Oncidium luteopurpureum, synonym Odontoglossum luteopurpureum, is a species of orchid endemic to Colombia.
