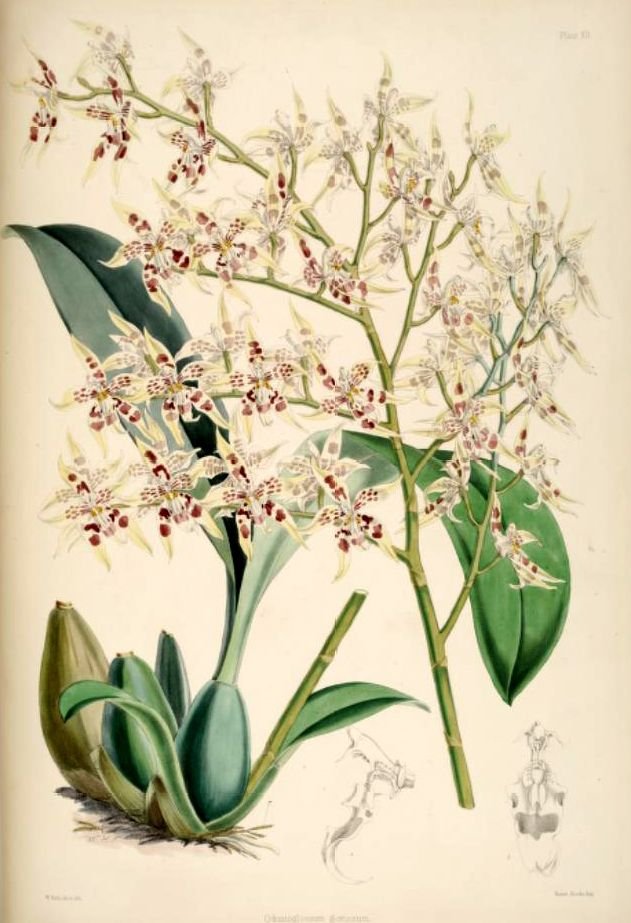

Scientific classification
- Kingdom: Plantae
- Clade: Tracheophytes
- Clade: Angiosperms
- Clade: Monocots
- Order: Asparagales
- Family: Orchidaceae
- Subfamily: Epidendroideae
- Genus: Oncidium
- Species: O. gloriosum

Binomial name
- Oncidium gloriosum (Linden & Rchb.f.) M.W.Chase & N.H.Williams

Synonyms
- Odontoglossum gloriosum Linden & Rchb.f.; Odontoglossum gloriosum f. flaviflorum (Bockemühl) O.Gruss & M.Wolff; Odontoglossum gloriosum var. flaviflorum Bockemühl; Oncidium gloriosum var. flaviflorum (Bockemühl) M.W.Chase & N.H.Williams

= Oncidium gloriosum =

Species of orchid

Oncidium gloriosum, synonym Odontoglossum gloriosum, is a species of flowering plant in the family Orchidaceae. This orchid is native to Colombia and Venezuela. It is known as the glorious odontoglossum.
