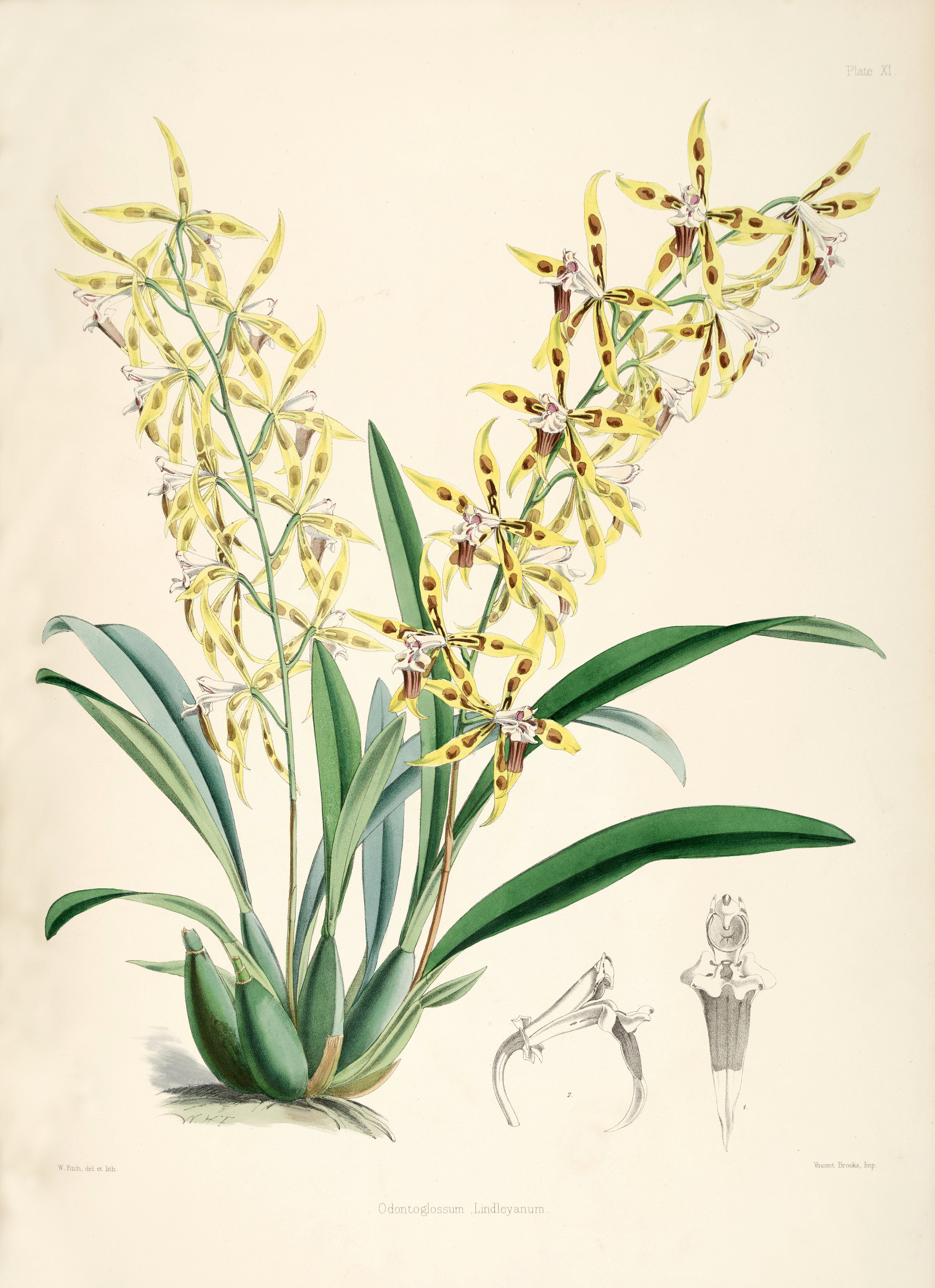

Scientific classification
- Kingdom: Plantae
- Clade: Tracheophytes
- Clade: Angiosperms
- Clade: Monocots
- Order: Asparagales
- Family: Orchidaceae
- Subfamily: Epidendroideae
- Genus: Oncidium
- Species: O. lindleyoides

Binomial name
- Oncidium lindleyoides M.W.Chase & N.H.Williams

Synonyms
- Odontoglossum epidendroides Lindl., nom. illeg.; Odontoglossum lindleyanum Rchb.f. & Warsz.; Odontoglossum lindleyanum var. parviflorum Bockemühl; Oncidium lindleyoides var. parviflorum (Bockemühl) J.M.H.Shaw

= Oncidium lindleyoides =

Species of orchid

Oncidium lindleyoides is a species of flowering plant in the family Orchidaceae, native to Colombia, Ecuador and Venezuela. It was first described by Heinrich Gustav Reichenbach in 1854 as Odontoglossum lindleyanum. When transferred to Oncidium in 2008, the epithet lindleyanum could not be used because it had already been published for a different species, so the replacement name O. lindleyoides was used.
