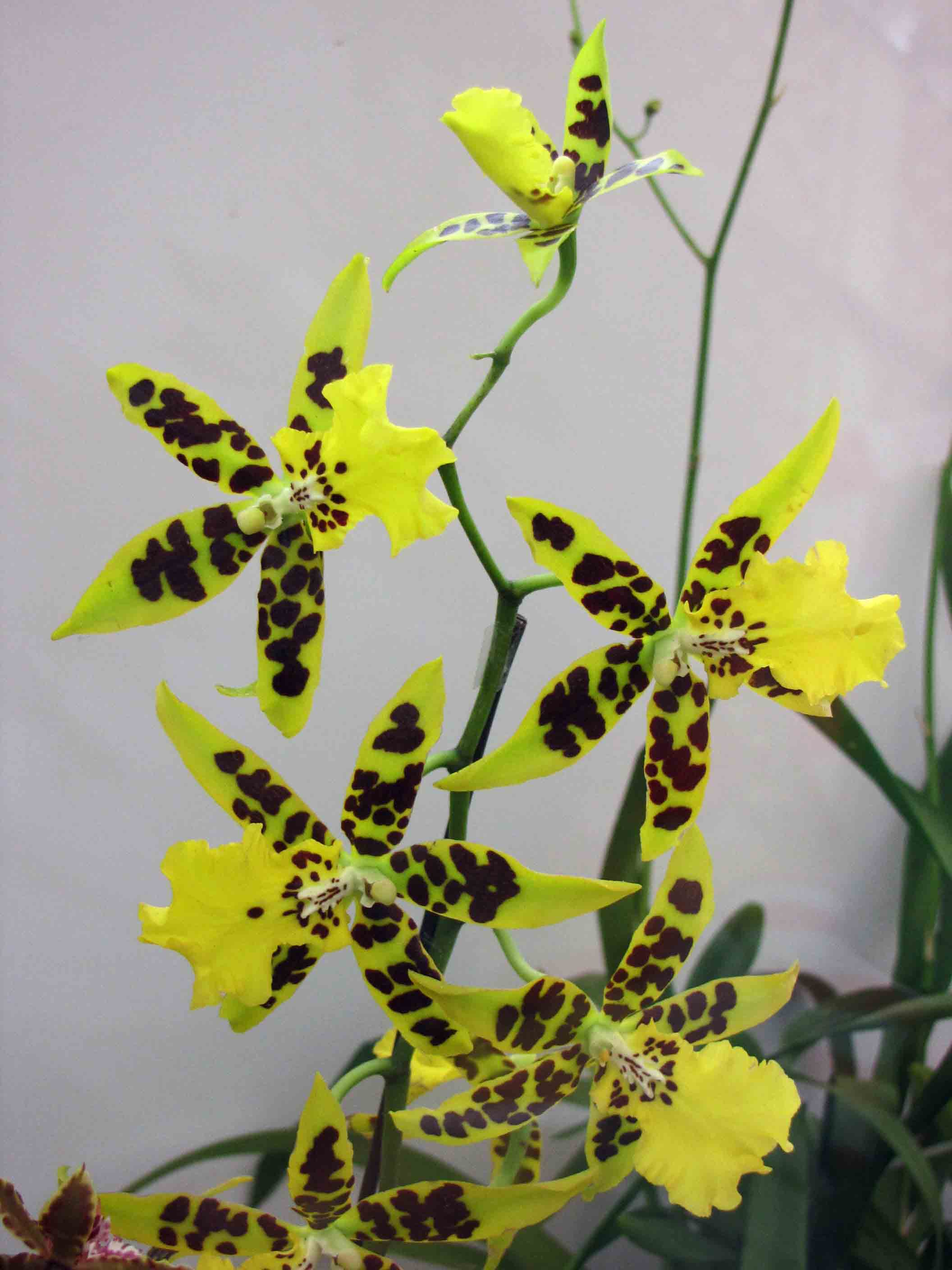

Scientific classification
- Kingdom: Plantae
- Clade: Tracheophytes
- Clade: Angiosperms
- Clade: Monocots
- Order: Asparagales
- Family: Orchidaceae
- Subfamily: Epidendroideae
- Tribe: Cymbidieae
- Subtribe: Oncidiinae
- Genus: × Brassidium hort.

= × Brassidium =

Genus of flowering plants

× Brassidium, abbreviated in trade journals Brsdm, is an artificial intergeneric hybrid between the orchid genera Brassia and Oncidium (Brs x Onc). When Cochlioda and Odontoglossum are sunk into Oncidium, × Maclellanara (Mclna.), × Odontobrassia (Odbrs.) and × Sanderara (Sand.) are synonyms.

== Taxonomy ==
The nothogenus name × Brassidium was first published in 1948 in the Orchid Review, for hybrids between Brassia and Oncidium. The first such hybrid was between Brassia brachiata (a synonym of Brassia verrucosa) and Oncidium anthocrene. It was named Brassidium Coronet, and was registered by O. Kirsch.

=== Synonymous nothogenera ===
As of December 2023, Plants of the World Online sank Cochlioda and Odontoglossum within Oncidium. Some other nothogenera then have the same parent genera as × Brassidium:

- × Maclellanara, originally Brassia × Odontoglossum × Oncidium, becomes Brassia × Oncidium.

For example, the grex name × Maclellanara Big Lake is a synonym of × Brassidium Big Lake, which is the triple hybrid Brassia verrucosa × (Oncidium hallii × Oncidium maculatum), where Oncidium hallii was previously treated as Odontoglossum hallii.

- × Odontobrassia, originally Brassia × Odontoglossum, becomes Brassia × Oncidium.

For example, the grex name × Odontobrassia Caricosa is a synonym of × Brassidium Caricosa, which is the hybrid Brassia verrucosa × Oncidium cariniferum, where Oncidium cariniferum was previously treated as Odontoglossum cariniferum.

- × Sanderara, originally Brassia × Cochlioda × Odontoglossum, becomes Brassia × Oncidium.

For example, the grex name × Sanderara Alpha is a synonym of × Brassidium Alpha. Its parents include Oncidium noezlianum and Oncidium nobile, previously treated as Cochlioda noezliana and Odontoglossum nobile respectively.

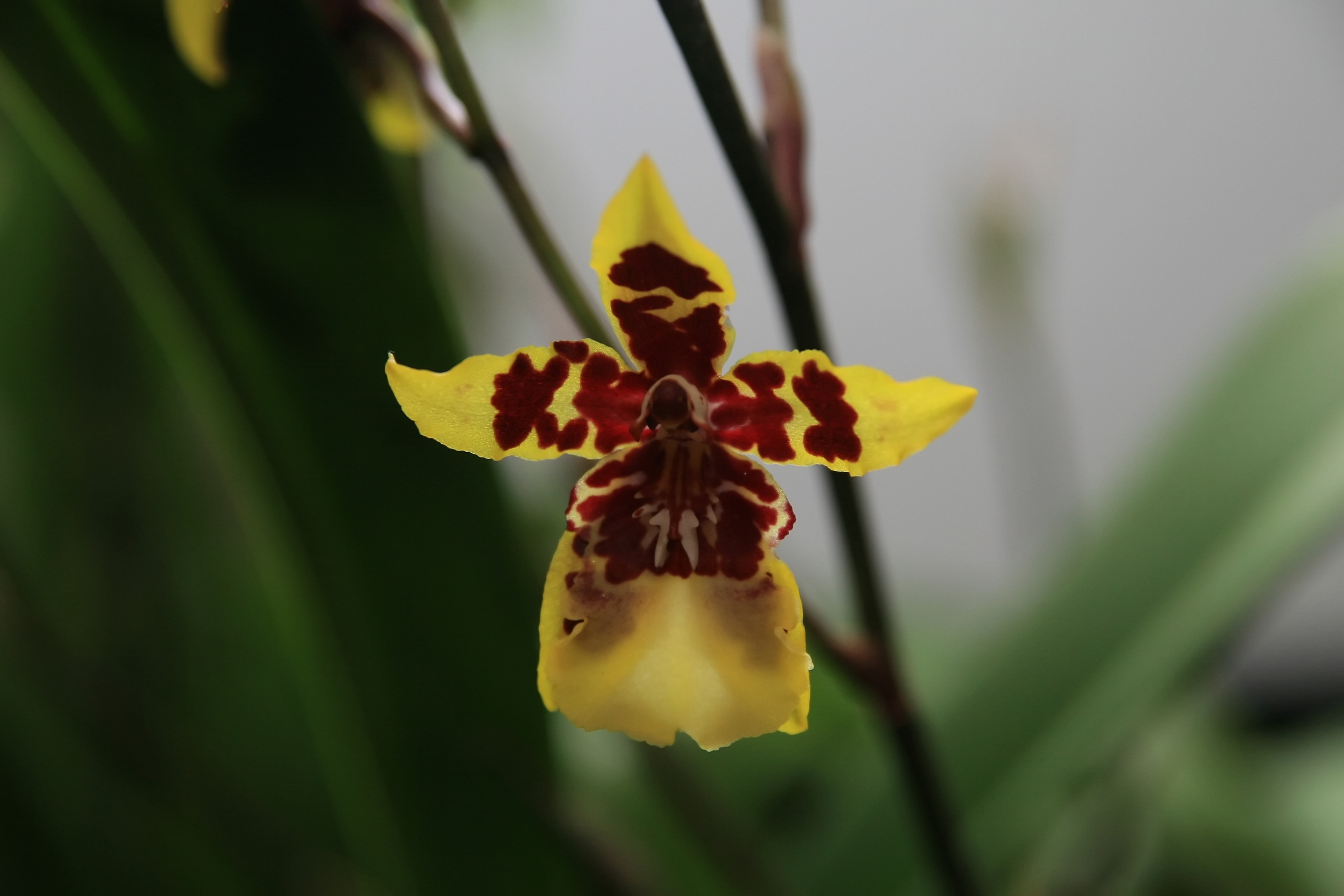
× Brassidium Black Star 'Pacific Red Star'

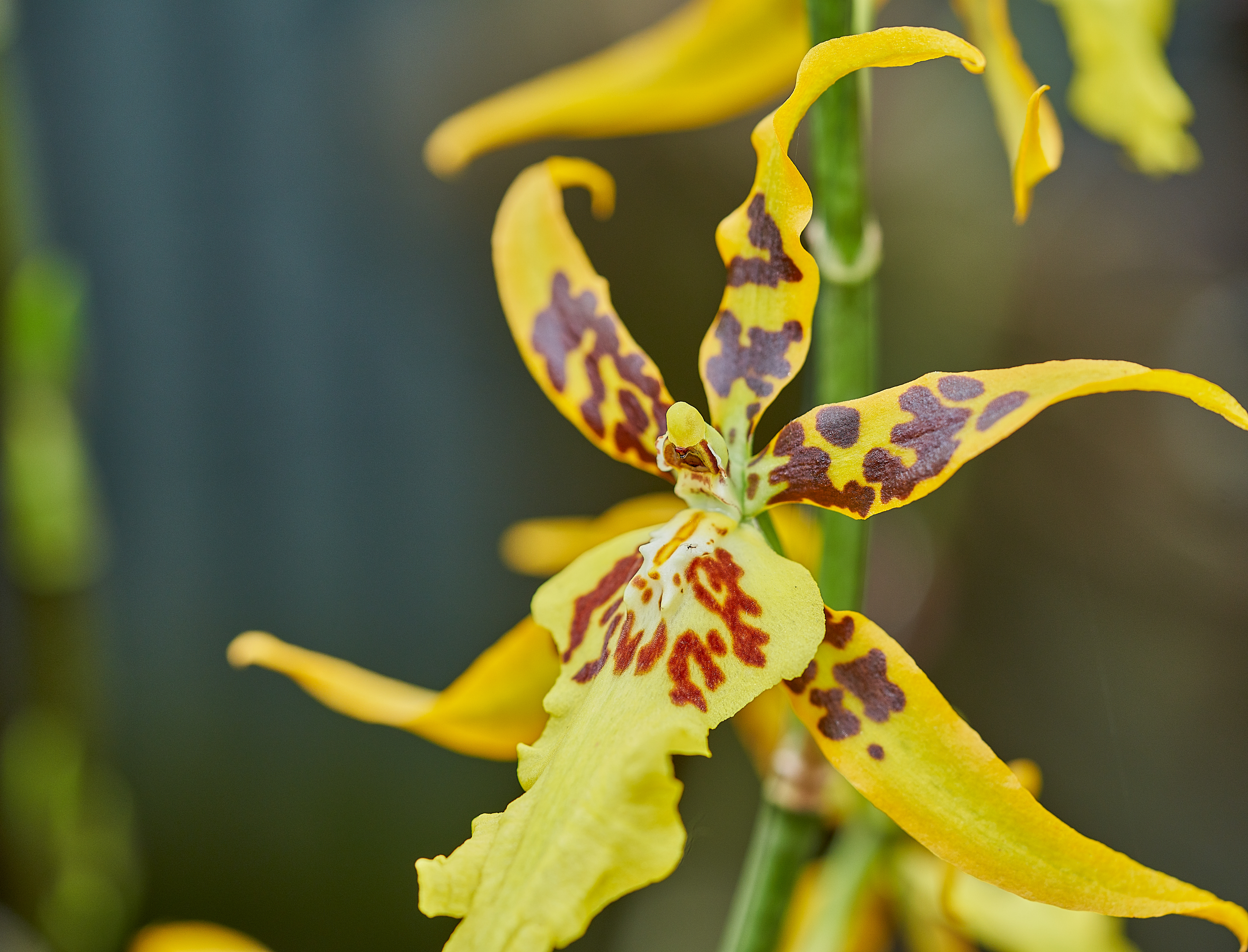
× Brassidium Fly Away 'Miami'

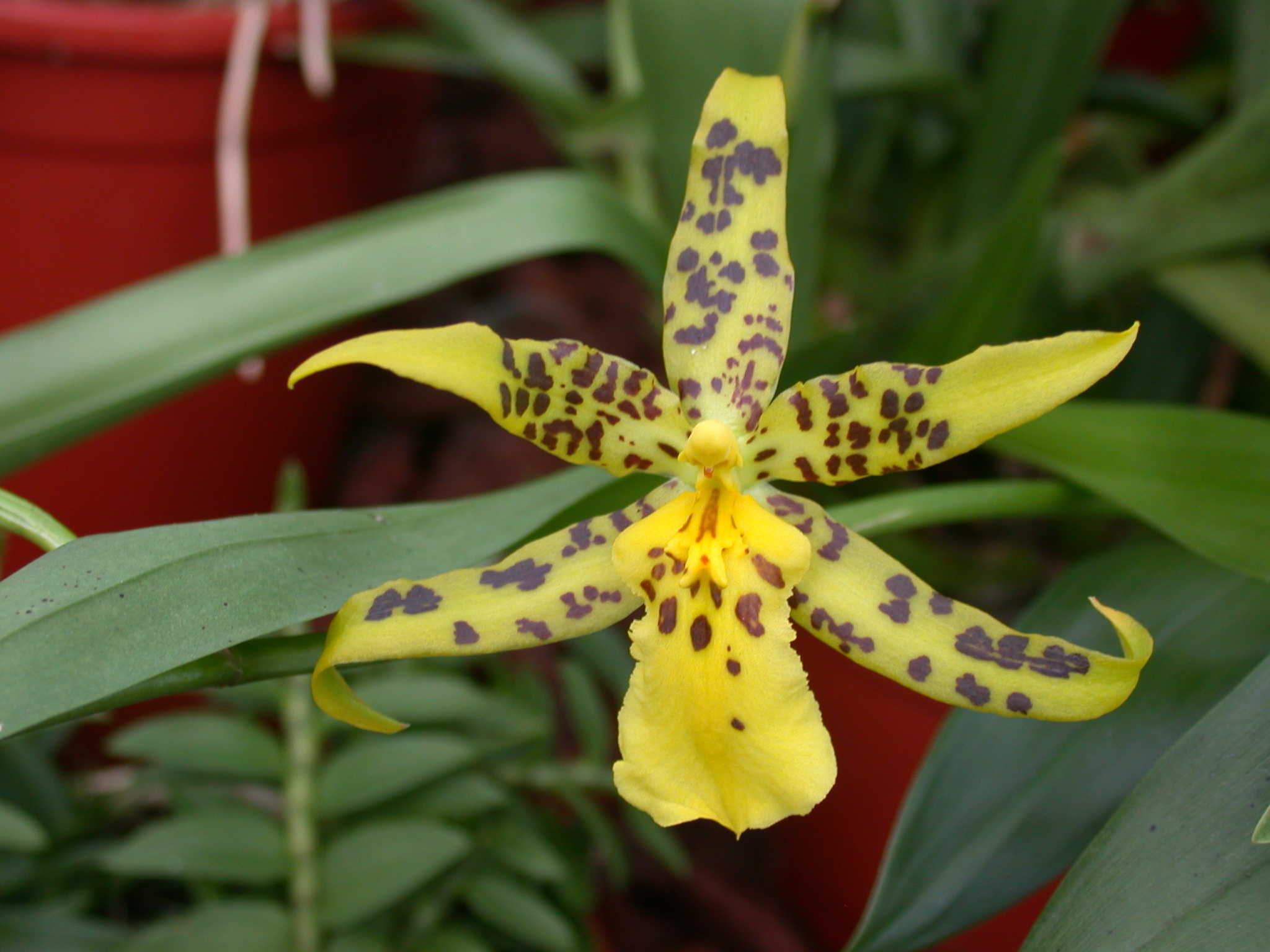
× Brassidium Pagan Lovesong 'Lorraine'

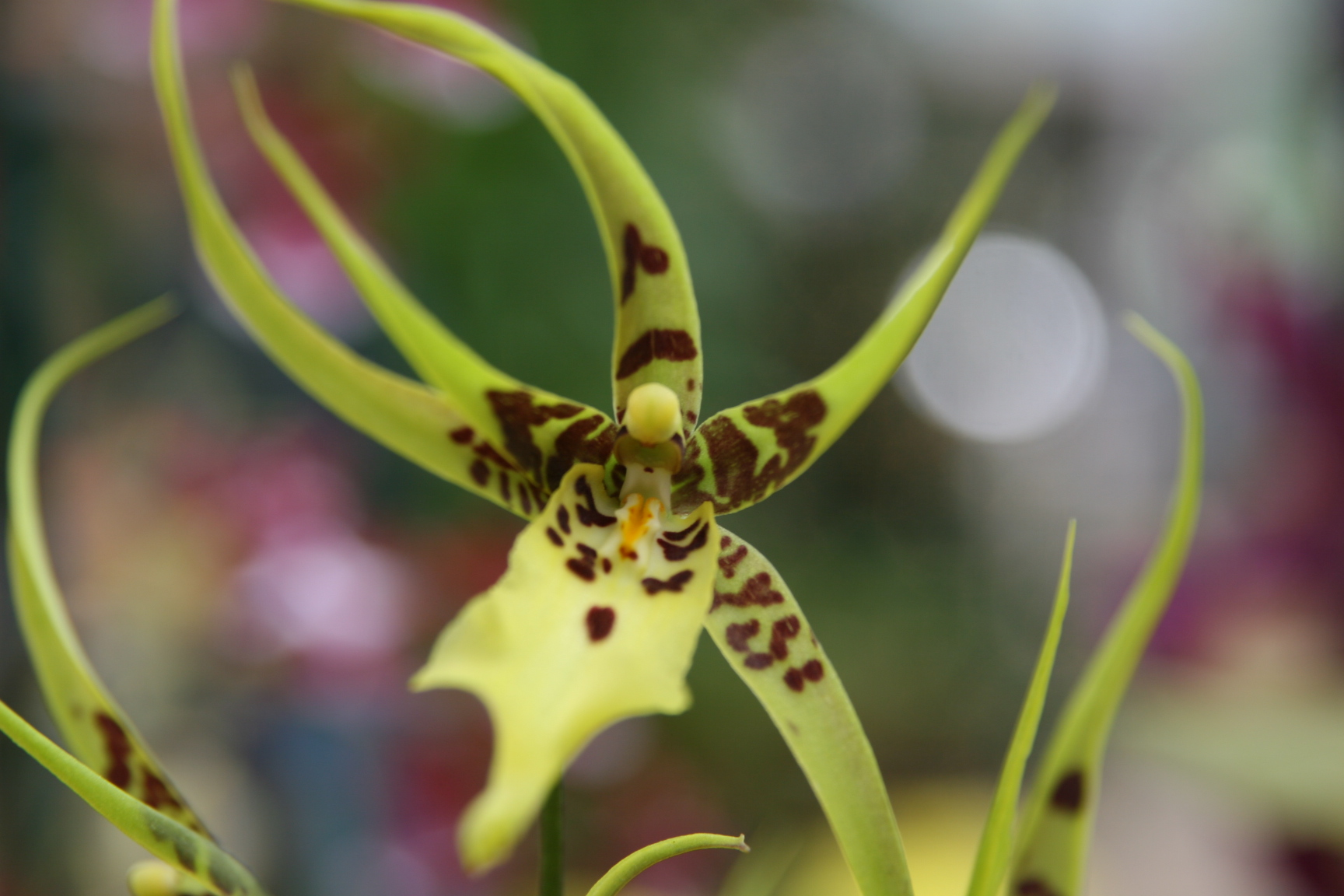
× Brassidium Shooting Star 'Black Gold'

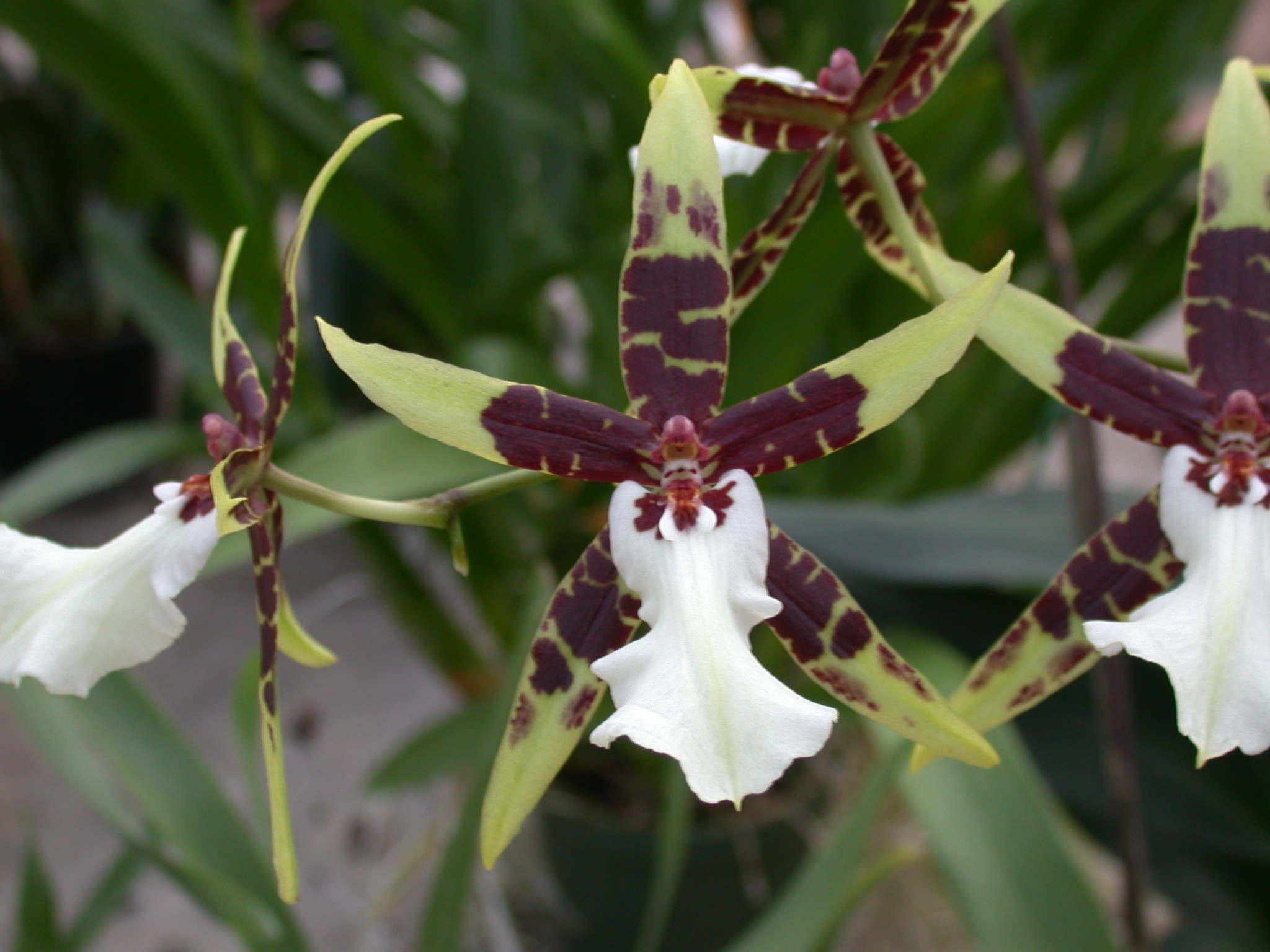
× Brassidium Wild Warrior 'Chieftain'
