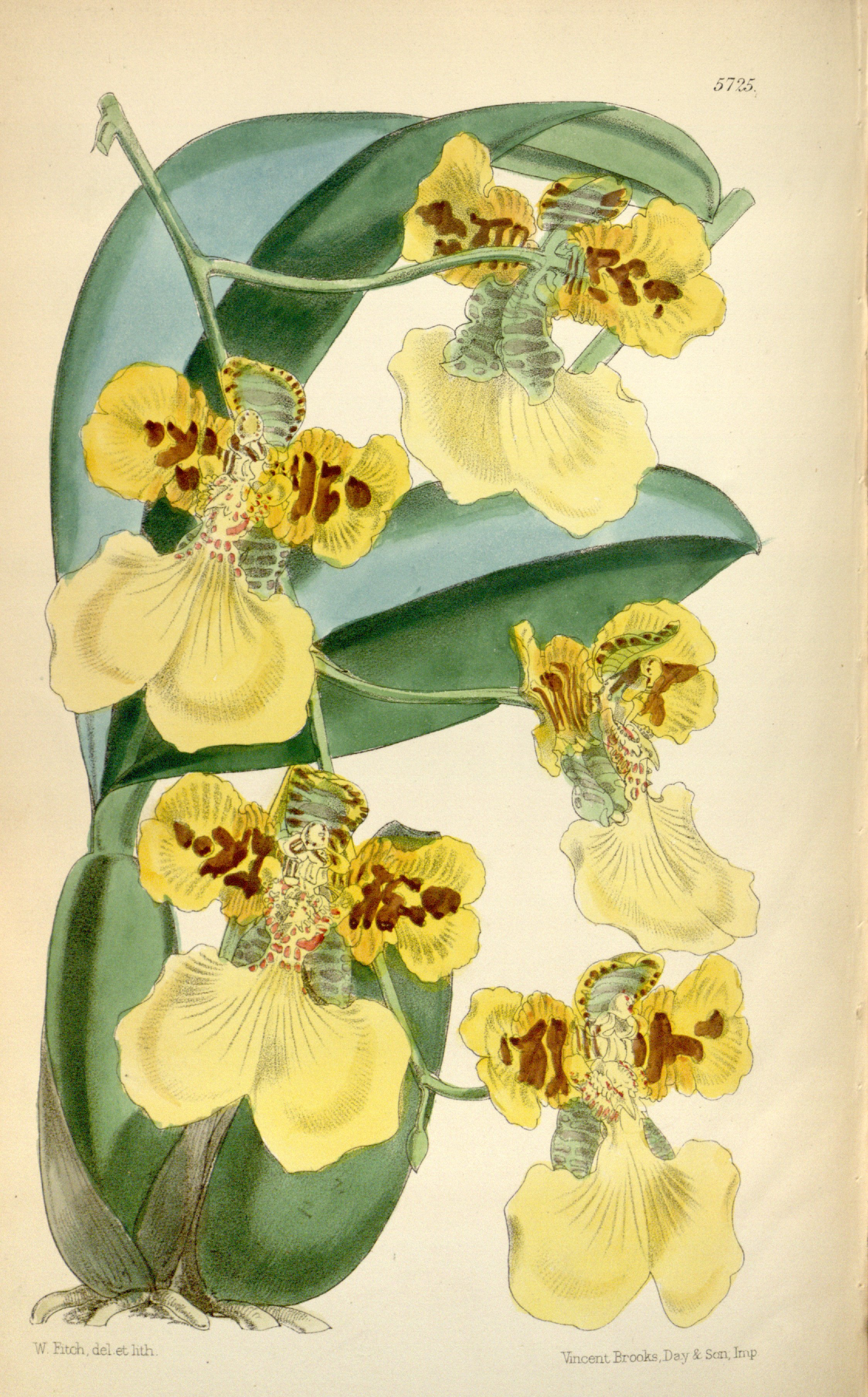

Scientific classification
- Kingdom: Plantae
- Clade: Tracheophytes
- Clade: Angiosperms
- Clade: Monocots
- Order: Asparagales
- Family: Orchidaceae
- Subfamily: Epidendroideae
- Genus: Oncidium
- Species: O. marshallianum

Binomial name
- Oncidium marshallianum Rchb.f.

Synonyms
- Brasilidium marshallianum (Rchb.f.) Campacci

= Oncidium marshallianum =

Species of orchid

Oncidium marshallianum is a species of orchid endemic to southeastern Brazil.
