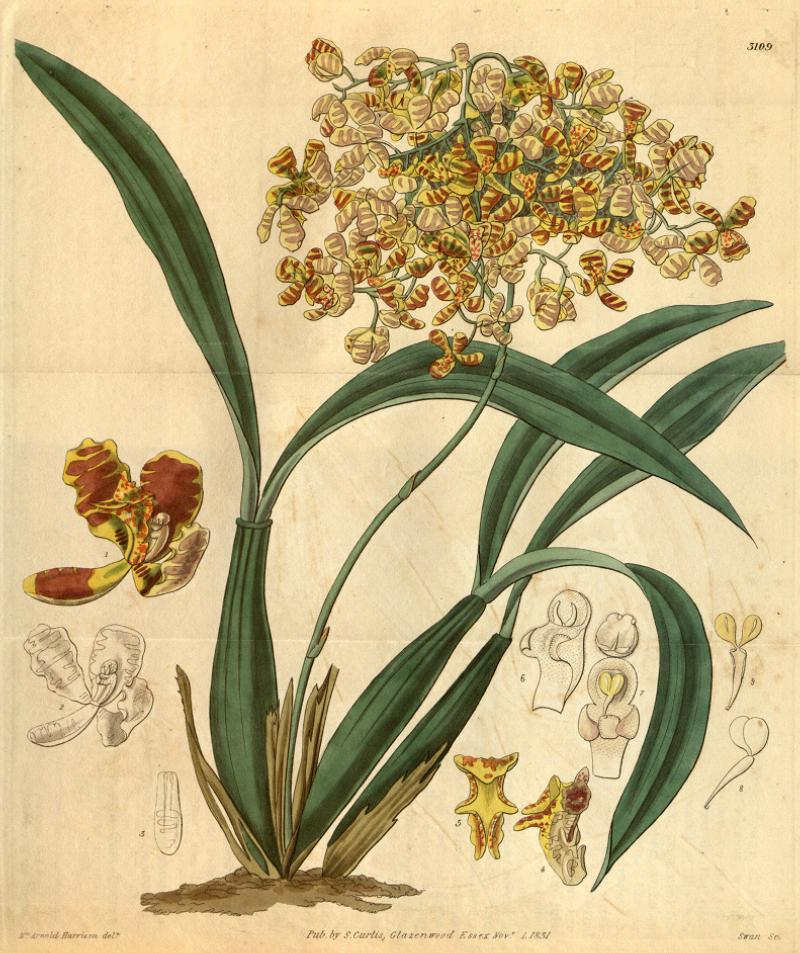

Scientific classification
- Kingdom: Plantae
- Clade: Tracheophytes
- Clade: Angiosperms
- Clade: Monocots
- Order: Asparagales
- Family: Orchidaceae
- Subfamily: Epidendroideae
- Genus: Oncidium
- Species: O. pubes

Binomial name
- Oncidium pubes Lindl.

Synonyms
- Oncidium puberum Spreng.; Oncidium bicornutum Hook.; Oncidium phantasmaticum Lem.; Baptistonia pubes (Lindl.) Chiron & V.P.Castro

= Oncidium pubes =

Species of orchid

Oncidium pubes is a species of orchid found from Colombia, southeastern and southern Brazil to northeastern Argentina.
