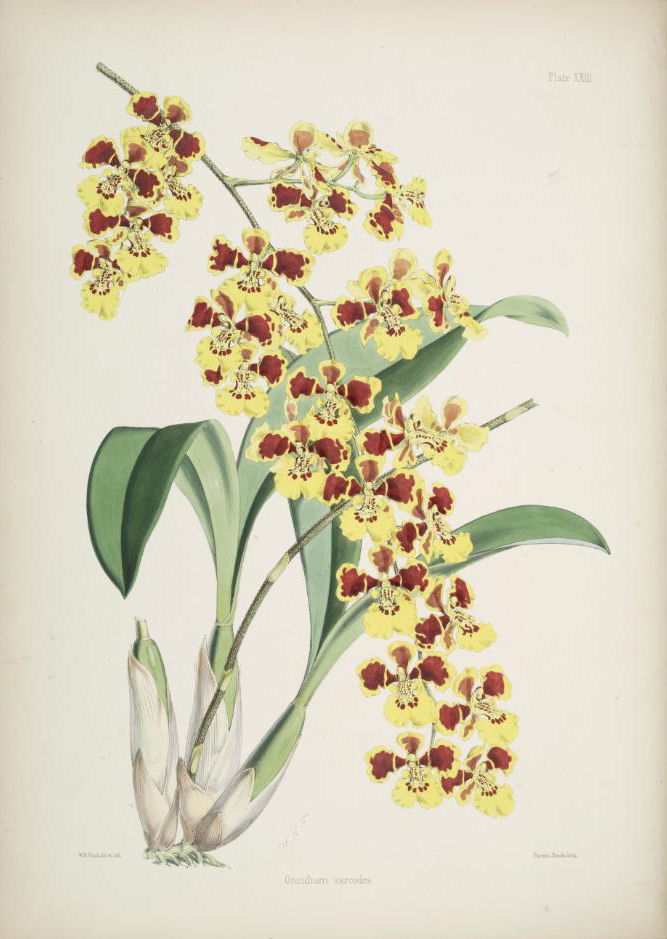

Scientific classification
- Kingdom: Plantae
- Clade: Tracheophytes
- Clade: Angiosperms
- Clade: Monocots
- Order: Asparagales
- Family: Orchidaceae
- Subfamily: Epidendroideae
- Genus: Oncidium
- Species: O. sarcodes

Binomial name
- Oncidium sarcodes Lindl.

Synonyms
- Oncidium rigbyanum Paxton; Baptistonia sarcodes (Lindl.) Chiron & V.P.Castro

= Oncidium sarcodes =

Species of orchid

Oncidium sarcodes is a Brazilian orchid.
