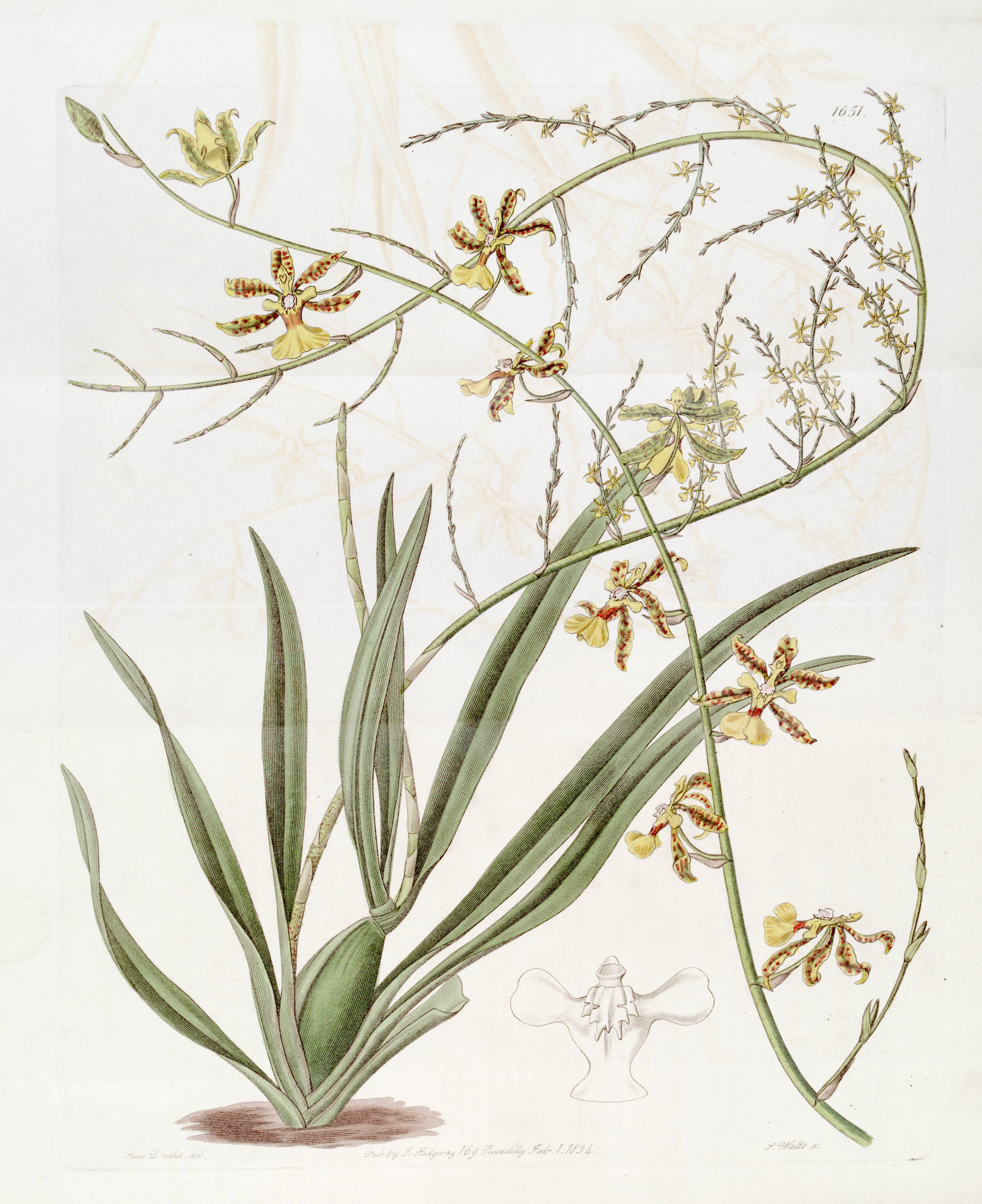
- Illustration by Sarah Drake

Scientific classification
- Kingdom: Plantae
- Clade: Tracheophytes
- Clade: Angiosperms
- Clade: Monocots
- Order: Asparagales
- Family: Orchidaceae
- Subfamily: Epidendroideae
- Genus: Oncidium
- Species: O. altissimum

Binomial name
- Oncidium altissimum (Jacq.) Sw. 1800

Synonyms
- Epidendrum altissimum Jacq.; Xeilyathum altissimum (Jacq.) Raf.; Oncidium forkelii Scheidw.; Oncidium wydleri Rchb.f.; Oncidium hannelorae Nir

= Oncidium altissimum =

Species of orchid

Oncidium altissimum, Wydler's dancing-lady orchid, is a species of orchid native to the West Indies (Cuba, Puerto Rico and the Lesser Antilles), with an 18th-Century citation from Jamaica.

This name should not be confused with the illegitimate homonym Oncidium altissimum Lindl. 1833, now considered a synonym of O. baueri native to South America. The true Oncidium altissimum was first described in 1760 by Nicolaus Joseph von Jacquin with the name Epidendrum altissimum, citing Jamaica as the origin of the specimen he was describing . Olof Swartz later transferred the species to Oncidium in 1800.
