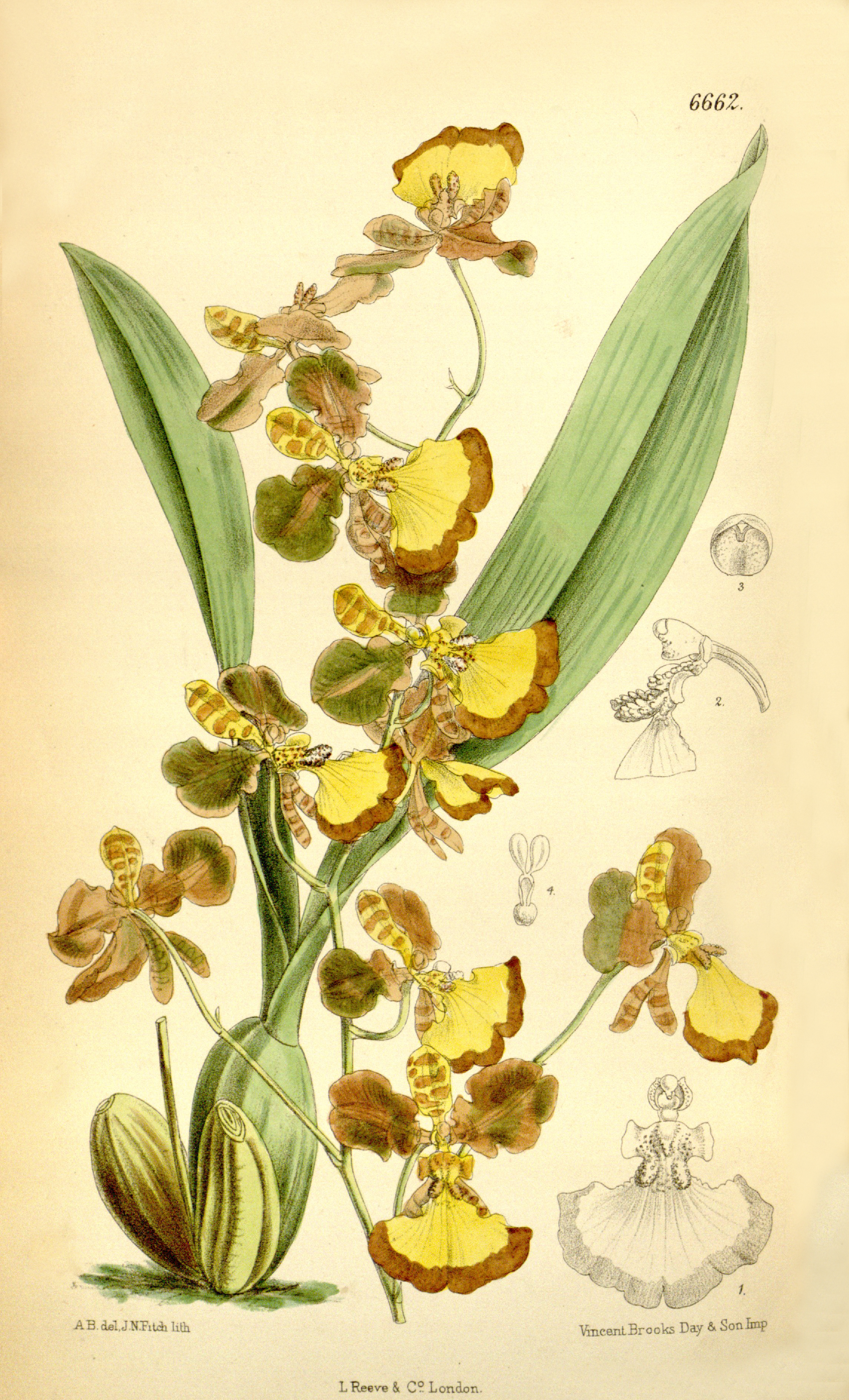

Scientific classification
- Kingdom: Plantae
- Clade: Embryophytes
- Clade: Tracheophytes
- Clade: Spermatophytes
- Clade: Angiosperms
- Clade: Monocots
- Order: Asparagales
- Family: Orchidaceae
- Subfamily: Epidendroideae
- Genus: Oncidium
- Species: O. praetextum

Binomial name
- Oncidium praetextum Rchb.f.

Synonyms
- Oncidium enderianum auct.; Brasilidium praetextum (Rchb.f.) Campacci

= Oncidium praetextum =

Species of orchid

Oncidium praetextum is a species of orchid endemic to southern and southeastern Brazil.
