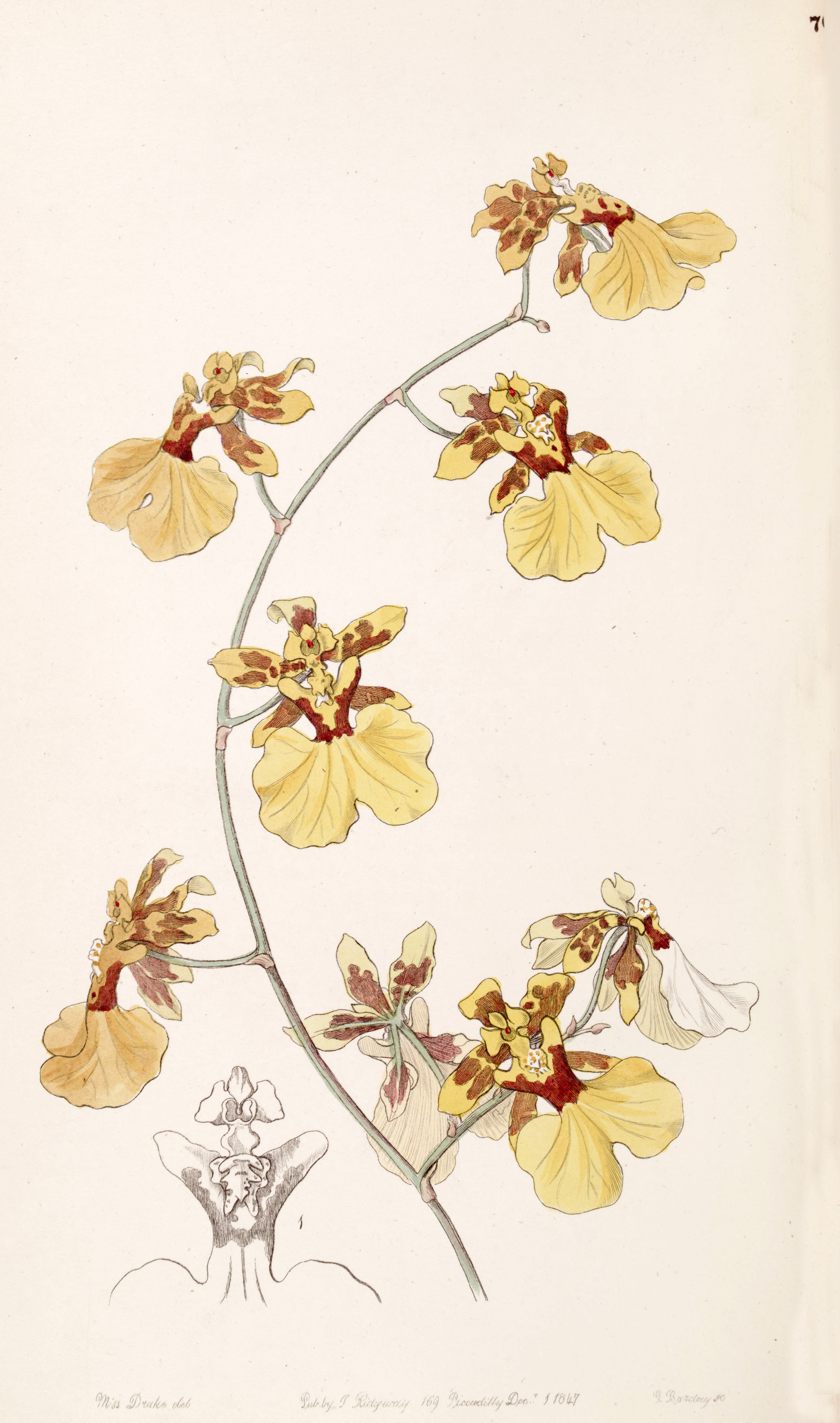

Scientific classification
- Kingdom: Plantae
- Clade: Tracheophytes
- Clade: Angiosperms
- Clade: Monocots
- Order: Asparagales
- Family: Orchidaceae
- Subfamily: Epidendroideae
- Genus: Oncidium
- Species: O. reflexum

Binomial name
- Oncidium reflexum Lindl.

Synonyms
- See text

= Oncidium reflexum =

Species of orchid

Oncidium reflexum is a species of orchid endemic to southwestern Mexico.

== Synonyms ==
- Oncidium funereum Lindl.
- Oncidium pelicanum Lindl.
- Oncidium suttonii Bateman ex Lindl.
- Oncidium suave Lindl.
- Oncidium macropterum A.Rich. & Galeotti
- Oncidium wendlandianum Rchb.f.
- Oncidium tayleurii Lindl.
- Oncidium reflexum var. intermedium Regel
- Oncidium acrochordonia Rchb.f. ex Kraenzl.
- Oncidium liebmannii Rchb.f. ex Kraenzl.
- Oncidium uncia Rchb.f. ex Kraenzl.
- Oncidium durangense Hágsater
