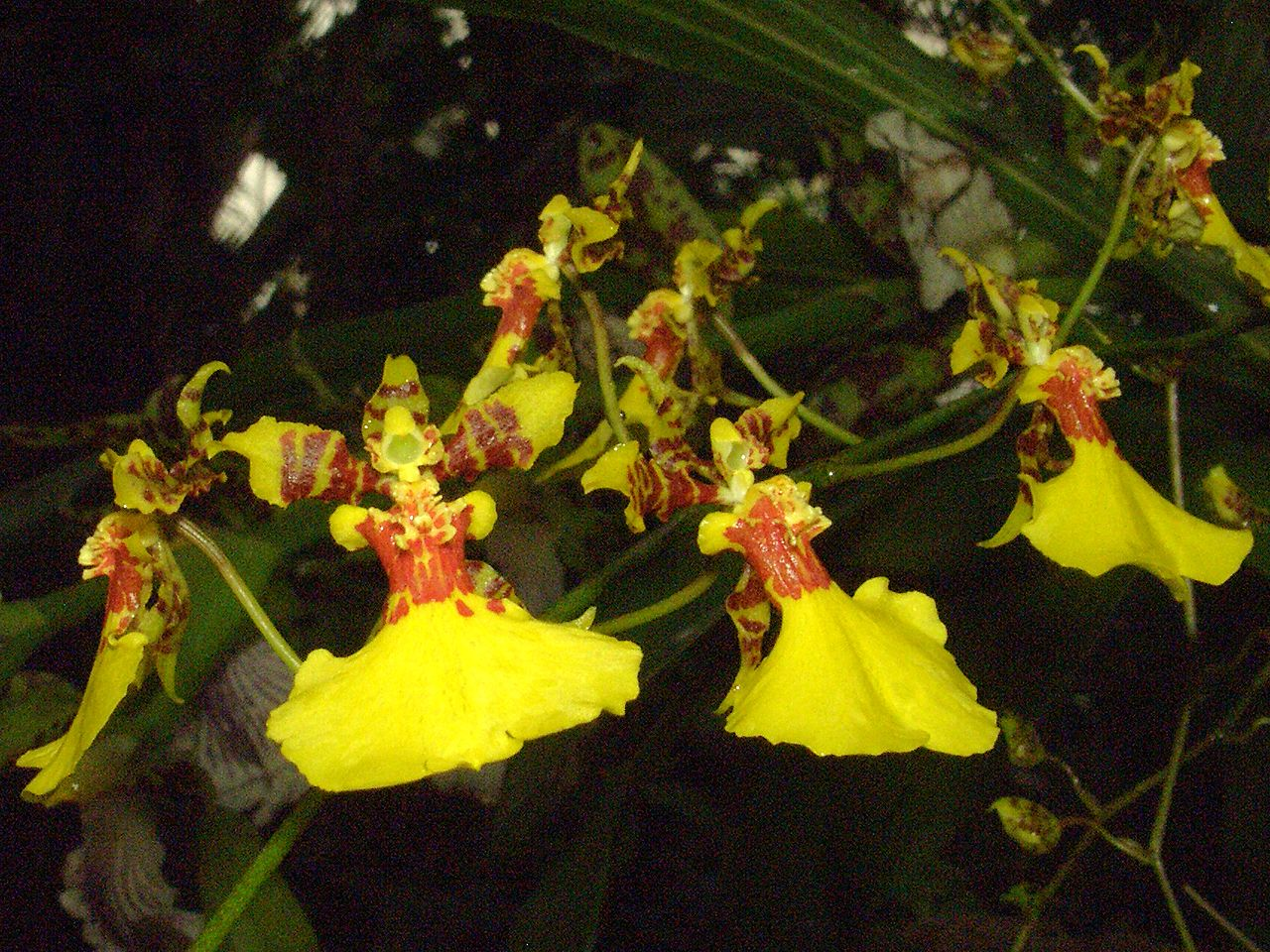

Scientific classification
- Kingdom: Plantae
- Clade: Tracheophytes
- Clade: Angiosperms
- Clade: Monocots
- Order: Asparagales
- Family: Orchidaceae
- Subfamily: Epidendroideae
- Genus: Oncidium
- Species: O. lineoligerum

Binomial name
- Oncidium lineoligerum Rchb.f. & Warsz.

Synonyms
- Oncidium stenotis Rchb.f.; Oncidium turialbae Schltr.

= Oncidium lineoligerum =

Species of orchid

Oncidium lineoligerum is a species of orchid occurring from Costa Rica to northern Peru.
