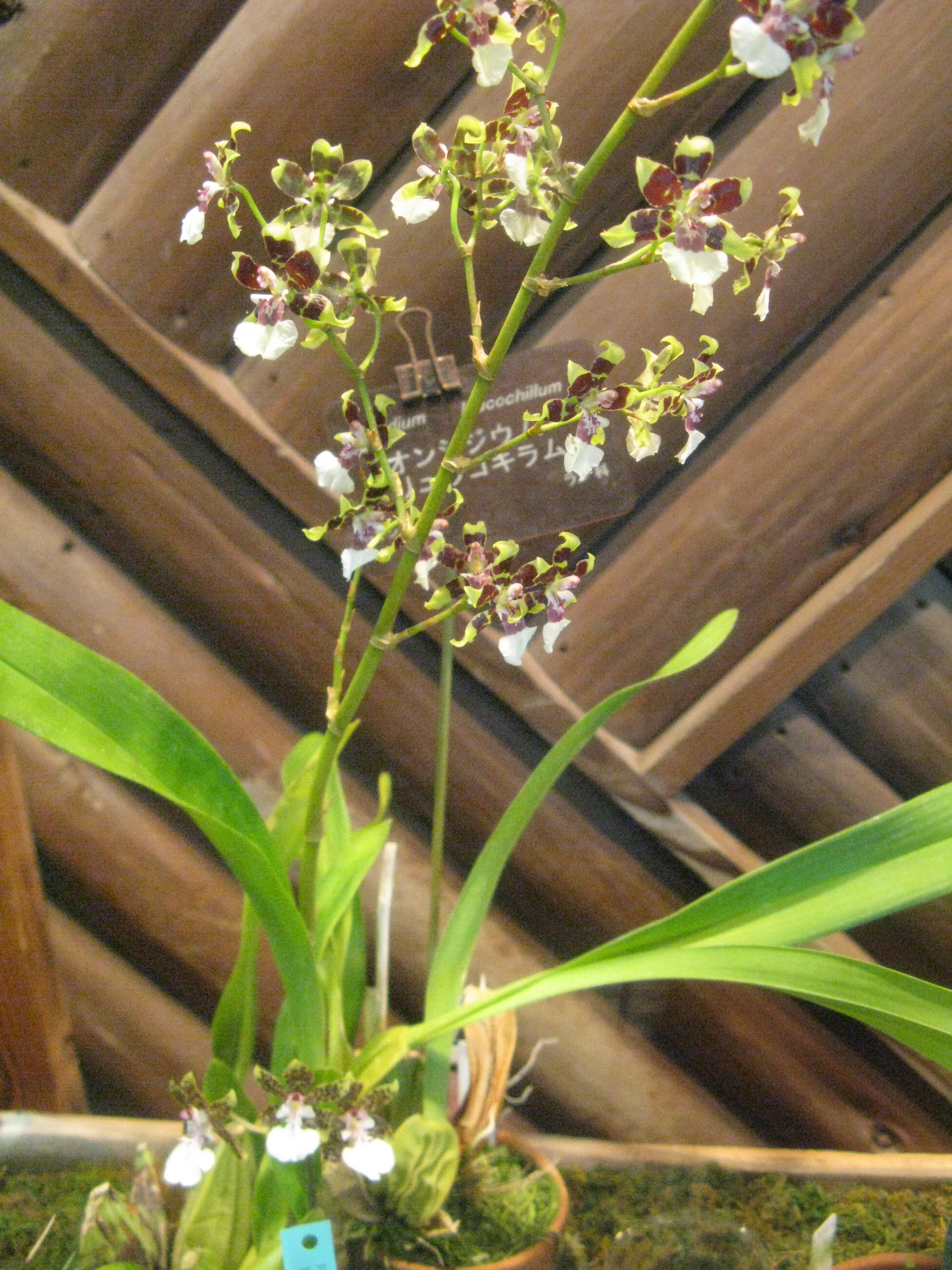

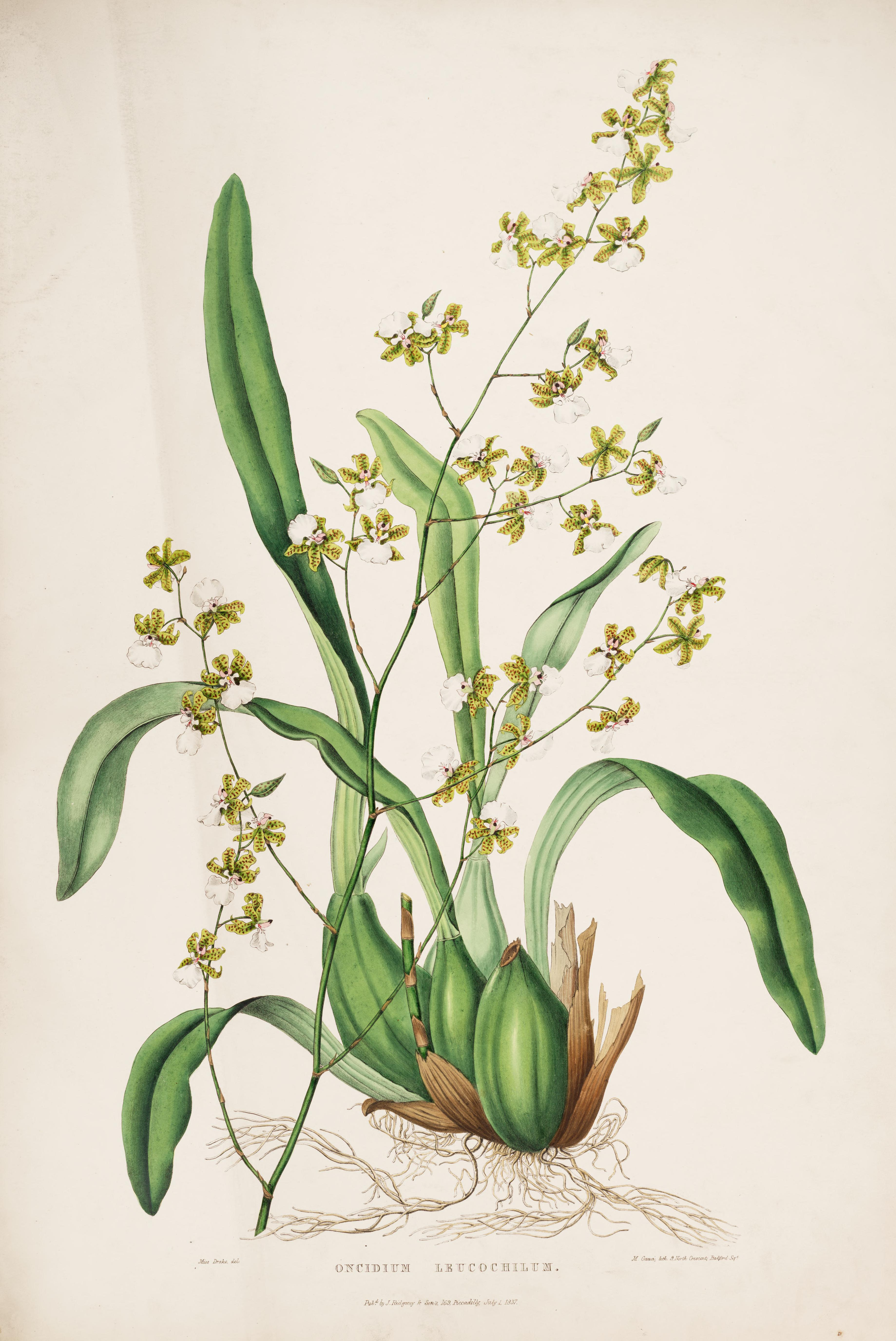
- Illustration by Sarah Ann Drake

Scientific classification
- Kingdom: Plantae
- Clade: Embryophytes
- Clade: Tracheophytes
- Clade: Angiosperms
- Clade: Monocots
- Order: Asparagales
- Family: Orchidaceae
- Subfamily: Epidendroideae
- Genus: Oncidium
- Species: O. leucochilum

Binomial name
- Oncidium leucochilum Bateman ex Lindl.

Synonyms
- Oncidium digitatum Lindl.; Oncidium polychromum Scheidw.; Cyrtochilum leucochilum Planch.; Oncidium leucochilum var. digitatum (Lindl.) Lindl.; Oncidium leucochilum f. speciosum Regel

= Oncidium leucochilum =

Species of orchid

Oncidium leucochilum (or white-lipped oncidium) is an epiphytic species of orchid that prefers cool climates to warm ones, and is found on trees in dry or humid forests, at an altitude of 2000 meters, from southeastern Mexico to Honduras.
