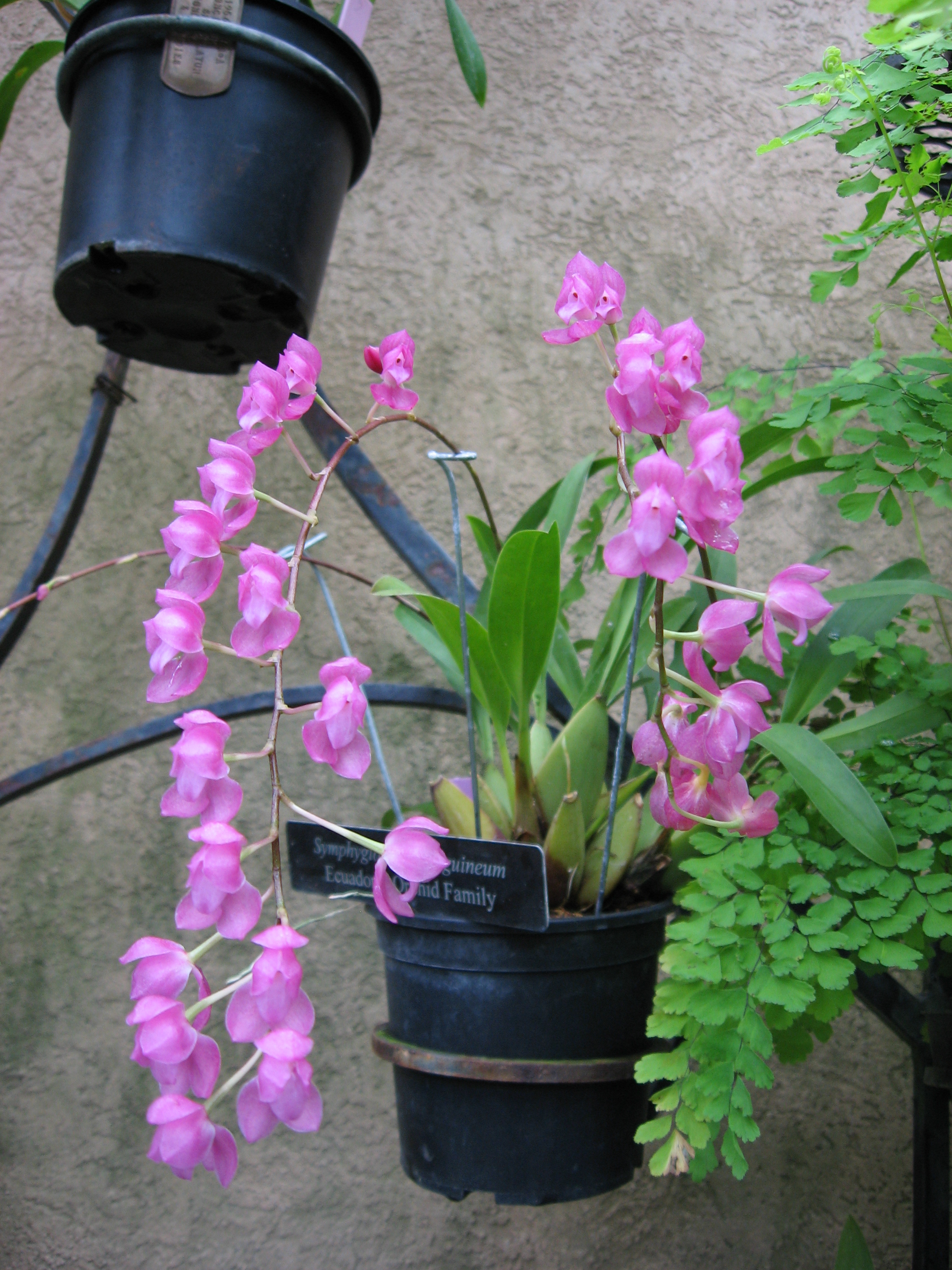

Scientific classification
- Kingdom: Plantae
- Clade: Tracheophytes
- Clade: Angiosperms
- Clade: Monocots
- Order: Asparagales
- Family: Orchidaceae
- Subfamily: Epidendroideae
- Genus: Oncidium
- Species: O. strictum

Binomial name
- Oncidium strictum (Cogn.) M.W.Chase & N.H.Williams

Synonyms
- Anachaste sanguinea Lindl.; Cochlioda sanguinea (Rchb.f.) Benth. & Hook.f.; Cochlioda stricta Cogn.; Mesospinidium sanguineum Rchb.f.; Odontoglossum sanguineum (Rchb.f.) Dalström; Symphyglossum ecuadorense Dodson & Garay; Symphyglossum sanguineum (Rchb.f.) Schltr.; Symphyglossum strictum (Cogn.) Schltr.

= Oncidium strictum =

Species of plant

Oncidium strictum is a species of flowering plant in the family Orchidaceae, native to Ecuador and Peru. It was first described in 1897 as Cochlioda stricta.
