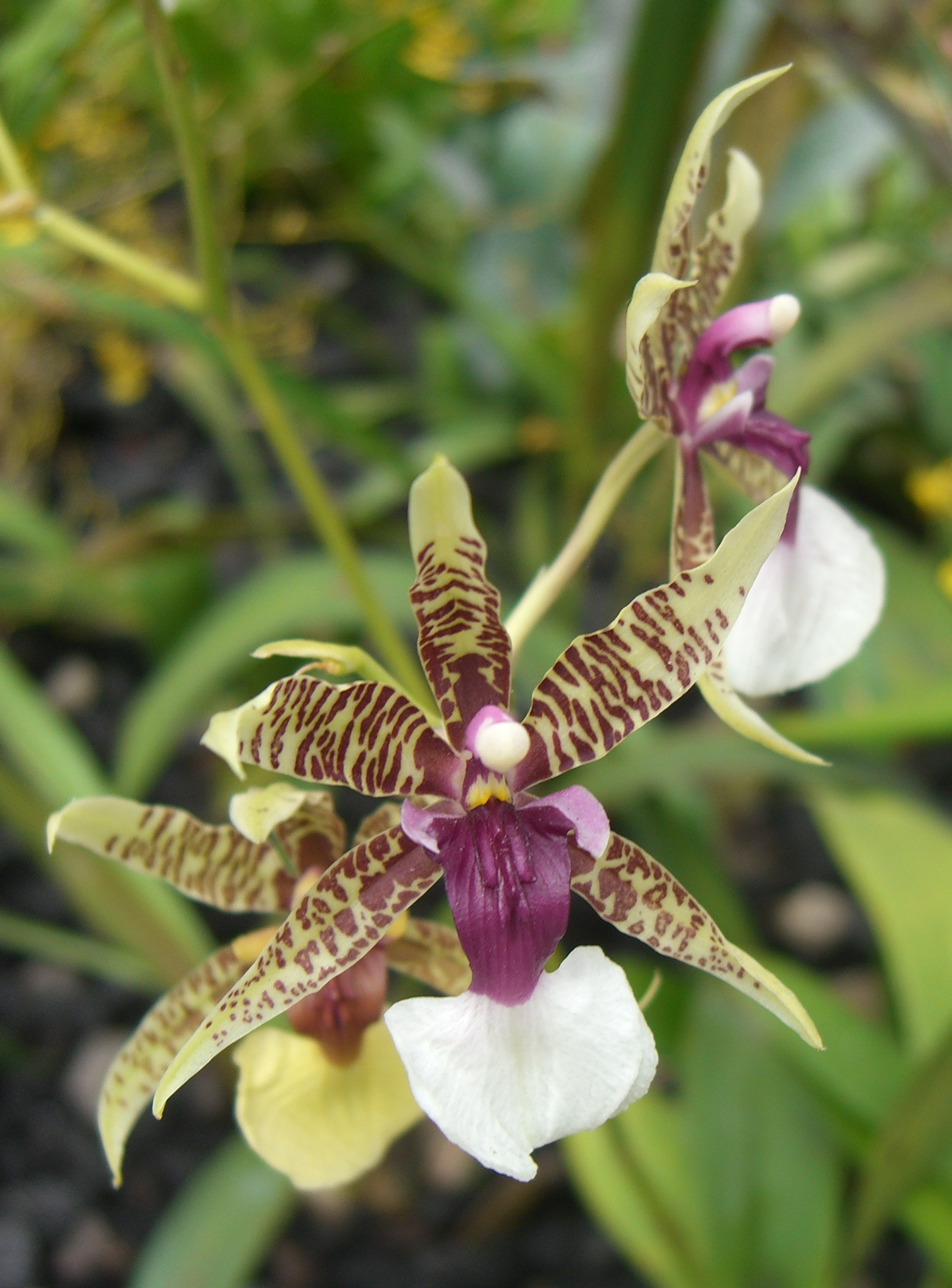

Scientific classification
- Kingdom: Plantae
- Clade: Tracheophytes
- Clade: Angiosperms
- Clade: Monocots
- Order: Asparagales
- Family: Orchidaceae
- Subfamily: Epidendroideae
- Genus: Oncidium
- Species: O. hastilabium

Binomial name
- Oncidium hastilabium (Lindl.) Beer

Synonyms
- Odontoglossum hastilabium Lindl. (basionym)

= Oncidium hastilabium =

Species of orchid

Oncidium hastilabium is a species of orchid found from northwestern Venezuela to western South America.
