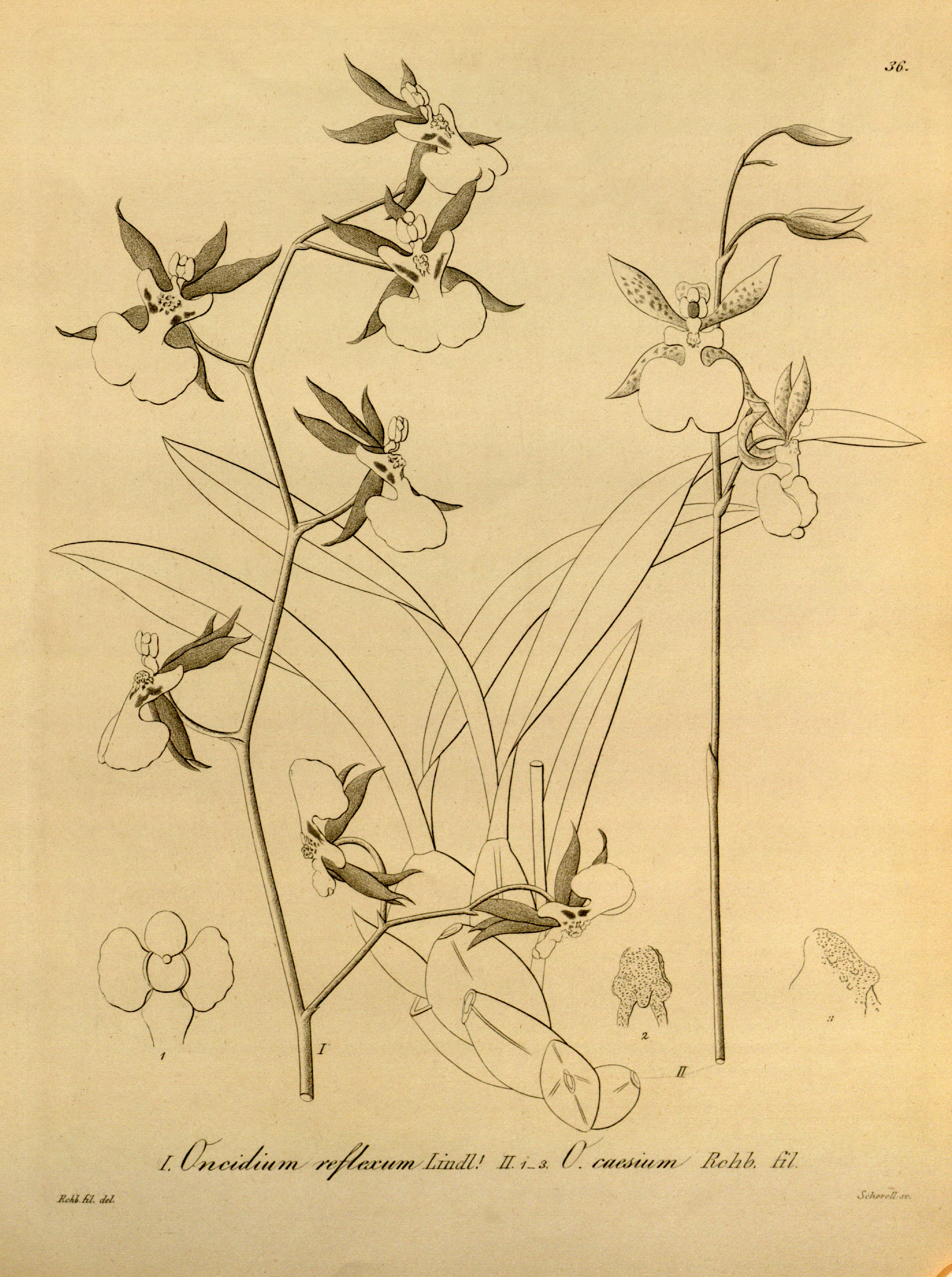
- Oncidium geertianum (fig. II, right)

Scientific classification
- Kingdom: Plantae
- Clade: Tracheophytes
- Clade: Angiosperms
- Clade: Monocots
- Order: Asparagales
- Family: Orchidaceae
- Subfamily: Epidendroideae
- Genus: Oncidium
- Species: O. geertianum

Binomial name
- Oncidium geertianum C.Morren

Synonyms
- Oncidium xanthochlorum Klotzsch; Oncidium caesium Rchb.f.

= Oncidium geertianum =

Species of orchid

Oncidium geertianum is a species of orchid native to central and southwestern Mexico.
