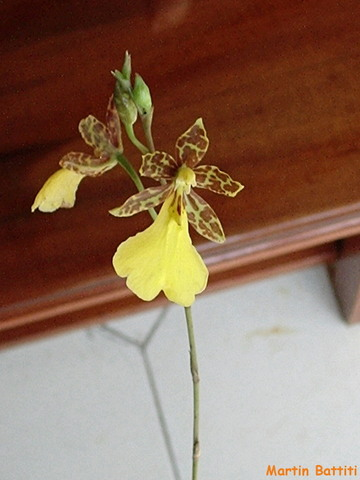

Scientific classification
- Kingdom: Plantae
- Clade: Tracheophytes
- Clade: Angiosperms
- Clade: Monocots
- Order: Asparagales
- Family: Orchidaceae
- Subfamily: Epidendroideae
- Genus: Oncidium
- Species: O. graminifolium

Binomial name
- Oncidium graminifolium (Lindl.) Lindl.

Synonyms
- List: Concocidium graminifolium (Lindl.) Romowicz & Szlach.; Cyrtochilum filipes Lindl.; Cyrtochilum graminifolium Lindl.; Oncidium filipes (Lindl.) Lindl.; Oncidium graminifolium var. filipes (Lindl.) Lindl.; Oncidium graminifolium var. holochilum Lindl.; Oncidium graminifolium var. wrayae (Hook.) Lindl.; Oncidium wrayae Hook.

= Oncidium graminifolium =

Species of orchid

Oncidium graminifolium is a species of orchid occurring from Mexico to Central America.
