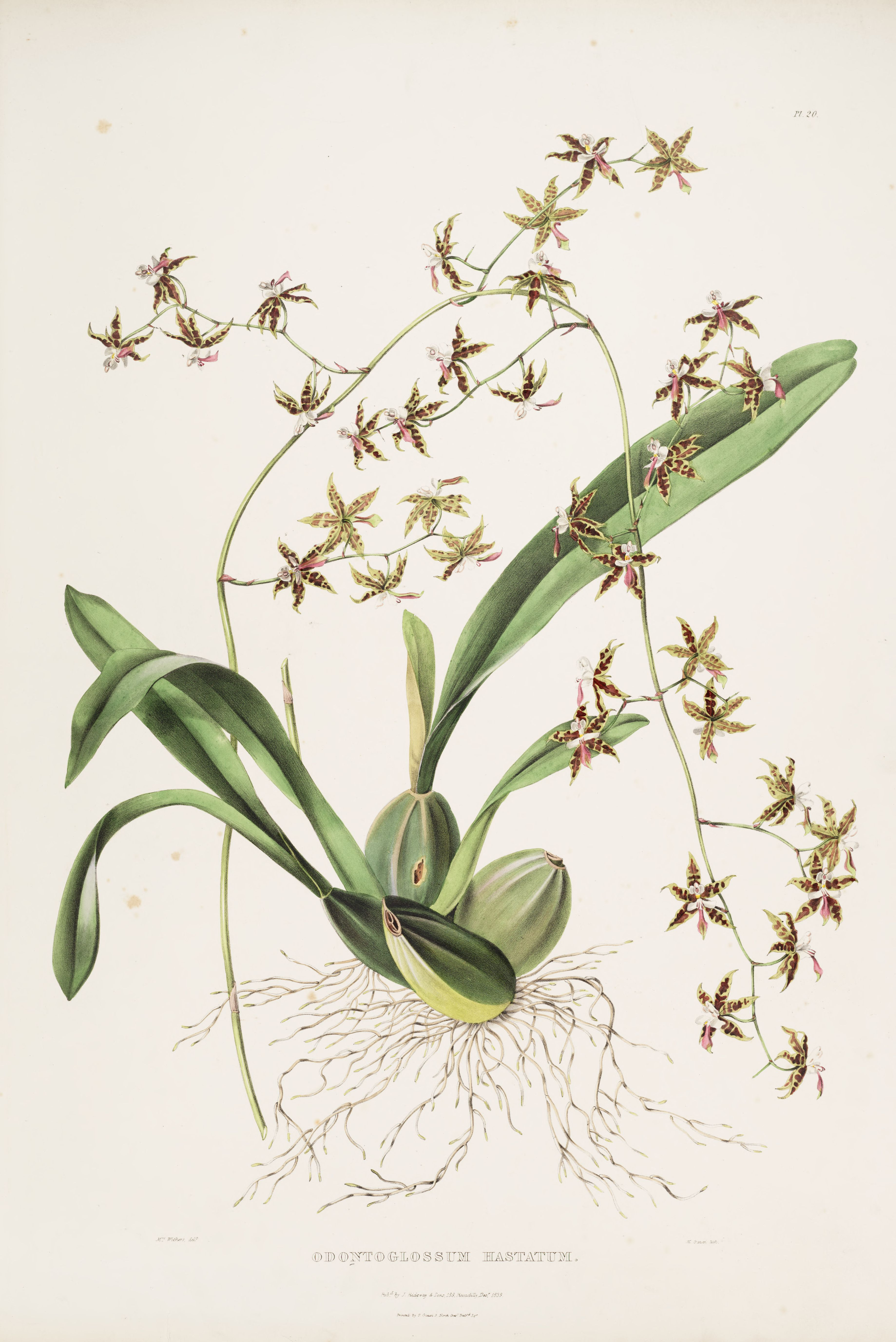

Scientific classification
- Kingdom: Plantae
- Clade: Tracheophytes
- Clade: Angiosperms
- Clade: Monocots
- Order: Asparagales
- Family: Orchidaceae
- Subfamily: Epidendroideae
- Genus: Oncidium
- Species: O. hastatum

Binomial name
- Oncidium hastatum (Bateman) Lindl.

Synonyms
- Odontoglossum hastatum Bateman (basionym); Odontoglossum phyllochilum C.Morren; Cyrtochilum jurgensenianum Lem.; Oncidium jurgensenianum (Lem.) Lem.; Oncidium phyllochilum (C.Morren) Beer; Oncidium hastatum var. atratum Lindl.; Oncidium hastatum var. flavescens Lindl.; Oncidium hastatum var. roezlii Rchb.f.; Oncidium hastatum var. hemimelaenum Rchb.f.; Oncidium stelligerum var. ernestii B.S.Williams

= Oncidium hastatum =

Species of orchid

Oncidium hastatum is a species of orchid native to Mexico and Honduras.
