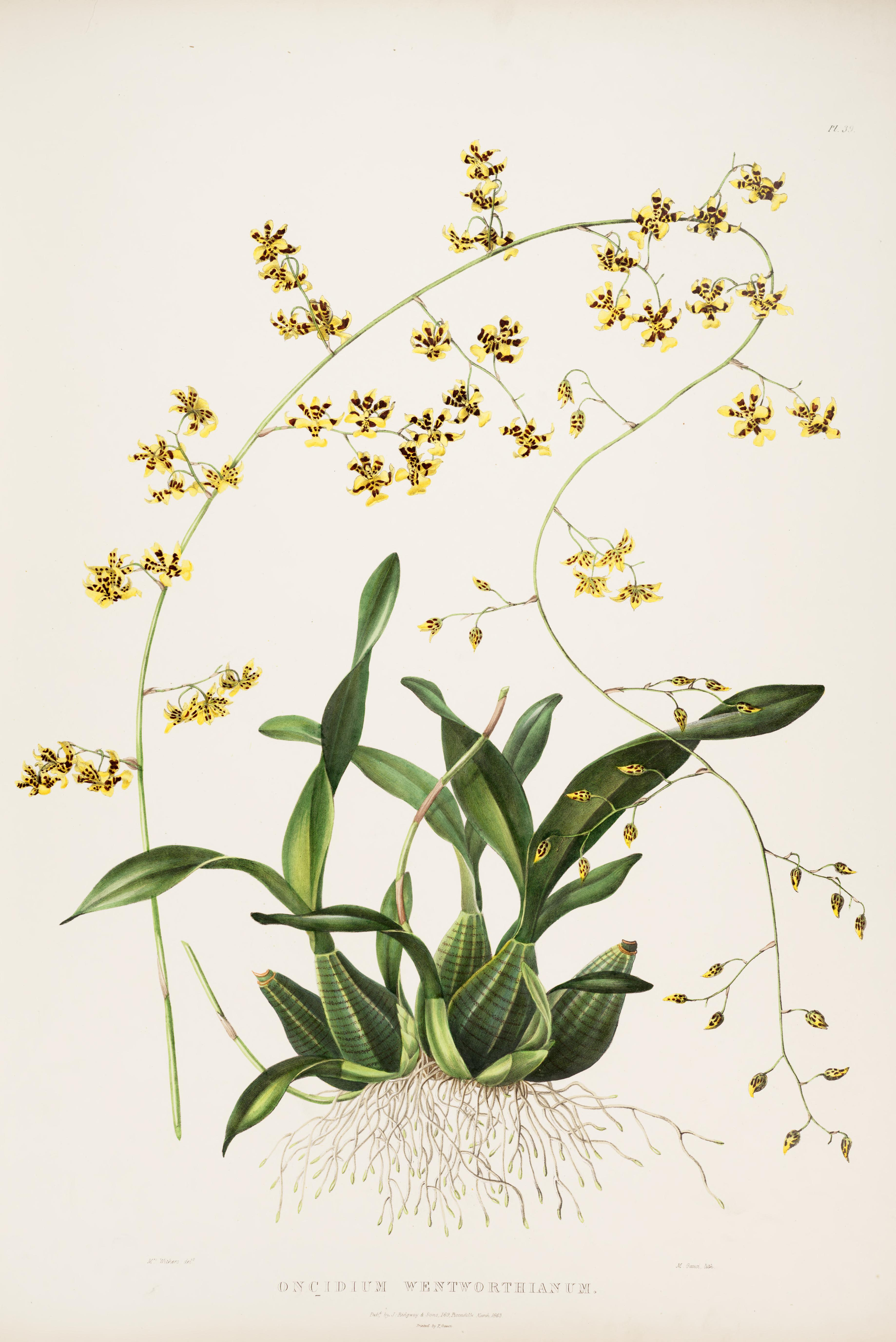

Scientific classification
- Kingdom: Plantae
- Clade: Tracheophytes
- Clade: Angiosperms
- Clade: Monocots
- Order: Asparagales
- Family: Orchidaceae
- Subfamily: Epidendroideae
- Genus: Oncidium
- Species: O. wentworthianum

Binomial name
- Oncidium wentworthianum Bateman ex Lindl.

Synonyms
- Oncidium hagsaterianum R.Jiménez & Soto Arenas

= Oncidium wentworthianum =

Species of orchid

Oncidium wentworthianum is a species of orchid occurring from Mexico through Guatemala to El Salvador. It was discovered in Guatemala
