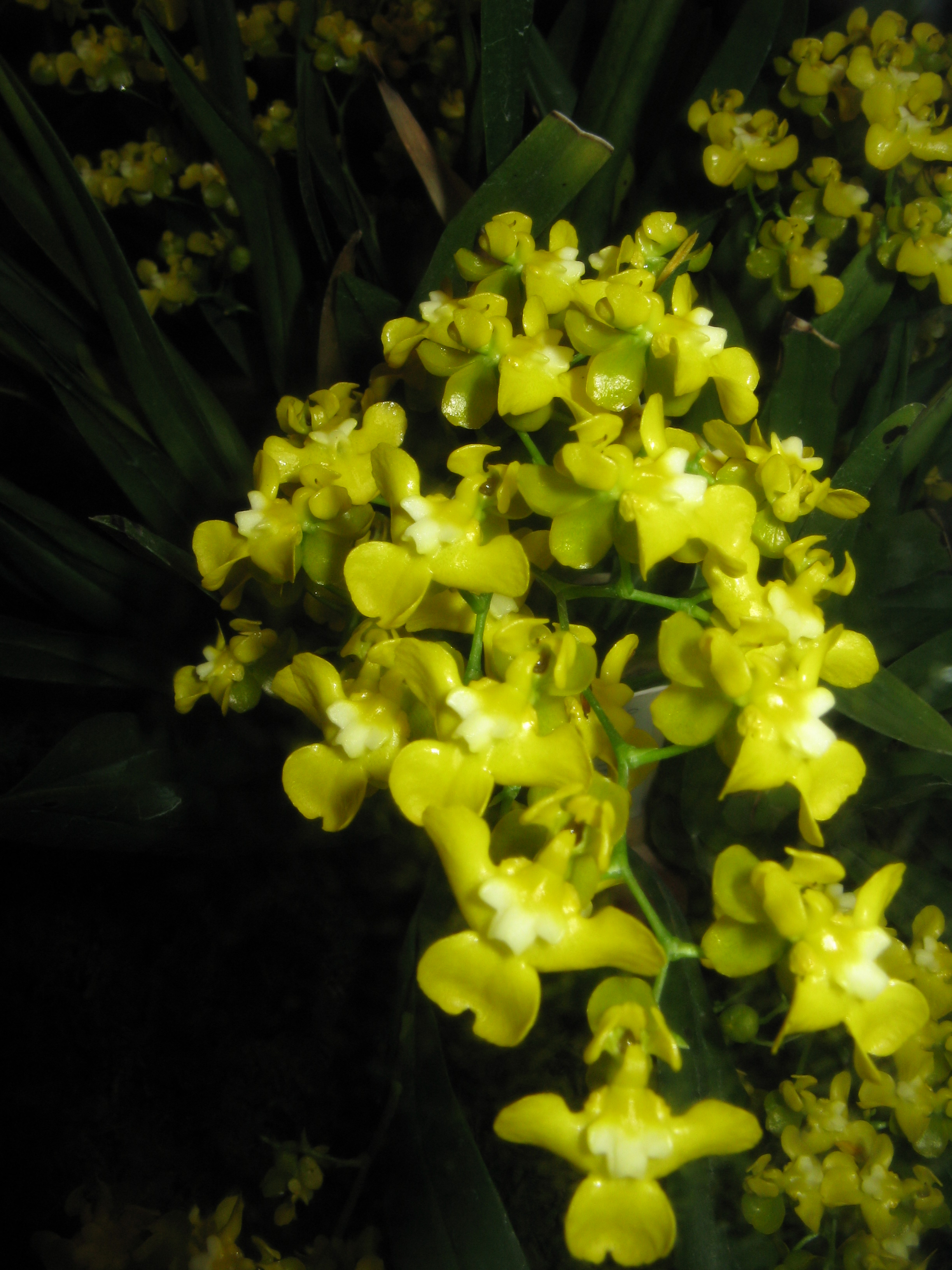

Scientific classification
- Kingdom: Plantae
- Clade: Tracheophytes
- Clade: Angiosperms
- Clade: Monocots
- Order: Asparagales
- Family: Orchidaceae
- Subfamily: Epidendroideae
- Genus: Oncidium
- Species: O. cheirophorum

Binomial name
- Oncidium cheirophorum Rchb.f.

Synonyms
- Oncidium dielsianum Kraenzl.; Oncidium macrorhynchum Kraenzl.; Oncidium cheirophorum var. exauriculatum Hamer & Garay; Oncidium exauriculatum (Hamer & Garay) R.Jiménez

= Oncidium cheirophorum =

Species of orchid

Oncidium cheirophorum is a species of orchid found from Chiapas state in SW Mexico, through Central America, to Colombia. The flowers of this plant are yellow and shiny, and have a slight fragrance.
