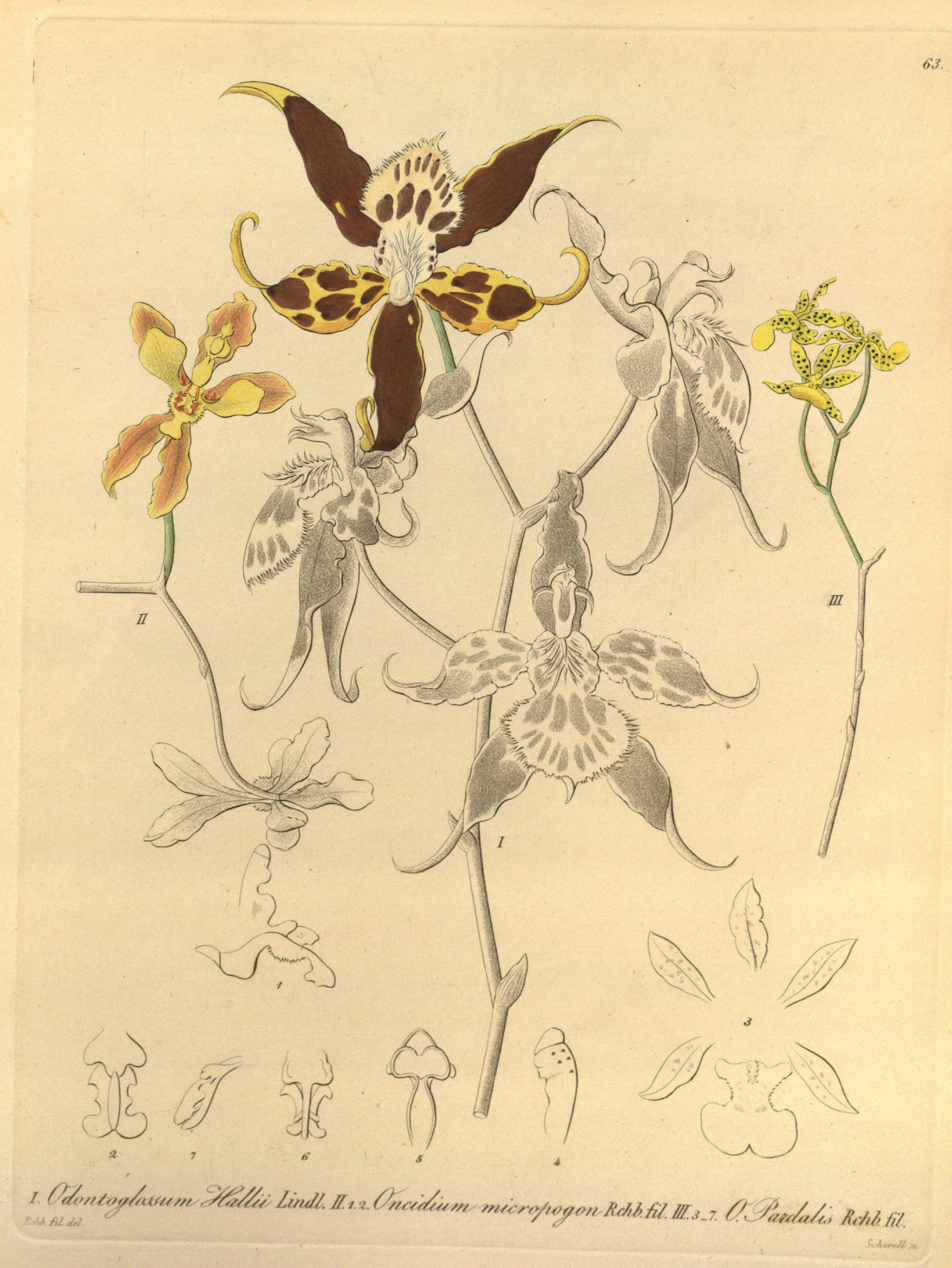
- Oncidium lentiginosum (fig. III, right)

Scientific classification
- Kingdom: Plantae
- Clade: Tracheophytes
- Clade: Angiosperms
- Clade: Monocots
- Order: Asparagales
- Family: Orchidaceae
- Subfamily: Epidendroideae
- Genus: Oncidium
- Species: O. lentiginosum

Binomial name
- Oncidium lentiginosum Rchb.f.

Synonyms
- Oncidium pardalis Rchb.f.

= Oncidium lentiginosum =

Species of orchid

Oncidium lentiginosum is a species of orchid occurring from Colombia to northern Venezuela.

It was first described by Heinrich Gustav Reichenbach.
