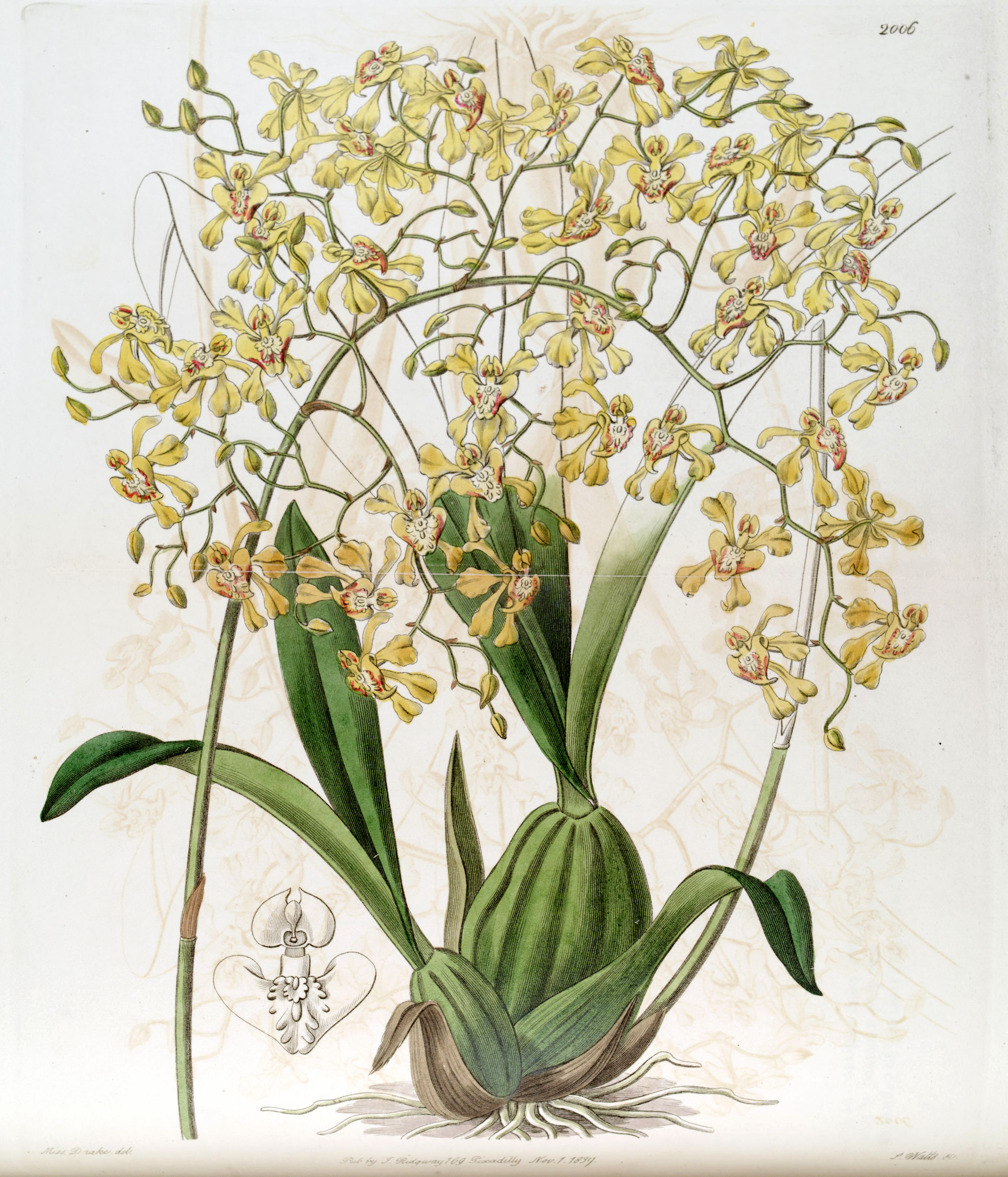

Scientific classification
- Kingdom: Plantae
- Clade: Tracheophytes
- Clade: Angiosperms
- Clade: Monocots
- Order: Asparagales
- Family: Orchidaceae
- Subfamily: Epidendroideae
- Genus: Oncidium
- Species: O. deltoideum

Binomial name
- Oncidium deltoideum Lindl.

Synonyms
- Cyrtochilum deltoideum (Lindl.) Kraenzl.

= Oncidium deltoideum =

Species of orchid

Oncidium deltoideum is a species of orchid found from southern Ecuador to northern Peru.
