= × Odontioda =

Genus of orchids

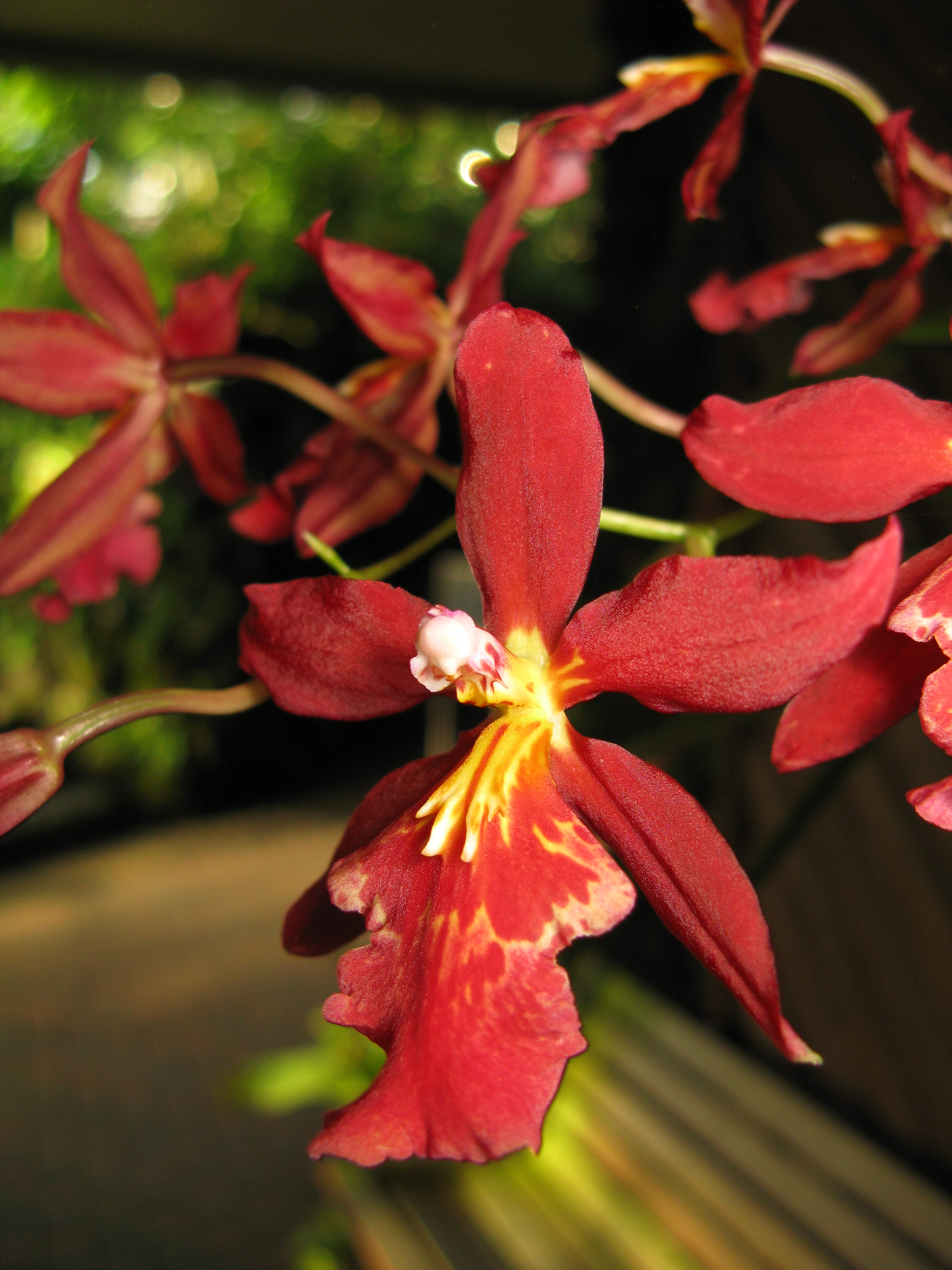
Oncidium cultivar formerly treated as × Odontioda Picasso 'Rubis'

× Odontioda, abbreviated Oda. in horticulture, was a nothogenus of orchids, set up for plants produced by crosses between the genera Odontoglossum and Cochlioda. As of April 2026, both genera were treated as synonyms of Oncidium, so that plants treated formerly as × Odontioda fall within Oncidium.
