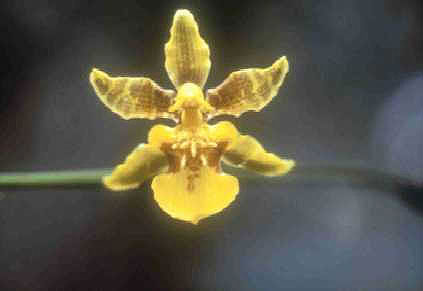

Conservation status
- Least Concern (IUCN 3.1)

Scientific classification
- Kingdom: Plantae
- Clade: Tracheophytes
- Clade: Angiosperms
- Clade: Monocots
- Order: Asparagales
- Family: Orchidaceae
- Subfamily: Epidendroideae
- Genus: Oncidium
- Species: O. ensatum

Binomial name
- Oncidium ensatum Lindl.

Synonyms
- Oncidium cerebriferum Rchb.f.; Oncidium confusum Rchb.f.; Cyrtopodium verrucosum Griseb.; Oncidium floridanum Ames

= Oncidium ensatum =

Species of orchid

Oncidium ensatum, the Latin American orchid or Florida dancinglady orchid, is a species of orchid found in southern Florida, southern Mexico (Chiapas and the Yucatán Peninsula), Central America, Cuba, the Bahamas, and northwestern Venezuela.

Oncidium ensatum is usually epiphytic but sometimes terrestrial, up to 100 cm (39 in) tall (not including the inflorescence). The leaves are narrowly linear to lanceolate, each up to 10 cm (3.9 in) long. The inflorescence is either arching or hanging, up to 250 cm (98 in) long. The flowers are yellow with brown spots.
