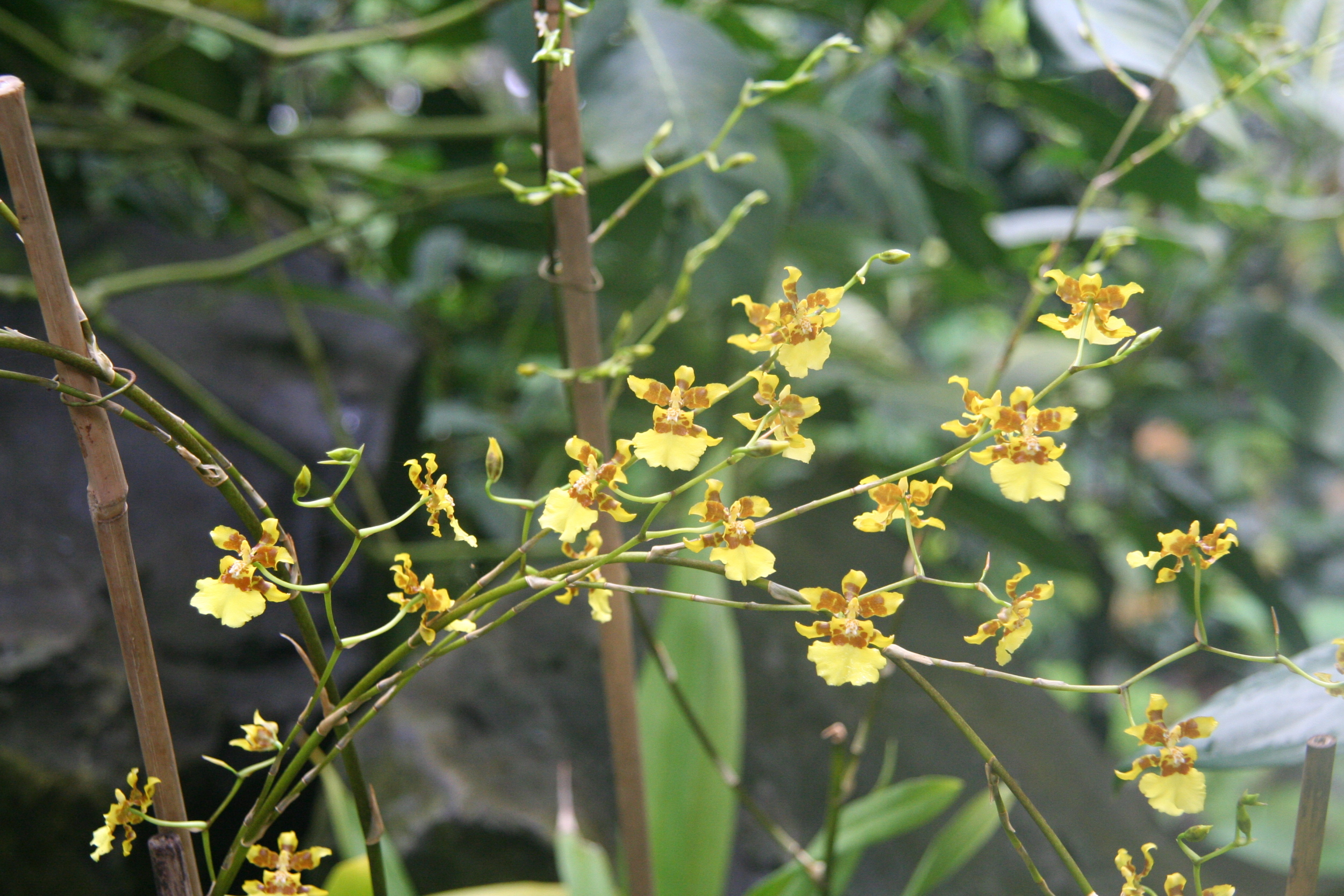

Scientific classification
- Kingdom: Plantae
- Clade: Tracheophytes
- Clade: Angiosperms
- Clade: Monocots
- Order: Asparagales
- Family: Orchidaceae
- Subfamily: Epidendroideae
- Genus: Oncidium
- Species: O. sphacelatum

Binomial name
- Oncidium sphacelatum Lindl.

Synonyms
- Oncidium schrautianum Königer; Oncidium sphacelatum var. majus Lindl.; Oncidium sphacelatum var. minus Lindl.; Oncidium stenostalix Rchb.f. ex Kraenzl.

= Oncidium sphacelatum =

Species of orchid

Oncidium sphacelatum is a species of orchid ranging from Mexico to Central America and southeastern Venezuela. It is known as Kandyan dancer orchid in Sri Lanka due to its resemblance to a Kandyan dancer.
