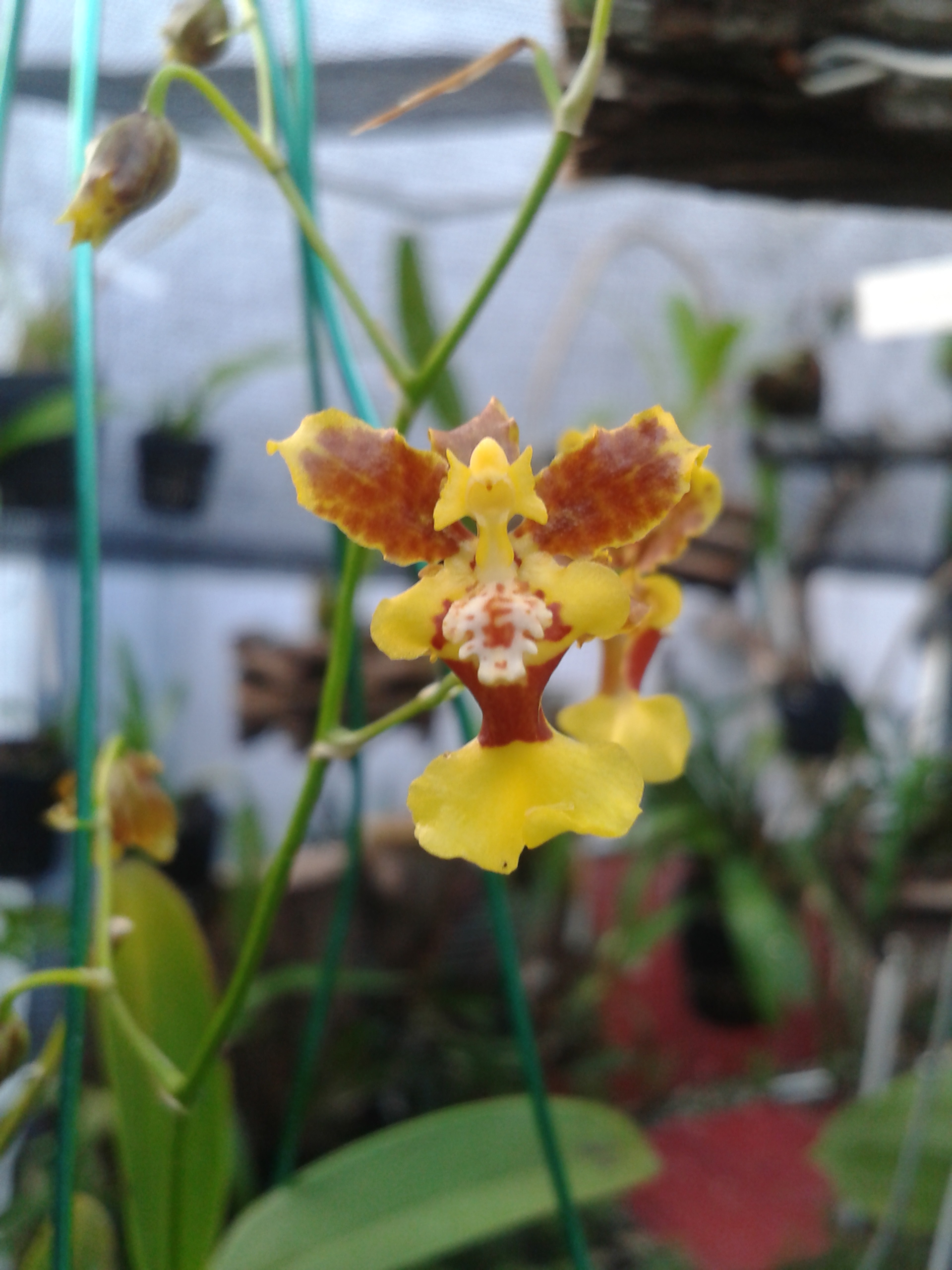

Scientific classification
- Kingdom: Plantae
- Clade: Tracheophytes
- Clade: Angiosperms
- Clade: Monocots
- Order: Asparagales
- Family: Orchidaceae
- Subfamily: Epidendroideae
- Genus: Oncidium
- Species: O. dichromaticum

Binomial name
- Oncidium dichromaticum Rchb.f.

Synonyms
- Oncidium andreae; Oncidium cabagrae; Oncidium rechingerianum

= Oncidium dichromaticum =

Species of plant

Oncidium dichromaticum is a species of orchid native to 20–1500 m altitude of the Andes Mountains region of Colombia, Costa Rica, and Panama.
