= × Odontocidium =

Genus of orchids

× Odontocidium, abbreviated as Odcdm. in the horticultural trade, was a nothogenus of orchids, set up for plants produced by crosses between the genera Odontoglossum and Oncidium. As of April 2026, Odontoglossum was treated as a synonym of Oncidium, so that plants correctly treated formerly as × Odontocidium fall within Oncidium.
