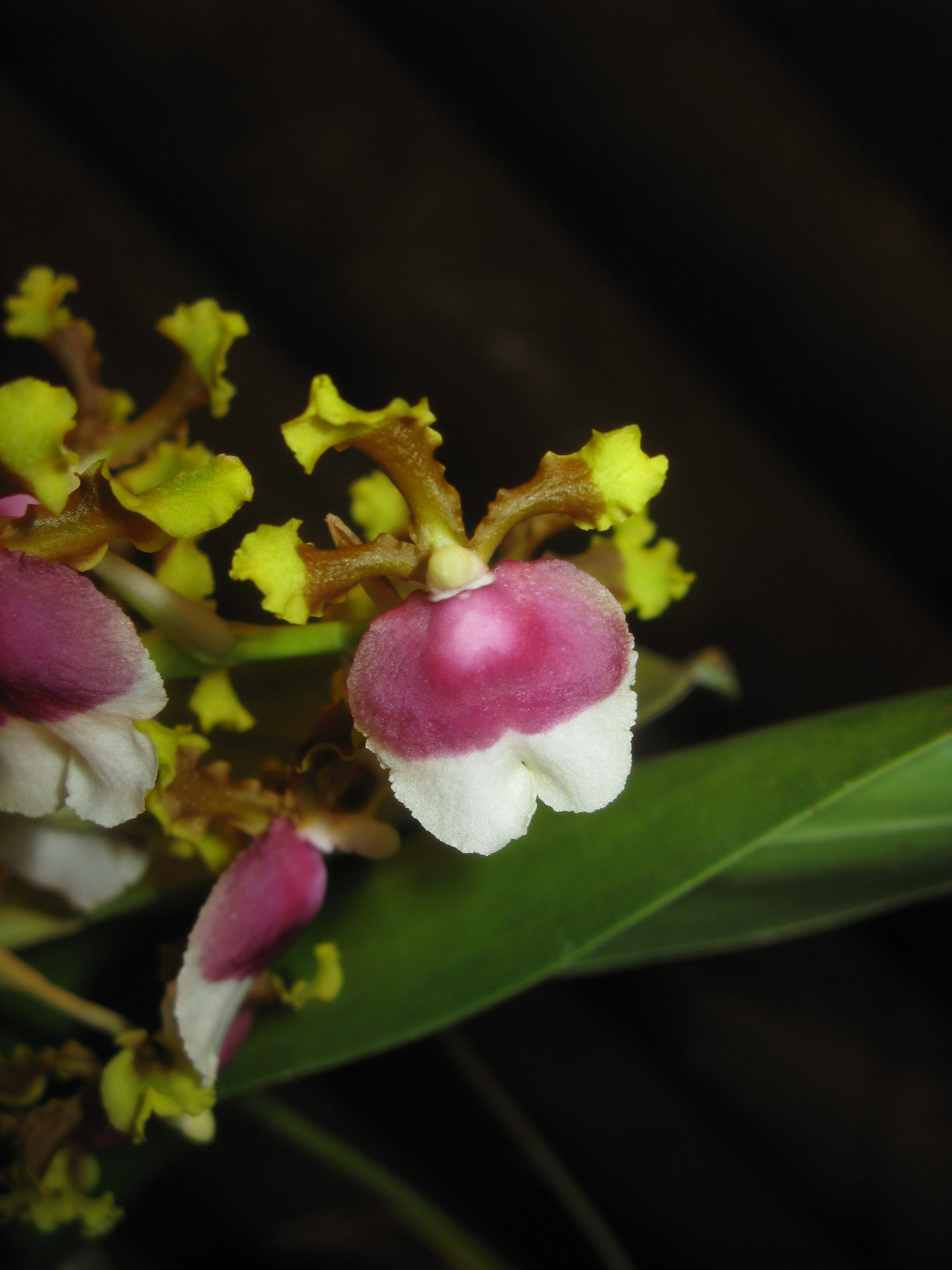

Scientific classification
- Kingdom: Plantae
- Clade: Tracheophytes
- Clade: Angiosperms
- Clade: Monocots
- Order: Asparagales
- Family: Orchidaceae
- Subfamily: Epidendroideae
- Genus: Oncidium
- Species: O. fuscatum

Binomial name
- Oncidium fuscatum Rchb.f.

Synonyms
- Miltonia warszewiczii Rchb.f. (basionym); Odontoglossum weltonii auct.; Oncidium weltonii (auct.) W.Bull ex Regel; Miltonioides warszewiczii (Rchb.f.) Brieger & Lückel; Chamaeleorchis warszewiczii (Rchb.f.) Senghas & Lückel

= Oncidium fuscatum =

Species of orchid

Oncidium fuscatum is a species of orchid occurring from Panama to Peru.
