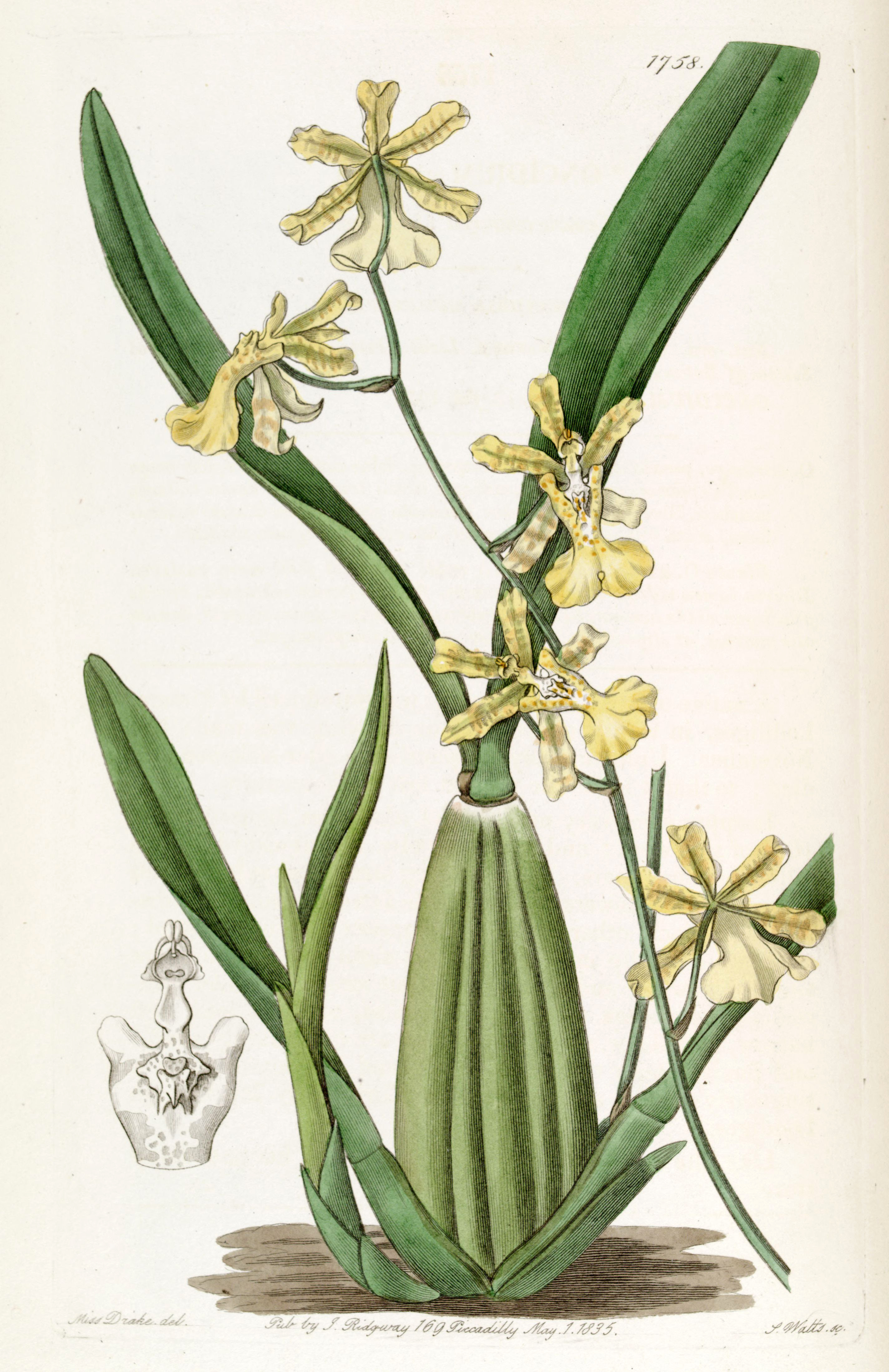

Scientific classification
- Kingdom: Plantae
- Clade: Tracheophytes
- Clade: Angiosperms
- Clade: Monocots
- Order: Asparagales
- Family: Orchidaceae
- Subfamily: Epidendroideae
- Genus: Oncidium
- Species: O. citrinum

Binomial name
- Oncidium citrinum Lindl.

Synonyms
- Oncidium citrinum var. rotundatum Regel; Oncidium citrinum var. verum Regel

= Oncidium citrinum =

Species of orchid

Oncidium citrinum is a species of orchid found from Colombia to Trinidad. It grows up to 35 cm tall.
