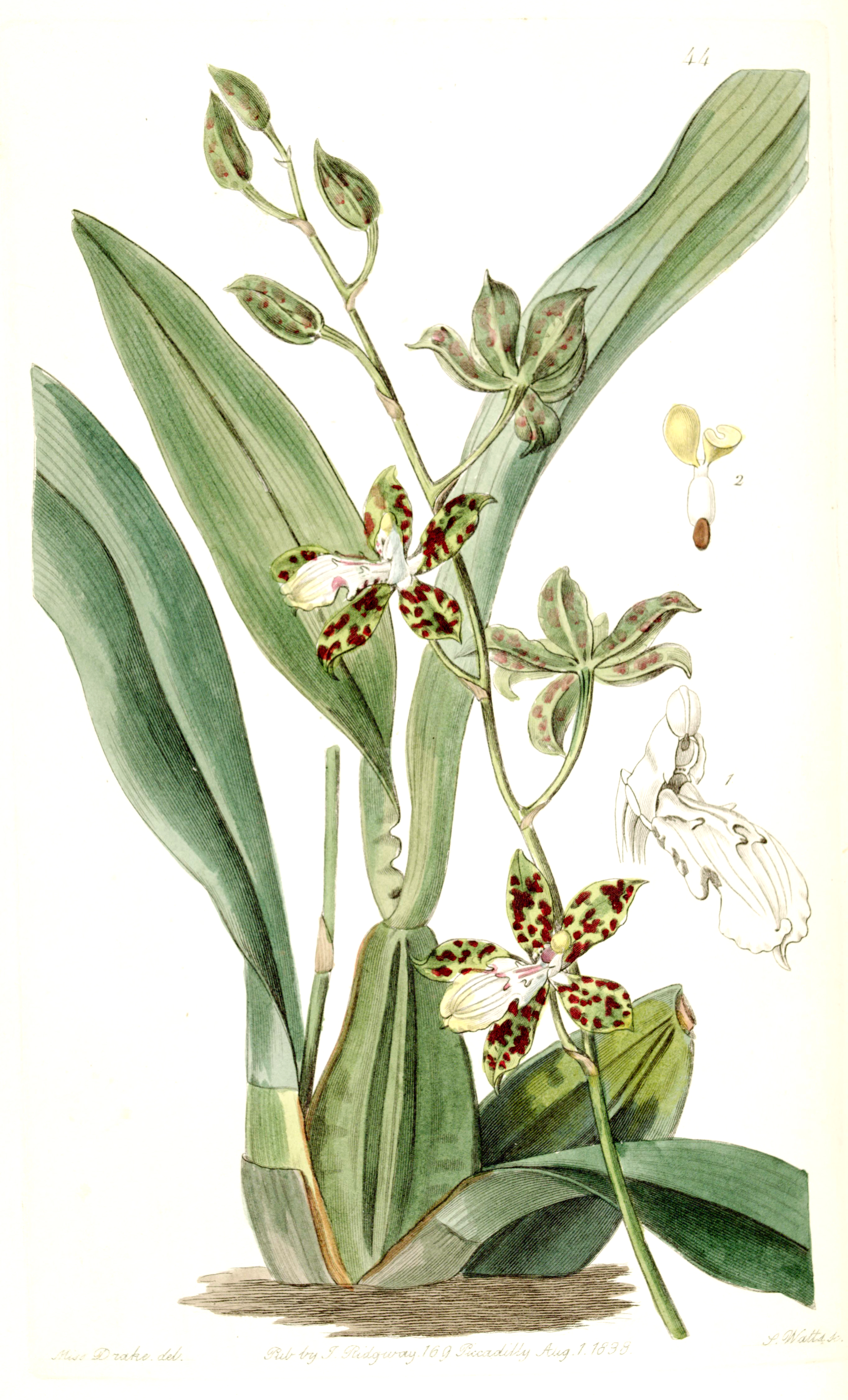

Scientific classification
- Kingdom: Plantae
- Clade: Tracheophytes
- Clade: Angiosperms
- Clade: Monocots
- Order: Asparagales
- Family: Orchidaceae
- Subfamily: Epidendroideae
- Genus: Oncidium
- Species: O. maculatum

Binomial name
- Oncidium maculatum (Lindl.) Lindl.

Synonyms
- See text

= Oncidium maculatum =

Species of orchid

Oncidium maculatum is a species of orchid occurring from Mexico to Central America. The orchid has yellow-green flowers.

== Synonyms ==
Cyrtochilum maculatum Lindl. is the basionym. Other synonyms include:

- Oncidium funereum Lex.
- Cyrtochilum maculatum var. ecornutum Hook.
- Cyrtochilum maculatum var. parviflorum Lindl.
- Odontoglossum lindleyi Galeotti ex Lindl.
- Oncidium maculatum var. psittacinum Rchb.f. ex Lindl.
- Oncidium psittacinum Linden ex Lindl.
- Oncidium tigrinum Lindl.
- Oncidium lintriculus Kraenzl.
- Oncidium sawyeri L.O.Williams
- Odontoglossum johnsonorum L.O.Williams
