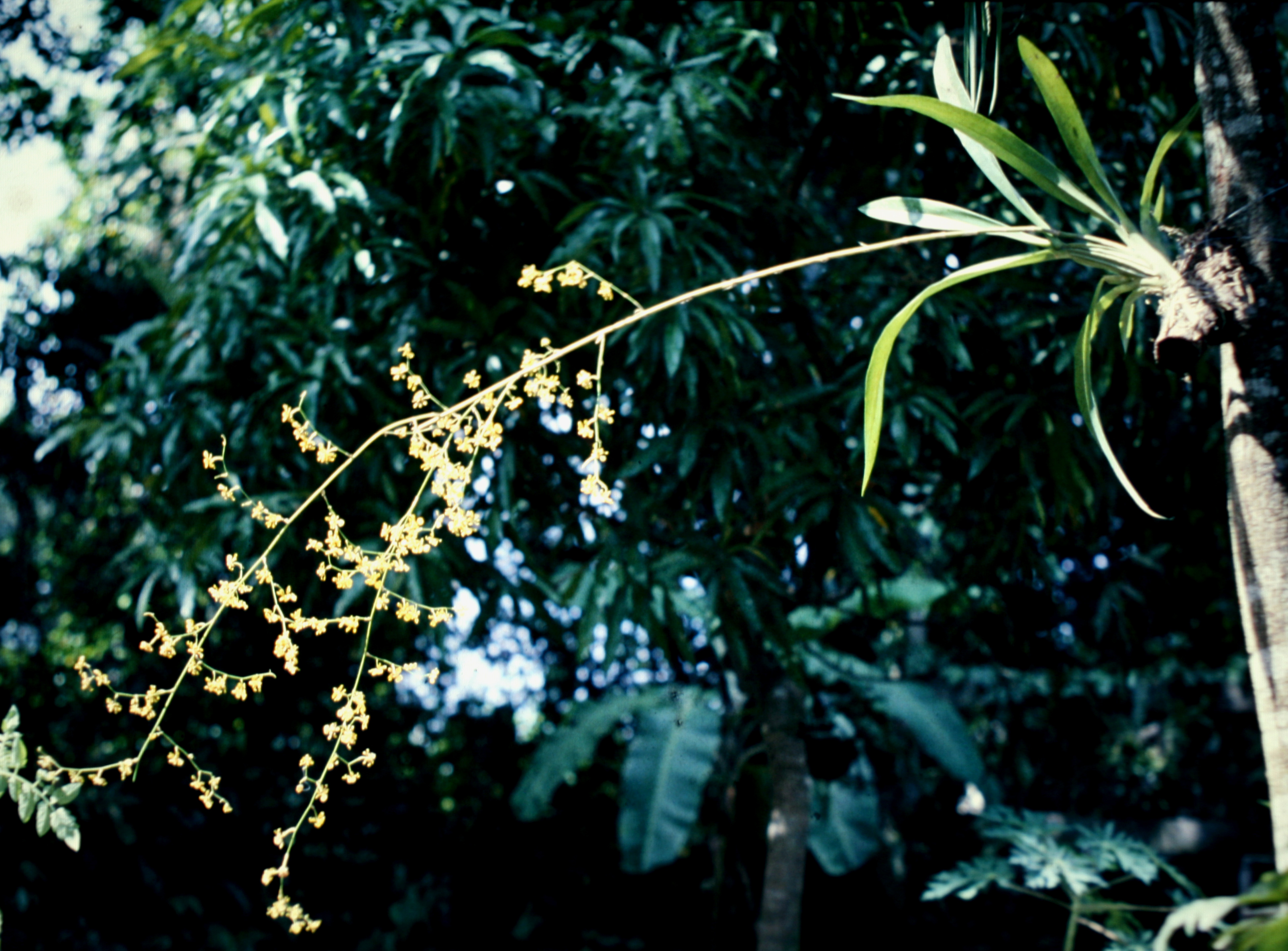

Scientific classification
- Kingdom: Plantae
- Clade: Tracheophytes
- Clade: Angiosperms
- Clade: Monocots
- Order: Asparagales
- Family: Orchidaceae
- Subfamily: Epidendroideae
- Genus: Oncidium
- Species: O. baueri

Binomial name
- Oncidium baueri Lindl.

Synonyms
- Epidendrum floridum Vell.; Oncidium altissimum Lindl. 1833, illegitimate homonym, not (Jacq.) Sw. 1800; Oncidium kappleri Rchb.f. ex Lindl.; Oncidium pentecostale Rchb.f.; Oncidium peliogramma Linden & Rchb.f.; Oncidium hebraicum Rchb.f.; Oncidium wydleri Rchb.f.; Oncidium bolivianum Schltr.; Oncidium bicameratum Rchb.f. ex Kraenzl.; Oncidium altissimum var. baueri (Lindl.) Stein; Oncidium advena Rchb.f.; Oncidium platyglossum Rchb.f. ex Linden; Oncidium schmidtianum Rchb.f.; Oncidium buchtienii Schltr.; Oncidium multiflorum Soysa; Vitekorchis buchtienii (Schltr.) Romowicz & Szlach.

= Oncidium baueri =

Species of orchid

Oncidium baueri is a species of orchid native to Costa Rica and to South America as far south as Bolivia and Brazil.
