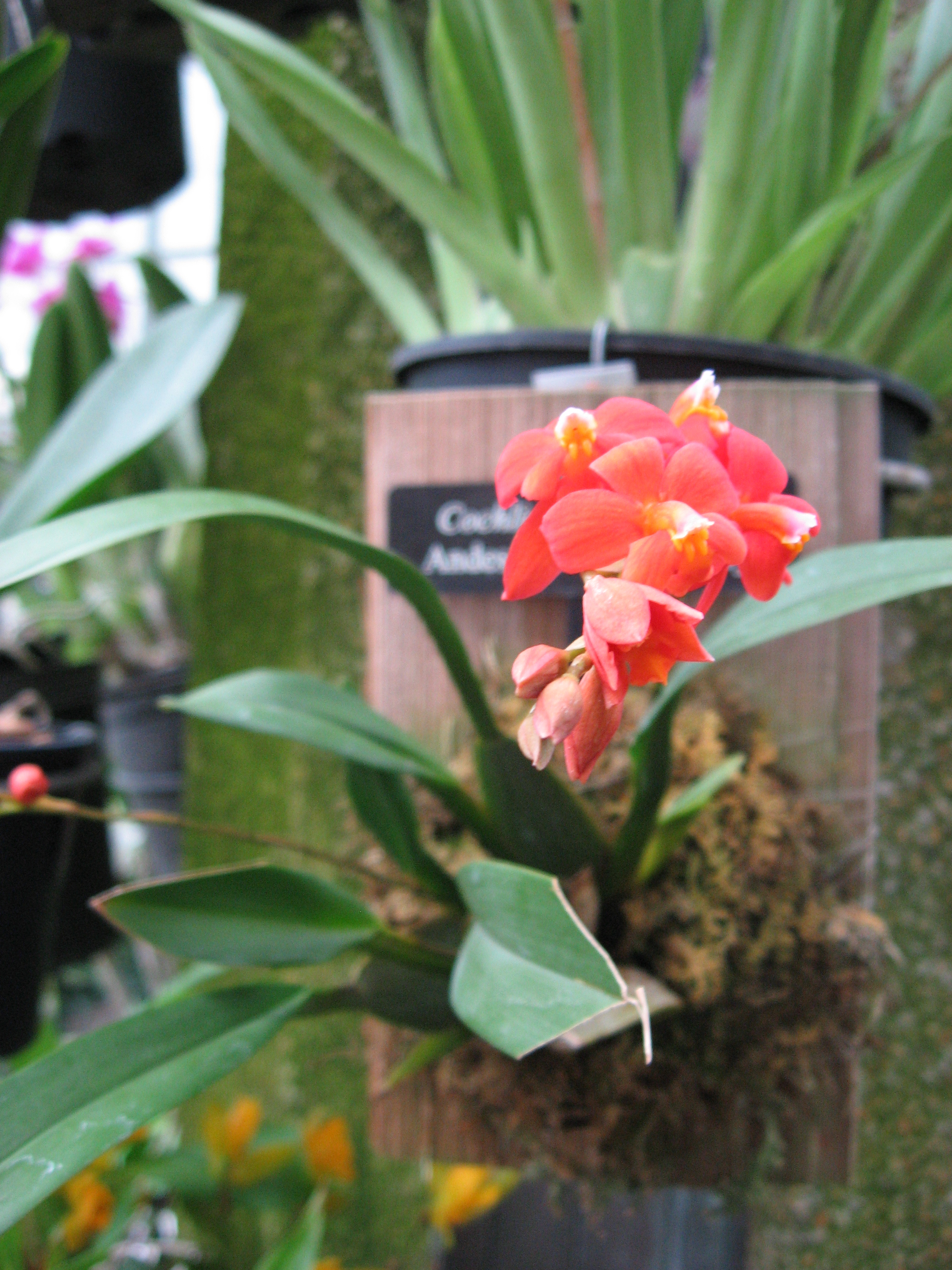

Scientific classification
- Kingdom: Plantae
- Clade: Tracheophytes
- Clade: Angiosperms
- Clade: Monocots
- Order: Asparagales
- Family: Orchidaceae
- Subfamily: Epidendroideae
- Genus: Oncidium
- Species: O. noezlianum

Binomial name
- Oncidium noezlianum (Mast.) M.W.Chase & N.H.Williams

Synonyms
- Homotypic Synonyms: Cochlioda noezliana (Mast.) Rolfe; Odontoglossum noezlianum Mast.; Heterotypic Synonyms: Cochlioda beyrodtiana Schltr.; Cochlioda densiflora Lindl.; Cochlioda densiflora f. aurea Roeth & O.Gruss; Cochlioda floryi Rolfe; Cochlioda miniata L.Linden; Cochlioda noezliana var. superba L.Linden; Mesospinidium densiflorum (Lindl.) Rchb.f.; Odontoglossum cochlioda Rchb.f.; Odontoglossum noezlianum f. aureum (Roeth & O.Gruss) O.Gruss & Schettler; Oncidium andinum Molinari; Oncidium beyrodtioides M.W.Chase & N.H.Williams; Oncidium densiflorum (Lindl.) M.W.Chase & N.H.Williams; Oncidium floryi (Rolfe) M.W.Chase & N.H.Williams; Oncidium miniatum (L.Linden) M.W.Chase & N.H.Williams

= Oncidium noezlianum =

Species of orchid

Oncidium noezlianum is a species of plant in the family Orchidaceae.
