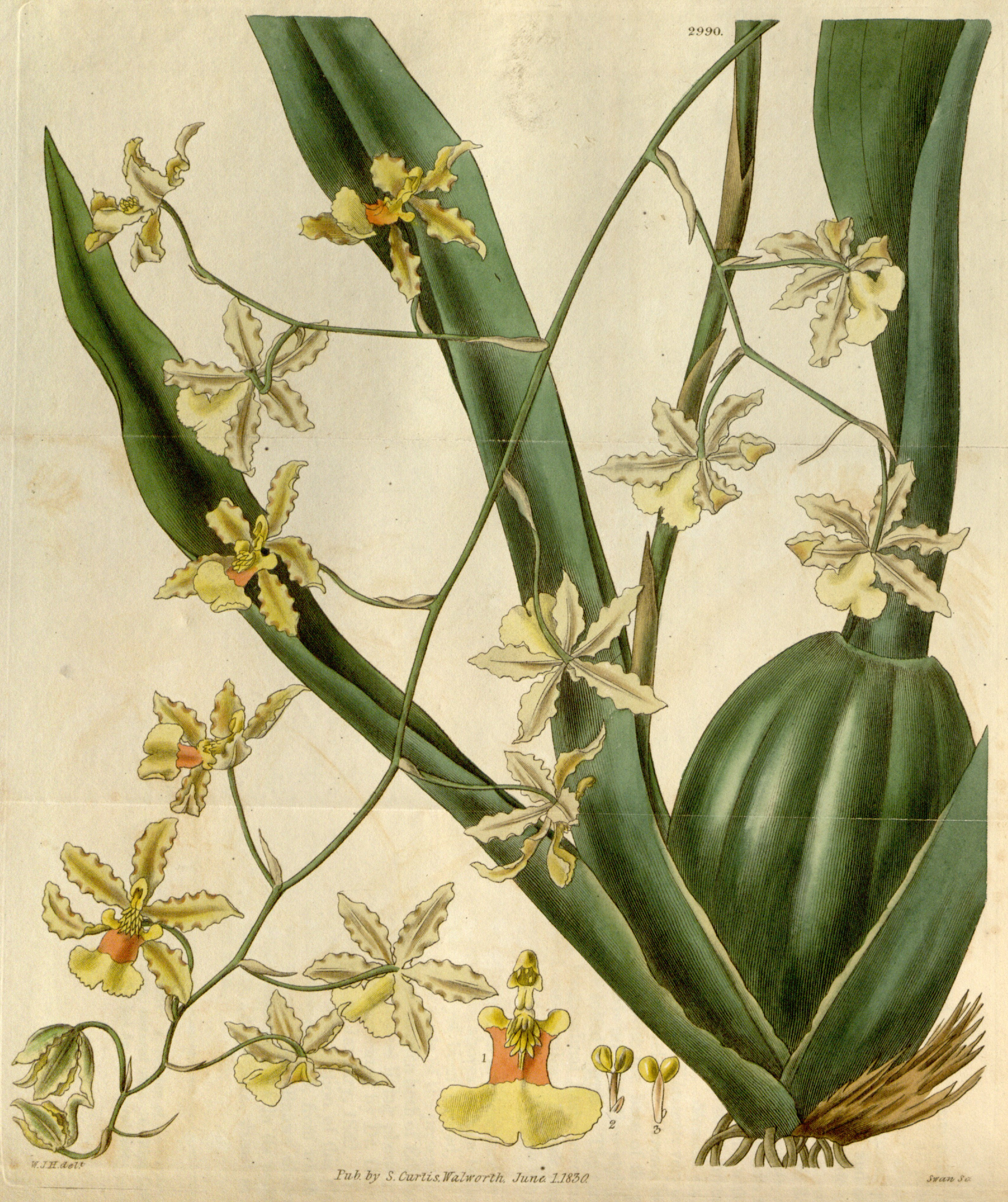
- Oncidium altissimum

Scientific classification
- Kingdom: Plantae
- Clade: Tracheophytes
- Clade: Angiosperms
- Clade: Monocots
- Order: Asparagales
- Family: Orchidaceae
- Subfamily: Epidendroideae
- Tribe: Cymbidieae
- Subtribe: Oncidiinae
- Genus: Oncidium; Sw.

Type species
- Oncidium altissimum (Jacq.) Sw.

Synonyms
- Anachaste Lindl.; Chamaeleorchis Senghas & Lückel; Cochlioda Lindl.; Collare-stuartense Senghas & Bockemühl; Heteranthocidium Szlach., Mytnik & Romowicz; Matalbatzia Archila, the word "Type" or equivalent not used.; Mexicoa Garay; Miltoniastrum (Rchb.f.) Lindl.; Miltonioides Brieger & Lückel; Odontoglossum Kunth; Petalocentrum Schltr.; Roezliella Schltr.; Sigmatostalix Rchb.f.; Solenidiopsis Senghas; Symphyglossum Schltr., nom. cons.; Xeilyathum Raf.

= Oncidium =

Genus of orchids

Oncidium is a genus of about 370 species of orchid in the family Orchidaceae. It is distributed across tropical and subtropical America from Mexico, Central America and the West Indies to northern Argentina, with one species (O. ensatum) extending into Florida. Common names for plants in this genus include dancing-lady orchid.

A molecular phylogenetic study published in 2009 labeled the Oncidium alliance "grossly polyphyletic." In the same year, the American Orchid Society labeled the genus a "dumping ground". A consensus announced in April 2013 resulted in major taxonomic changes to Oncidium, Gomesa, Odontoglossum, Miltonia, and others. Much of this debate and subsequent housekeeping was initiated by significant research for the scientific publication Genera Orchidacearum Volume 5. One significant change is the move of most Brazilian Oncidium with a fused lateral sepal to the genus Gomesa.

== Description ==
Oncidium Hilo Firecracker "New Year"

Orchids in the genus Oncidium are tufted, epiphytic, lithophytic or terrestrial herbs with clustered pseudobulbs each with up to four blunt-tipped, strap-like leaves. The inflorescences are borne in panicles, usually appear from the axils of recently matured growth and flower only once from the pseudobulb. The flowers are resupinate, the sepals and petals free from each other, egg-shaped to nearly circular, with a fiddle-shaped lip with a prominent warty fringe. The fruit is a capsule.

== Taxonomy ==
The genus Oncidium was first described in 1800 by Olof Swartz in Kungliga Svenska Vetenskapsakademiens Handlingar (Proceedings of the Royal Swedish Academy of Sciences) The genus name Oncidium is derived from the Greek word ὀγκος, onkos, meaning 'swelling' and the diminutive -idium in reference to the prominent lip callus.

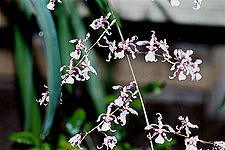
Oncidium incurvum - another view

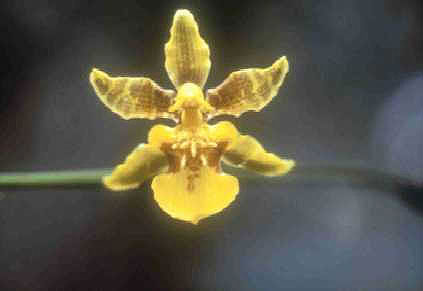
Florida orchid (Oncidium ensatum)

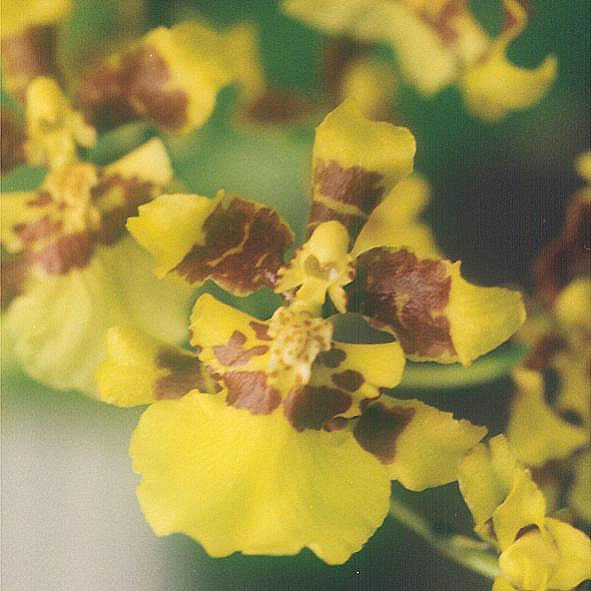
Oncidium sphacelatum

== Selected species ==
Selected species accepted by Plants of the World Online as of December 2023:

- Oncidium altissimum : "Wydler's dancing-lady orchid" (Jamaica)
- Oncidium baueri (Trop. America)
- Oncidium cheirophorum (Mexico - Chiapas to Colombia)
- Oncidium citrinum (Trinidad to Venezuela)
- Oncidium deltoideum (N. Peru)
- Oncidium dichromaticum (Costa Rica to Colombia)
- Oncidium ensatum : (S. Mexico, Belize, Cuba, Florida, Bahamas, NW. Venezuela)
- Oncidium fuscatum (Ecuador to Peru)
- Oncidium geertianum (C. & SW. Mexico)
- Oncidium graminifolium (Mexico to C. America)
- Oncidium harryanum (Colombia)
- Oncidium hastatum (Mexico)
- Oncidium hastilabium (W. South America)
- Oncidium incurvum (Mexico - Veracruz to Chiapas)
- Oncidium lentiginosum (Colombia to N. Venezuela)
- Oncidium leucochilum (SE. Mexico to Guatemala)
- Oncidium lineoligerum (N. Peru)
- Oncidium maculatum (Mexico to C. America)
- Oncidium naevium (Colombia to Guyana)
- Oncidium noezlianum (N. Peru to Bolivia)
- Oncidium ornithorhynchum (Mexico to C. America)
- Oncidium reflexum (SW. Mexico)
- Oncidium sphacelatum (Mexico to C. America, SE. Venezuela)
- Oncidium strictum (Cogn.) M.W.Chase & N.H.Williams (Ecuador, Peru)
- Oncidium wentworthianum (Mexico – Chiapas to El Salvador)

Floral Morphology of an Oncidium Orchid This composite image presents a detailed botanical illustration of the floral anatomy of a typical Oncidium orchid, commonly known as dancing-lady orchid.

== Nothogenera ==
Many hybrids have been created artificially involving species of Oncidium, often with species of other genera. Named hybrid genera (nothogenera) are listed in the table below, together with their parent genera. As of December 2023, Cochlioda and Odontoglossum are included within Oncidium. and Baptistonia within Gomesa,

Nothogenera involving Oncidium
Nothogenus	Parents
× Adacidium	Ada × Oncidium
× Adoncostele	Ada × Oncidium × Rhynchostele
× Aliceara	Brassia × Miltonia × Oncidium
× Arthurara	Brassia × Miltonia × Oncidium × Rhynchostele
× Aspacidopsis	Aspasia × Miltoniopsis × Oncidium
× Aspacidostele	Aspasia × Oncidium × Rhynchostele
× Aspasium	Aspasia × Oncidium
× Brapacidium	Aspasia × Brassia × Oncidium
× Brascidostele	Brassia × Oncidium × Rhynchostele
× Brassidiocentrum	Brassia × Oncidium × Trichocentrum
× Brassidium	Brassia × Oncidium
× Brassidomesa	Brassia × Gomesa × Oncidium
× Brassoncidopsis	Brassia × Miltoniopsis × Oncidium
× Crawshayara	Aspasia × Brassia × Miltonia × Oncidium
× Cuitlacidium	Cuitlauzina × Oncidium
× Cyrtocidistele	Cyrtochilum × Oncidium × Rhynchostele
× Cyrtocidium	Cyrtochilum × Oncidium
× Cyrtoncidopsis	Cyrtochilum × Miltoniopsis × Oncidium
× Dunningara	Aspasia × Miltonia × Oncidium
× Gomiltidium	Gomesa × Miltonia × Oncidium
× Gomonciada	Ada × Gomesa × Oncidium
× Gomoncidochilum	Cyrtochilum × Gomesa × Oncidium
× Howeara	Leochilus × Oncidium × Rodriguezia
× Lockcidium	Lockhartia × Oncidium
× Milenkocidium	Miltonia × Oncidium × Zelenkoa
× Milmilcidium	Miltonia × Miltoniopsis × Oncidium
× Milonzina	Cuitlauzina × Miltonia × Oncidium
× Miltadium	Ada × Miltonia × Oncidium
× Miltoncentrum	Miltonia × Oncidium × Trichocentrum
× Miltoncidostele	Miltonia × Oncidium × Rhynchostele
× Miltonidium	Miltonia × Oncidium
× Oncidesa	Gomesa × Oncidium
× Oncidettia	Comparettia × Oncidium
× Oncidopsis	Miltoniopsis × Oncidium
× Oncidpilia	Oncidium × Trichopilia
× Oncidumnia	Oncidium × Tolumnia
× Oncostele	Oncidium × Rhynchostele
× Oncostelopsis	Miltoniopsis × Oncidium × Rhynchostele
× Otorhynchocidium	Oncidium × Otoglossum × Rhynchostele
× Pettitara	Ada × Brassia × Oncidium
× Psychocidium	Oncidium × Psychopsis
× Reicheara	Aspasia × Miltonia × Miltoniopsis × Oncidium
× Rodricidium	Oncidium × Rodriguezia
× Scelodium	Oncidium × Scelochilus
× Schunkeara	Brassia × Miltonia × Miltoniopsis × Oncidium
× Trichocidium	Oncidium × Trichocentrum
× Warneara	Comparettia × Oncidium × Rodriguezia
× Zelencidiostele	Oncidium × Rhynchostele × Zelenkoa
× Zelencidopsis	Miltoniopsis × Oncidium × Zelenkoa
× Zelenkocidium	Oncidium × Zelenkoa

== Former nothogenera ==
Some nothogenera have been named based on hybrids involving Cochlioda or Odontoglossum, both accepted as synonyms of Oncidium as of April 2026, so that hybrids formerly placed in these nothogenera now fall within Oncidium. Such nothogenera include:

- × Odontioda for Cochlioda × Odontoglossum hybrids
- × Odontocidium for Odontoglossum × Oncidium hybrids
- × Wilsonara for Cochlioda × Odontoglossum × Oncidium hybrids
