= G. crispa =

G. crispa may refer to:

- Gastrococos crispa, a palm species
- Gomesa crispa, an orchid species in the genus Gomesa
- Guarea crispa, a plant species endemic to Brazil

== See also ==
- Crispa (disambiguation)
