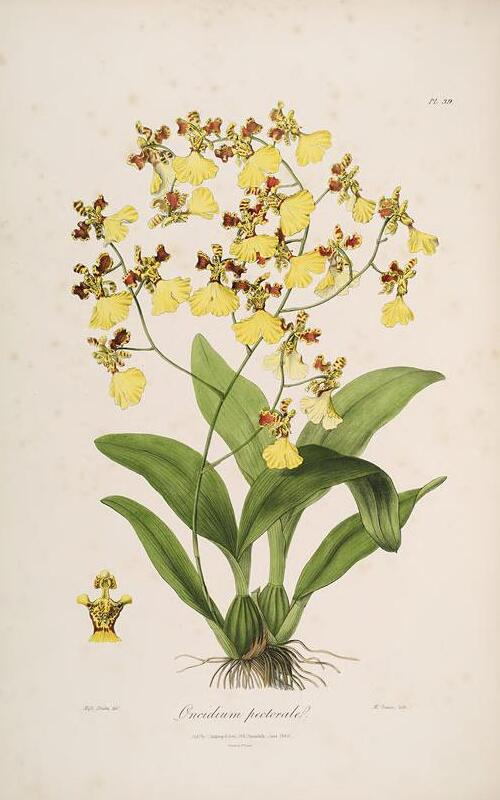

Scientific classification
- Kingdom: Plantae
- Clade: Tracheophytes
- Clade: Angiosperms
- Clade: Monocots
- Order: Asparagales
- Family: Orchidaceae
- Subfamily: Epidendroideae
- Genus: Oncidium
- Species: O. pectorale

Binomial name
- Oncidium pectorale Lindl.

Synonyms
- Oncidium mantinii God.-Leb.; Oncidium pectorale var. mantinii (God.-Leb.) Cogn.; Brasilidium pectorale (Lindl.) Campacci

= Oncidium pectorale =

Species of orchid

Oncidium pectorale is a species of orchid endemic to Brazil (Rio de Janeiro). It is a synonym of Gomesa gardneri.
