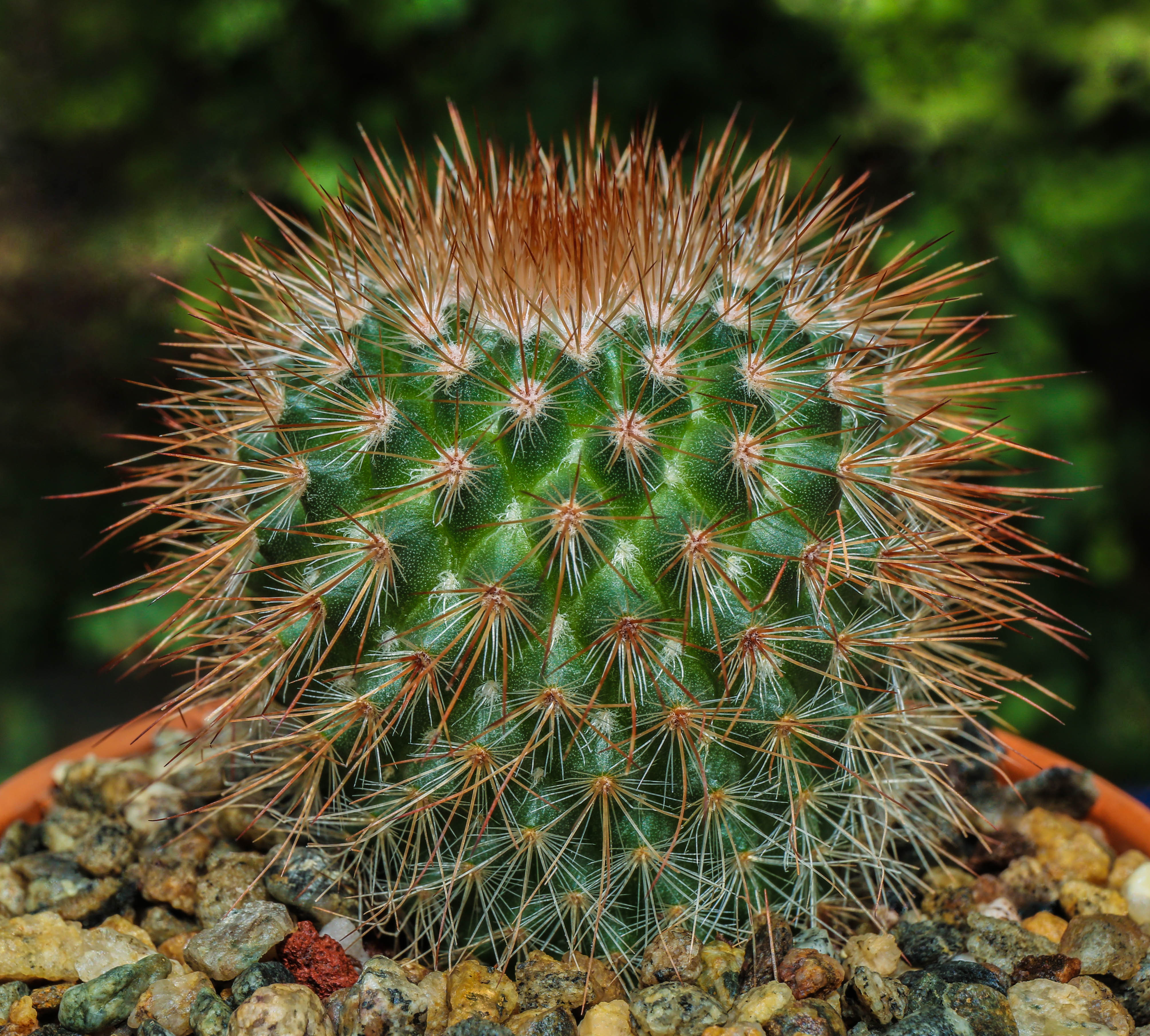
- M. spinosissima var. 'rubrispina' ('Super Red')

Scientific classification
- Kingdom: Plantae
- Clade: Tracheophytes
- Clade: Angiosperms
- Clade: Eudicots
- Order: Caryophyllales
- Family: Cactaceae
- Subfamily: Cactoideae
- Genus: Mammillaria
- Species: M. spinosissima

Binomial name
- Mammillaria spinosissima (Kuntze) Lem.

Synonyms
- Many, including: Mammillaria auricoma; Mammillaria centraliplumosa; Mammillaria crassior; Mammillaria gasterantha; Mammillaria haasii; Mammillaria pilcayensis; Mammillaria virginis

= Mammillaria spinosissima =

Species of cactus from Mexico

Mammillaria spinosissima (/ˌmæmɪˈlɛəriə ˌspɪnoʊˈsɪsɪmə/), also known as the spiny pincushion cactus, is a species of flowering plant in the cactus family Cactaceae, endemic to the central Mexican states of Guerrero and Morelos, where they grow at elevations of approximately 1,600 to 1,900 metres (5,200 to 6,200 ft). The species was described in 1838 by James Forbes, gardener of the Duke of Bedford. Botanist David Hunt collected a specimen in 1971, when he located one near Sierra de Tepoztlan, Mexico.

M. spinosissima thrive in well-drained soils that are sandy or loam, with a pH ranging from acidic to neutral. They prefer low humidity and full, filtered sun. Plants are typically watered once every two or three weeks, and kept nearly dry during the winter months. They require no pruning and make good patio and container plants. They are relatively disease resistant, but susceptible to pests such as mealybugs. Synonyms of M. spinosissima include Mammillaria centraliplumosa, Mammillaria haasii, and Mammillaria virginis.

== Taxonomy ==
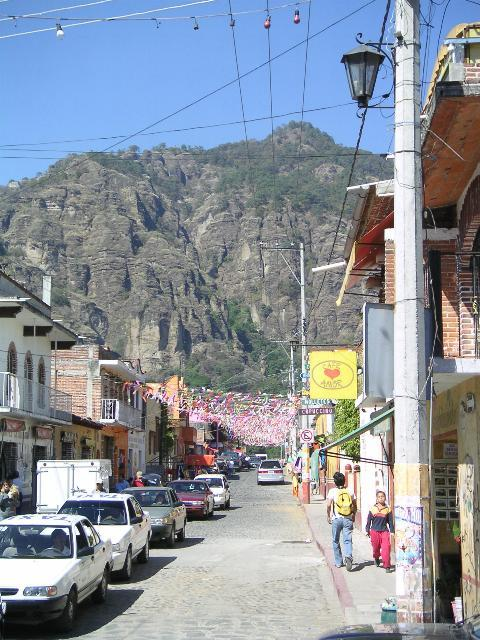
Sierra de Tepoztlan

Carl Linnaeus designated Mammillaria as a type genus for cactus in 1753. In 1838, James Forbes, gardener of the Duke of Bedford, listed and described a species he called Echinocactus spinosissimas from a group of cacti he had acquired in Europe three years earlier. Nathaniel Lord Britton and Joseph Nelson Rose believe that Forbes was given that name by Ludwig Karl Georg Pfeiffer, but the plant was actually Mammillaria spinosissima.

Pfeiffer had published the first infrageneric division of Mammillaria in 1837, dividing the genus into two groups based on distinct spine characteristics. In 1845, Joseph zu Salm-Reifferscheidt-Dyck – based on work by Frederick Scheer – expanded the classification into eight groups. With at least 145 recognized species, it is one of the largest and most morphologically variable genera in the cactus family. Others estimate there are as many as two hundred species of Mammillaria, including sixty-two cultivated species from India. Though larger, the genus Opuntia is less popular with gardeners and landscapers. Mammillaria was previously thought to be monophyletic, but phylogenic analysis indicates that Mammilloydia is "embedded within a 'core' group of Mammillaria species." A specimen of Mammillaria spinosissima was collected by Botanist David Hunt in September 1971, when he located one in Mexico, near the Morelos Cautla-Cuernavaca toll road in Sierra de Tepoztlan, at an altitude of 1,600 meters (5,200 ft).

=== Similar species, subspecies and synonyms ===
Species similar to Mammillaria spinosissima include Mammillaria backebergiana and Mammillaria meyranii. Subspecies include M. spinosissima pilcayensis, synonym: Bravo (D. R. Hunt), M. spinosissima tepoxtlana (D. R. Hunt), and M. spinosissima spinosissima (Lem.). Synonyms of M. spinosissima include Mammillaria centraliplumosa (Fittkau), Mammillaria haasii (J. Meyrán), and Mammillaria virginis (Fittkau and Kladiwa).

== Description ==
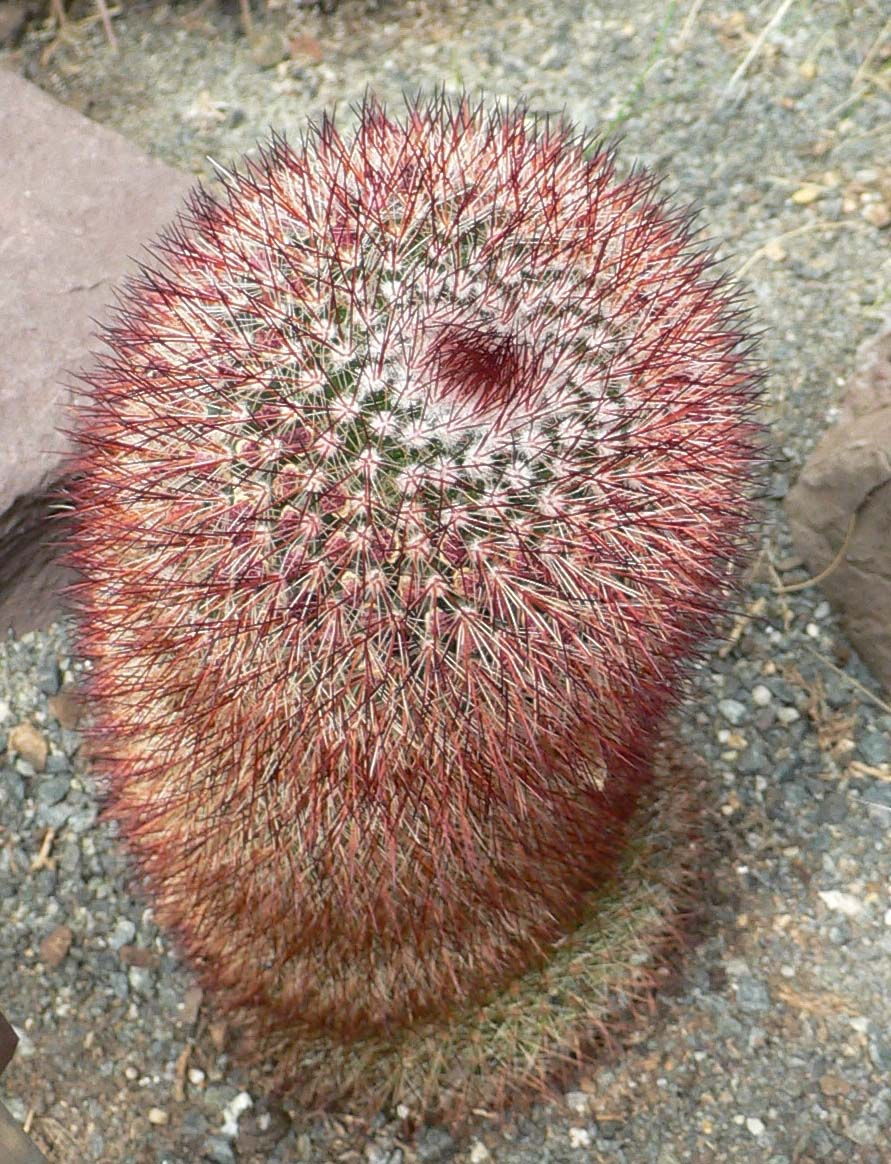
In the United States Botanic Garden

Mammillaria spinosissima, also known as spiny pincushion cactus, are cylindrical plants that grow up to 30 centimetres (12 in) tall and 10 centimetres (3.9 in) wide. They reach full height after five to ten years. The spines are red-brown or white, with cream-colored radials and pink, funnel-shaped flowers that grow in a ring around the apex of the stem to approximately 2 centimetres (0.79 in) long. The relatively small cacti are globular or elongated, and the flowers produce generally bright red berries that are club-shaped, smooth, and juicy.

Mammillaria species tend to grow low to the ground in solitary or grouped in clusters. The genus is marked by its dimorphic areoles: the spine bearing, or vegetative, areoles are located on the apex of the tubercle, and flowering areoles are located inside the axils of the tubercles. The stem is woolly and covered with bristles.

== Native habitat ==
The genus Mammillaria's native habitat ranges from Colombia and Venezuela to the Southwestern United States. Its diversity is greatest in Mexico. Species have also been documented in the West Indies. M. spinosissima is endemic to central Mexico and concentrated in the states of Guerrero and Morelos, where they grow at elevations of approximately 1,600 to 1,900 meters (5,200 to 6,200 ft); they prefer dry, tropical forests and xerophilous scrub. The subspecies pilcayensis is named for its occurrence in the Barranca de Pilcaya, in Guerrero.

== Cultivation ==
Britton and Rose believe that M. spinosissima has been in cultivation since at least 1835. The species thrives in well-drained soils that are sandy or loam, with a pH that is acidic, alkaline, or neutral. They prefer low humidity, and grow well under glass, with full, filtered sun from the south, north, and east. Plants are typically watered once every couple of weeks, and kept nearly dry during the winter months. Propagation is by offsets or by seeds sown in early spring in 19 to 24 °C (34 to 43 °F) weather. They require no pruning and make good patio and container plants. They are disease resistant, but are susceptible to pests such as mealybugs. This plant has gained the Royal Horticultural Society's Award of Garden Merit.

== Gallery ==
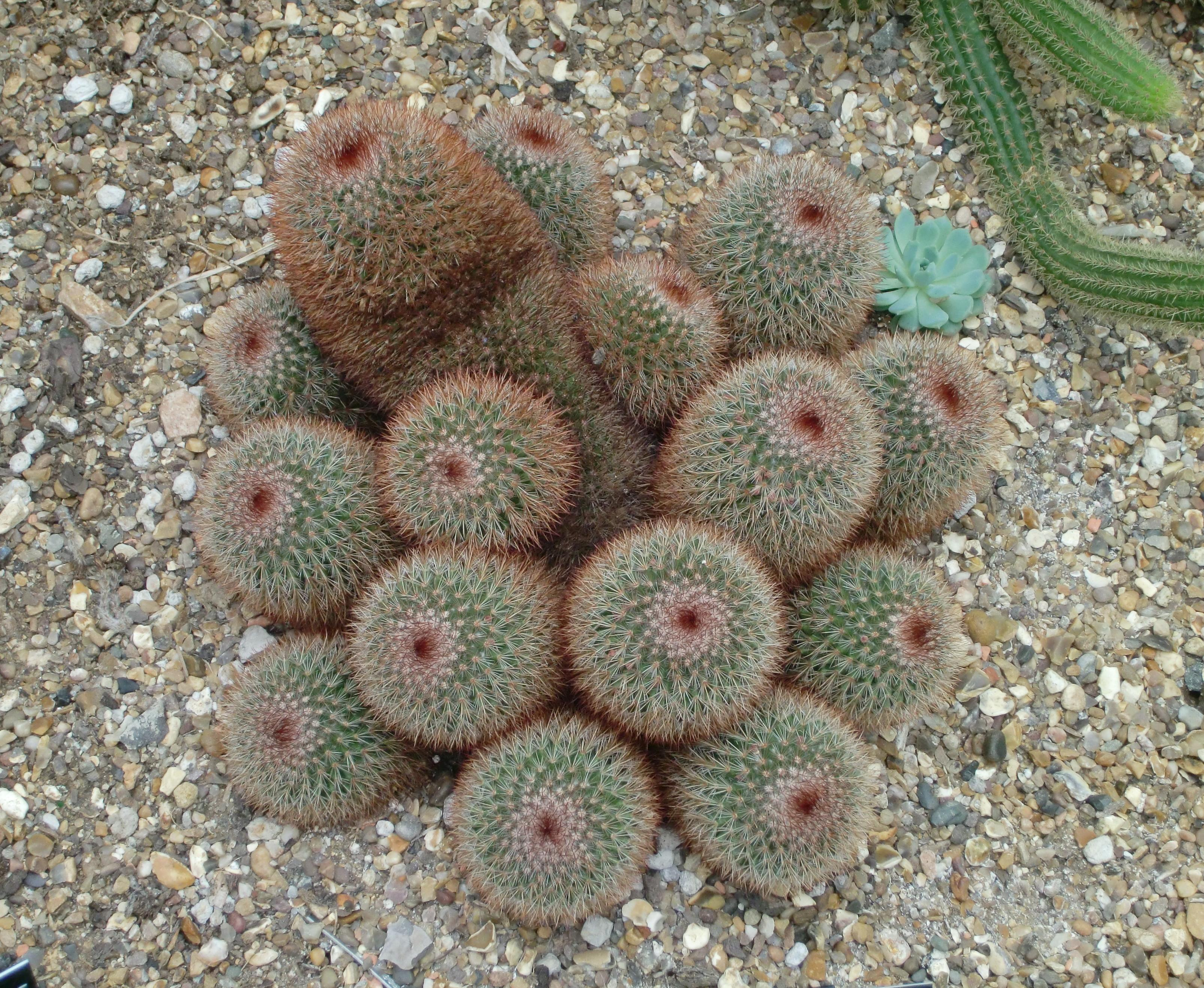
In a cluster, Kew Gardens, London

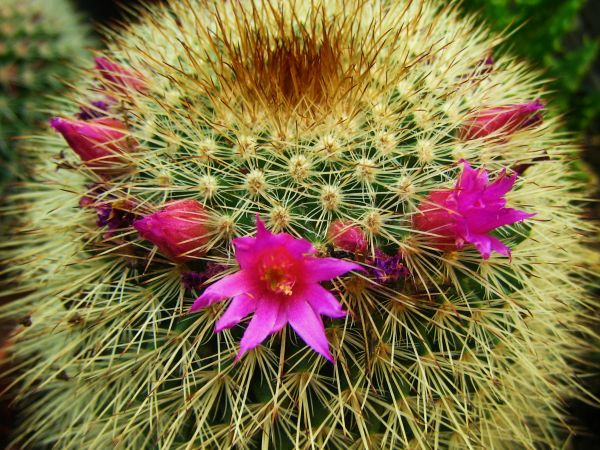
Flowers

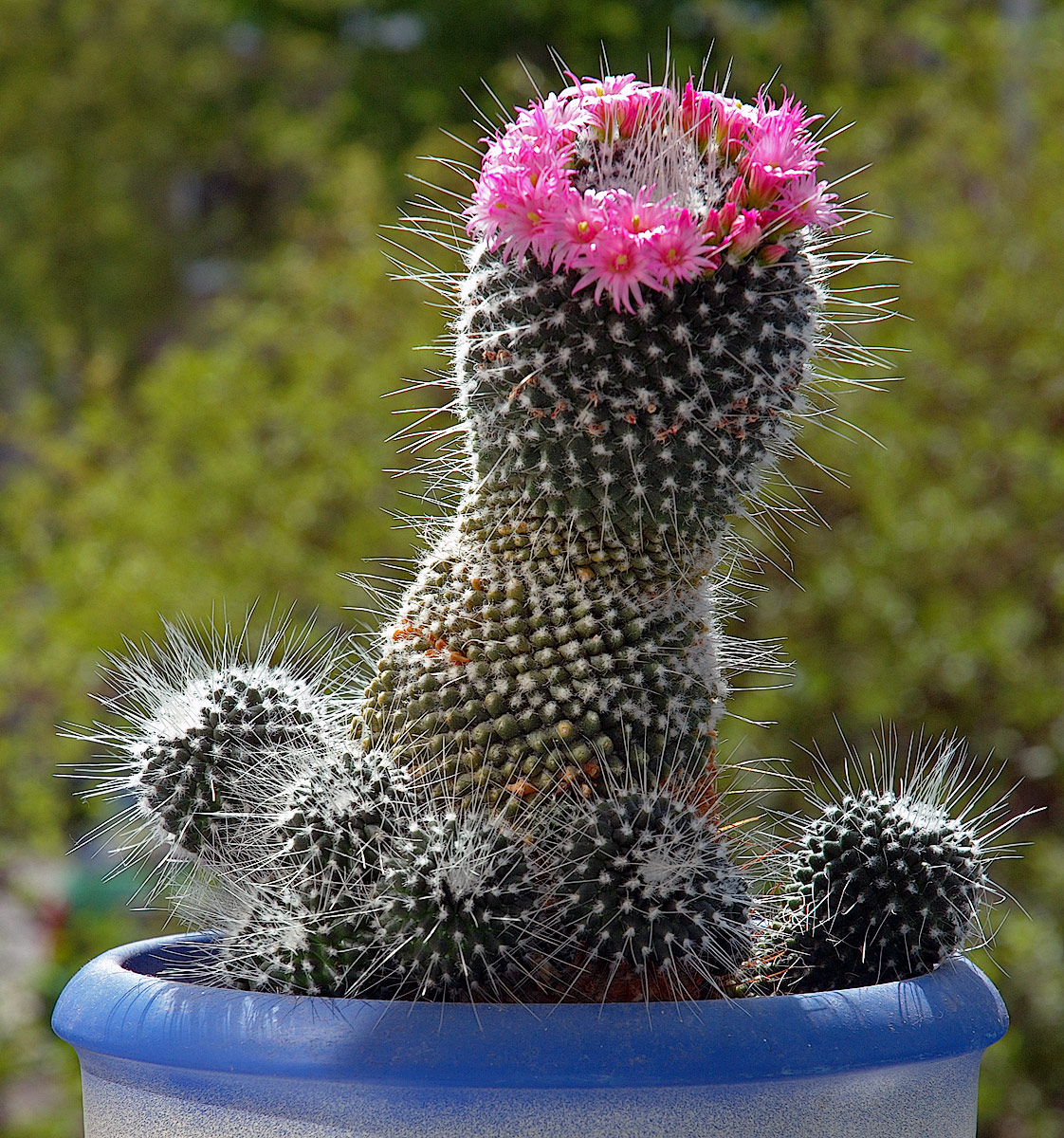
M. spinosissima cv. 'un pico'

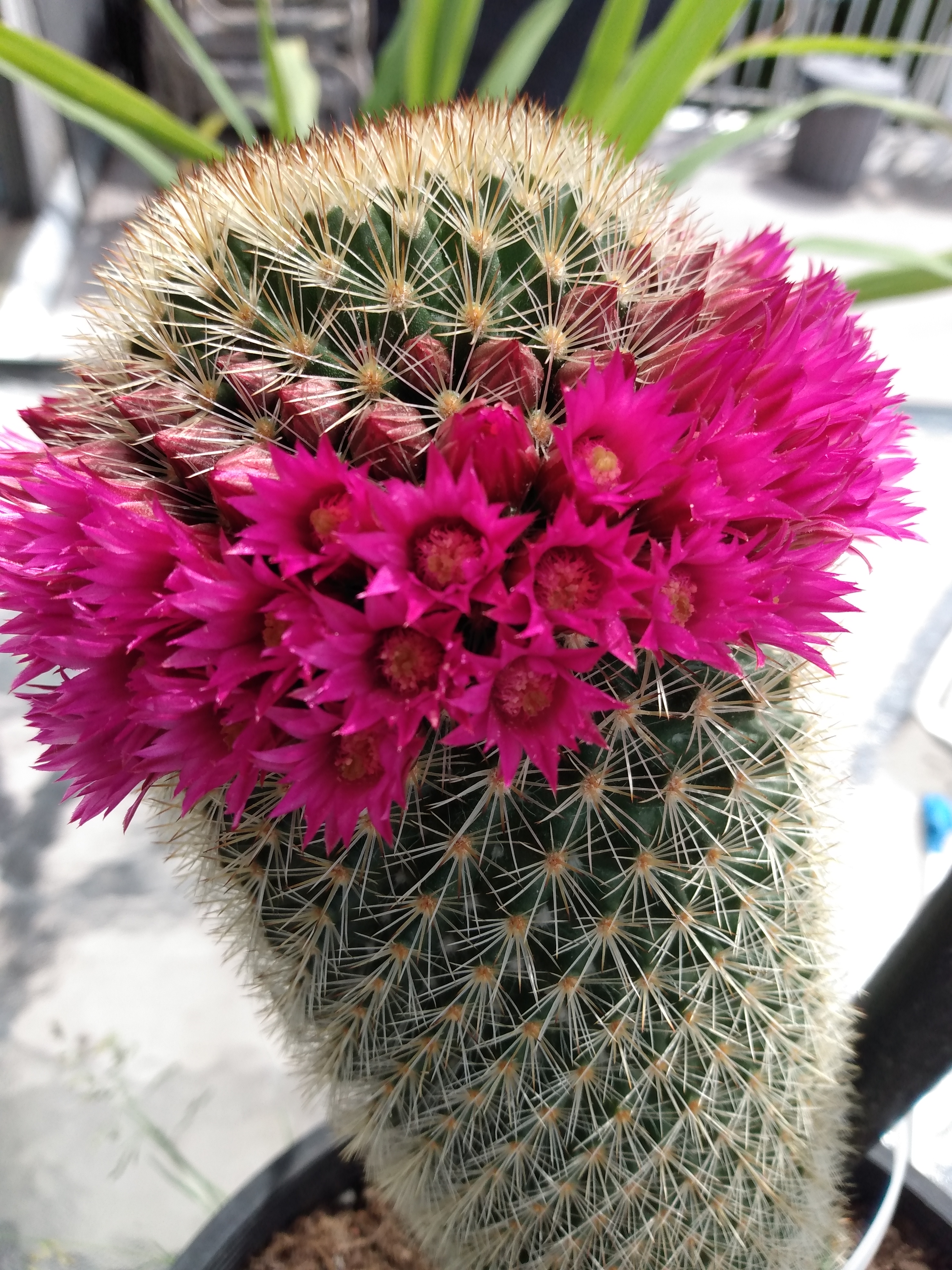
in bloom

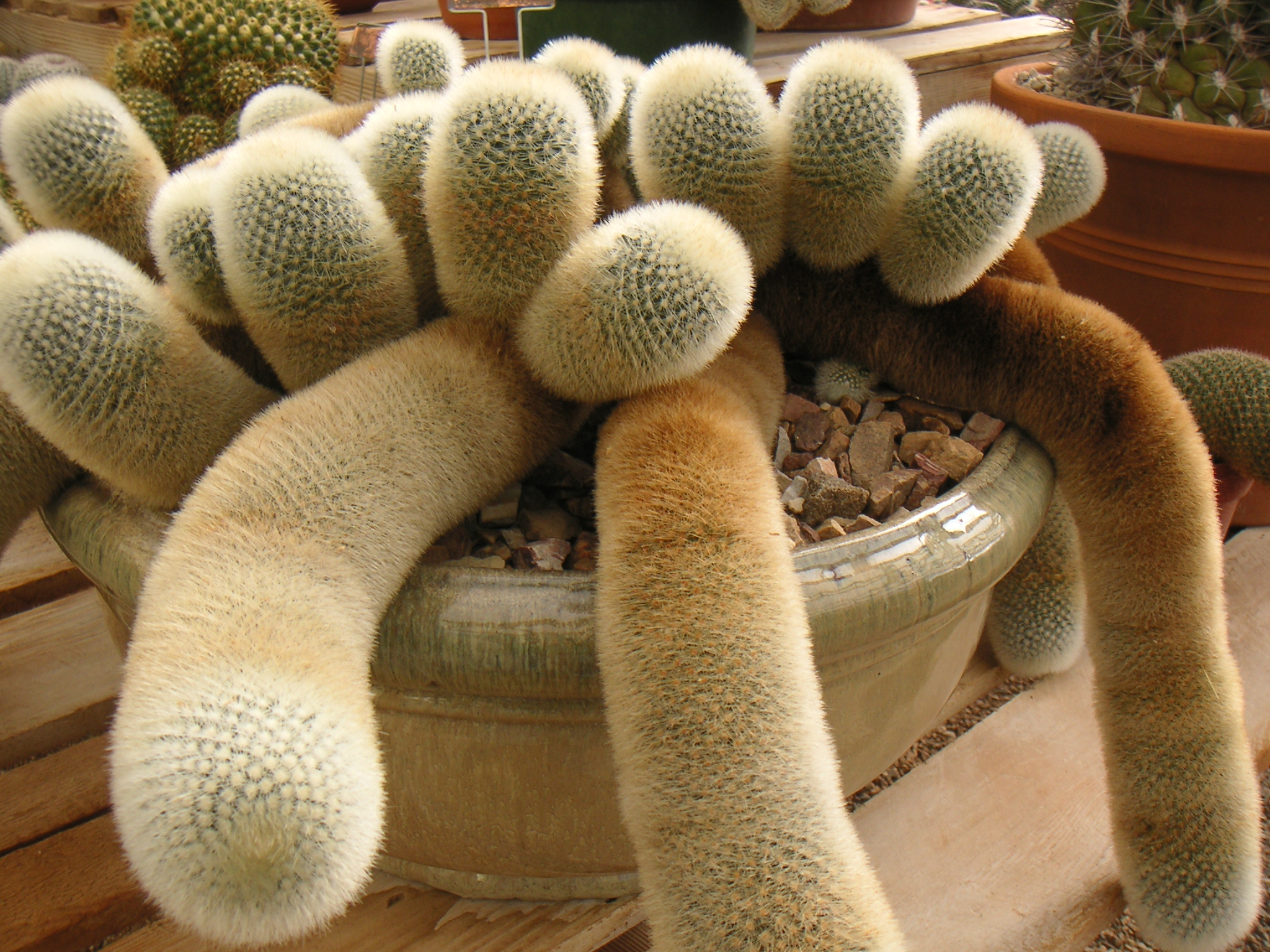
M. spinosissima subsp. pilcayensis

== Notes ==
Bibliography

- Britton, Nathaniel Lord; Rose, Joseph Nelson (1922), The Cactaceae: Descriptions and Illustrations of Plants of the Cactus Family, vol. 3, Carnegie Institution of Washington
- Butterworth, Charles A.; Wallace, Robert S. (2004), "Phylogenetic studies of Mammillaria (Cactaceae)—insights from chloroplast sequence variation and hypothesis testing using the parametric bootstrap", American Journal of Botany, 91 (7): 1086–1098, doi:10.3732/ajb.91.7.1086, PMID 21653464
- Eggli, Urs; Newton, Leonard E. (2004), Etymological Dictionary of Succulent Plant Names, Springer Science and Business Media, ISBN 978-3-540-00489-9
- Graham, Charles (2014), Cacti and Succulents: An Illustrated Guide to the Plants and Their Cultivation, Crowood, ISBN 978-1-84797-786-1
- "Mammillaria spinosissima", Integrated Taxonomic Information System, United States Government
- "Mammillaria spinosissima ssp. spinosissima", Integrated Taxonomic Information System, United States Government
- The IUCN List of Threatened Species, International Union for Conservation of Nature and Natural Resources
- Herbarium catalogue: Mammillaria spinosissima, Kew Gardens
- Mattagajasingh, Ilwola; Mukherjee, Arup Kumar; Das, Premananda (2006), "Genomic relations among 31 species of Mammillaria Haworth (Cactaceae) using random amplified polymorphic DNA" (PDF), Zeitschrift für Naturforschung, vol. 61C, no. 7–8, pp. 583–591
- Mammillaria spinosissima: Spiny Pincushion Cactus, Royal Horticultural Society
- Pienaar, Kristo (2000), The South African What Flower is That? (Illustrated ed.), Struik, ISBN 978-1-86872-441-3
