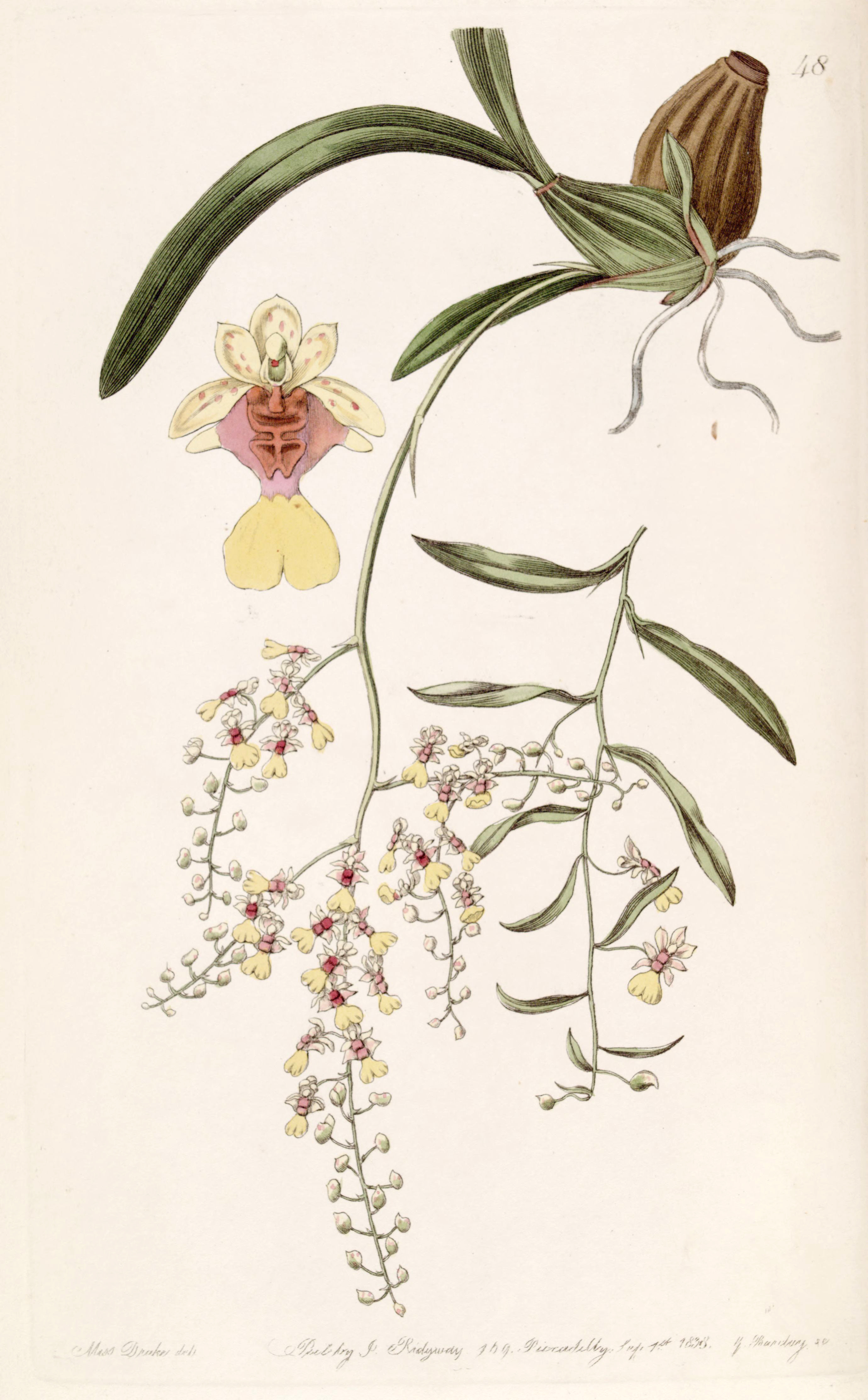

Scientific classification
- Kingdom: Plantae
- Clade: Tracheophytes
- Clade: Angiosperms
- Clade: Monocots
- Order: Asparagales
- Family: Orchidaceae
- Subfamily: Epidendroideae
- Genus: Gomesa
- Species: G. ranifera

Binomial name
- Gomesa ranifera (Lindl.) M.W.Chase & N.H.Williams

Synonyms
- Oncidium raniferum Lindl.; Oncidium raniferum var. majus Hook.; Carenidium raniferum (Lindl.) Baptista; Menezesiella ranifera (Lindl.)

= Gomesa ranifera =

Species of orchid

Gomesa ranifera is a species of orchid endemic to eastern Brazil.
