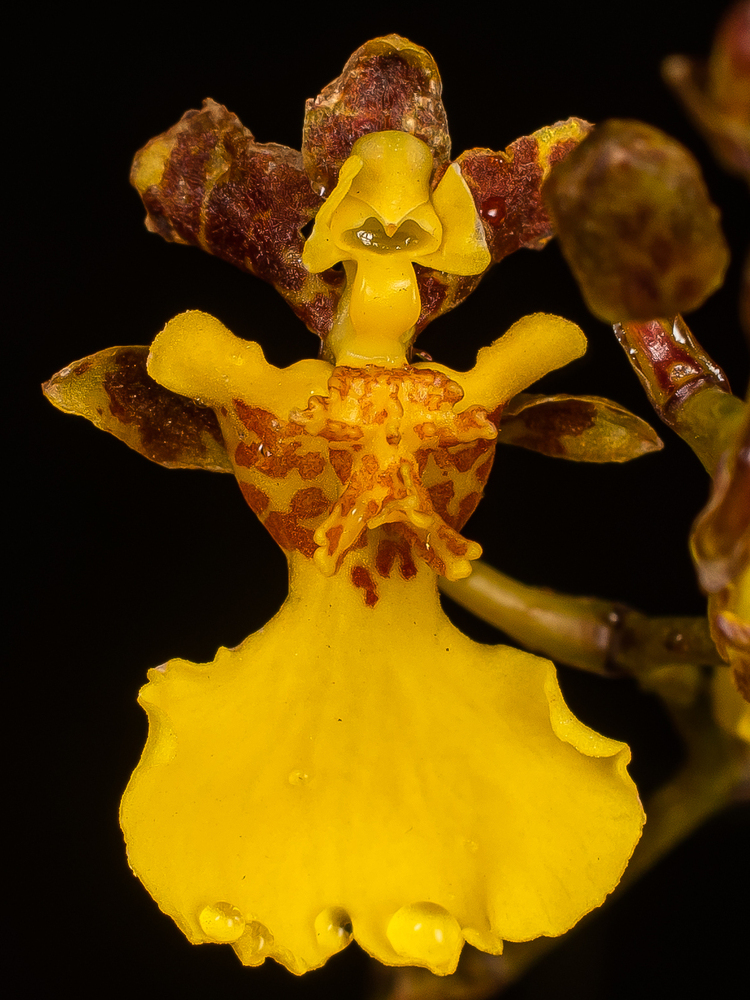

Scientific classification
- Kingdom: Plantae
- Clade: Tracheophytes
- Clade: Angiosperms
- Clade: Monocots
- Order: Asparagales
- Family: Orchidaceae
- Subfamily: Epidendroideae
- Genus: Gomesa
- Species: G. hydrophila

Binomial name
- Gomesa hydrophila (Barb.Rodr.) M.W.Chase & N.H.Williams

Synonyms
- Ampliglossum hydrophilum (Barb.Rodr.) Campacci; Coppensia hydrophila (Barb.Rodr.) Campacci; Oncidium hydrophilum Barb.Rodr.; Oncidium hydrophilum f. immaculatum (L.C.Menezes) Christenson; Oncidium hydrophilum var. immaculatum L.C.Menezes

= Gomesa hydrophila =

Species of orchid

Gomesa hydrophila is a species of orchid found from Brazil to Paraguay. This species is an epiphyte primarily growing in wetlands. Below ground, this orchid has pseudobulbs which store starches used to support growth. Above ground, the plant has strap-like leaves and blooms in late spring or early summer. The blooms are paniculate on stems which have many flowers. The stems may be held up by surrounding vegetation or erect.

The species was first formally described in 1877 by Rodrigues in his Genera et species orchidearum novarum. In 2009, Mark Wayne Chase and Norris Hagan Williams transferred the species to Gomesa as G. hydrophila in the Annals of Botany.Oxford.
