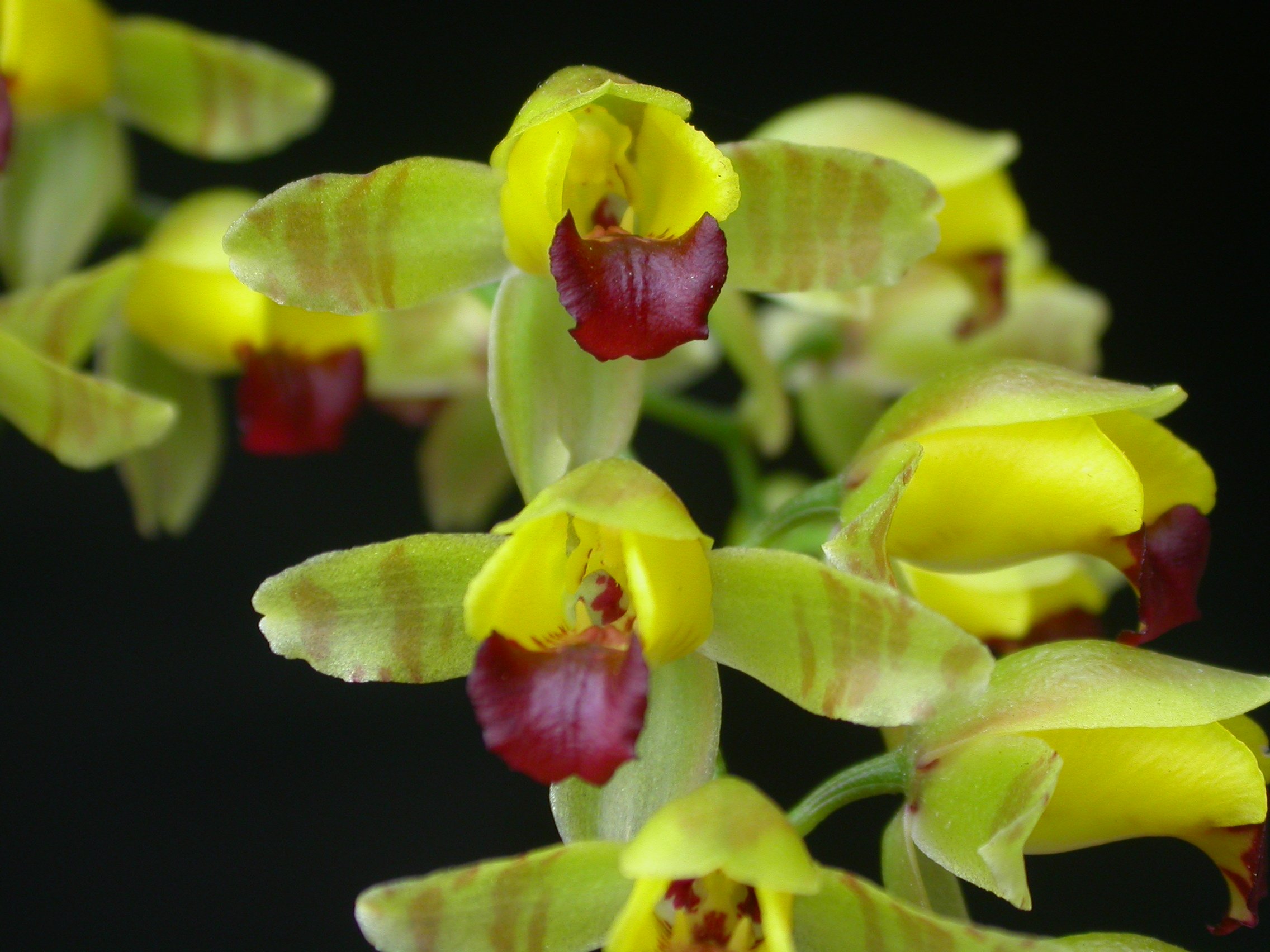

Scientific classification
- Kingdom: Plantae
- Clade: Tracheophytes
- Clade: Angiosperms
- Clade: Monocots
- Order: Asparagales
- Family: Orchidaceae
- Subfamily: Epidendroideae
- Genus: Gomesa
- Species: G. echinata

Binomial name
- Gomesa echinata (Barb.Rodr.) M.W.Chase & N.H.Williams

Synonyms
- Epidendrum tetrapetalum Vell.; Baptistonia echinata Barb.Rodr.; Oncidium echinatum (Barb.Rodr.) Cogn.; Oncidium vellozeanum Pabst; Oncidium brunleesianum Rchb.f.

= Gomesa echinata =

Species of orchid

Gomesa echinata is a species of orchid native to Brazil (Rio de Janeiro). It was formerly within the genus Oncidium until a phylogenetic study published in 2009 transferred it and some other Oncidium species to Gomesa.
