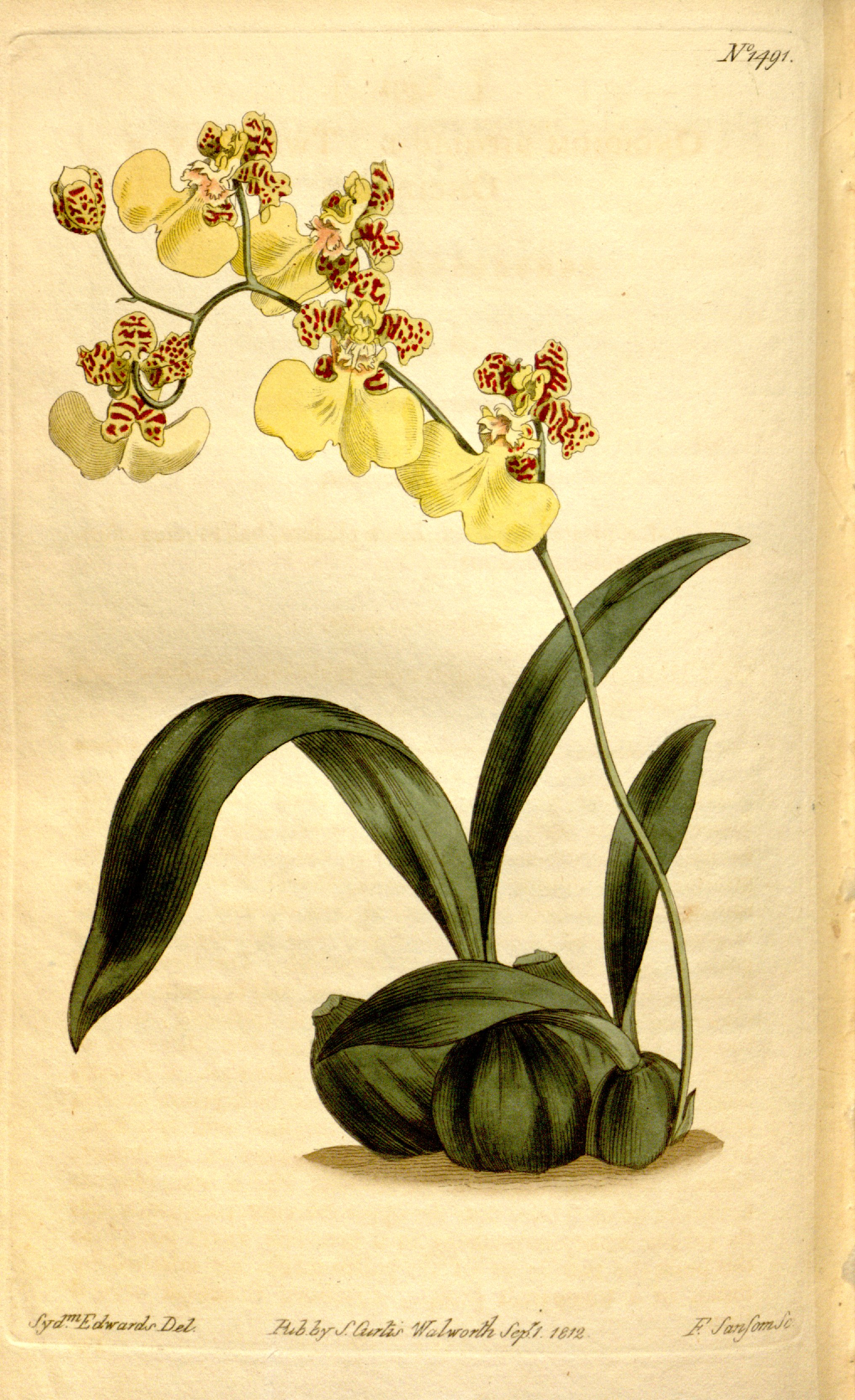

Scientific classification
- Kingdom: Plantae
- Clade: Tracheophytes
- Clade: Angiosperms
- Clade: Monocots
- Order: Asparagales
- Family: Orchidaceae
- Subfamily: Epidendroideae
- Genus: Gomesa
- Species: G. bifolia

Binomial name
- Gomesa bifolia (Sims) M.W.Chase & N.H.Williams,

Synonyms
- Coppensia bifolia (Sims) Dumort.; Oncidium maculosum Lindl.; Oncidium celsianum A.Rich.; Oncidium chrysothyrsus Rchb.f. ex R.Warner; Oncidium batemanianum Griseb.; Oncidium beyrodtianum Schltr.; Oncidium bifolium Sims; Ampliglossum bifolium (Sims) Campacci

= Gomesa bifolia =

Species of orchid

Gomesa bifolia is a species of orchid found in Argentina, Bolivia, Paraguay and Uruguay. It was formerly within the genus Oncidium until a phylogenetic study published in 2009 transferred it and some other Oncidium species to Gomesa.

== Bibliography ==
- Lecoufle M., L'orchidophile : revue de la société française d'orchidophilie n° 114, décembre 1994, pp. 247 s.
