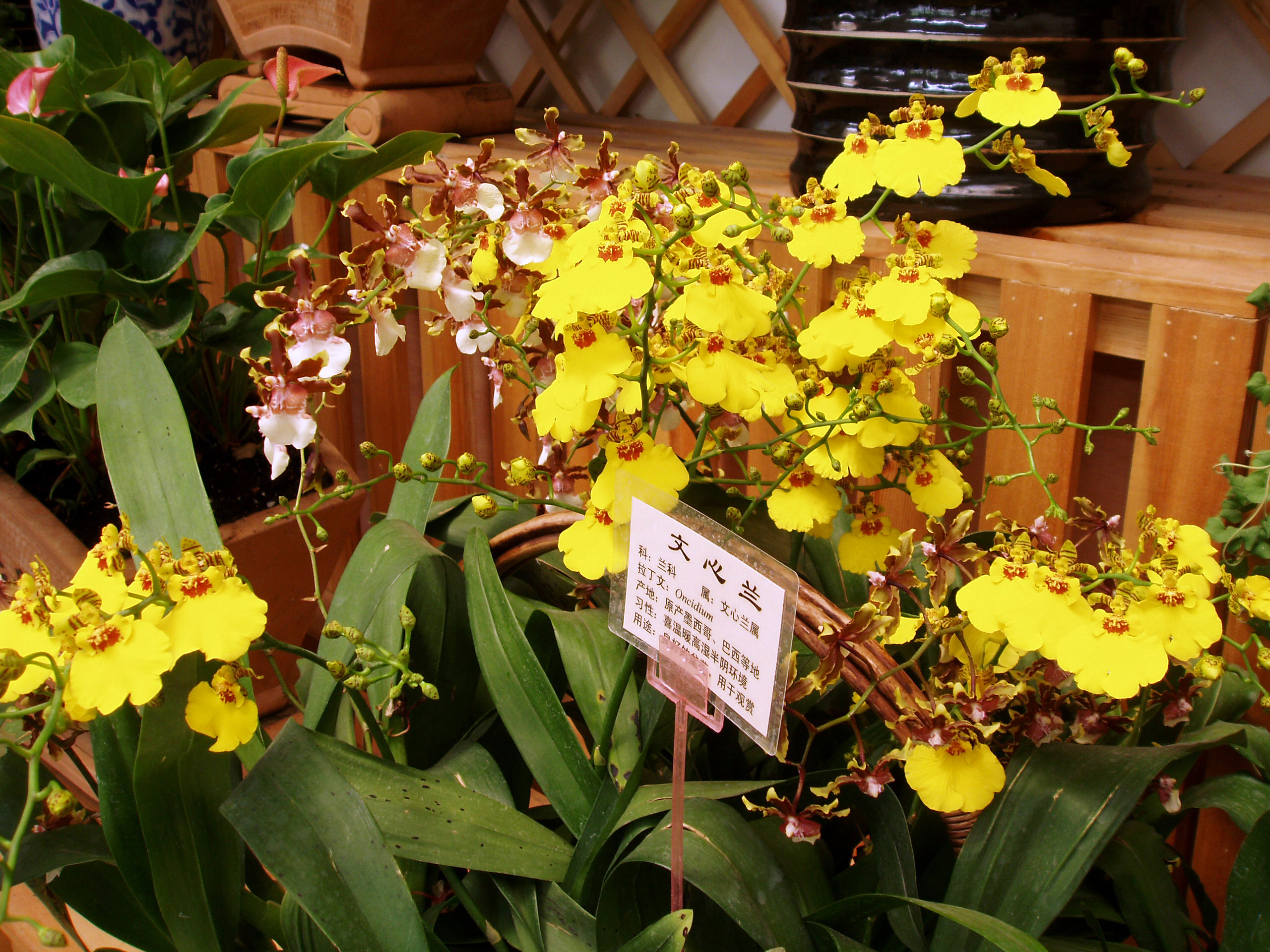

Scientific classification
- Kingdom: Plantae
- Clade: Tracheophytes
- Clade: Angiosperms
- Clade: Monocots
- Order: Asparagales
- Family: Orchidaceae
- Subfamily: Epidendroideae
- Genus: Gomesa
- Species: G. flexuosa

Binomial name
- Gomesa flexuosa (Lodd.) M.W.Chase & N.H.Williams

Synonyms
- Epidendrum lineatum Vell.; Oncidium flexuosum Lodd.; Oncidium haematochrysum Rchb.f.; Oncidium haematoxanthum Rchb.f. ex Lindl.; Oncidium megalopterum Kraenzl.

= Gomesa flexuosa =

Species of orchid

Gomesa flexuosa is a species of orchid found from eastern and southern Brazil to north-central Argentina. It was formerly within the genus Oncidium until a phylogenetic study published in 2009 transferred it and some other Oncidium species to Gomesa.
