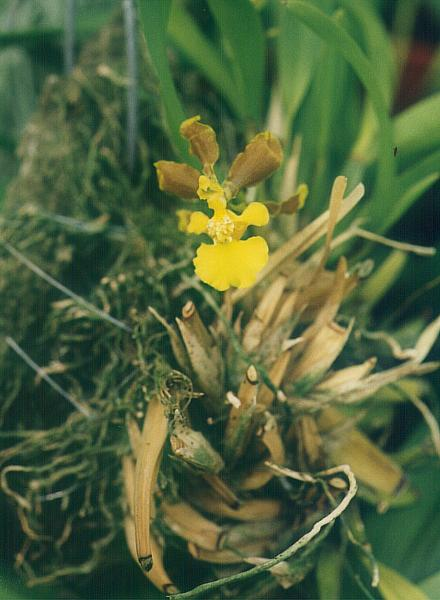

Scientific classification
- Kingdom: Plantae
- Clade: Tracheophytes
- Clade: Angiosperms
- Clade: Monocots
- Order: Asparagales
- Family: Orchidaceae
- Subfamily: Epidendroideae
- Genus: Gomesa
- Species: G. longipes

Binomial name
- Gomesa longipes Lindl. M.W.Chase & N.H.Williams

Synonyms
- Oncidium longipes (Lindl.); Oncidium janeirense Rchb.f.; Oncidium oxyacanthosmum Rchb.f. ex Linden; Oncidium longipes var. monophyllum Regel; Oncidium biflorum Barb.Rodr.; Oncidium hassleri Cogn.; Oncidium monophyllum (Regel) Herter

= Gomesa longipes =

Species of orchid

Gomesa longipes is a species of orchid occurring from south and southeastern Brazil to northeastern Argentina. It was originally classified as Oncidium longipes.
