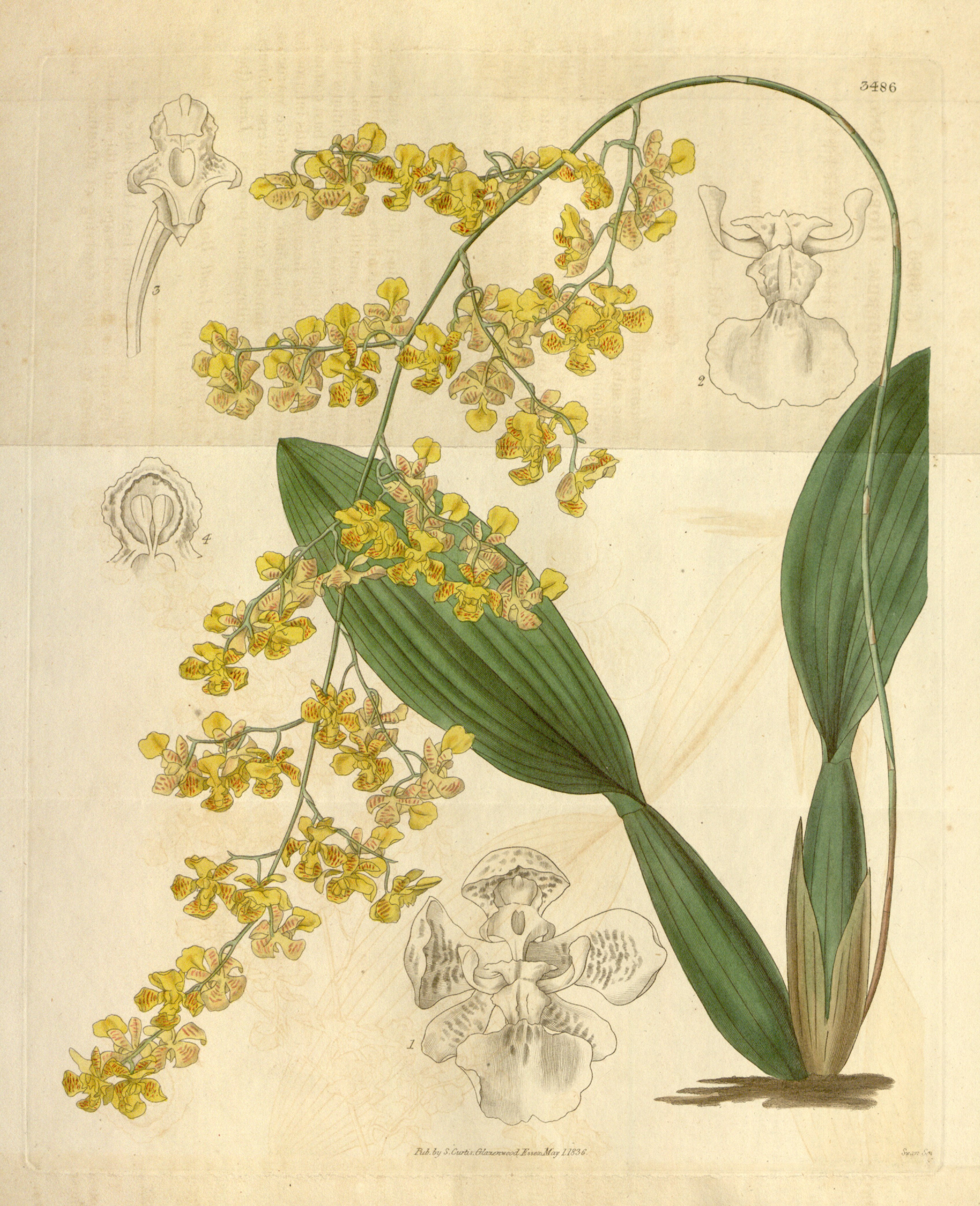

Scientific classification
- Kingdom: Plantae
- Clade: Tracheophytes
- Clade: Angiosperms
- Clade: Monocots
- Order: Asparagales
- Family: Orchidaceae
- Subfamily: Epidendroideae
- Genus: Gomesa
- Species: G. cornigera

Binomial name
- Gomesa cornigera (Lindl.) M.W.Chase & N.H.Williams

Synonyms
- Oncidium chrysorhapis Rchb.f.; Oncidium cornigerum Lindl.; Baptistonia cornigera (Lindl.) Chiron & V.P.Castro

= Gomesa cornigera =

Species of orchid

Gomesa cornigera is a species of orchid found from southern and southeastern Brazil to Paraguay. It was formerly within the genus Oncidium until a phylogenetic study published in 2009 transferred it and some other Oncidium species to Gomesa.
