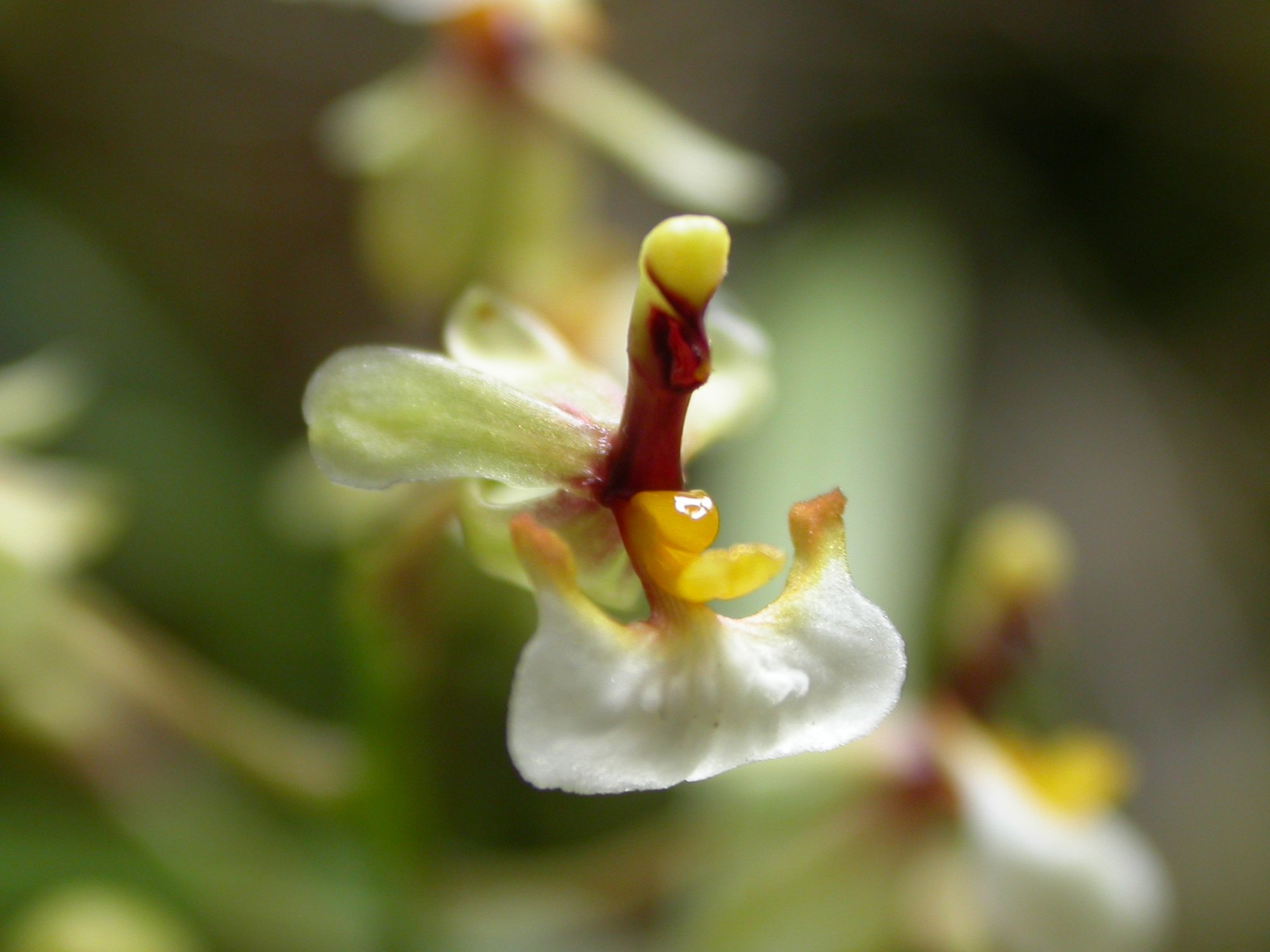

Scientific classification
- Kingdom: Plantae
- Clade: Tracheophytes
- Clade: Angiosperms
- Clade: Monocots
- Order: Asparagales
- Family: Orchidaceae
- Subfamily: Epidendroideae
- Genus: Gomesa
- Species: G. radicans

Binomial name
- Gomesa radicans (Rchb.f.) M.W.Chase & N.H.Williams

Synonyms
- Ornithophora quadricolor Barb.Rodr. Ornithophora radicans (Rchb.f.) Garay & Pabst; Sigmatostalix radicans Rchb.f.

= Gomesa radicans =

Species of orchid

Gomesa radicans is a species of plant from the orchid family, Orchidaceae. Gomesa radicans was previously classified as the only species (Ornithophora radicans) in the genus Ornithophora.
