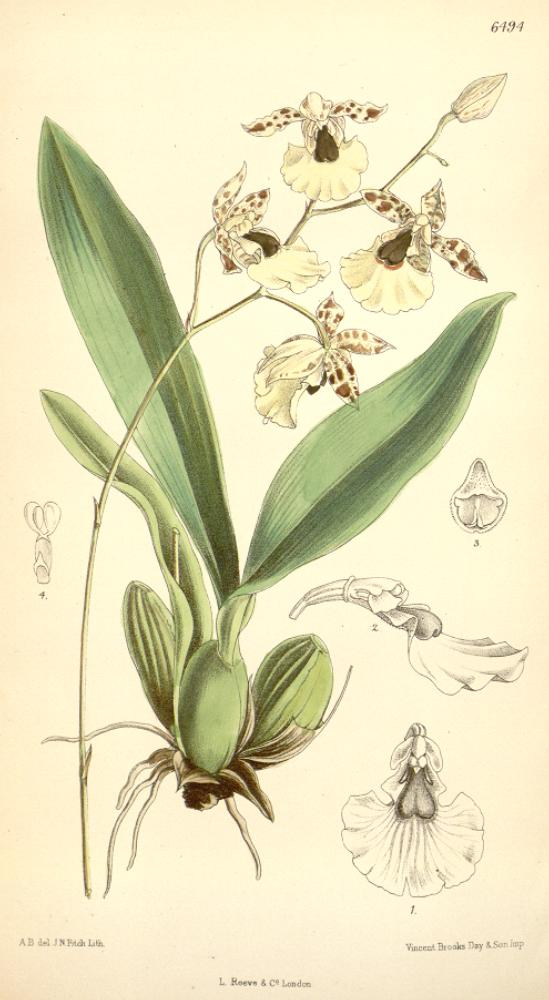

Scientific classification
- Kingdom: Plantae
- Clade: Tracheophytes
- Clade: Angiosperms
- Clade: Monocots
- Order: Asparagales
- Family: Orchidaceae
- Subfamily: Epidendroideae
- Genus: Gomesa
- Species: G. dasytyle

Binomial name
- Gomesa dasytyle (Rchb.f.) M.W.Chase & N.H.Williams

Synonyms
- Carenidium dasytyle (Rchb.f.) Baptista; Oncidium dasystyle Rchb.f.

= Gomesa dasytyle =

Species of orchid

Gomesa dasytyle is a species of orchid endemic to Brazil (Rio de Janeiro). It was formerly within the genus Oncidium until a phylogenetic study published in 2009 transferred it and some other Oncidium species to Gomesa.
