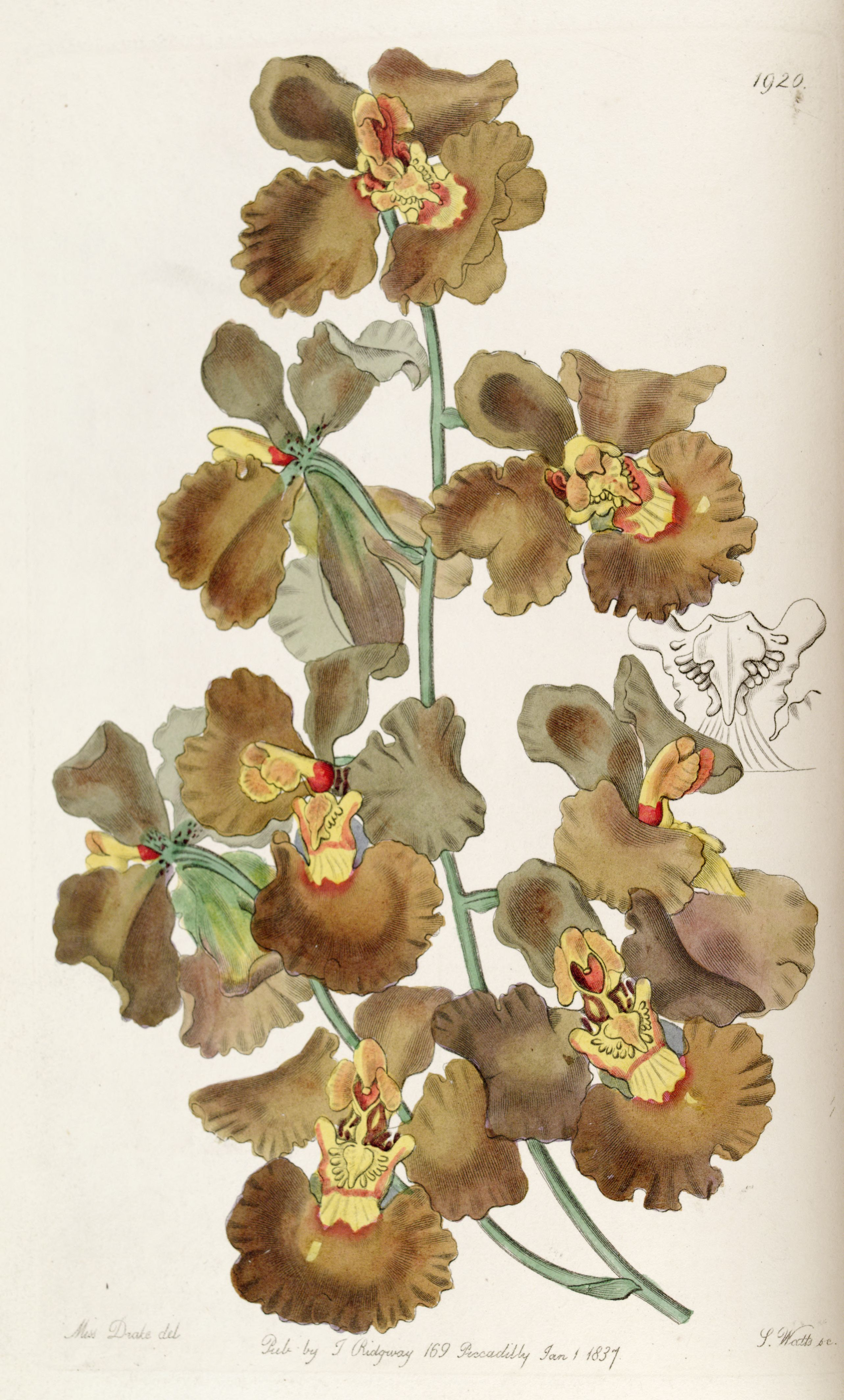

Scientific classification
- Kingdom: Plantae
- Clade: Tracheophytes
- Clade: Angiosperms
- Clade: Monocots
- Order: Asparagales
- Family: Orchidaceae
- Subfamily: Epidendroideae
- Genus: Gomesa
- Species: G. imperatoris-maximiliani

Binomial name
- Gomesa imperatoris-maximiliani (Rchb.f.) M.W.Chase & N.H.Williams

Synonyms
- Anettea crispa (G.Lodd. ex Lindl.) Szlach. & Mytnik; Anettea imperatoris-maximiliani (Rchb.f.) Szlach. & Mytnik; Brasilidium crispum (G.Lodd. ex Lindl.) Campacci; Brasilidium imperatoris-maximiliani (Rchb.f.) Szlach. & Kolan.; Oncidium crispum G.Lodd. ex Lindl.; Oncidium imperatoris-maximiliani Rchb.f.

= Gomesa imperatoris-maximiliani =

Species of orchid

Gomesa imperatoris-maximiliani is a species of orchid endemic to eastern and southern Brazil.

== Taxonomy ==
The species was first described as Oncidium crispum by John Lindley in 1833 with the name attributed to George Loddiges. Independently, in 1866, Heinrich Gustav Reichenbach described Oncidium imperatoris-maximiliani. The two were later synonymized and in 2009 transferred to the genus Gomesa along with other South American Oncidium species. As the name Gomesa crispa was already occupied, the newer epithet imperatoris-maximiliani was used.
