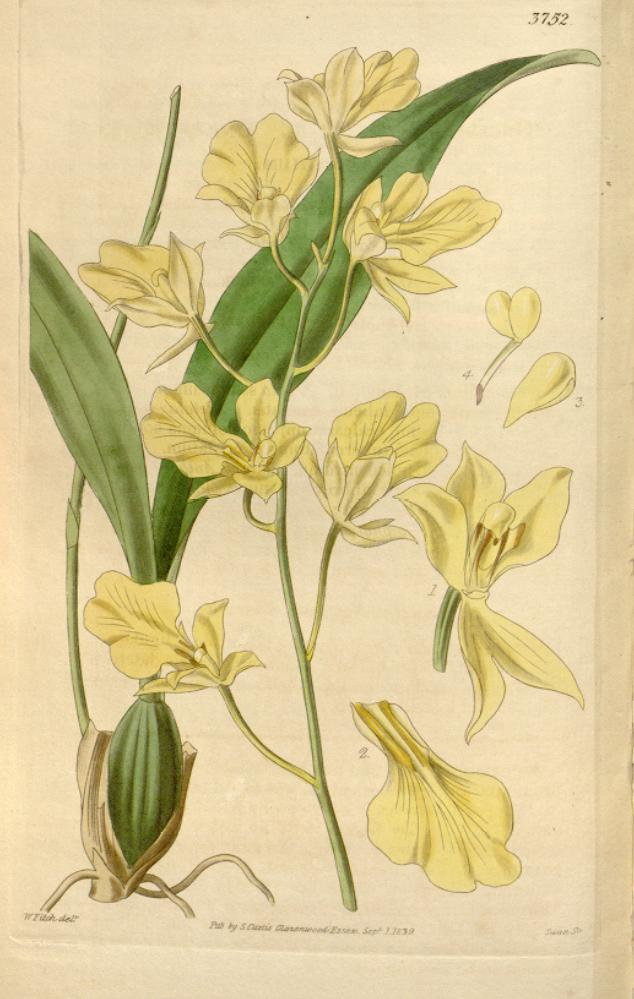

Scientific classification
- Kingdom: Plantae
- Clade: Tracheophytes
- Clade: Angiosperms
- Clade: Monocots
- Order: Asparagales
- Family: Orchidaceae
- Subfamily: Epidendroideae
- Genus: Gomesa
- Species: G. concolor

Binomial name
- Gomesa concolor (Hook.) M.W.Chase & N.H.Williams

Synonyms
- Cyrtochilum citrinum Hook.; Oncidium concolor Hook.; Oncidium unguiculatum Klotzsch; Oncidium normanii Pritz.; Carenidium concolor (Hook.) Baptista

= Gomesa concolor =

Species of orchid

Gomesa concolor is a species of orchid found from southern and southeastern Brazil to northeastern Argentina. It was formerly within the genus Oncidium until a phylogenetic study published in 2009 transferred it and some other Oncidium species to Gomesa.
