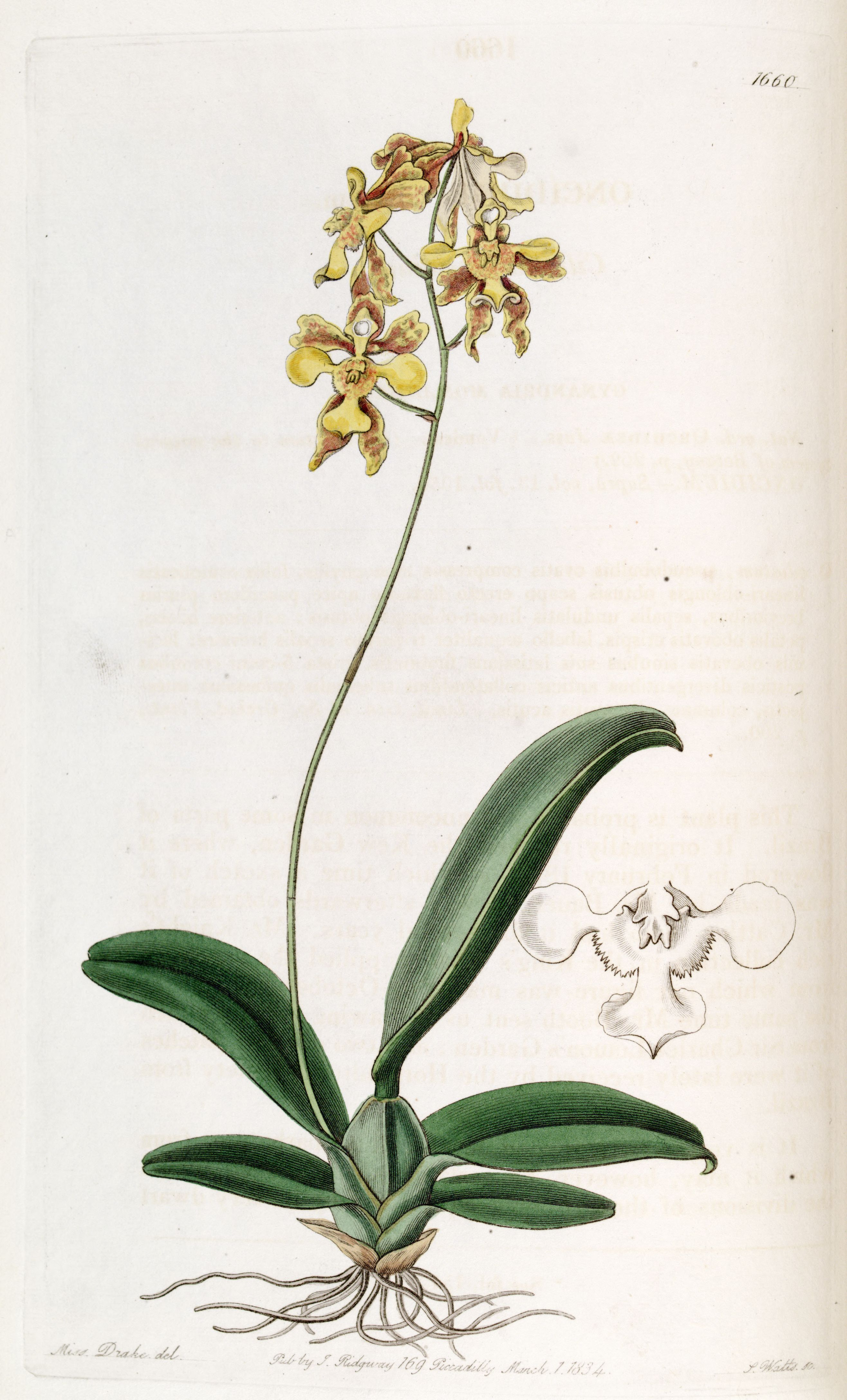

Scientific classification
- Kingdom: Plantae
- Clade: Tracheophytes
- Clade: Angiosperms
- Clade: Monocots
- Order: Asparagales
- Family: Orchidaceae
- Subfamily: Epidendroideae
- Genus: Gomesa
- Species: G. ciliata

Binomial name
- Gomesa ciliata (Lindl.) M.W.Chase & N.H.Williams

Synonyms
- See text

= Gomesa ciliata =

Species of orchid

Gomesa ciliata is a species of orchid found in Brazil and Bolivia. It was formerly within the genus Oncidium until a phylogenetic study published in 2009 transferred it and some other Oncidium species to Gomesa.

== Synonyms ==
Adapted from Plants of the World Online:

- Oncidium barbatum var. ciliatum (Lindl.) Lindl.
- Oncidium ciliatum Lindl.
- Oncidium ciliolatum Hoffmanns.
- Oncidium fimbriatum Hoffmanns.
- Oncidium subciliatum Hoffmanns.
- Oncidium barbatum Lindl. & Paxton
- Oncidium trichodes Lindl.
- Oncidium micropogon var. bahiense Cogn.
- Oncidium blossfeldianum Schltr.
- Oncidium bahiense (Cogn.) Schltr.
- Oncidium psyche Schltr.
- Oncidium reisii Hoehne & Schltr.
- Alatiglossum psyche (Schltr.) Baptista
- Alatiglossum trichodes (Lindl.) Baptista
- Alatiglossum ciliatum (Lindl.) Baptista
