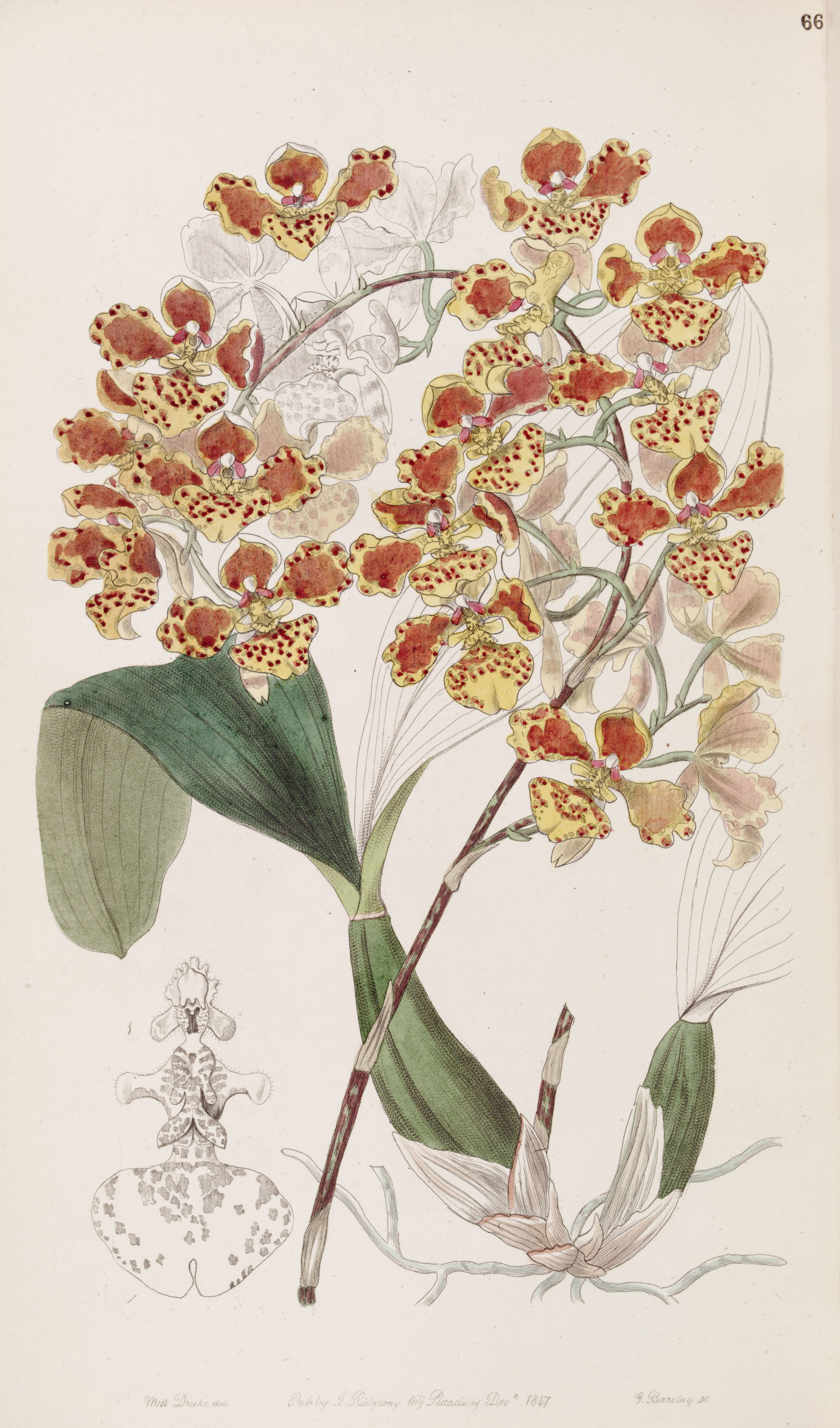

Scientific classification
- Kingdom: Plantae
- Clade: Tracheophytes
- Clade: Angiosperms
- Clade: Monocots
- Order: Asparagales
- Family: Orchidaceae
- Subfamily: Epidendroideae
- Genus: Gomesa
- Species: G. × amicta

Binomial name
- Gomesa × amicta (Lindl.) M.W.Chase & N.H.Williams

Synonyms
- Baptistonia × amicta (Lindl.) Chiron & V.P.Castro; Oncidium × amictum Lindl.

= Gomesa × amicta =

Species of orchid

Gomesa × amicta is a hybrid of orchid endemic to southeastern Brazil. It is a hybrid of Gomesa lietzei and Gomesa sarcodes. It was formerly within the genus Oncidium until a phylogenetic study published in 2009 transferred it and some other Oncidium species to Gomesa.
