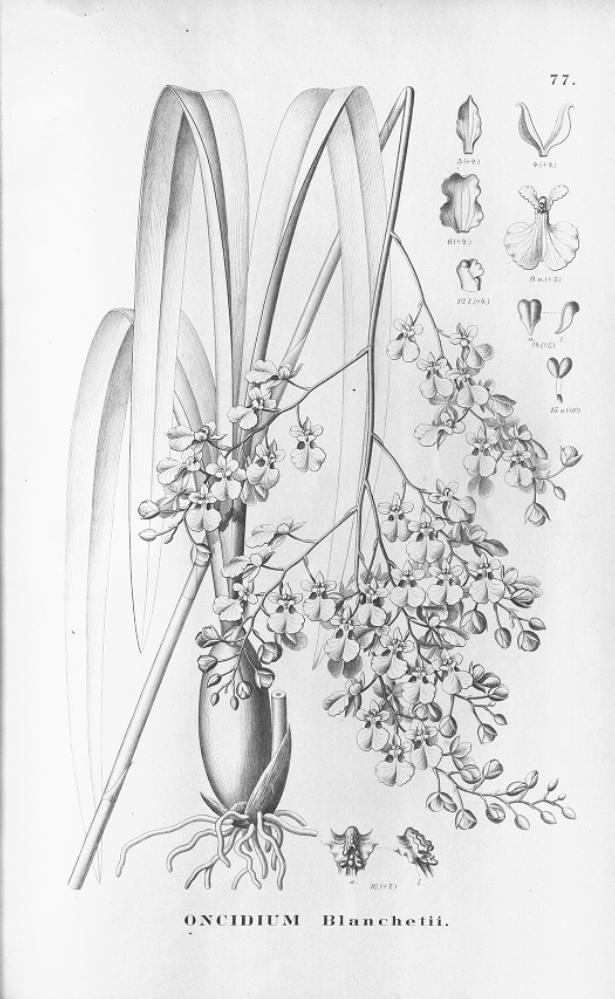

Scientific classification
- Kingdom: Plantae
- Clade: Tracheophytes
- Clade: Angiosperms
- Clade: Monocots
- Order: Asparagales
- Family: Orchidaceae
- Subfamily: Epidendroideae
- Genus: Gomesa
- Species: G. blanchetii

Binomial name
- Gomesa blanchetii Rchb.f.

Synonyms
- Ampliglossum blanchetii (Rchb.f.) Campacci; Coppensia blanchetii (Rchb.f.) Campacci; Oncidium blanchetii (Rchb.f.)

= Gomesa blanchetii =

Species of orchid

Gomesa blanchetii is a species of orchid native to eastern and southern Brazil. Found in the cool mountains, hot and humid lowlands and inland savannahs of eastern and southeastern Brazil as a medium-sized, cool growing epiphyte that occurs at elevations of 800 to 2000 meters with clustered, erect, oblong or narrowly ovoid-oblong, compressed, smooth and then sulcate with age pseudobulbs carrying 3 apical, erect, rigid, coriaceous, narrowly linear-ligulate, acute leaves and blooms in the spring through summer on an erect, 2' to 5'4"" (60 to 160 cm) long, robust, paniculate, many flowered inflorescence that is longer than the leaves and has concave, lanceolate bracts.
