= James Forbes (botanist) =

James Forbes (May 1773 – 6 July 1861) was a British gardener and botanist.

Forbes was born in May 1773 in Bridgend, Perthshire. He was the gardener for the Duke of Bedford at Woburn Abbey. He became a member of the Linnean Society of London in 1832. He was the author of Salictum Woburnense (1829), Hortus Woburnensis (1833), Journal of Horticultural Tour through Germany, Belgium and Part of France in... 1835 (1837) and Pinetum Woburnense (1839).

Sir William Jackson Hooker (1785 – 1865) named the species Oncidium forbesii (in the family of Orchidaceae) after him. Forbes became a member of the Royal Society on 24 March 1803.

Forbes died on 6 July 1681, at Woburn Abbey, Bedfordshire, aged 88.
