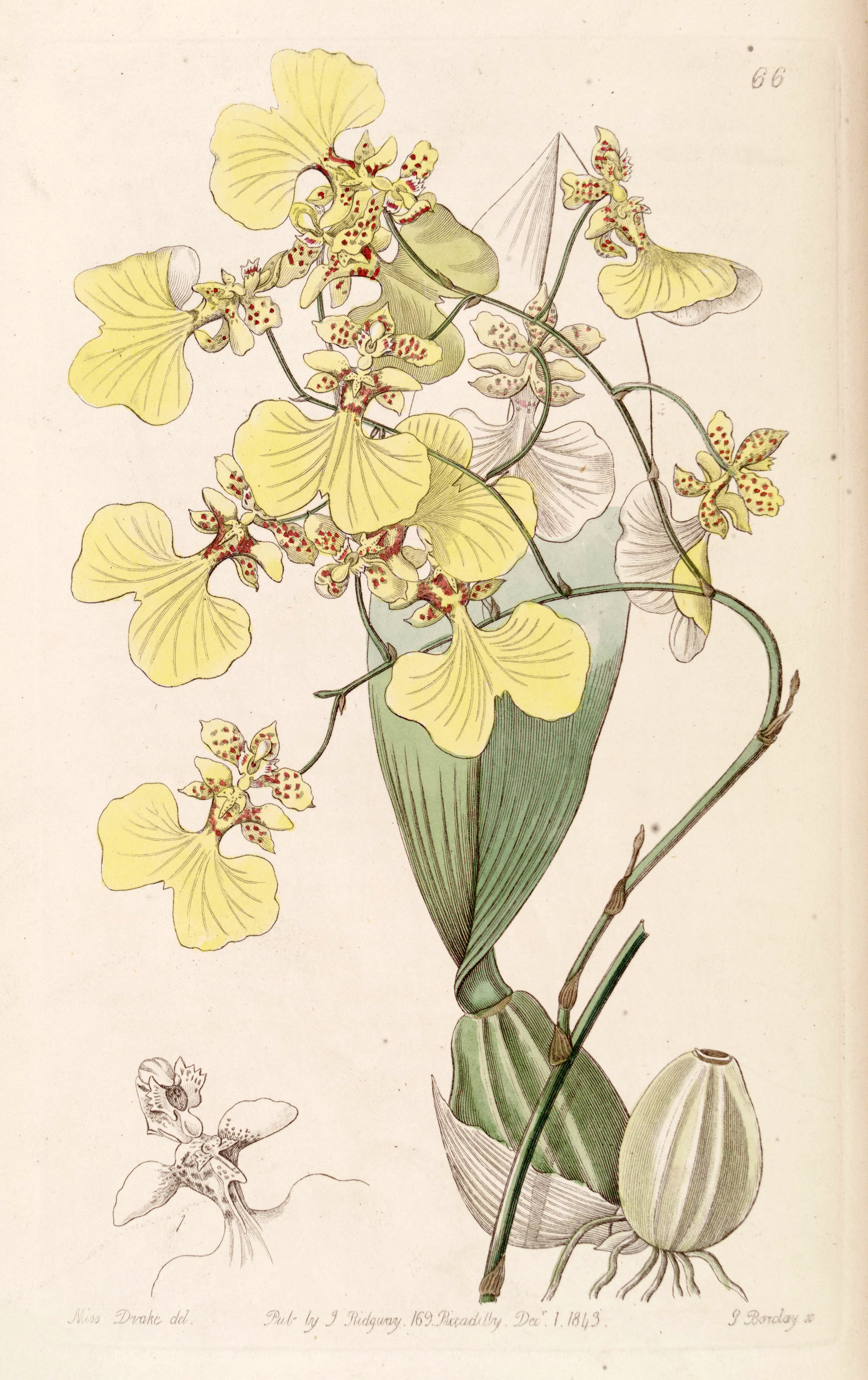

Scientific classification
- Kingdom: Plantae
- Clade: Tracheophytes
- Clade: Angiosperms
- Clade: Monocots
- Order: Asparagales
- Family: Orchidaceae
- Subfamily: Epidendroideae
- Genus: Gomesa
- Species: G. bicolor

Binomial name
- Gomesa bicolor Lindl.

Synonyms
- Ampliglossum bicolor (Lindl.) Campacci; Coppensia bicolor (Lindl.) Campacci; Oncidium bicolor (Lindl.)

= Gomesa bicolor =

Species of orchid

Gomesa bicolor is a species of orchid ranging from northeastern Venezuela to Brazil.

== History ==
Discovered in 1843, Gomesa bicolor was published in "Edwards's Botanical Register 29: 66" by John Lindley.
