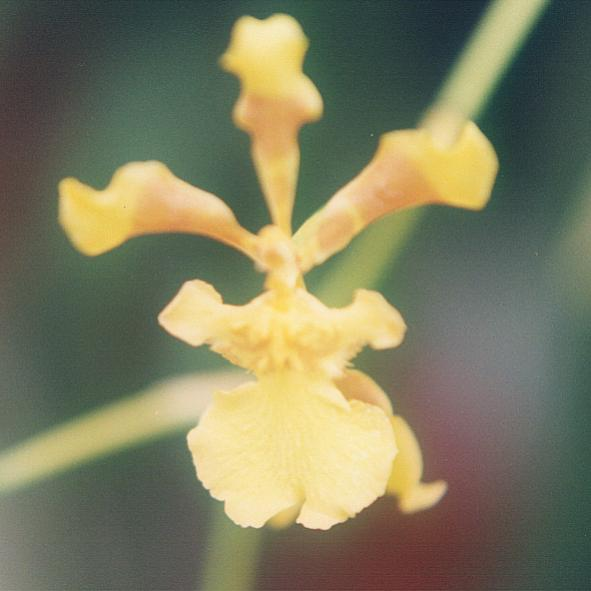

Scientific classification
- Kingdom: Plantae
- Clade: Tracheophytes
- Clade: Angiosperms
- Clade: Monocots
- Order: Asparagales
- Family: Orchidaceae
- Subfamily: Epidendroideae
- Genus: Gomesa
- Species: G. croesus

Binomial name
- Gomesa croesus (Rchb.f.) M.W.Chase & N.H.Williams

Synonyms
- Oncidium eurycline Rchb.f.; Oncidium croesus Rchb.f.

= Gomesa croesus =

Species of orchid

Gomesa croesus is a species of orchid that is endemic to Brazil (Pernambuco to Rio de Janeiro state).
