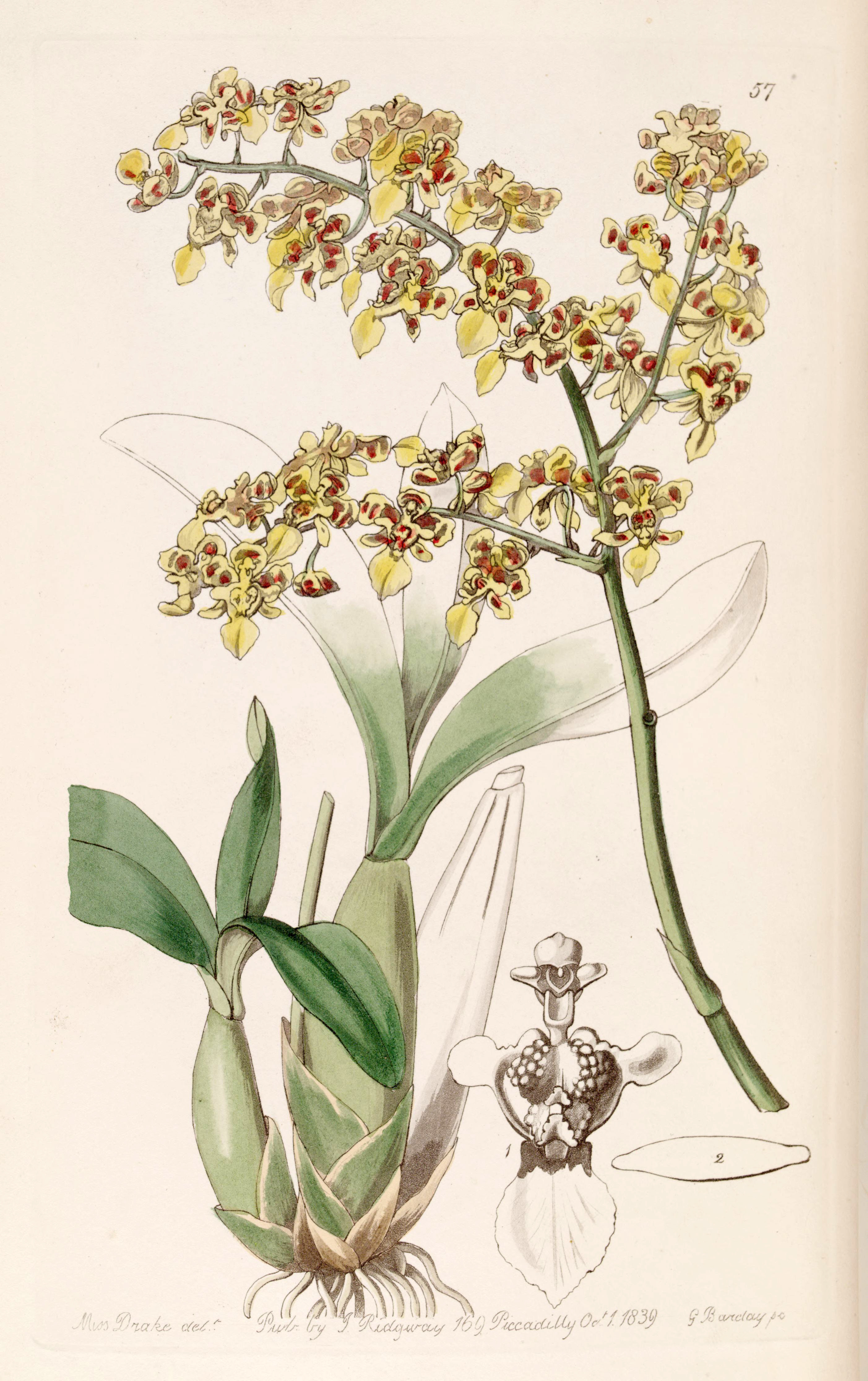

Scientific classification
- Kingdom: Plantae
- Clade: Tracheophytes
- Clade: Angiosperms
- Clade: Monocots
- Order: Asparagales
- Family: Orchidaceae
- Subfamily: Epidendroideae
- Genus: Gomesa
- Species: G. venusta

Binomial name
- Gomesa venusta (Drapiez) M. W. Chase & N. H. Williams

Synonyms
- Oncidium venustum Drapiez; Oncidium galeatum Scheidw.; Oncidium trulliferum Lindl.; Oncidium dimorphum Regel; Oncidium ornithocephaloides Kraenzl.; Carenidium venustum (Drapiez) Baptista

= Gomesa venusta =

Species of orchid

Gomesa venusta is a species of orchid endemic to Brazil (Rio de Janeiro, Paraná).
