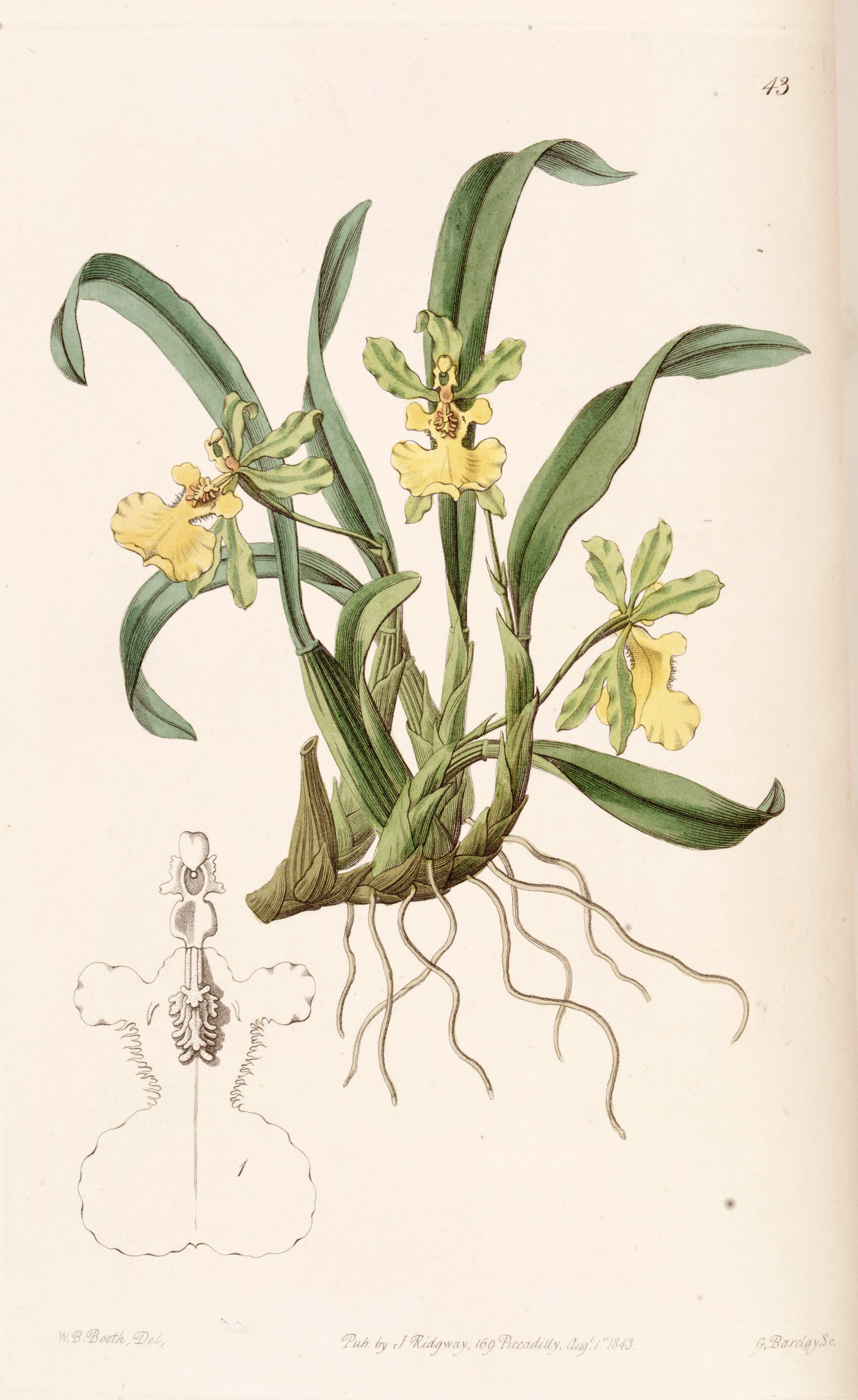

Scientific classification
- Kingdom: Plantae
- Clade: Tracheophytes
- Clade: Angiosperms
- Clade: Monocots
- Order: Asparagales
- Family: Orchidaceae
- Subfamily: Epidendroideae
- Genus: Gomesa
- Species: G. uniflora

Binomial name
- Gomesa uniflora (Booth ex Lindl.) M.W.Chase & N.H.Williams

Synonyms
- Alatiglossum uniflorum (Booth ex Lindl.) Baptista; Kleberiella uniflora (Booth ex Lindl.) V.P.Castro & Cath.; Oncidium biflorum Barb.Rodr.; Oncidium uniflorum Booth ex Lindl.

= Gomesa uniflora =

Species of orchid

Gomesa uniflora, synonym Oncidium uniflorum, is a species of orchid endemic to southern and southeastern Brazil.

== Taxonomy ==
The species was first described by John Lindley in 1843 as Oncidium uniflorum; the name was attributed to William Beattie Booth. The specific epithet uniflorum is Latin for 'single-flowered', referring to the plant's inflorescence.

By 2006, it was well known that genus Oncidium was not monophyletic. In a 2006 revision of the genus Oncidium and its relatives, O. uniflorum was placed in the newly erected genus Alatiglossum as Alatiglossum uniflorum. Later in the same year, it was treated as the type species of the new genus Kleberiella. In 2009, it was transferred to an enlarged genus Gomesa which included Alatiglossum and Kleberiella. This placement is accepted by Plants of the World Online as of October 2025.
