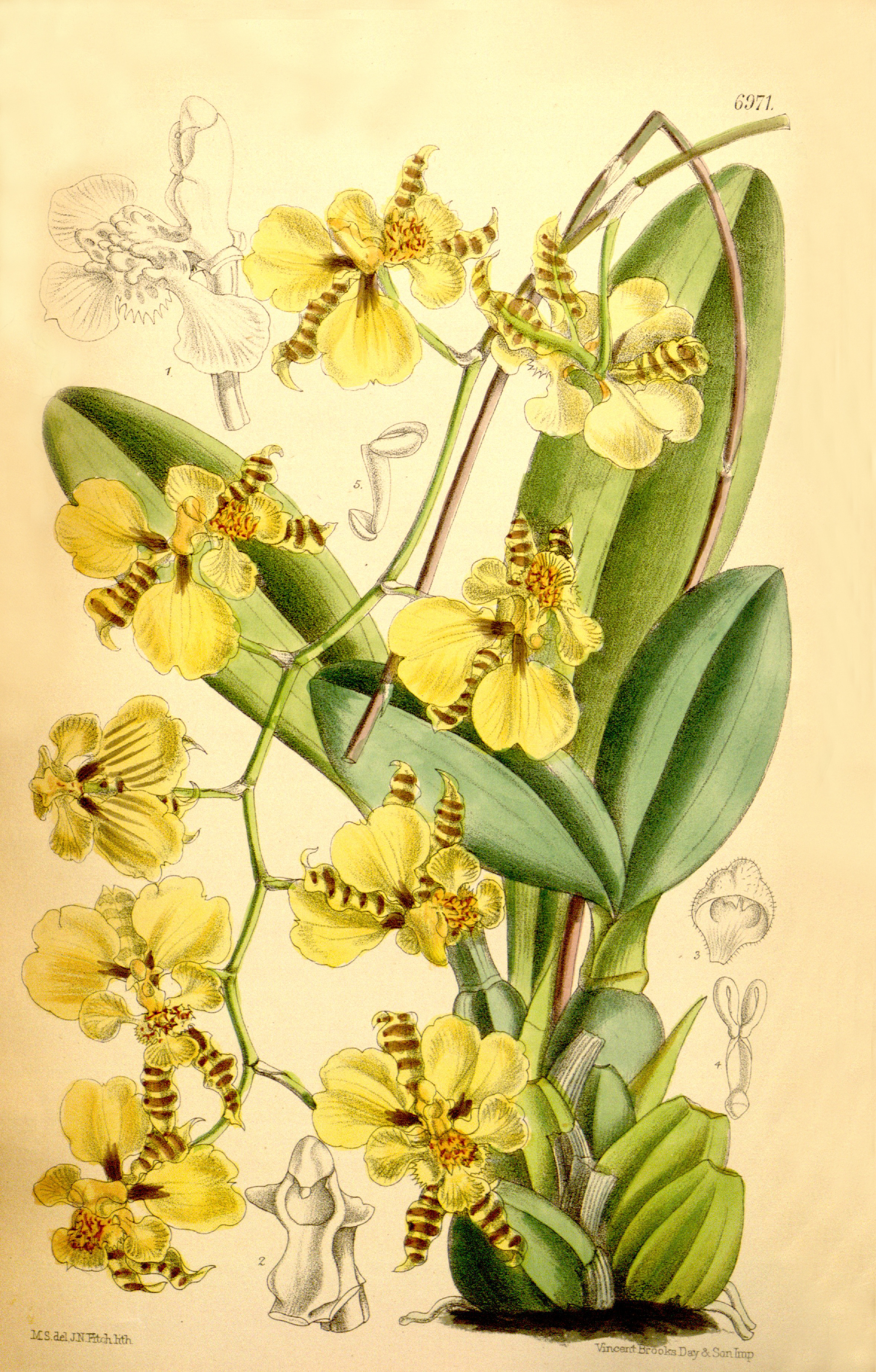

Scientific classification
- Kingdom: Plantae
- Clade: Tracheophytes
- Clade: Angiosperms
- Clade: Monocots
- Order: Asparagales
- Family: Orchidaceae
- Subfamily: Epidendroideae
- Genus: Gomesa
- Species: G. micropogon

Binomial name
- Gomesa micropogon Rchb.f.

Synonyms
- Oncidium dentatum Klotzsch; Oncidium macropetalum Klotzsch; Alatiglossum micropogon (Rchb.f.) Baptista; Oncidium micropogon (Rchb.f.)

= Gomesa micropogon =

Species of orchid

Gomesa micropogon is a species of orchid endemic to southeastern Brazil.
