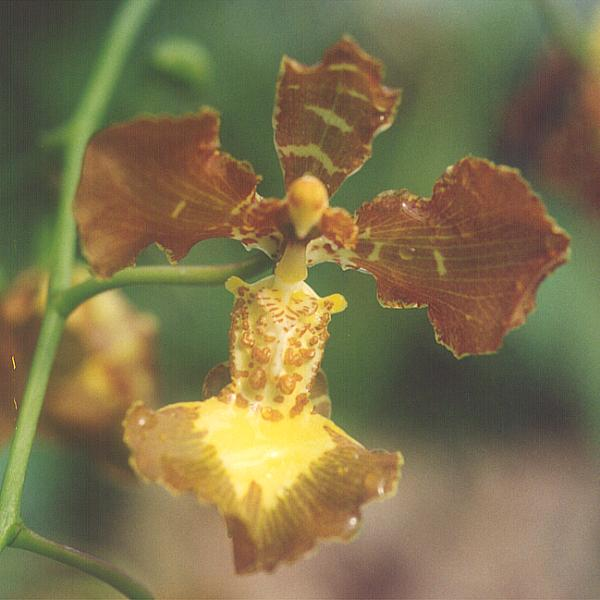

Scientific classification
- Kingdom: Plantae
- Clade: Tracheophytes
- Clade: Angiosperms
- Clade: Monocots
- Order: Asparagales
- Family: Orchidaceae
- Subfamily: Epidendroideae
- Genus: Gomesa
- Species: G. forbesii

Binomial name
- Gomesa forbesii (Hook.) M.W.Chase & N.H.Williams

Synonyms
- Anettea forbesii (Hook.) Szlach. & Mytnik; Brasilidium forbesii (Hook.) Campacci; Oncidium forbesii Hook.

= Gomesa forbesii =

Species of orchid

Gomesa forbesii is a species of orchid native to southeastern Brazil. It was formerly within the genus Oncidium until a phylogenetic study published in 2009 transferred it and some other Oncidium species to Gomesa.
