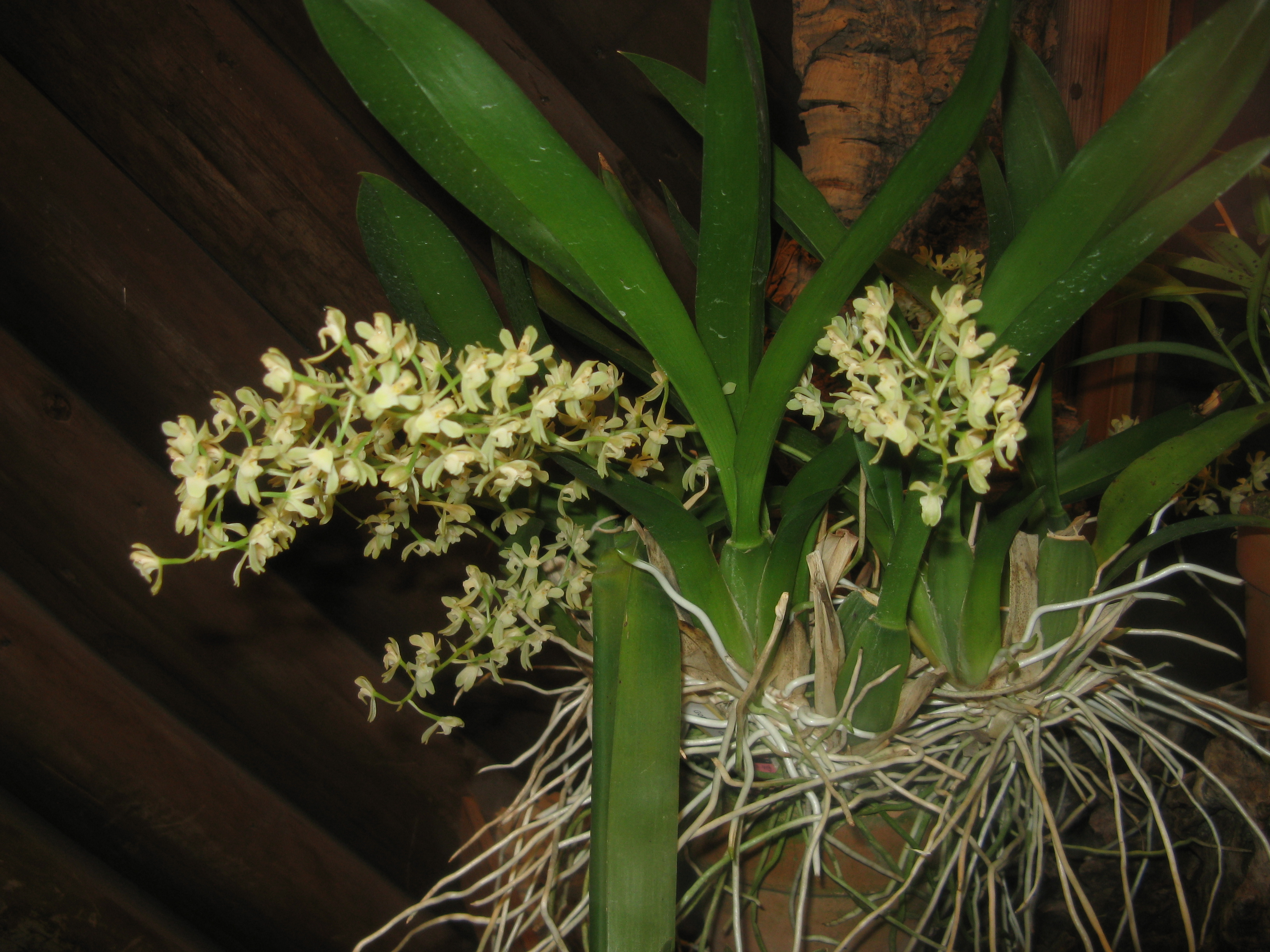
- In cultivation at Osaka Prefectural Flowers Garden

Scientific classification
- Kingdom: Plantae
- Clade: Tracheophytes
- Clade: Angiosperms
- Clade: Monocots
- Order: Asparagales
- Family: Orchidaceae
- Subfamily: Epidendroideae
- Genus: Gomesa
- Species: G. crispa

Binomial name
- Gomesa crispa (Lindl.) Klotzsch ex Rchb.f.

Synonyms
- Gomesa undulata Hoffmanns.; Odontoglossum crispatulum Rchb.f.; Rodriguezia crispa Lindl.

= Gomesa crispa =

Species of plant

Gomesa crispa is a species of flowering plant in the orchid family Orchidaceae, native to south and southeast Brazil and Paraguay. It was first described in 1839.

== Taxonomy ==
Gomesa crispa was first described in 1839 by John Lindley as Rodriguezia crispa. The placement in Gomesa as G. crispa was first published by Heinrich Gustav Reichenbach in 1852 with the name attributed to Johann Friedrich Klotzsch. Because of the prior publication of this name, when Oncidium crispum was transferred to Gomesa, it had to use an earlier epithet and become Gomesa imperatoris-maximiliani.

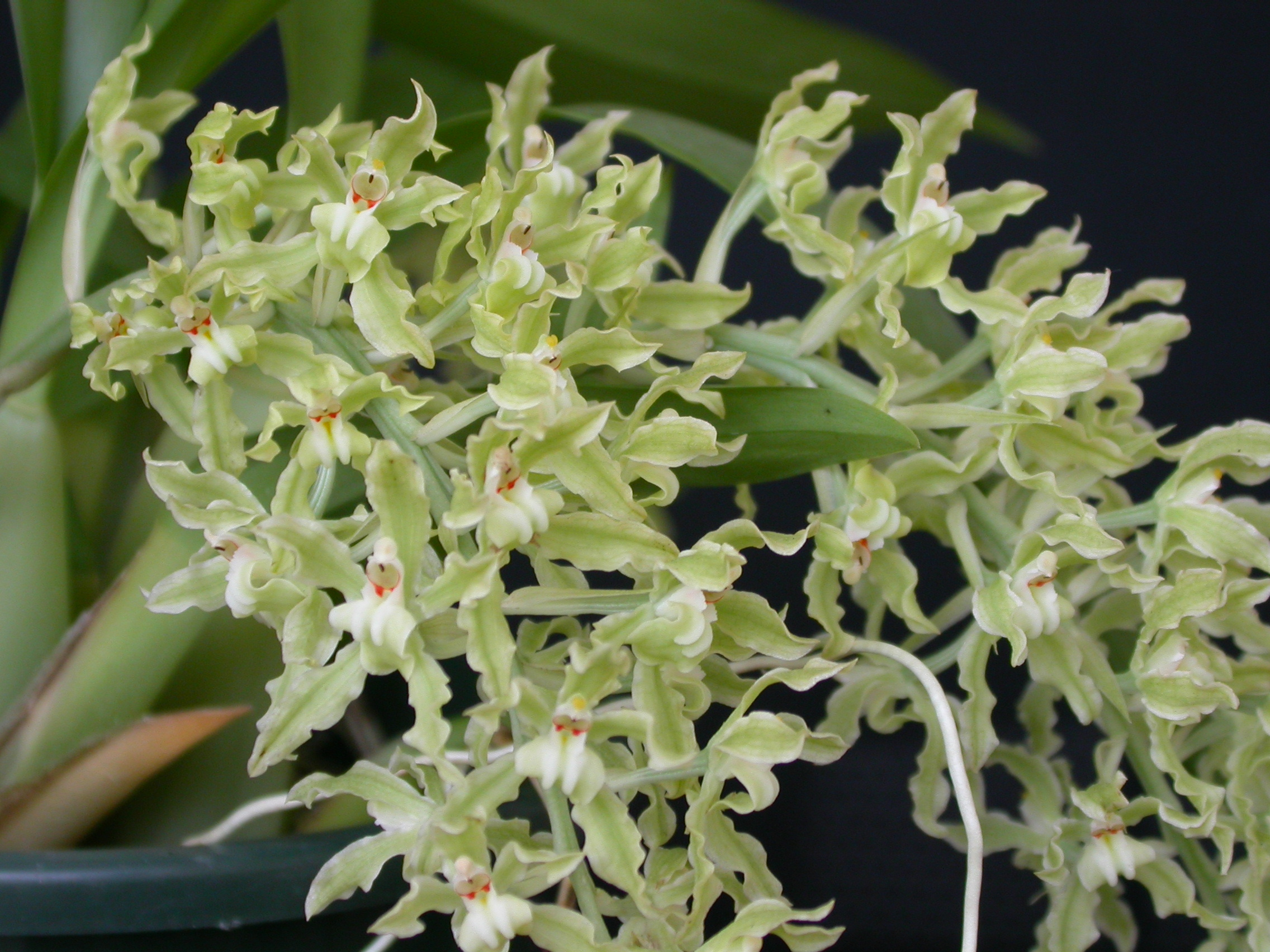
Flowers
