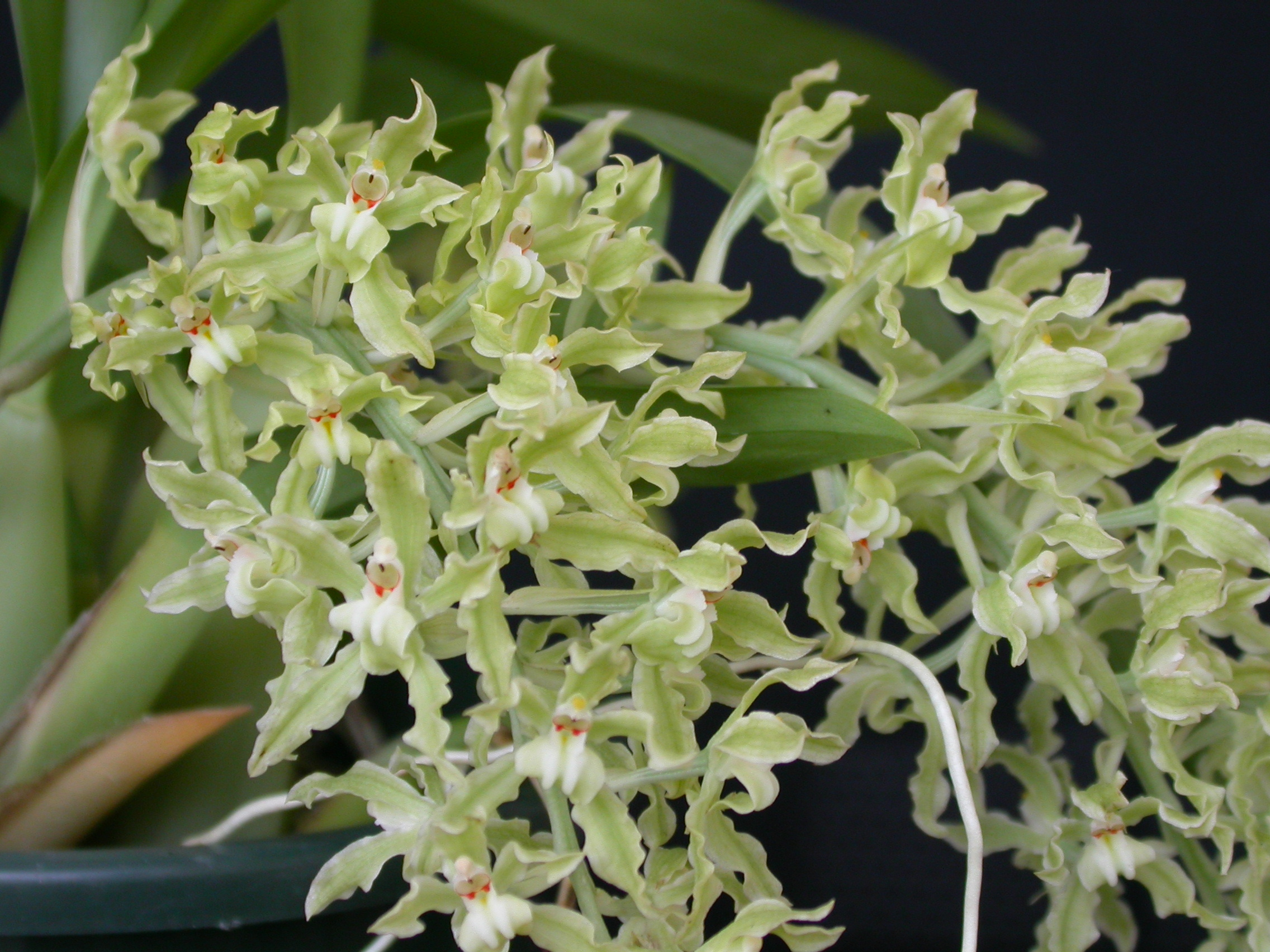
- Gomesa crispa

Scientific classification
- Kingdom: Plantae
- Clade: Tracheophytes
- Clade: Angiosperms
- Clade: Monocots
- Order: Asparagales
- Family: Orchidaceae
- Subfamily: Epidendroideae
- Tribe: Cymbidieae
- Subtribe: Oncidiinae
- Genus: Gomesa; R.Br.

Synonyms
- Coppensia Dumort; Maturna Raf.; Baptistonia Barb.Rodr.; Ornithophora Barb.Rodr.; Waluewa Regel; Rodrigueziella Kuntze; Binotia Rolfe; Rodrigueziopsis Schltr.; Hellerorchis A.D.Hawkes; Alatiglossum Baptista; Ampliglossum Campacci; Anettea Szlach. & Mytnik; Brasilidium Campacci; Carenidium Baptista; Carriella V.P.Castro & K.G.Lacerda; Castroa Guiard; Concocidium Romowicz & Szlach.; Kleberiella V.P.Castro & Cath.; Menezesiella Chiron & V.P.Castro; Neoruschia Cath. & V.P.Castro; Rhinocerotidium Szlach.; Rhinocidium Baptista; Nitidocidium F.Barros & V.T.Rodrigues; Campaccia Baptista, P.A.Harding & V.P.Castro; Hardingia Docha Neto & Baptista

= Gomesa =

Genus of orchids

Gomesa is a genus of flowering plants from the orchid family, Orchidaceae. It contains about 80–100 species, all native to South America. The genus is abbreviated as Gom.

== Species ==
This genus contains many species that were previously assigned to Oncidium.

As of October 2025, Plants of the World Online accepted 127 species and 8 hybrids:

- Gomesa adamantina (Marçal & Cath.) M.W.Chase & N.H.Williams
- Gomesa albinoi (Schltr.) M.W.Chase & N.H.Williams
- Gomesa alpina Porsch
- Gomesa alvesiana (Campacci) J.M.H.Shaw
- Gomesa barbaceniae (Lindl.) M.W.Chase & N.H.Williams
- Gomesa barbata (Lindl.) M.W.Chase & N.H.Williams
- Gomesa barkeri (Hook.) Rolfe
- Gomesa bicolor (Lindl.) M.W.Chase & N.H.Williams
- Gomesa bicornuta (Hook.) Meneguzzo
- Gomesa bifolia (Sims) M.W.Chase & N.H.Williams
- Gomesa blahae J.M.H.Shaw
- Gomesa blanchetii (Rchb.f.) M.W.Chase & N.H.Williams
- Gomesa bohnkiana (V.P.Castro & G.F.Carr) M.W.Chase & N.H.Williams
- Gomesa brasiliensis (Rolfe) M.W.Chase & N.H.Williams
- Gomesa brieniana (Rchb.f.) M.W.Chase & N.H.Williams
- Gomesa caatingana J.M.P.Cordeiro, L.P.Félix & M.W.Chase
- Gomesa caldensis (Rchb.f.) M.W.Chase & N.H.Williams
- Gomesa calimaniana (Guiard) M.W.Chase & N.H.Williams
- Gomesa calimaniorum (V.P.Castro & G.F.Carr) J.M.H.Shaw
- Gomesa carlosregentii Lückel
- Gomesa chapadensis (V.P.Castro & Campacci) M.W.Chase & N.H.Williams
- Gomesa chrysoptera (Lindl.) M.W.Chase & N.H.Williams
- Gomesa chrysopterantha (Lückel) M.W.Chase & N.H.Williams
- Gomesa ciliata (Lindl.) M.W.Chase & N.H.Williams
- Gomesa cogniauxiana (Schltr.) M.W.Chase & N.H.Williams
- Gomesa colorata (Königer & J.G.Weinm.) M.W.Chase & N.H.Williams
- Gomesa concolor (Hook.) M.W.Chase & N.H.Williams
- Gomesa cornigera (Lindl.) M.W.Chase & N.H.Williams
- Gomesa crispa (Lindl.) Klotzsch ex Rchb.f.
- Gomesa croesus (Rchb.f.) M.W.Chase & N.H.Williams
- Gomesa culuenensis (Docha Neto & Benelli) Lückel
- Gomesa cuneata (Scheidw.) M.W.Chase & N.H.Williams
- Gomesa dasytyle (Rchb.f.) M.W.Chase & N.H.Williams
- Gomesa deuteroregentii J.M.H.Shaw
- Gomesa diamantinensis (V.P.Castro) J.M.H.Shaw
- Gomesa discifera (Lindl.) M.W.Chase & N.H.Williams
- Gomesa divaricata Hoffmanns.
- Gomesa doeringii (Hoehne) Pabst
- Gomesa doniana (Bateman ex W.H.Baxter) M.W.Chase & N.H.Williams
- Gomesa duseniana Kraenzl.
- Gomesa echinata (Barb.Rodr.) M.W.Chase & N.H.Williams
- Gomesa edmundoi (Pabst) M.W.Chase & N.H.Williams
- Gomesa eleutherosepala (Barb.Rodr.) M.W.Chase & N.H.Williams
- Gomesa emiliana H.Barbosa
- Gomesa emilii (Schltr.) M.W.Chase & N.H.Williams
- Gomesa fischeri Regel
- Gomesa flexuosa (G.Lodd.) M.W.Chase & N.H.Williams
- Gomesa florida (Vell.) Meneguzzo
- Gomesa foliosa (Hook.) Klotzsch ex Rchb.f.
- Gomesa forbesii (Hook.) M.W.Chase & N.H.Williams
- Gomesa fuscans (Rchb.f.) M.W.Chase & N.H.Williams
- Gomesa fuscopetala (Hoehne) M.W.Chase & N.H.Williams
- Gomesa gardneri (Lindl.) M.W.Chase & N.H.Williams
- Gomesa glaziovii Cogn.
- Gomesa gomezoides (Barb.Rodr.) Pabst
- Gomesa gracilis (Lindl.) M.W.Chase & N.H.Williams
- Gomesa gravesiana (Rolfe) M.W.Chase & N.H.Williams
- Gomesa gutfreundiana (Chiron & V.P.Castro) M.W.Chase & N.H.Williams
- Gomesa handroi (Hoehne) Pabst
- Gomesa herzogii (Schltr.) Lückel
- Gomesa hookeri (Rolfe) M.W.Chase & N.H.Williams
- Gomesa hydrophila (Barb.Rodr.) M.W.Chase & N.H.Williams
- Gomesa imperatoris-maximiliani (Rchb.f.) M.W.Chase & N.H.Williams
- Gomesa insignis (Rolfe) M.W.Chase & N.H.Williams
- Gomesa itapetingensis (V.P.Castro & Chiron) M.W.Chase & N.H.Williams
- Gomesa jucunda (Rchb.f.) M.W.Chase & N.H.Williams
- Gomesa kautskyi (Pabst) M.W.Chase & N.H.Williams
- Gomesa kleinii Szlach., Chiron & Kolan.
- Gomesa leinigii (Pabst) M.W.Chase & N.H.Williams
- Gomesa lietzei (Regel) M.W.Chase & N.H.Williams
- Gomesa loefgrenii (Cogn.) M.W.Chase & N.H.Williams
- Gomesa longipes (Lindl.) M.W.Chase & N.H.Williams
- Gomesa macropetala (Lindl.) M.W.Chase & N.H.Williams
- Gomesa maculosa (Lindl.) Meneguzzo
- Gomesa majevskyae (Toscano & V.P.Castro) M.W.Chase & N.H.Williams
- Gomesa mantiqueirensis (Campacci) J.M.H.Shaw
- Gomesa marshalliana (Rchb.f.) M.W.Chase & N.H.Williams
- Gomesa martiana (Lindl.) M.W.Chase & N.H.Williams
- Gomesa messmeriana (Campacci) Laitano
- Gomesa meyerae (V.P.Castro & P.Blaha) J.M.H.Shaw
- Gomesa microphyta (Barb.Rodr.) M.W.Chase & N.H.Williams
- Gomesa micropogon (Rchb.f.) M.W.Chase & N.H.Williams
- Gomesa neoparanaensis M.W.Chase & N.H.Williams
- Gomesa nitida (Barb.Rodr.) M.W.Chase & N.H.Williams
- Gomesa novaesiae (Ruschi) Fraga & A.P.Fontana
- Gomesa ottonis (Schltr.) J.M.H.Shaw & M.Giannak.
- Gomesa ouricanensis (V.P.Castro & Campacci) M.W.Chase & N.H.Williams
- Gomesa pabstii (Campacci & C.Espejo) M.W.Chase & N.H.Williams
- Gomesa paranaensis Kraenzl.
- Gomesa paranapiacabensis (Hoehne) M.W.Chase & N.H.Williams
- Gomesa paranensoides M.W.Chase & N.H.Williams
- Gomesa pardoglossa (Rchb.f.) M.W.Chase & N.H.Williams
- Gomesa pectoralis (Lindl.) M.W.Chase & N.H.Williams
- Gomesa petropolitana (Pabst) M.W.Chase & N.H.Williams
- Gomesa planifolia (Lindl.) Klotzsch ex Rchb.f.
- Gomesa polyodonta (Kraenzl.) Meneguzzo
- Gomesa praetexta (Rchb.f.) M.W.Chase & N.H.Williams
- Gomesa pubes (Lindl.) M.W.Chase & N.H.Williams
- Gomesa pulchella (Regel) M.W.Chase & N.H.Williams
- Gomesa radicans (Rchb.f.) M.W.Chase & N.H.Williams
- Gomesa ramosa (Lindl.) M.W.Chase & N.H.Williams
- Gomesa ranifera (Lindl.) M.W.Chase & N.H.Williams
- Gomesa recurva R.Br.
- Gomesa reducta (Kraenzl.) M.W.Chase & N.H.Williams
- Gomesa reichertii (L.C.Menezes & V.P.Castro) M.W.Chase & N.H.Williams
- Gomesa riograndensis (Cogn.) M.W.Chase & N.H.Williams
- Gomesa riviereana (Wibier) M.W.Chase & N.H.Williams
- Gomesa rupestris (Docha Neto) Lückel
- Gomesa salesopolitana (V.P.Castro & Chiron) M.W.Chase & N.H.Williams
- Gomesa sarcodes (Lindl.) M.W.Chase & N.H.Williams
- Gomesa sellowii (Cogn.) M.W.Chase & N.H.Williams
- Gomesa sessilis Barb.Rodr.
- Gomesa silvana (V.P.Castro & Campacci) M.W.Chase & N.H.Williams
- Gomesa sincorana (Campacci & Cath.) M.W.Chase & N.H.Williams
- Gomesa tapiraiensis (Campacci) J.M.H.Shaw
- Gomesa ternata (Vell.) Campacci
- Gomesa uhlii (Chiron & V.P.Castro) M.W.Chase & N.H.Williams
- Gomesa uniflora (Booth ex Lindl.) M.W.Chase & N.H.Williams
- Gomesa varicosa (Lindl.) M.W.Chase & N.H.Williams
- Gomesa vasconcelosiana (Campacci) J.M.H.Shaw
- Gomesa velteniana (V.P.Castro & Chiron) M.W.Chase & N.H.Williams
- Gomesa venusta (Drapiez) M.W.Chase & N.H.Williams
- Gomesa viperina (Lindl.) M.W.Chase & N.H.Williams
- Gomesa warmingii (Rchb.f.) M.W.Chase & N.H.Williams
- Gomesa welteri (Pabst) M.W.Chase & N.H.Williams
- Gomesa widgrenii (Lindl.) M.W.Chase & N.H.Williams
- Gomesa williamsii (Schltr.) M.W.Chase & N.H.Williams

=== Natural hybrids ===
- Gomesa × amicta (Lindl.) M.W.Chase & N.H.Williams = Gomes lietzei × Gomesa sarcodes
- Gomesa × colnagoi (Pabst) M.W.Chase & N.H.Williams = Gomesa forbesii × Gomesa zappii
- Gomesa × francacesari (Campacci) J.M.H.Shaw
- Gomesa × lita (Rchb.f.) M.W.Chase & N.H.Williams = Gomes forbesii × Gomesa imperatoris-maximiliani
- Gomesa × roczonii (Leinig) Meneguzzo
- Gomesa × scullyi (Pabst & A.F.Mello) M.W.Chase & N.H.Williams = Gomes gardneri × Gomesa gravesiana
- Gomesa × stanleyi (Rolfe) J.M.H.Shaw
- Gomesa × terassaniana (Campacci) J.M.H.Shaw = Gomes blanchetii × Gomesa sarcodes

== See also ==
- List of Orchidaceae genera
