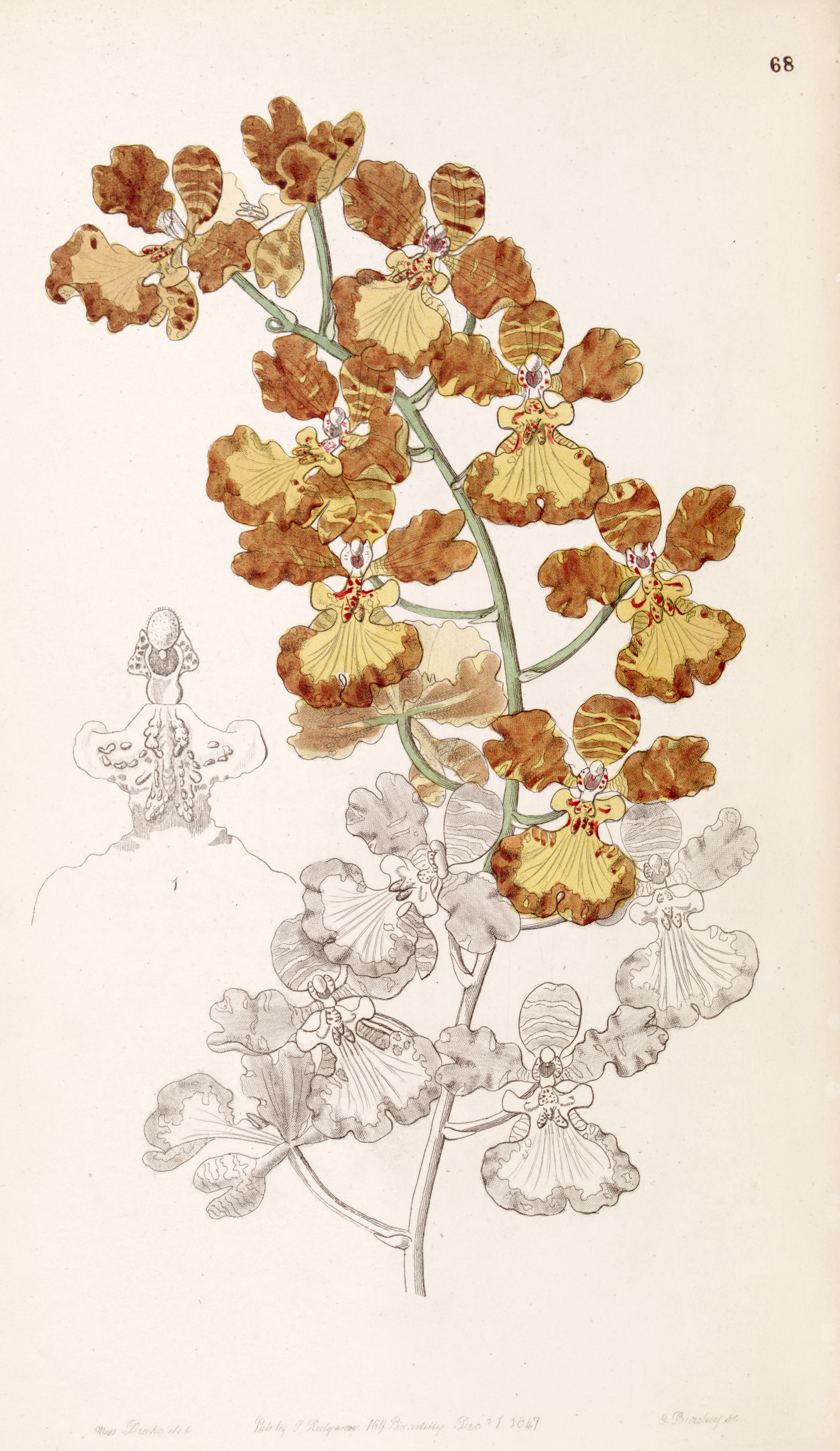

Scientific classification
- Kingdom: Plantae
- Clade: Tracheophytes
- Clade: Angiosperms
- Clade: Monocots
- Order: Asparagales
- Family: Orchidaceae
- Subfamily: Epidendroideae
- Genus: Gomesa
- Species: G. gardneri

Binomial name
- Gomesa gardneri (Lindl.) M.W.Chase & N.H.Williams

Synonyms
- See text

= Gomesa gardneri =

Species of orchid

Gomesa gardneri is a species of orchid native to southern and southeastern Brazil. It was formerly within the genus Oncidium until a phylogenetic study published in 2009 transferred it and some other Oncidium species to Gomesa.

== Synonyms ==
Selected from Plants of the World Online.

- Oncidium gardneri Lindl.
- Oncidium curtum Lindl.
- Oncidium flabelliferum Pinel
- Oncidium elegantissimum Rchb.f.
- Oncidium gardnerianum auct.
- Oncidium praestans Rchb.f.
- Oncidium brunnipetalum Barb.Rodr.
- Oncidium caloglossum Rchb.f.
- Oncidium pollettianum Rchb.f.
- Oncidium larkinianum Gower
- Oncidium wheatleyanum Gower
- Oncidium gardneri var. elegantissimum (Rchb.f.) Cogn.
- Oncidium gardneri var. pollettianum (Rchb.f.) Cogn.
- Oncidium gardneri var. praestans (Rchb.f.) Cogn.
- Oncidium pectorale var. caloglossum (Rchb.f.) Cogn.
- Oncidium pectorale var. larkinianum (Gower) Cogn.
- Oncidium gardneri subsp. caloglossum (Rchb.f.) Fowlie
- Ampliglossum brunnipetalum (Barb.Rodr.) Campacci
- Brasilidium curtum (Lindl.) Campacci, Colet.
- Brasilidium gardneri (Lindl.) Campacci, Colet.
- Coppensia brunnipetala (Barb.Rodr.) Campacci
