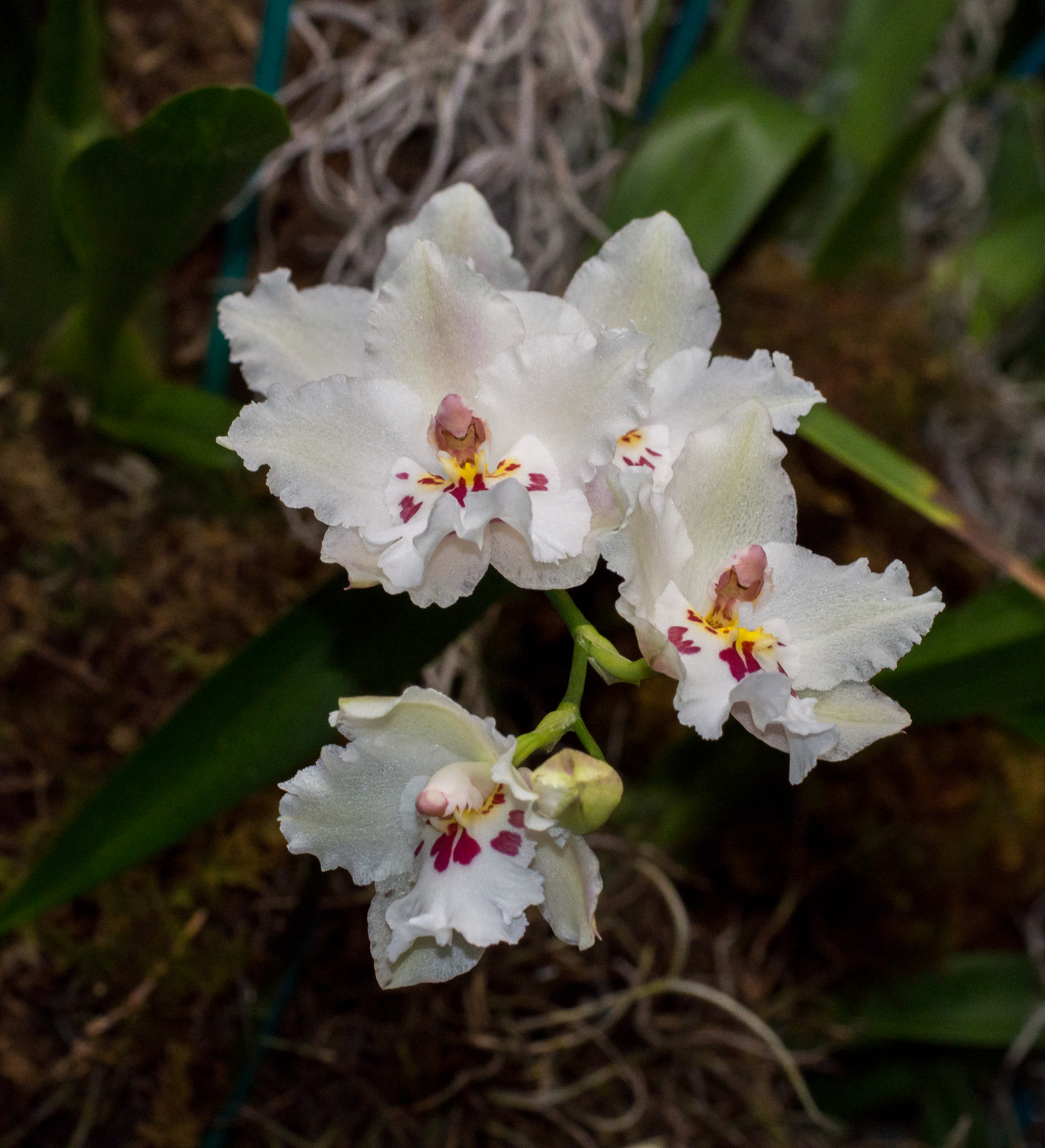
- × Miltonidium at the New York Botanical Garden

Scientific classification
- Kingdom: Plantae
- Clade: Tracheophytes
- Clade: Angiosperms
- Clade: Monocots
- Order: Asparagales
- Family: Orchidaceae
- Subfamily: Epidendroideae
- Tribe: Cymbidieae
- Subtribe: Oncidiinae
- Genus: × Miltonidium hort.

= × Miltonidium =

Genus of orchids

× Miltonidium, abbreviated as Mtdm. in the horticultural trade, is the nothogenus for hybrids between the orchid genera Miltonia and Oncidium (Milt. × Onc.). An example is Miltonidium Purple Sunset, which is a hybrid of Miltonia Victoria and Oncidium hastilabium.

When Cochlioda and Odontoglossum are sunk into Oncidium, and other parents remain in Miltonia, × Burrageara, × Colmanara, × Odontonia and × Vuylstekeara become synonyms.

== Taxonomy ==
The nothogenus (hybrid genus) name × Miltonidium was first published in 1936, for hybrids between Miltonia and Oncidium. The first hybrid registered in this nothogenus was × Miltonidium Aristocrat in 1940. As of December 2023, both of its parents were placed in Oncidium so the correct name of the grex became Oncidium Aristocrat.

Other changes to the circumscription of the genus Oncidium have caused changes to the nomenclature of nothogenera. The genus Gomesa has been split off from Oncidium. Several grexes formerly treated as Miltonia × Oncidium and so placed in × Miltonidium have now become Gomesa × Miltonia = × Gomonia. For example, Gomonia Mateus Pomini Uel, generated from Miltonia regnellii × Gomesa imperatoris-maximiliani, two native Brazilian orchids, was placed in × Miltonidium when Gomesa imperatoris-maximiliani was known by its synonym Oncidium imperatoris-maximiliani.

As of December 2023, Plants of the World Online sank Cochlioda and Odontoglossum within Oncidium. Some other nothogenera then become synonyms of × Miltonidium.

=== × Burrageara ===
× Burrageara, abbreviated Burr. in the horticultural trade, was the nothogenus for hybrids between the orchid genera Cochlioda, Miltonia, Odontoglossum and Oncidium. It was grown for the first time by the American Albert Burrage in 1927, and named after him. When Cochlioda and Odontoglossum are synonymized with Oncidium, the parents of × Burrageara become just Miltonia and Oncidium. For example, the grex name × Burrageara Helen Kelley is a synonym of × Miltonidium Helen Kelley. Its parents include Oncidium hastatum and Oncidium noezlianum, previously placed in Odontoglossum and Cochlioda respectively.

Some species of the original Miltonia now belong to Miltoniopsis. Hybrids placed in × Burrageara because the parents included species then placed in Miltonia should be placed in x Oncidopsis (Miltoniopsis x Oncidium).

=== × Colmanara ===
× Colmanara, abbreviated Colm. in the horticultural trade, was the nothogenus for hybrids between three the orchid genera Miltonia, Odontoglossum and Oncidium. The name Colmanara refers to Jeremiah Colman (1859–1942), an English collector of orchids. As of April 2026, Odontoglossum was treated as a synonym of Oncidium, so that plants correctly treated formerly as × Colmanara fall within × Miltonidium.

=== × Odontonia ===
× Odontonia, abbreviated as Odtna. in the horticultural trade, was the nothogenus for hybrids between the two orchid genera Miltonia and Odontoglossum. As of April 2026, Odontoglossum was treated as a synonym of Oncidium, so that plants correctly treated formerly as × Odontonia fall within × Miltonidium. Many hybrids placed in × Odontonia were actually made with Miltoniopsis.

× Miltonidium Candy Harry is a hybrid between Miltonia candida and Oncidium harryanum. The latter was previously known as Odontoglossum harryanum, so the hybrid was known by the synonym × Odontonia Candy Harry.
