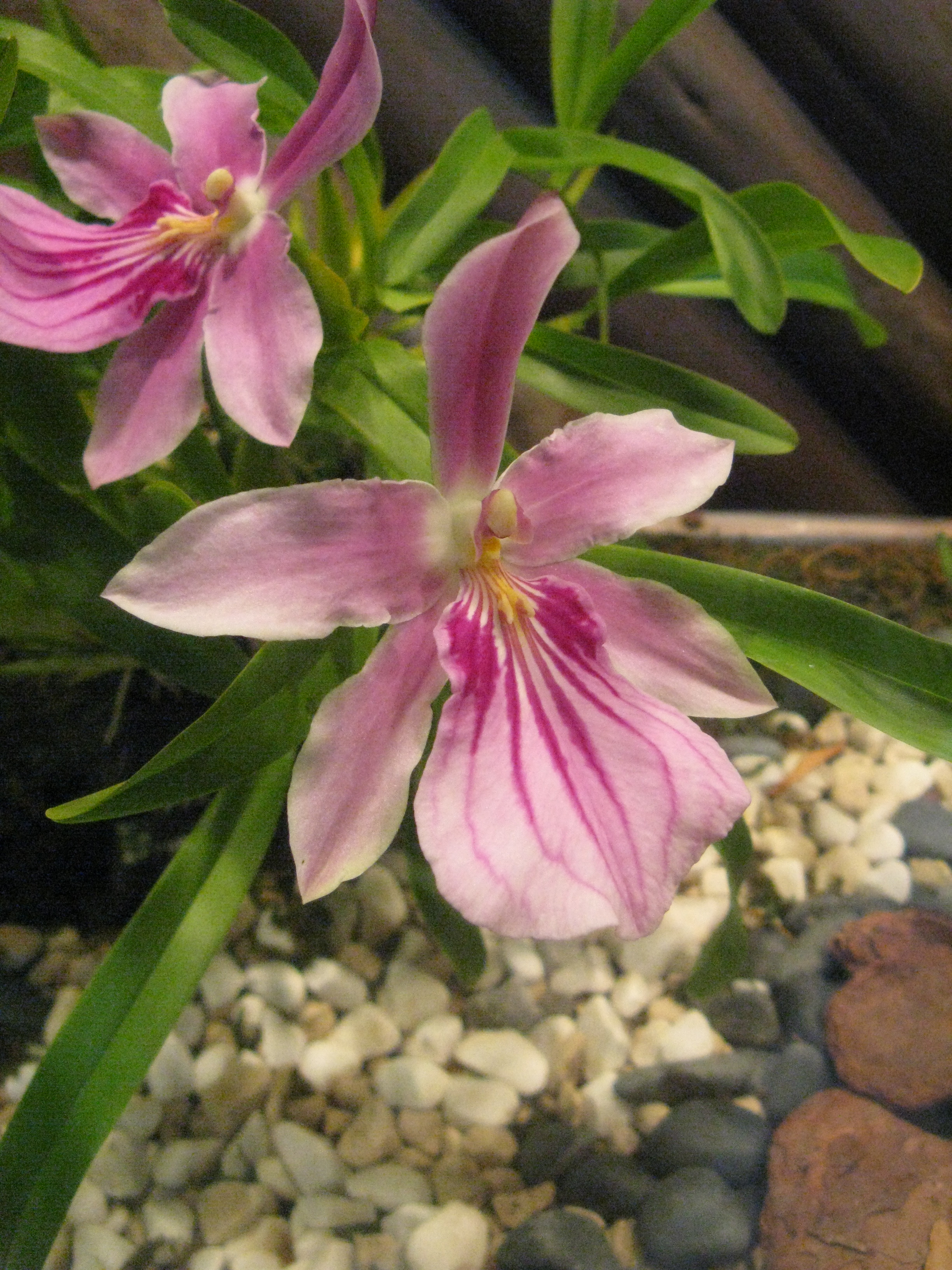

Scientific classification
- Kingdom: Plantae
- Clade: Tracheophytes
- Clade: Angiosperms
- Clade: Monocots
- Order: Asparagales
- Family: Orchidaceae
- Subfamily: Epidendroideae
- Genus: Miltonia
- Species: M. spectabilis

Binomial name
- Miltonia spectabilis Lindl.

Synonyms
- Oncidium spectabile (Lindl.) Beer; Macrochilus fryanus Knowles & Westc.; Miltonia spectabilis var. porphyroglossa Rchb.f.; Miltonia spectabilis var. radians Rchb.f.; Miltonia spectabilis var. rosea auct.; Miltonia spectabilis var. virginalis Lem.; Miltonia bicolor Lodd. ex Buyss.; Miltonia spectabilis var. aspersa Rchb.f.; Miltonia spectabilis var. bicolor G.Nicholson; Miltonia spectabilis var. lineata L.Linden & Rodigas

= Miltonia spectabilis =

Outstanding miltonia

Species of orchid

Miltonia spectabilis, the outstanding miltonia, is a species of orchid occurring in extreme eastern Brazil and has been erroneously reported to occur in Venezuela. It is the type species of the genus Miltonia.
