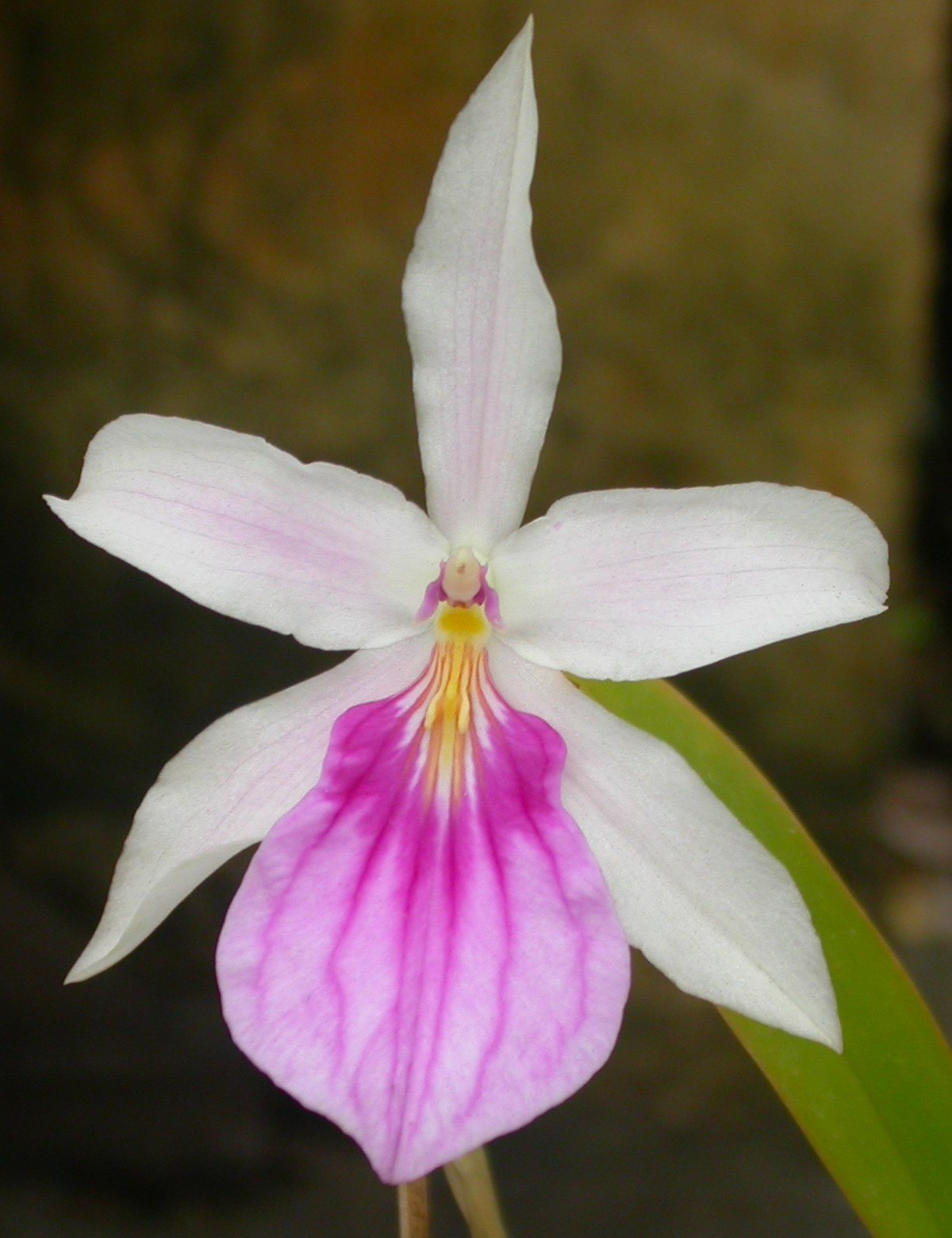
- Miltonia spectabilis

Scientific classification
- Kingdom: Plantae
- Clade: Tracheophytes
- Clade: Angiosperms
- Clade: Monocots
- Order: Asparagales
- Family: Orchidaceae
- Subfamily: Epidendroideae
- Tribe: Cymbidieae
- Subtribe: Oncidiinae
- Genus: Miltonia; Lindl. (1837)

Type species
- Miltonia spectabilis Lindl.

Species
- See text.

Synonyms
- Anneliesia Brieger & Lückel; Gynizodon Raf.; Macrochilus Knowles & Westc.; Phymatochilum Christenson

= Miltonia =

Genus of orchids

Miltonia, abbreviated Milt. in the horticultural trade, is an orchid genus comprising twelve epiphyte species and eight natural hybrids. The miltonias are exclusively inhabitants of Brazil, except for one species whose range extends from Brazil into the northeast of Argentina and the east of Paraguay.

The genus of Miltonia was established by John Lindley in 1837, when he described its type species, Miltonia spectabilis. Formerly many more species were attributed to Miltonia, however, beginning in 1978, the miltonias from Central America and from cooler areas of northwest South America have been moved to other genera, including Miltoniopsis and Oncidium, and these changes are still in the process of being accepted by the horticultural trade.

Miltonia species have large and long lasting flowers, often in multifloral inflorescences. This fact, allied to being species that are easy to grow and to identify, make them a favorite of orchid collectors all over the world. Species of this genus are extensively used to produce artificial hybrids.

Despite the fact that Miltonia is now a well established genus, most of its species were originally classified under other genera as Cyrtochilum, Oncidium, Odontoglossum, and Brassia. All were discovered between 1834 and 1850 with the exception of M. kayasimae, discovered only in 1976.

These orchids have two leaves, arising from a pseudobulb, covered with a foliaceous sheath. The inflorescence consists of waxy, nonspurred flowers. The lip is large and flat and lacks a callus at its base. They possess a footless column with two hard pollinia. The flowers have a delicate, exotic scent, some compare to that of roses.

They are named after Charles Wentworth-Fitzwilliam, 5th Earl Fitzwilliam, formerly Viscount Milton, an English aristocrat, politician, patron of science and horticulture, and orchid enthusiast.

The species in this genus are sometimes referred to as the pansy orchids, but it is the Miltoniopsis orchids that have flowers that closely resemble the pansy. Almost everyone except for the most serious orchid hobbyists uses the name pansy orchids interchangeably, which may cause confusion.

Miltonia looks more like Oncidiums than the other pansy orchids. The most "pansy-like" a Miltonia can get is the species Miltonia spectabilis. Taxonomists are debating whether to combine Miltonia with the genus Oncidium because of the many connections between the two.

Miltoniopsis is the pansy orchid with huge showy flowers. They grow in cooler climates and are more challenging to grow than Miltonia.

This genus forms with Miltoniopsis a hybrid genus ×Milmiltonia J.M.H.Shaw.

== Description ==
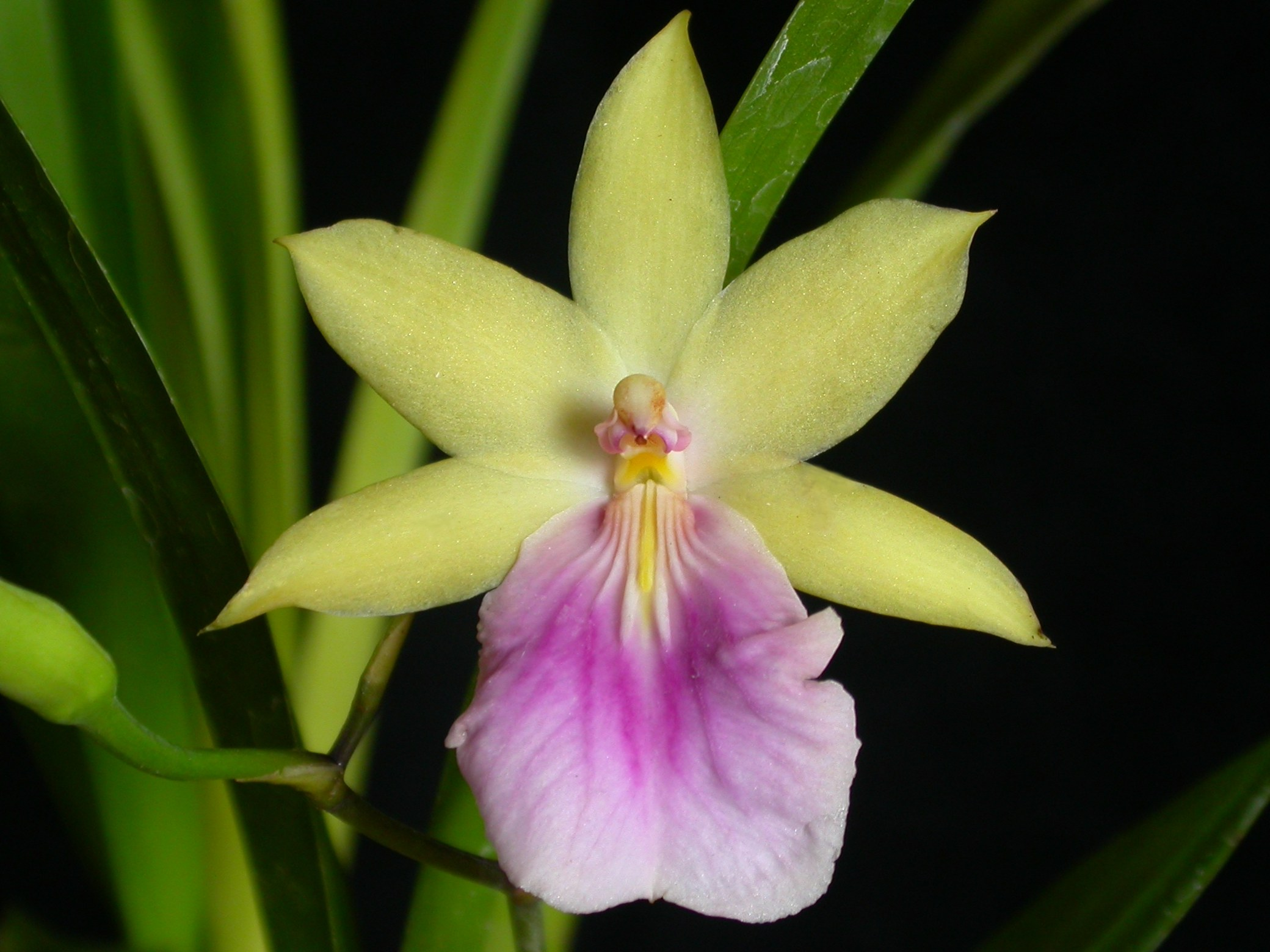
Miltonia regnellii This species shows the widest flower color variation among Miltonia species; they can vary from white to yellow, pink and lilac with labelli also from white to dark purple.

Miltonia are comparatively medium large orchid plants reaching about fifty centimeters height. They present subcaespitous growth, that means their pseudobulbs are not tightly packed but slightly spaced by a rhizome, that is longer than on caespitous plants, with length between two and five centimeters. Their roots grow along the rhizome in high numbers. They are white, comparatively thin, usually short and hardly branched. The rhizome is covered by dried imbricating steaths which get increasingly larger at the base of pseudobulb becoming articulated foliar steaths that partially cover them. The pseudobulbs and leaves vary in color from yellowish bright light green to olive green depending on the species and to the amount of sunlight they are exposed to. They may be more oval and laterally highly flattened to slightly tetragonal and elongated and almost always bear two apical leaves. The leaves are narrow, flexible and hardly larger than three centimeters wide and forty long with the apexes rounded sometimes slightly pointed. Some species are about half of this size. The inflorescences are one or two per pseudobulb, shoot from their bases behind the protecting steaths. They are erect and never branched, often longer than the leaves, bearing from one to twelve moderately spaced flowers that open at the same time or in succession holding three or four opened all the time, when the older fades a new one opens. The older flowers of species with white lips that open in succession usually get yellower about the time the next flower opens although they still last one more week before fading. The first to bloom is M. cuneata, during late winter, but the majority of species bloom from late spring to late summer.

The flowers of Miltonia vary from four to fifteen centimeters across; the larger are the ones with fewer flowers. Their colors vary from entirely white and pink to dark purple, pale yellow or lilac when plain, or they may highly spotted but then usually they are greenish or brownish with a contrasting labellum often white with purple dots, stains or veins close to the base. The petals and sepals shapes are highly variable from species to species but always somewhat similar to each other within a species. They may be erect and flat or sometimes less open. The labellum is simple or very slightly lobed, usually very wide and showy without salient calli although normally showing more or less subtle keeled thickenings close to the base, usually of different colors; it is much larger and wider than the other segments, often flat but in M. candida embraces the column and in all species it is slightly fused to the column at their bases. The short column does not have a foot and presents two lateral auricles sometimes merged to each other through a fringe that surrounds the superior edge of the clinandrium. The anther is apical and bears two yellow hard pollinia. They possibly are pollinated by bees.

== Taxonomy ==
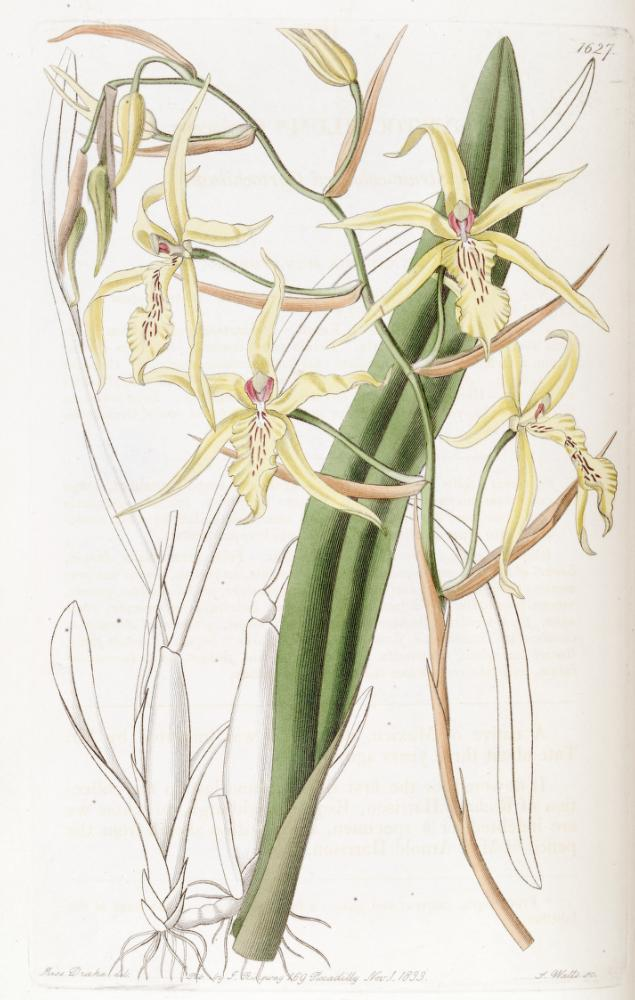
Miltonia flavescens, illustration. This was the first Miltonia species to be described, originally classified under the genus Cyrtochilum, in 1834.

The first species to be described, among the ones today classified under the genus Miltonia, was originally published by John Lindley, in 1834, as Cyrtochilum flavescens. In this description Lindley notices that the flowers of this species turn orange color when drying and, for some confusion regarding the origin of the species, attributes it to Mexico instead of Brazil. Two years later Lindley described another Miltonia species but, then, under the genus Oncidium, as O. russellianum in homage to Duke of Bedford. When describing this plant, Lindley considered it as a transition species pointing out that it was very different from the average Oncidium because of its purple colors and undivided lip.

In 1837, Lindley received from Mr. Loddiges and from George Baker two other specimens of a very distinctive new species. Recognizing then this should in fact be a new genus, he proposed the name Miltonia to it as a homage to Charles Wentworth-Fitzwilliam, 5th Earl Fitzwilliam, formerly Viscount Milton, an English orchid enthusiast. Lindley states then that the limits between a number of Oncidiinae genera, Cyrtochilum, Oncidium, Odontoglossum, Brassia and Miltonia, at that time classified as Vandaea, were yet to be perfectly established; although closely related, the differences should possibly be: Oncidium has a column with two ears and labellum distinctively lobed; Miltonia has a column with two ears and an entire labellum partially united to the column base; Odontoglossum and Cyrtochilum have winged columns and entire labelli but the former has it partially united to the column; and Brassia does not have any appendages on the column. Although Lindley described the genus Aspasia (which is the most closely related to Miltonia) in 1833, both by flower and vegetative morphologies, he did not mention it on his Miltonia description.

Three other botanists were working with Miltonia species around the time Lindley described this genus. All recognized these plants should be classified under a new genus and, as communications were slower then, all proposed new genera: Knowles and Westcott also received also a plant of M. spectabilis and, just one month after Lindley, proposed for it the genus Macrochilus, calling the species Macrochilus fryanus; the other one was Rafinescque who, in 1838, decided that the Oncidium russellianum already described by Lindley in 1836 should be under another genus and created for it the genus Gynizodon. Both Macrochilus and Gynizodon are synonyms of Miltonia and no other species has ever been submitted to them.

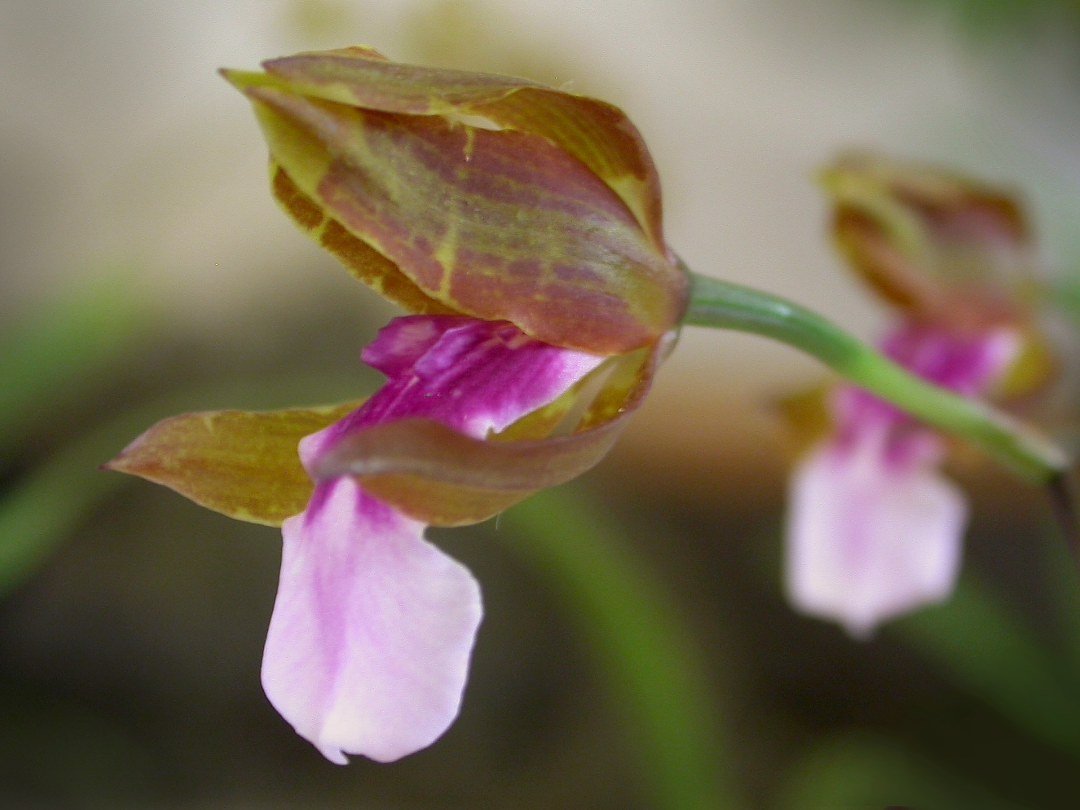
Miltonia russelliana This is the less showy of Miltonia species because its sepals and petals do not really open, being always bent over the column, revealing only the lighter tip of its purple labellum.

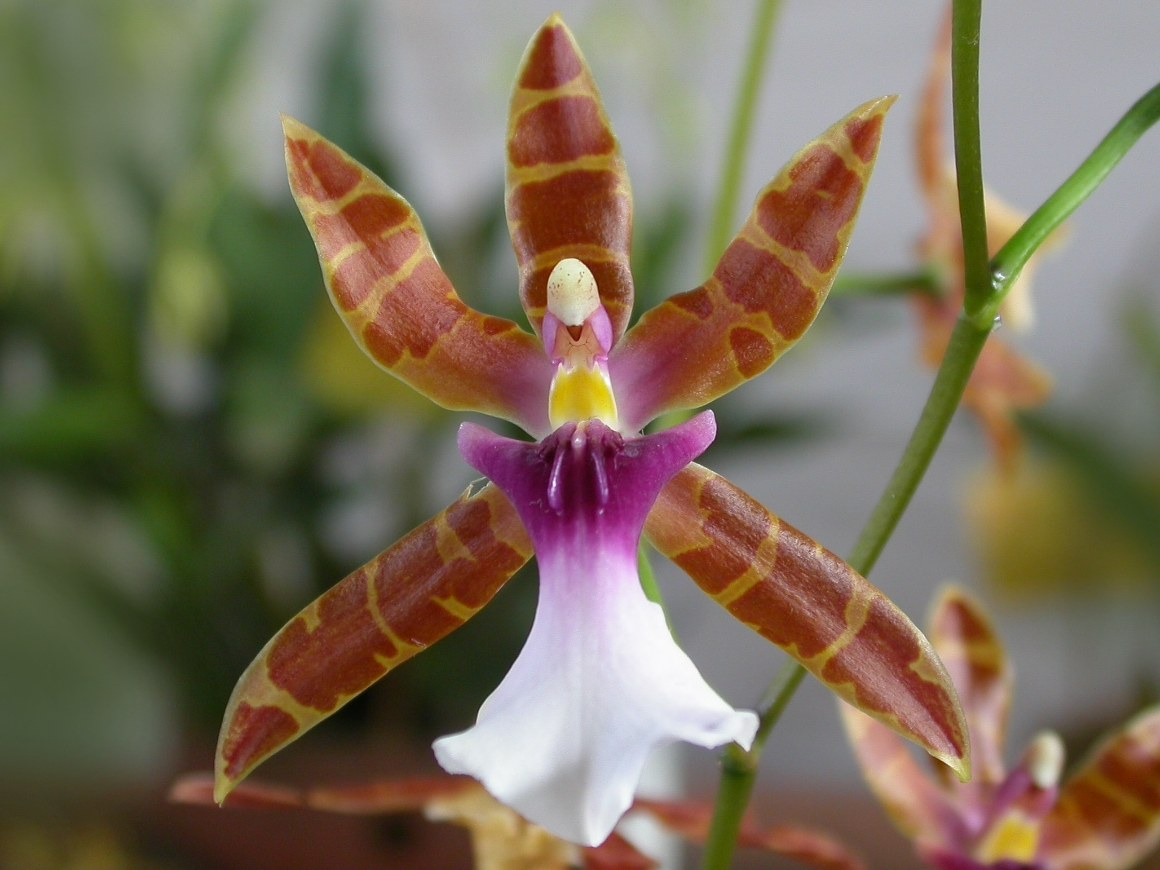
Miltonia clowesii This species has the same color pattern of M. russelliana, however, with a whiter labellum. On the other hand, M. clowesii flowers pointed segments are larger and wide opened making it look like a spider.

As Miltonia species are common plants, comparatively large, with also large flowers of bright colors, that, moreover, are spread mostly over an area of early settlements in Brazil all species but one were already described in 1850; six of them by Lindley, M. regnellii by Reichenbach and M. moreliana by Achille Richard. Despite the early description of M. moreliana in 1848, and two other as M. rosea by Lemaire in 1867, and as M. warneri by George Nicholson in 1886, Arthur Henfrey reduced it to a variety of Miltonia spectabilis in 1851, and as such it was considered until 2002, when Cássio van den Berg reestablished it as a distinct species. The last Miltonia species to be discovered was M. kayasimae, found by an orchid collector not far from the city of São Paulo, in an area around nine hundred meters of altitude nearby the top of Serra do Mar mountains. It was named after their collector by Guido Pabst in 1976. So far very few plants were found, all living at the same area.

Since the genus Miltonia was established, many species, now classified under a number of other genera, were submitted to it. The most noticeable cases were four of the five species of Miltoniopsis, a genus proposed in 1889 but only really accepted in 1976. Despite its somewhat similar flowers, Miltoniopsis are from cooler forests on the Andean slopes closely related to Cyrtochilum and only remotely related to Miltonia. Also five of the six Miltonioides species were occasionally considered as Miltonia until 1983 when Brieger and Lückel proposed this genus for them. These are species of more delicate and narrower flowers, from Mexico and Central America, which some taxonomists claim might be better classified under the genus Oncidium to whom they are closely related. The last common species which was occasionally classified under Miltonia is Chamaeleorchis warszewiczii, which is related to Oncidium and some taxonomists identify as Oncidium fuscatum.

In 1983, Brieger and Lueckel, considering that four species of Miltonia, M. candida, M. cuneata, M. kayasimae and M. russelliana, show the junction of the labellum with the column in a different angle than the other species, proposed the genus Anneliesia for them. Although this four species form a small sister clade to the rest of Miltonia species, the difference did not seem important enough to justify the acceptance of this new genus, therefore this proposal has not been generally accepted by the scientific community.

In 2001, based on molecular analysis, Norris Williams and Mark Chase, transferred a species previously classified under the genus Oncidium, as O. phymatochilum, to Miltonia. As this species shows a morphology that closer to Oncidium species than to Miltonia, because of its small yellowish flowers and highly branched inflorescence, this result and following transfer was a great surprise to most taxonomists. In 2005, Eric Christenson suggested a new genus and the name Phymatochilum brasiliense for it. As of December 2023, Plants of the World Online accepts the species as Miltonia phymatochila.

Molecular analysis show that Miltonia most closely related genera are Aspasia, Brassia and Ada, which are the most important genera included in this that is one of the eight clades that form the subtribus Oncidiinae of tribus Cymbidieae.

=== Species ===
As of December 2023, Plants of the World Online accepted the following species:

- Miltonia altairiana Chiron & V.P.Castro
- Miltonia × binotii Cogn.
- Miltonia × bluntii Rchb.f.
- Miltonia candida Lindl.
- Miltonia clowesii (Lindl.) Lindl.
- Miltonia × cogniauxiae Peeters ex Cogn. & A.Gooss.
- Miltonia cuneata Lindl.
- Miltonia × cyrtochiloides Barb.Rodr.
- Miltonia flava Lindl.
- Miltonia flavescens (Lindl.) Lindl.
- Miltonia kayasimae Pabst
- Miltonia × lamarckeana Rchb.f.
- Miltonia × leucoglossa Anon.
- Miltonia moreliana A.Rich.
- Miltonia × peetersiana Rchb.f.
- Miltonia phymatochila (Lindl.) N.H.Williams & M.W.Chase
- Miltonia regnellii Rchb.f.
- Miltonia × rosina Barb.Rodr.
- Miltonia russelliana (Lindl.) Lindl.
- Miltonia spectabilis Lindl.

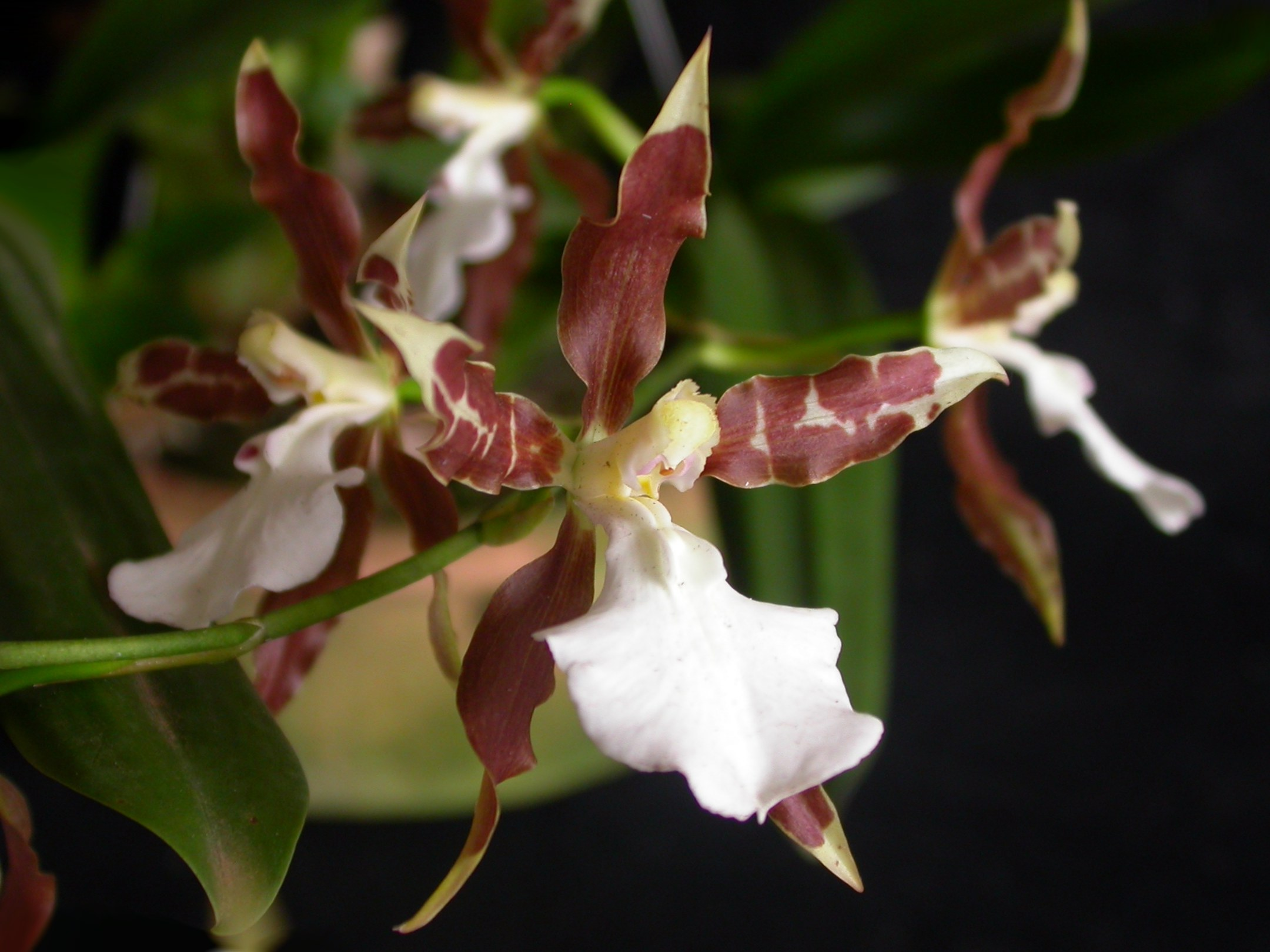
Miltonia cuneata This is the hardest to grow among all Miltonia species, however, as all the others are very easy, this one is not really difficult. This is the one species that needs cooler conditions.

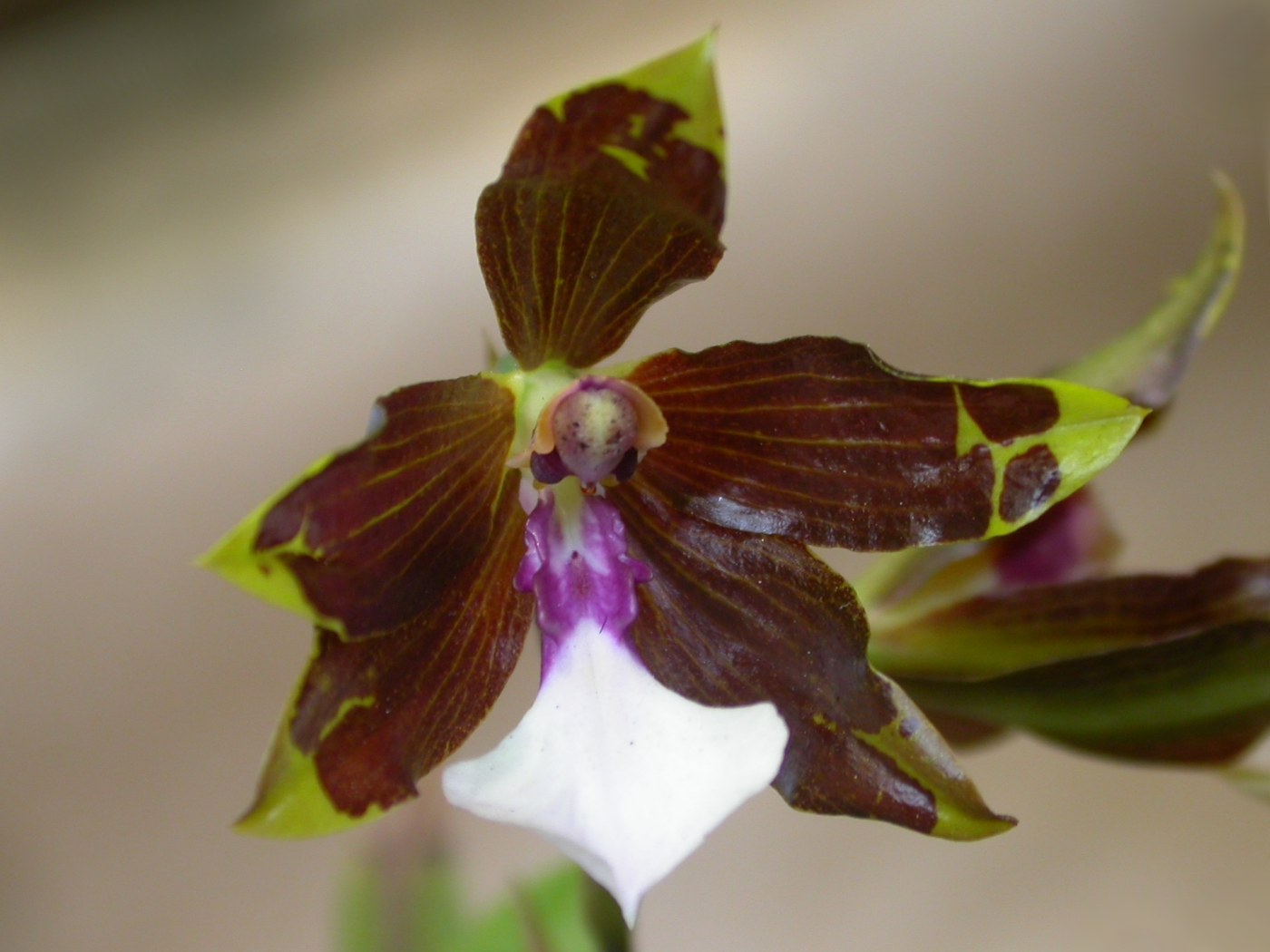
Miltonia kayasimae This was the last species to be described and is the rarest one, having been found just a couple of times in São Paulo State, in Brazil.

The species of Miltonia show many differences to each other are very easy to identify, therefore, just the most evident differences are mentioned here; more details are given on individual species articles. The species are presented here according to their morphology and this order keeps no correspondence with phylogenetic relationships.

Regarding vegetative morphology Miltonia moreliana and Miltonia spectabilis can be immediately separated from the rest because their much flatter pseudobulbs, longer rhizome and inflorescences completely covered by flattened bracts that bear only one highly flat flower. These are the species with largest flowers in the genus. They are closely related and usually are recognized because the flowers of M. moreliana usually have dark purple petals and sepals and the lip of a lighter bright purple while M. spectabilis has very light purple or white petals and sepals and a purple veined labellum, however, the real technical difference among the species is on the proportions of their segments which are much wider. Despite colors are often mentioned to identify species they are not accepted by taxonomy as enough to establish distinct species by themselves. All other Miltonia species have similar vegetative appearance and only can be positively identified by their flowers.

Three species are unique: Miltonia flavescens has the most narrow flowers, almost star shaped, with all segments of straw color with some purple bots on the base of petals and sepals which are more intense on the labellum almost forming stripes; Miltonia candida is the only species with a labellum that embraces the column in a way that reminds the Cattleya species; Miltonia russelliana is the less showy of Miltonia species because its sepals and petals do not really open, being always bent over the column, revealing only the lighter tip of its purple labellum.

Miltonia regnellii shows the widest flower color variation among all Miltonia species; they can vary from white to yellow, pink and lilac with labelli also varying from white to dark purple. The flowers open in succession and slightly resemble the ones of M. spectabilis although much smaller. They actually are the Miltonia species with the smallest flowers.

Miltonia kayasimae and Miltonia cuneata are somewhat similar and possibly are closely related, both have straw color petals and sepals almost entirely covered by large brown stains and white labelli, however, they show different proportions on the flowers segments. M. kayasimae has much wider petals and sepals and smaller labellum which, moreover, has a larger and more salient and complex entirely purple callus on its base which is delicate, more straight and simple, and just occasionally purple dotted on its apex on M. cuneata.

Miltonia clowesii has the same color pattern of M. russelliana with light yellow greenish brown sepals and petals completely covered with large darker dots or stains and labellum of bright purple at the base and lighter apex, however here they are whiter. On the other hand, M. clowesii flowers' pointed segments are larger and wide opened making it resemble a spider.

=== Natural hybrids ===
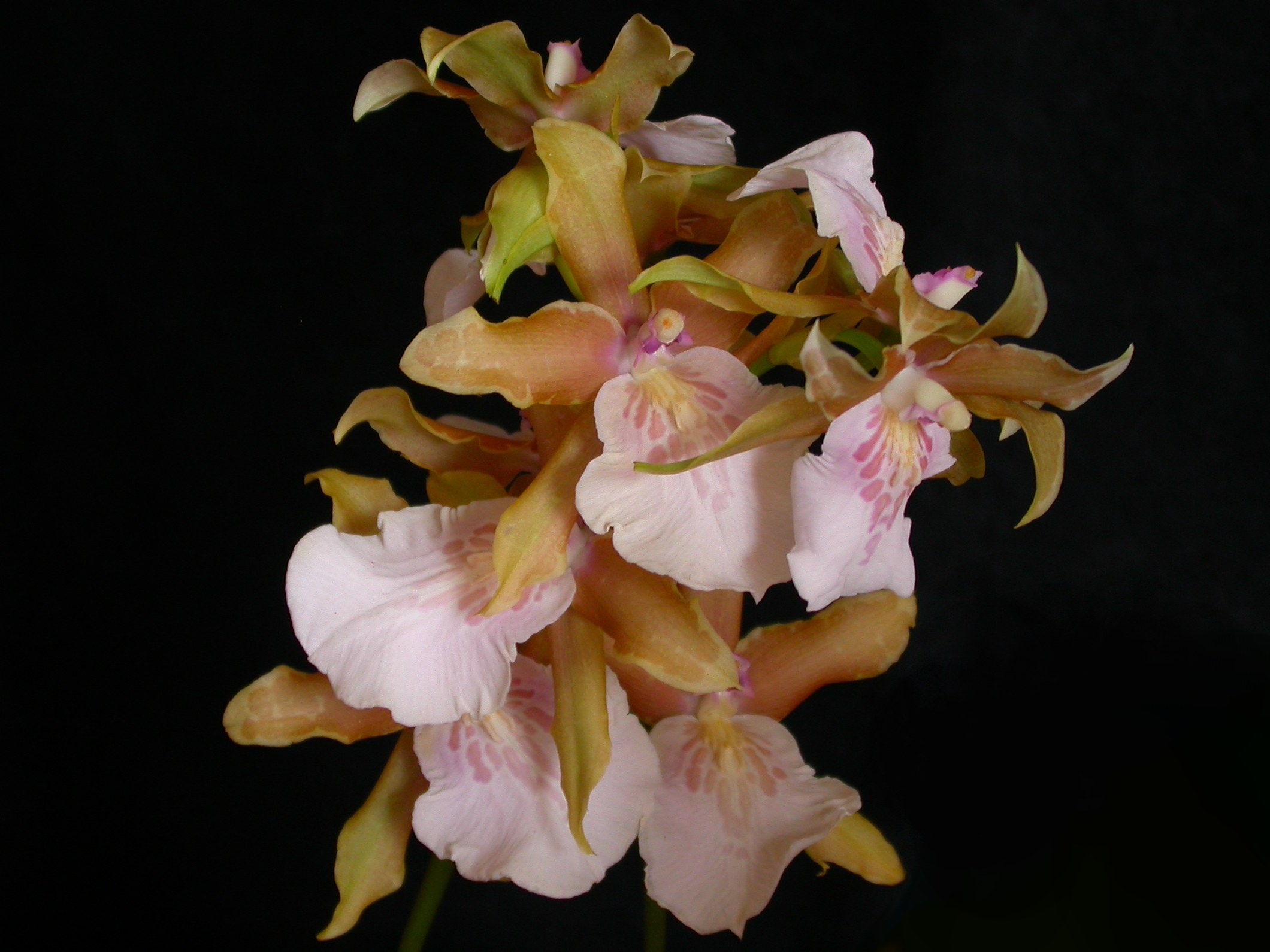
Miltonia × bluntii This is the natural hybrid of M. spectabilis and M. clowesii.

Considering its limited number of species, it is surprising that eight natural hybrids of Miltonia are currently known, a number that almost equals the number of species and also implies that the most important pollinator of the majority of the species possibly is the same. As the crossing of two species uses to produce variable plants most of these hybrids have been described more than once and some have three or four synonyms. M. spectabilis is the species which has produced the largest number of hybrids, five: Miltonia × bluntii when crossed with M. clowesii, Miltonia × cogniauxiae with M. regnellii, Miltonia × flava with M. flavescens, Miltonia × leucoglossa with M. candida and Miltonia × rosina with M. cuneata, furthermore it is possible there is also one with M. moreliana, which has not yet been described because M. moreliana itself was earlier considered a variety of M. spectabilis.

M. candida, besides the hybrid already mentioned with M. spectabilis, also produced two others: Miltonia × binotii with M. regnellii and Miltonia × lamarckeana with M. clowesii. The remaining hybrid, Miltonia × peetersiana was previously considered a synonym of M. × bluntii but because M. moreliana is now a species distinct from M. spectabilis it is its hybrid with M. clowesii, which has entirely purple flowers instead the one with light brown petals and sepals.

- Miltonia × bluntii Rchb.f. (1879) (= Miltonia clowesii × Miltonia spectabilis) (Brazil)
- Miltonia × cogniauxiae Peeters ex Cogn. & Gooss. (1900) (Miltonia regnellii × Miltonia spectabilis) (Brazil)
- Miltonia × cyrtochiloides Barb.Rodr. (1877) (Miltonia flavescens × Miltonia spectabilis) (Brazil)
- Miltonia × lamarckeana Rchb.f. (1885) (Miltonia candida × Miltonia clowesii) (Brazil)

== Distribution ==
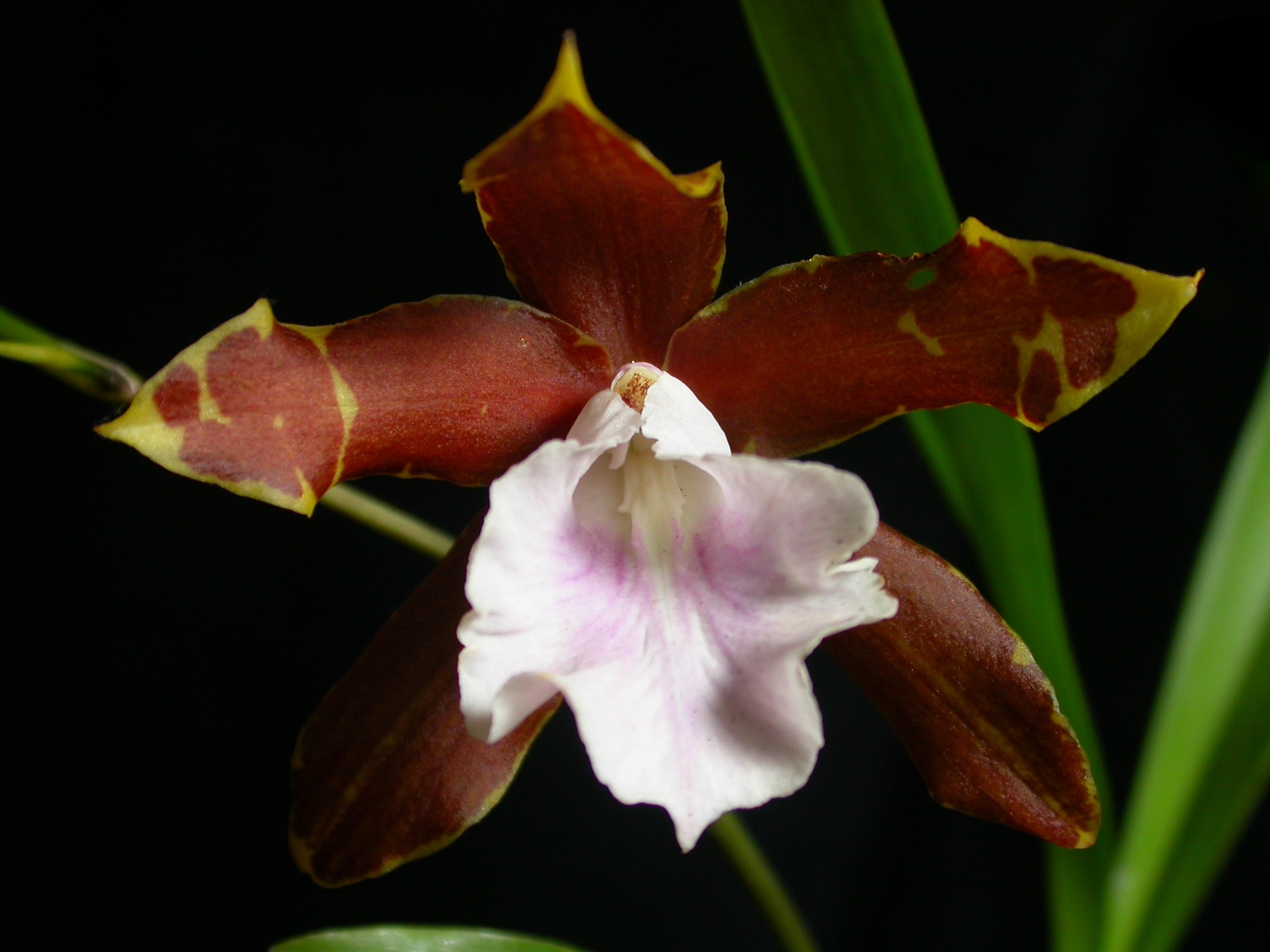
Miltonia candida This is the only species with a labellum that embraces the column in a way that reminds one of the Cattleya species.

Miltonia species range starts on the area of Missiones in the northeast of Argentina and east of Paraguay and spreads north along the Brazilian mountains of Serra do Mar and its branches up to the State of Pernambuco on Brazilian northeast. They occupy mostly areas between 200 and 1,500 meters of altitude meters, however the majority of the species are more often found about 600 to 900 meters. Miltonia species can be found from shady areas inside the forest to areas more exposed to the sun, however never are under full sunlight; usually in ventilated places where they receive plenty humidity during the night and early morning. They are always epiphyte and, because they grow very fast, each pseudobulb originating two new growths every year, they soon form large colonies.

Miltonia russelliana and M. flavescens are the ones with the widest dispersion and found at lower altitudes. M. flavescens is the only species that exists in countries other than Brazil and is also the one that spreads farther north. M. russelliana range starts on Rio Grande do Sul and ends at Bahia State. M. regnellii is also widespread although does not go northern than Rio de Janeiro. M. moreliana is a species more common at lower altitudes and warmer areas existing from Rio to Pernambuco. Miltonia candida, M. clowesii and M. spectabilis are restricted to the four states of Region Southeast of Brazil. Miltonia cuneata is just from São Paulo and Rio and the one that grow at highest altitudes. M. kayasimae is the only species really rare; it has been found just a couple of times in a very restricted area close to Salesópolis, in São Paulo State. The mountains area between São Paulo and Rio de Janeiro, where almost all species do exist may be considered the center of distribution of Miltonia.

== Cultivation ==
Despite being easy to grow, Miltonia species tend to be subject to spots on their thin leaves, generally caused by fungi proliferation and normally, when exposed to the amount of light they need to a full bloom, their foliage gets a bit too yellow-colored, although they should never be exposed to full sunlight. Finding the right balance of light exposure to avoid yellow leaves but still produce nice blooming is important and with some precautions the grower will succeed. They are not terribly sensitive to temperature, but they do vary according to their species make-up and origin; M. cuneata being one that grows cooler and M. moreliana the warmer growing, but all species under intermediate temperature with at least 10 °C of variation between day and night. Despite the fact that they exhibit a rest period after blooming, Miltonia always need to be watered, and more abundantly during active growth and blooming. they need at least 65% relative humidity and good ventilation all the time. Moderate weekly fertilizing with a balanced formula is beneficial during active growth. They may be potted in a compost of half-chopped Sphagnum, peat, and some medium-sized lumps of charcoal, or mounted on plaques of vegetable fiber, however if mounted they will need more frequent waterings.

== Intergeneric hybrids ==
Hybrids between Miltonia and orchids from other genera are placed in the following nothogenera:

- × Aliceara (Brassia × Miltonia × Oncidium)
- × Aspodonia (Aspasia × Miltonia × Odontoglossum)
- × Bakerara (Brassia × Miltonia × Odontoglossum × Oncidium)
- × Beallara (Brassia × Cochlioda × Miltonia × Odontoglossum)
- × Biltonara (Ada × Cochlioda × Miltonia × Odontoglossum)
- × Blackara (Aspasia × Cochlioda × Miltonia × Odontoglossum)
- × Brilliandeara (Aspasia × Brassia × Cochlioda × Miltonia × Odontoglossum × Oncidium)
- × Burrageara (Cochlioda × Miltonia × Odontoglossum × Oncidium)
- × Charlesworthara (Cochlioda × Miltonia × Oncidium)
- × Colmanara (Miltonia × Odontoglossum × Oncidium)
- × Crawshayara (Aspasia × Brassia × Miltonia × Oncidium)
- × Degarmoara (Brassia × Miltonia × Odontoglossum)
- × Derosaara (Aspasia × Brassia × Miltonia × Odontoglossum)
- × Duggerara (Ada × Brassia × Miltonia)
- × Dunningara (Aspasia × Miltonia × Oncidium)
- × Forgetara (Aspasia × Brassia × Miltonia)
- × Goodaleara (Brassia × Cochlioda × Miltonia × Odontoglossum × Oncidium)
- × Maunderara (Ada × Cochlioda × Miltonia × Odontoglossum × Oncidium)
- × Milpasia (Aspasia × Miltonia)
- × Milpilia (Miltonia × Trichopilia)
- × Miltada (Ada × Miltonia)
- × Miltadium (Ada × Miltonia × Oncidium)
- × Miltarettia (Comparettia × Miltonia)
- × Miltassia (Brassia × Miltonia)
- × Miltistonia (Baptistonia × Miltonia)
- × Miltonidium (Miltonia × Oncidium)
- × Miltonioda (Cochlioda × Miltonia)
- × Morrisonara (Ada × Miltonia × Odontoglossum)
- × Norwoodara (Brassia × Miltonia × Oncidium × Rodriguezia)
- × Odontonia (Miltonia × Odontoglossum)
- × Rodritonia (Miltonia × Rodriguezia)
- × Sauledaara (Aspasia × Brassia × Miltonia × Oncidium × Rodriguezia)
- × Schafferara (Aspasia × Brassia × Cochlioda × Miltonia × Odontoglossum)
- × Schilligerara (Aspasia × Gomesa × Miltonia)
- × Segerara (Aspasia × Cochlioda × Miltonia × Odontoglossum × Oncidium)
- × Vanalstyneara (Miltonia × Odontoglossum × Oncidium × Rodriguezia)
- × Vuylstekeara (Cochlioda × Miltonia × Odontoglossum)
- × Withnerara (Aspasia × Miltonia × Odontoglossum × Oncidium)

== Notes ==
- Miltonia Lindl., Edwards's Bot. Reg. 23: t. 1976 (1837)
- New species : Orchid Research Newsletter 47 (January 2006); Royal Botanical Gardens, Kew.
