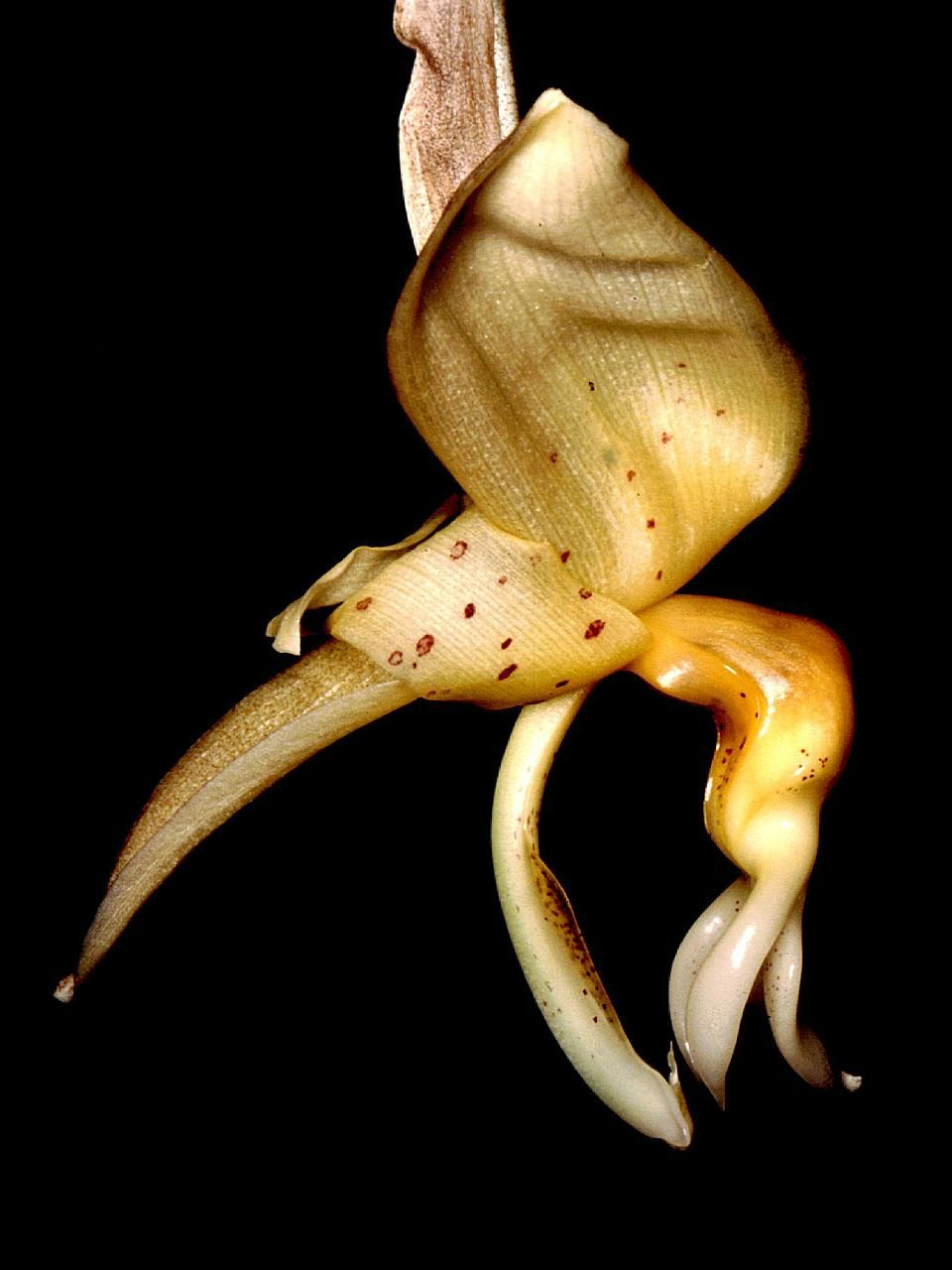
- Stanhopea maculosa flower

Scientific classification
- Kingdom: Plantae
- Clade: Tracheophytes
- Clade: Angiosperms
- Clade: Monocots
- Order: Asparagales
- Family: Orchidaceae
- Subfamily: Epidendroideae
- Genus: Stanhopea
- Species: S. maculosa

Binomial name
- Stanhopea maculosa Knowles & Westc.

Synonyms
- Stanhopea marshii Rchb.f.; Stanhopea fregeana Rchb.f.

= Stanhopea maculosa =

Species of orchid

Stanhopea maculosa is a species of orchid endemic to western Mexico. Dodson (1975) considered Stanhopea schilleriana a synonym of this species.
