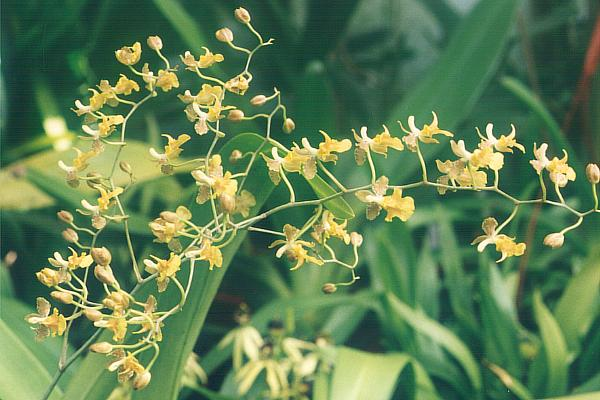

Scientific classification
- Kingdom: Plantae
- Clade: Tracheophytes
- Clade: Angiosperms
- Clade: Monocots
- Order: Asparagales
- Family: Orchidaceae
- Subfamily: Epidendroideae
- Genus: Oncidium
- Species: O. longicornu

Binomial name
- Oncidium longicornu Mutel

Synonyms
- Oncidium unicornutum Knowles & Westc.; Oncidium unicorne Lindl.; Oncidium monoceras Hook.; Oncidium rhinoceros Rchb.f.; Oncidium gautieri Regel; Oncidium macronyx Rchb.f.; Oncidium longicornu var. gautieri (Regel) Cogn.; Oncidium longicornu var. grossmannii Dammer; Rhinocidium longicornu (Mutel) Baptista, Colet.; Rhinocidium macronyx (Rchb.f.) Baptista, Colet.

= Oncidium longicornu =

Species of orchid

Oncidium longicornu is a species of orchid occurring from Brazil to northeastern Argentina, where it is recorded from the provinces of Misiones and Corrientes. It is an epiphytic plant, with yellow flowers appearing between October and November.
