= M. candida =

M. candida may refer to:

- Mammillaria candida, the snowball cactus, a plant species found in Mexico
- Miltonia candida, the snow-white miltonia, an orchid species endemic to southeastern Brazil

== Synonyms ==
- Masdevallia candida, a synonym for Masdevallia tovarensis, an orchid species endemic to northern Venezuela

== See also ==
- Candida (disambiguation)
