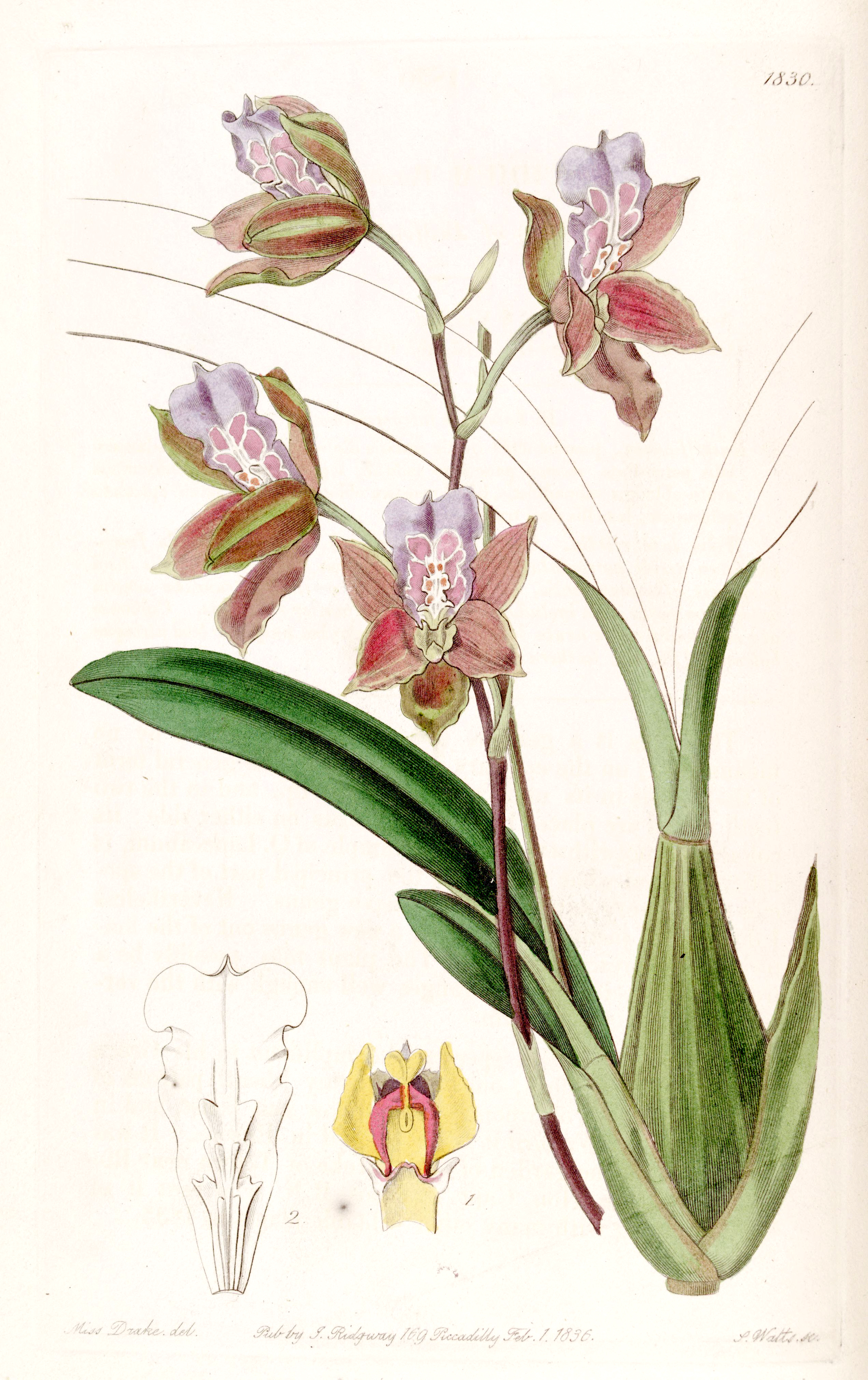

Scientific classification
- Kingdom: Plantae
- Clade: Tracheophytes
- Clade: Angiosperms
- Clade: Monocots
- Order: Asparagales
- Family: Orchidaceae
- Subfamily: Epidendroideae
- Genus: Miltonia
- Species: M. russelliana

Binomial name
- Miltonia russelliana (Lindl.) Lindl.

Synonyms
- Oncidium russellianum Lindl. (basionym); Gynizodon russelliana (Lindl.) Raf.; Oncidium russellianum var. pallidum Regel; Miltonia quadrijuga Dusén & Kraenzl.; Anneliesia russelliana (Lindl.) Senghas & Lückel

= Miltonia russelliana =

Russell's miltonia

Species of orchid

Miltonia russelliana, the Russell's miltonia, is a species of orchid occurring in southeastern and southern Brazil.
