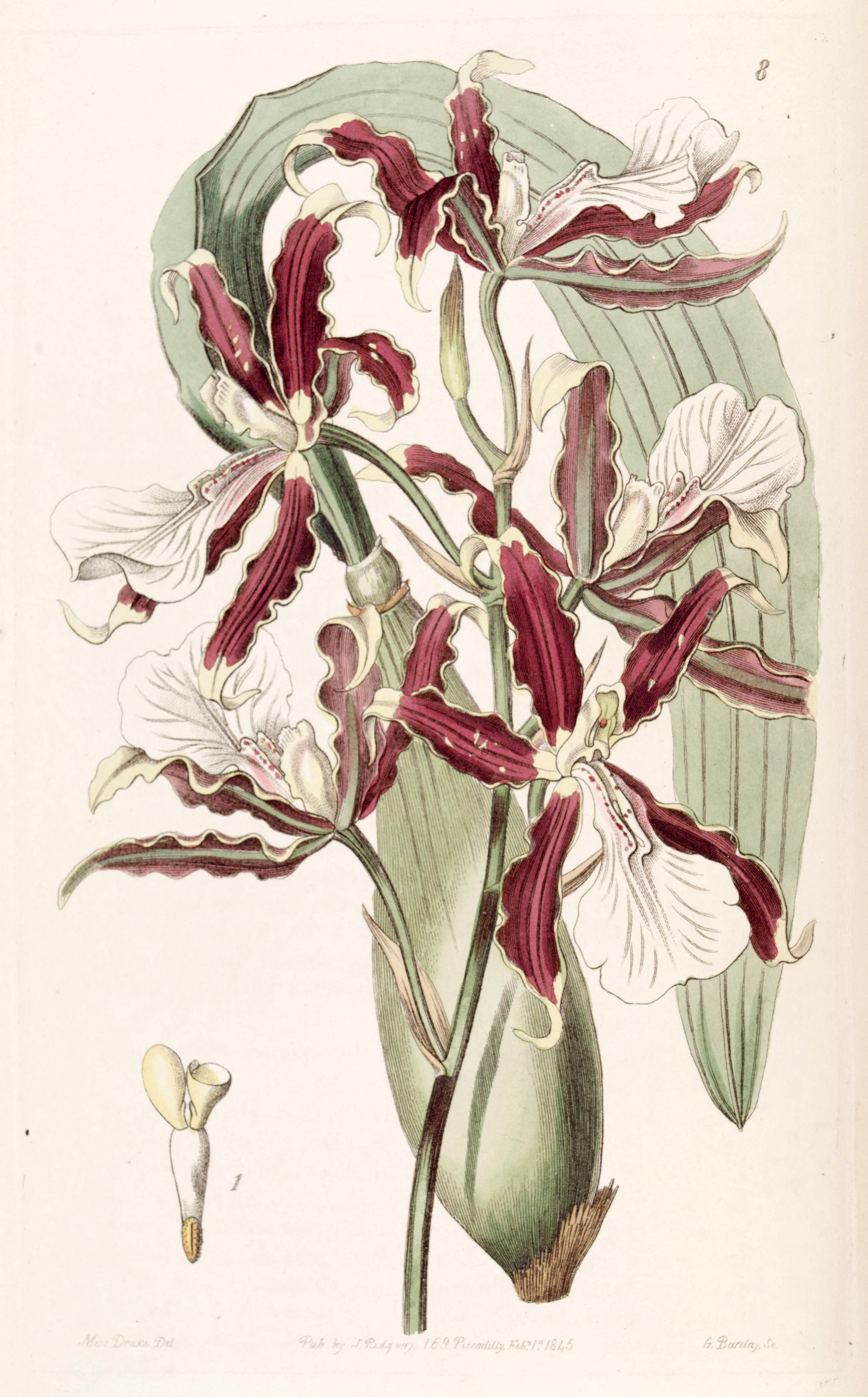

Scientific classification
- Kingdom: Plantae
- Clade: Tracheophytes
- Clade: Angiosperms
- Clade: Monocots
- Order: Asparagales
- Family: Orchidaceae
- Subfamily: Epidendroideae
- Genus: Miltonia
- Species: M. cuneata

Binomial name
- Miltonia cuneata Lindl.

Synonyms
- Miltonia speciosa Klotzsch; Oncidium speciosum (Klotzsch) Rchb.f.; Miltonia velloziana Ruschi & La Gasa; Anneliesia cuneata (Lindl.) Senghas & Lückel

= Miltonia cuneata =

Wedge-shaped miltonia

Species of orchid

Miltonia cuneata, the wedge-shaped miltonia, is a species of orchid endemic to southeastern Brazil. Found in Brazil at elevations around 800 to 1000 meters in dense, wet montane forests as a robust, medium sized, creeping, warm to cool growing epiphyte with slightly tapered, slightly flattened pseudobulbs that can be clustered or well spaced and are enveloped basally by 2 to 4 non-foliaceous sheaths and carry 2 to 3, narrow, acute leaves that blooms in the winter and early spring on a erect or arching, to 2' [60 cm] long, few to several [5 to 8] flowered inflorescence with triangular, acute, papery bracts.
