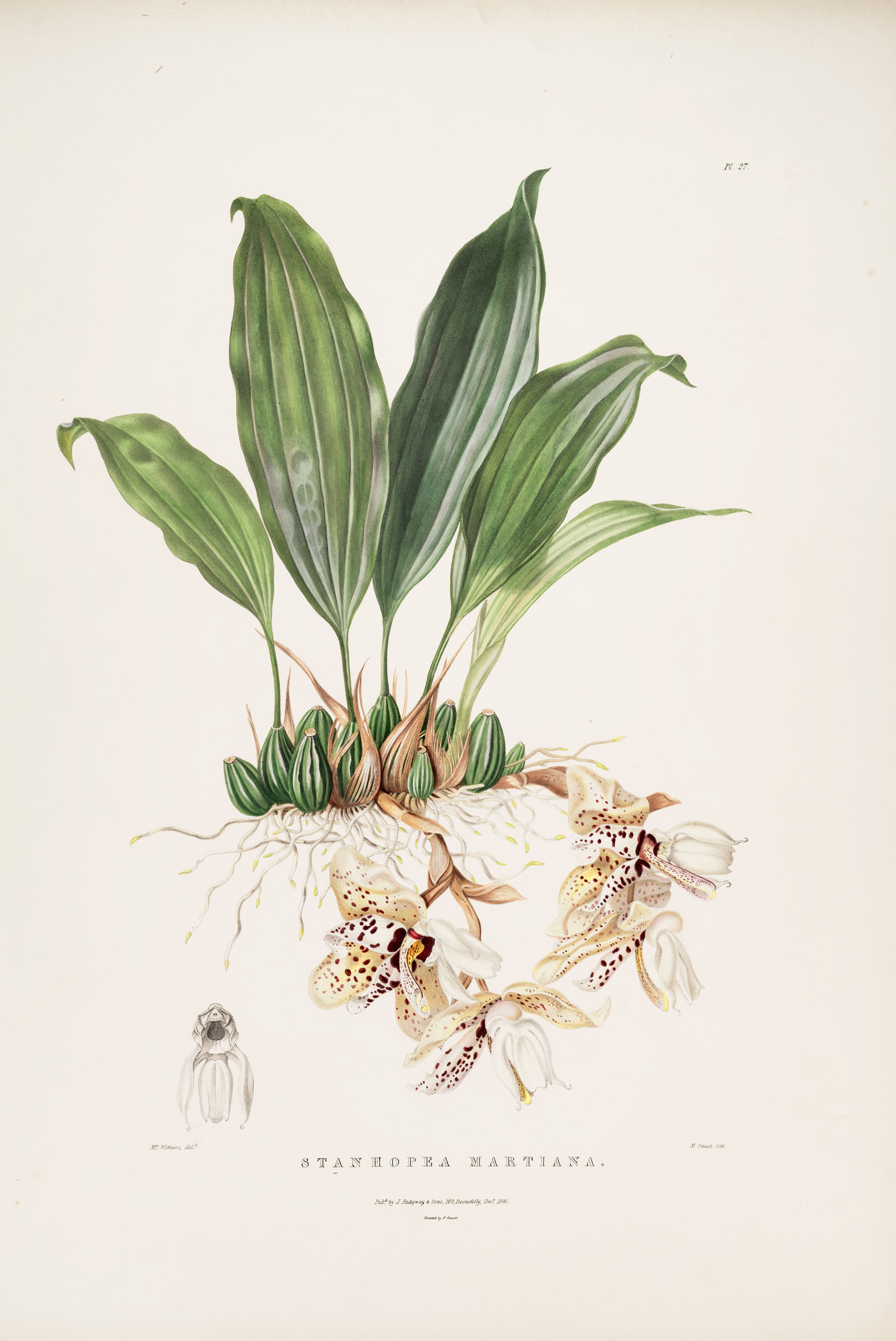
- Stanhopea martiana flower

Scientific classification
- Kingdom: Plantae
- Clade: Tracheophytes
- Clade: Angiosperms
- Clade: Monocots
- Order: Asparagales
- Family: Orchidaceae
- Subfamily: Epidendroideae
- Genus: Stanhopea
- Species: S. martiana

Binomial name
- Stanhopea martiana Bateman Ex Lindl.

Synonyms
- Stanhopea uncinata Drapiez; Stanhopea martiana var. bicolor Lindl.; Stanhopea velata C.Morren; Stanhopea implicata Westc. ex Lindl.

= Stanhopea martiana =

Species of orchid

Stanhopea martiana is a species of orchid endemic to southwestern Mexico.
