= Oeceoclades rauhii =

Scientific classification
- Kingdom: Plantae
- Clade: Tracheophytes
- Clade: Angiosperms
- Clade: Monocots
- Order: Asparagales
- Family: Orchidaceae
- Subfamily: Epidendroideae
- Genus: Oeceoclades
- Species: O. rauhii

Binomial name
- Oeceoclades rauhii (Senghas) Garay & P.Taylor

Synonyms
- Eulophidium rauhii Senghas

Species of orchid

Oeceoclades rauhii is a terrestrial orchid species in the genus Oeceoclades that is endemic to northern Madagascar. It was first described by the German botanist Karlheinz Senghas in 1973 as Eulophidium rauhii and then transferred to the genus Oeceoclades in 1976 by Leslie Andrew Garay and Peter Taylor. It was named in honor of Werner Rauh who, along with Karlheinz, collected the type specimen from just south of Anivorano Nord. Garay and Taylor noted that O. rauhii is closely related to O. boinensis, but it has a labellum with four lobes of equal size and linear-lanceolate sepals and petals.
