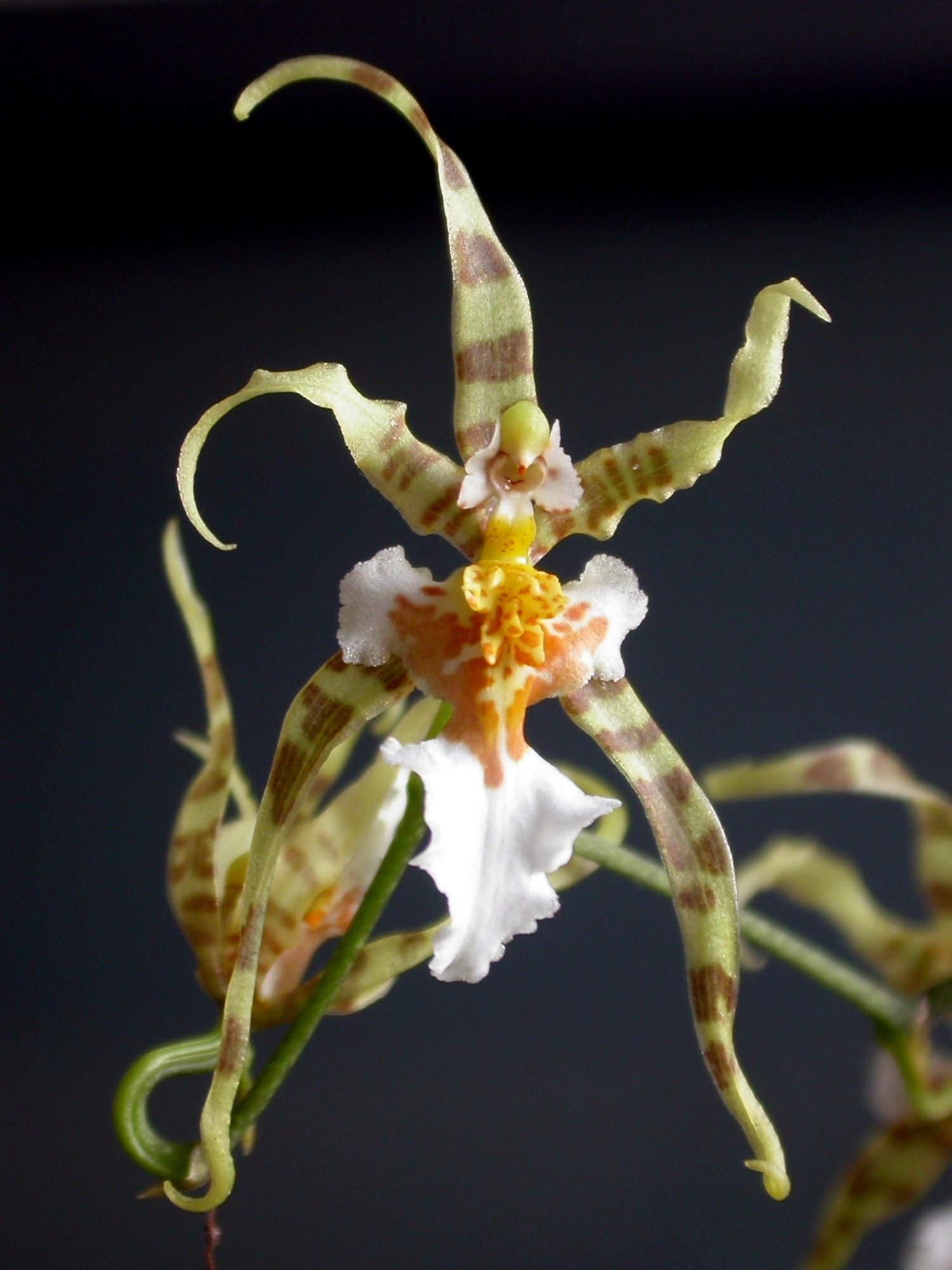

Scientific classification
- Kingdom: Plantae
- Clade: Tracheophytes
- Clade: Angiosperms
- Clade: Monocots
- Order: Asparagales
- Family: Orchidaceae
- Subfamily: Epidendroideae
- Genus: Miltonia
- Species: M. phymatochila

Binomial name
- Miltonia phymatochila (Lindl.) N.H.Williams & M.W.Chase

Synonyms
- Oncidium phymatochilum Lindl.; Phymatochilum brasiliense Christenson

= Miltonia phymatochila =

Genus of orchids

Miltonia phymatochila, synonym Phymatochilum brasiliense, is an orchid species native to northeast and southeast Brazil. It is an inhabitant of the Serra do Mar mountains. It vegetatively resembles Oncidium species rather than other Miltonia species and was at one time placed as the only species in the genus Phymatochilum.

== Description ==
Miltonia phymatochila presents a large number of robust, long and simple or slightly branched roots shooting from a highly short and robust rhizome which gives birth to aggregated pseudobulbs. The pseudobulbs are erect, smooth and light green when young and later minutely wrinkled and brownish green, very robust and large, which may vary form slightly fusiform to the most common rounded shape although clearly flattened that bears one leaf only At the base the pseudobulbs are protected by four large distichous, carinated, imbricating and subequitant bracts, the longest of them the same length of the pseudobulb. The leaf is erect, slightly concave and curved, leathery and thick, rigid despite somewhat flexible, meaning it will not break when it is slightly curved; at the base it is folded; green on the face, presenting numerous nervures, paler and brownish on the back where it shows a salient medium nerve. The inflorescence is basal, slender, pale green with subtle minute purple dots, highly alternately branched and large, sometimes bearing hundreds of flowers placed at regular distances.

The flowers have a rounded but slightly triangular ovary; their segments are wide opened with yellow green sepals and petals, transversally stained or striped of brown; and white labellum with a yellow warted callus close to the base surrounded by brown orange stains. The sepals and petals are linear, elongated and highly acute, curved at the apexes, the petals slightly shorter and wider that the sepals and the sepals more twisted than the petals. The labellum is slightly convex, shorter than the other segments, almost flat, three lobed, the lateral ones are rounded forming two auricles and the intermediate is triangular, highly pointed and spotless. The column is curved with two large often laciniated wings lateral to the stigma and a terminal anther. Miltonia phymatochila blooms between from the end of summer to middle autumn and its sweet fragrant flowers last for about two weeks. There is no reference about their pollinators.

Miltonia phymatochila does not have many morphological characteristics in common with other species of Miltonia. It has much more robust pseudobulbs and leaves, which also are of different color and shapes. The rhizome is shorter; the pseudobulbs closer to each other, much fleshier and more fibrous, almost rounded, darker. The leaves are much wider, leathery, thicker, darker and clearly veined, in all with an aspect that reminds the one of Maxillaria setigera. The inflorescence is branched, almost three times taller than the leaves, bearing more than a hundred small Oncidium type flowers.

== Taxonomic notes ==
Measures (mm)
Structure	Length	Width
Rhizome	15	15
Leaf	500	100
Pseudobulb	100	70
Inflorescence	1800	-
Flower	50	25
Sepal	35	3
Petal	25	3
Labellum	18	12

For some unknown reason there is a number of original descriptions by John Lindley, of plants received from Loddiges, that record Mexico, instead of Brazil, as the country of origin of the plants. It is not known if this information came from Loddiges, whether they were later confusions at the herbarium or either if it was a mistake on transport records. Some of these mistakes, particularly when occurred with less noticeable plants as Pabstiella crenata are still been solved. Some of these descriptions yet have to be cleared. The description of Miltonia phymatochila was one of these mistakes. This species is not recorded in Mexico or Central America after this early records. Anyway, in 1847, Lindley received two different plants one from Loddiges and another from reverend Clowes, from Liverpool, an orchid enthusiast Lindley homaged when describing Miltonia clowesii, and the following year he described it under the genus Oncidium as O. phymatochilum, choosing this name in reference to the warted labellum of its flowers.

Miltonia phymatochila, whose flowers are very similar to the ones of Oncidium was in fact considered a member of this genus until 2001 when, based on the results of their molecular analysis, it was moved by Norris Williams and Mark Chase to the genus Miltonia. On the transfer publication they claim that, despite the morphologic differences, the relationship is very close and, supposedly, they did not want to propose a new genus to subordinate one species only. As this species shows a morphology that is closer to Oncidium species than to Miltonia, because of its small yellowish flowers and highly branched inflorescence, this result and the following transfer was a surprise. In 2005, Eric Christenson suggested a new genus and the name Phymatochilum brasiliense for it.

Molecular analysis shows that Miltonia phymatochila is most closely related to the genus Miltonia and then Aspasia, Brassia and Ada, which are the most important genera included in this that is one of the eight clades that form the subtribus Oncidiinae of tribus Cymbidieae.

== Distribution and habit ==
Miltonia phymatochila is a comparatively large sympodial epiphyte species which inhabits high areas of the Atlantic Forest of Rio de Janeiro, São Paulo, Espírito Santo, Minas Gerais and Pernambuco States of Brazil, particularly in the warmer areas around Serra do Mar chain of mountains, where it is somewhat rare. It grows under the shadow of trees, however, mostly near the jungles well ventilated clearances where it can get brighter light, between 600 and 1,300 meters of altitude in dryer areas. It ordinarily grows over the trees where the shade is not intense, on thick branches.

== Cultivation ==
Miltonia phymatochila is not hard to grow. Their roots are somewhat sensitive excessive humidity therefore it is important they are potted in a well-drained substrate and placed in a warm and well ventilated location at the greenhouse. As they show a rest period after blooming, it is beneficial to reduce watering while they are not in active growth period, and resume abundant watering again during active growth. Moderate weekly fertilizing with a balanced formula is beneficial during active growth. They may be potted in a compost of vegetable fiber and some medium-sized lumps of charcoal. As they usually inhabit sunny areas they enjoy a good amount of light, although never full sunlight, therefore the best place for them is the sunnier in the greenhouse, the same where the Cattleya are.
