= M. rosea =

M. rosea may refer to:

- Marginella rosea, a species of sea snail
- Melibe rosea, the cowled nudibranch, a dendronotid nudibranch species only found in South Africa
- Mesua rosea, a flowering plant species found only in Malaysia
- "Microvirga rosea", a species of alphaproteobacterium
- Mycena rosea, the rosy bonnet, a mushroom species

== Synonyms ==
- Miltonia rosea, a synonym for Miltonia moreliana
- Misumena rosea, a synonym for Misumenops asperatus

== See also ==
- Rosea (disambiguation)
