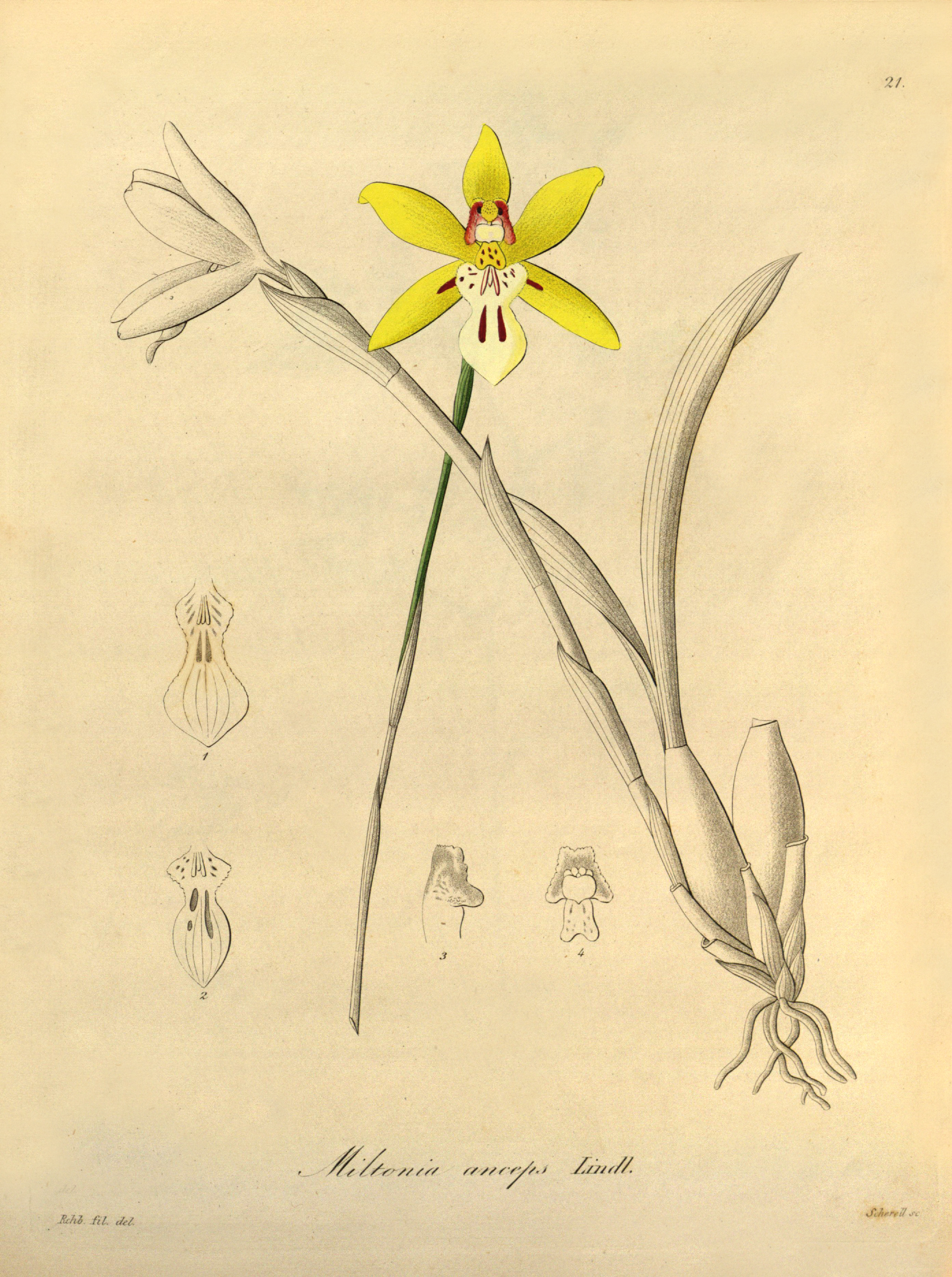

Scientific classification
- Kingdom: Plantae
- Clade: Tracheophytes
- Clade: Angiosperms
- Clade: Monocots
- Order: Asparagales
- Family: Orchidaceae
- Subfamily: Epidendroideae
- Genus: Miltonia
- Species: M. flava

Binomial name
- Miltonia flava Lindl.

Synonyms
- Odontoglossum anceps Klotzsch; Miltonia anceps (Klotzsch) Lindl.; Miltonia pinelii Rchb.f.; Oncidium anceps (Klotzsch) Rchb.f.

= Miltonia flava =

Species of orchid

Miltonia flava is a species of orchid native to Brazil (Rio de Janeiro). The type specimen examined by Lindl. was from the Loddiges family, who obtained it from Brazil in 1843. Lindley first published it as Miltonia flava on July 15, 1848 in The Gardeners' Chronicle, though he later republished it in his Folia Orchidacea as Miltonia anceps, which is now a synonym.
