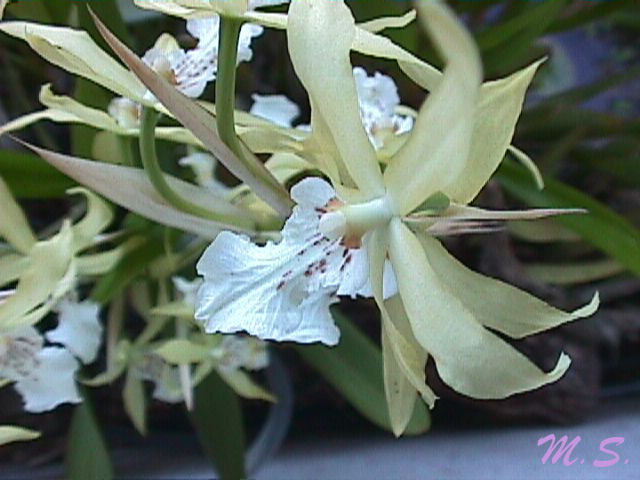

Scientific classification
- Kingdom: Plantae
- Clade: Tracheophytes
- Clade: Angiosperms
- Clade: Monocots
- Order: Asparagales
- Family: Orchidaceae
- Subfamily: Epidendroideae
- Genus: Miltonia
- Species: M. flavescens

Binomial name
- Miltonia flavescens (Lindl.) Lindl.

Synonyms
- Cyrtochilum flavescens Lindl. (basionym); Cyrtochilum stellatum Lindl.; Miltonia stellata (Lindl.) Lindl.; Oncidium stellatum (Lindl.) Beer; Oncidium flavescens (Lindl.) Rchb.f.; Oncidium flavescens var. stellatum (Lindl.) Rchb.f.; Miltonia flavescens var. grandiflora Regel; Miltonia flavescens var. stellata (Lindl.) Regel; Miltonia flavescens var. typica Regel; Miltonia loddigesii Regel

= Miltonia flavescens =

Yellowish miltonia

Species of plant

Miltonia flavescens, the yellowish miltonia, is a species of orchid occurring in southern Brazil, northeastern Argentina, and Paraguay, and has been reported from eastern Peru.
