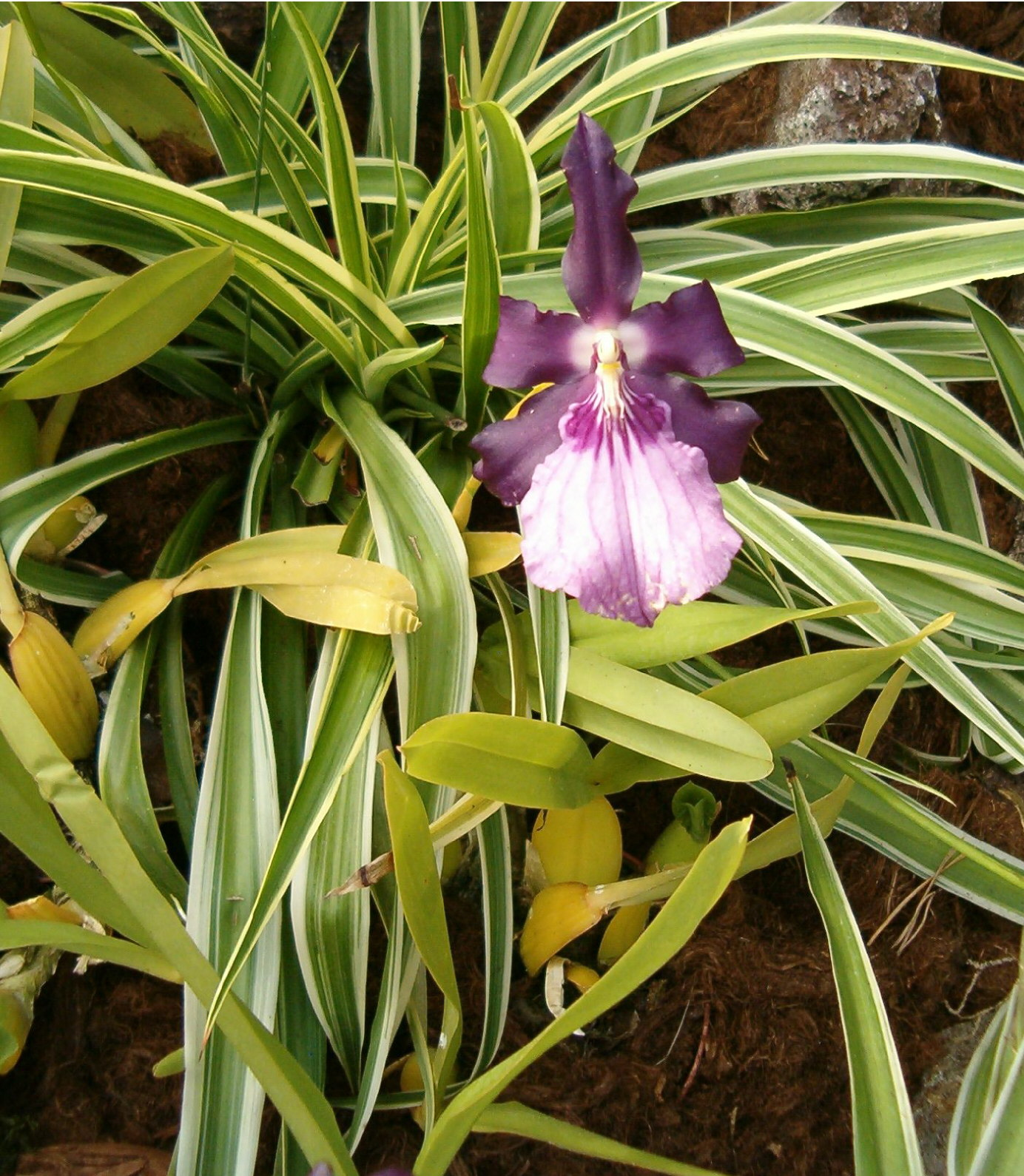

Scientific classification
- Kingdom: Plantae
- Clade: Tracheophytes
- Clade: Angiosperms
- Clade: Monocots
- Order: Asparagales
- Family: Orchidaceae
- Subfamily: Epidendroideae
- Genus: Miltonia
- Species: M. moreliana

Binomial name
- Miltonia moreliana (Lindl.) Lindl.

Synonyms
- Miltonia spectabilis var. moreliana (A.Rich.) Henfr.; Miltonia rosea Verschaff. ex Lem.; Miltonia warneri G.Nicholson; Miltonia spectabilis var. atrorubens Rolfe

= Miltonia moreliana =

Species of orchid

Miltonia moreliana is a species of orchid endemic to southeastern Brazil.

The species is native to the Atlantic Forest biome (Mata Atlantica Brasileira), within southeastern Bahia to northern Espírito Santo states.
