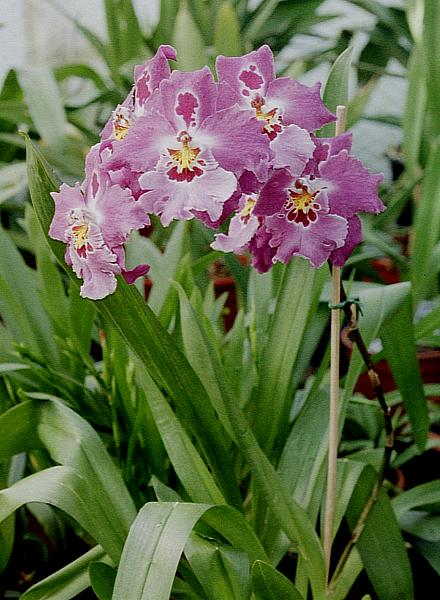
- × Vuylstekeara Fall In Love

Scientific classification
- Kingdom: Plantae
- Clade: Tracheophytes
- Clade: Angiosperms
- Clade: Monocots
- Order: Asparagales
- Family: Orchidaceae
- Subfamily: Epidendroideae
- Subtribe: Oncidiinae
- Genus: × Vuylstekeara hort.

= × Vuylstekeara =

Genus of flowering plants

× Vuylstekeara, abbreviated as Vuyl. in horticultural trade, is an intergeneric hybrid. The 2017 Royal Horticultural Society gives its origin as crosses among three orchid genera, Cochlioda × Miltonia × Odontoglossum. As of April 2026, Cochlioda and Odontoglossum are treated as synonyms of Oncidium in Plants of the World Online, so that the crosses would be between the two genera Miltonia and Oncidium.

The first cross of what were then three genera was made by the Dutch horticulturalist Charles Vuylsteke. The 1910 International Horticultural Congress had stipulated that hybrids involving multiple genera should receive a conventional generic designation, preferably that of some distinguished person, with the termination 'ara'. Charles Vuylsteke was the first orchid grower whose name was used this way.

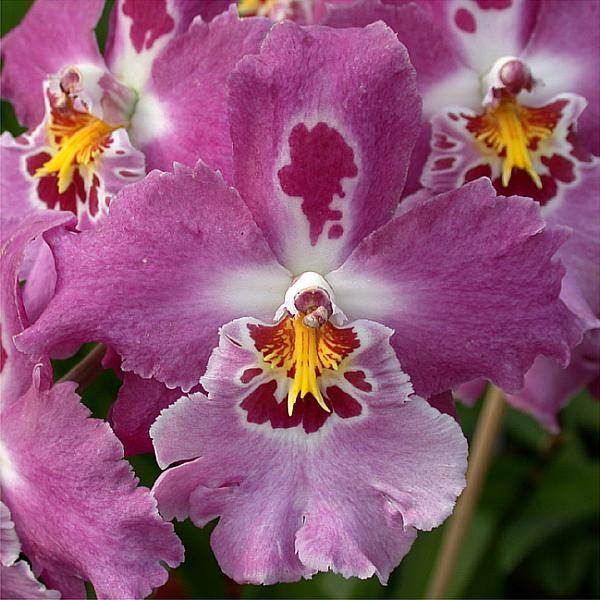
× Vuylstekeara Fall In Love

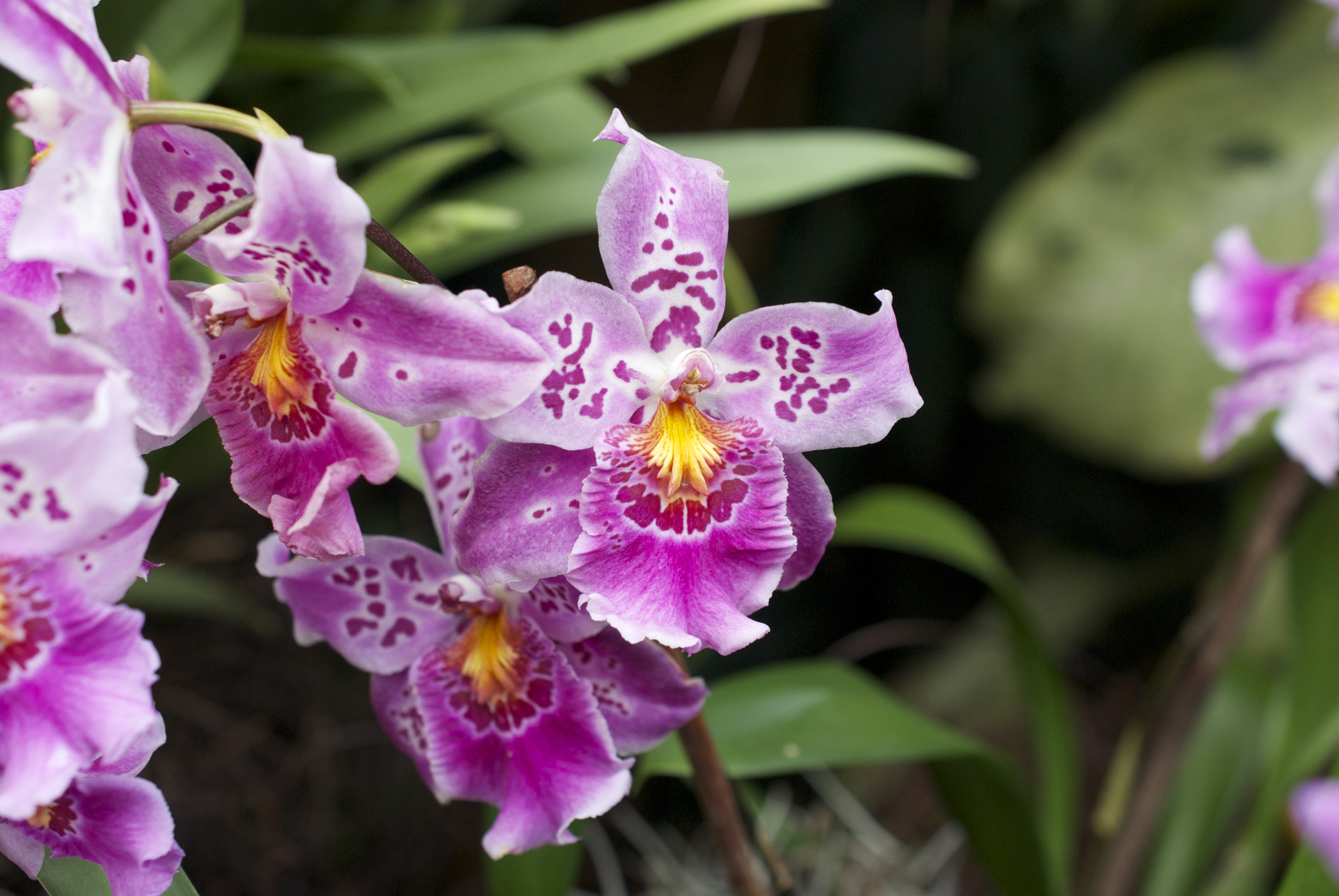
× Vuylstekeara Carnivale 'Rio'

== Bibliography ==
- Podevijn, D., ed. (1995). Charles Vuylsteke, sr. en jr., fine fleur van de Belgische sierteelt (1867-1937). Ghent: Raphael Vuylsteke (privately published).

Media related to × Vuylstekeara at Wikimedia Commons
