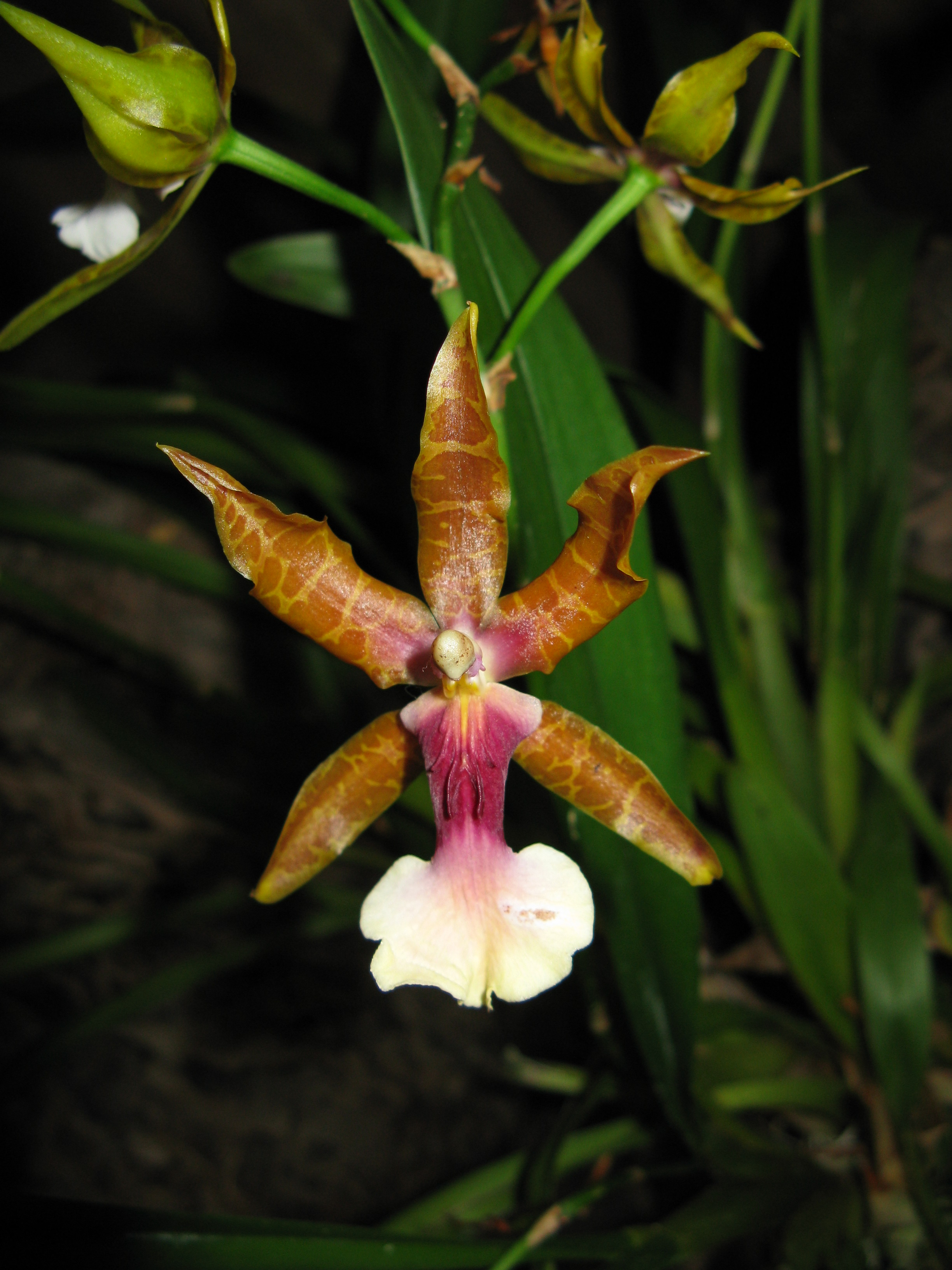

Scientific classification
- Kingdom: Plantae
- Clade: Tracheophytes
- Clade: Angiosperms
- Clade: Monocots
- Order: Asparagales
- Family: Orchidaceae
- Subfamily: Epidendroideae
- Genus: Miltonia
- Species: M. clowesii

Binomial name
- Miltonia clowesii (Lindl.) Lindl.

Synonyms
- Odontoglossum clowesii Lindl. (basionym); Brassia clowesii (Lindl.) Lindl.; Oncidium clowesii (Lindl.) Rchb.f.; Miltonia clowesii var. lamarcheana E.Morren

= Miltonia clowesii =

Clowes' miltonia

Species of orchid

Miltonia clowesii, the Clowes' miltonia, is a species of orchid native to southeastern Brazil.
