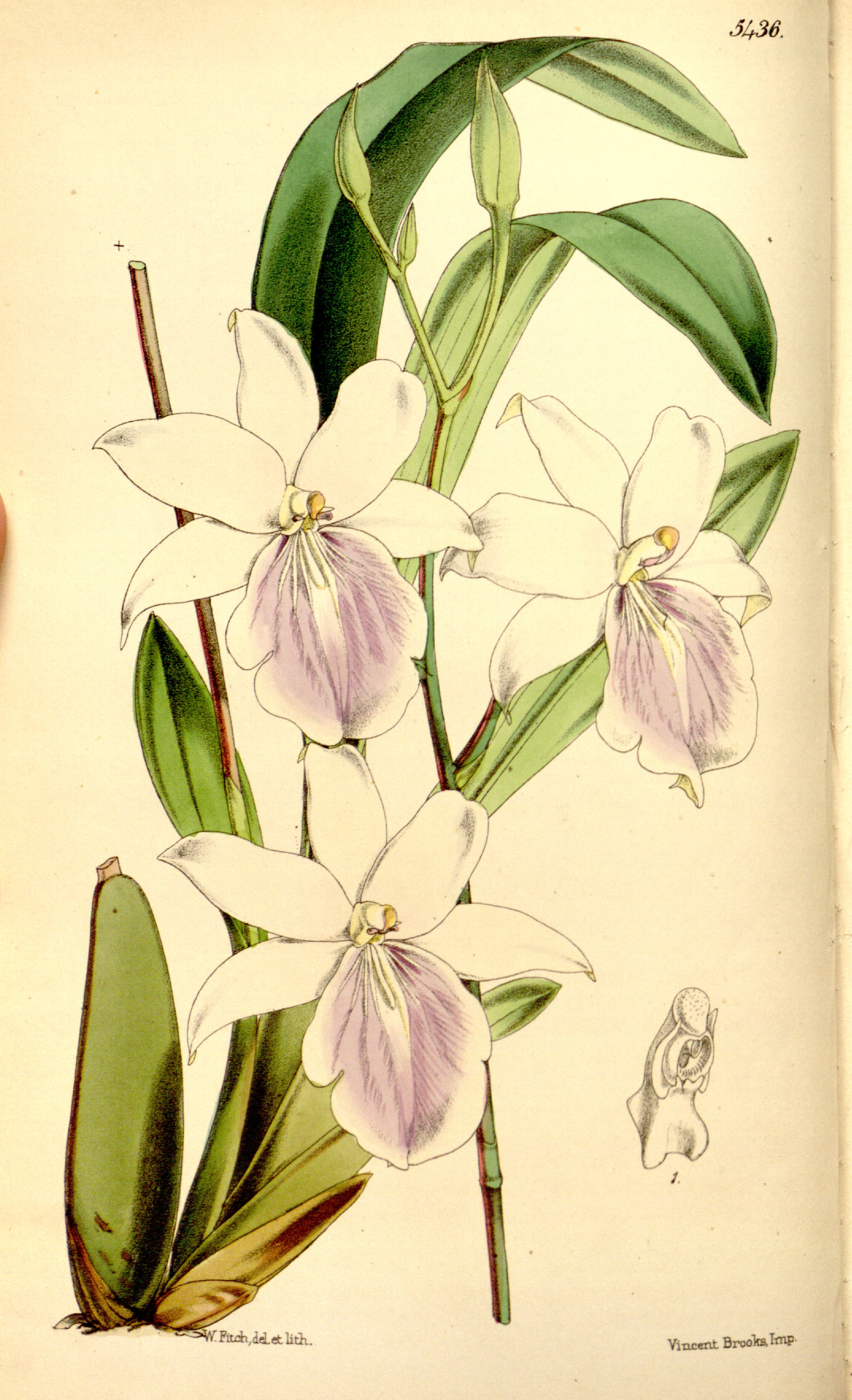

Scientific classification
- Kingdom: Plantae
- Clade: Tracheophytes
- Clade: Angiosperms
- Clade: Monocots
- Order: Asparagales
- Family: Orchidaceae
- Subfamily: Epidendroideae
- Genus: Miltonia
- Species: M. regnellii

Binomial name
- Miltonia regnellii Rchb.f.

Synonyms
- Oncidium regnellii (Rchb.f.) Rchb.f.; Miltonia cereola Lem.; Miltonia regnellii var. citrina Cogn.; Miltonia regnellii var. travassosiana Cogn.; Miltonia regnellii var. veitchiana Cogn.; Miltonia regnellii var. alba Tessmer; Miltonia regnellii f. alba (Tessmer) Roeth; Miltonia regnellii f. citrina (Cogn.) Roeth; Miltonia regnellii f. travassosiana (Cogn.) Roeth; Miltonia regnellii f. veitchiana (Cogn.) Roeth

= Miltonia regnellii =

Regnell's miltonia

Species of orchid

Miltonia regnellii, the Regnell's miltonia, is a species of orchid occurring in southeastern and southern Brazil. The specific epithet honors Anders Fredrik Regnell, a Swedish botanist who practiced in Brazil.
