= Senghasiella =

Scientific classification
- Kingdom: Plantae
- Clade: Tracheophytes
- Clade: Angiosperms
- Clade: Monocots
- Order: Asparagales
- Family: Orchidaceae
- Subfamily: Orchidoideae
- Tribe: Orchideae
- Subtribe: Orchidinae
- Genus: Senghasiella; Szlach.
- Species: S. glaucifolia

Binomial name
- Senghasiella glaucifolia (Bureau & Franch.) Szlach.

Synonyms
- Habenaria glaucifolia Bureau & Franch.; Habenaria alexandrae Schltr.; Habenaria gnomifera Schltr.

Genus of orchids

Senghasiella is a genus of flowering plants in the orchid family, Orchidaceae. It contains only one known species, Senghasiella glaucifolia, endemic to southwestern China (Gansu, Guizhou, Shaanxi, Sichuan, Tibet, Yunnan).

== See also ==
- List of Orchidaceae genera
