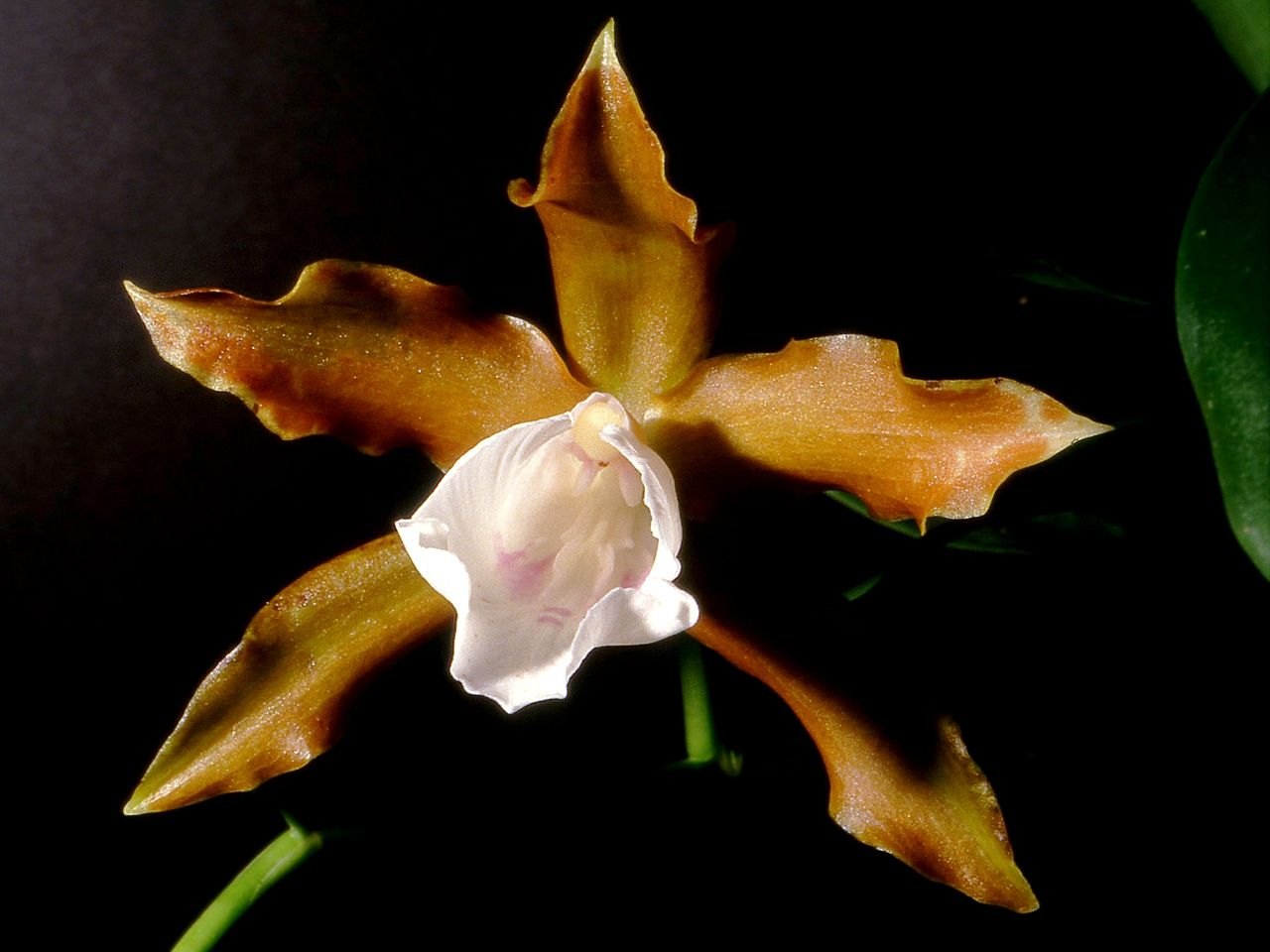

Scientific classification
- Kingdom: Plantae
- Clade: Tracheophytes
- Clade: Angiosperms
- Clade: Monocots
- Order: Asparagales
- Family: Orchidaceae
- Subfamily: Epidendroideae
- Genus: Miltonia
- Species: M. candida

Binomial name
- Miltonia candida Lindl.

Synonyms
- Oncidium candidum (Lindl.) Rchb.f.; Anneliesia candida (Lindl.) Brieger & Lückel; Miltonia candida var. flavescens Hook.; Miltonia candida var. purpureoviolacea Cogn.; Anneliesia candida var. purpureoviolacea (Cogn.) Brieger & Lückel

= Miltonia candida =

Snow-white miltonia

Species of orchid

Miltonia candida, the snow-white miltonia, is a species of orchid endemic to southeastern Brazil.
