= Karlheinz Senghas =

German botanist and orchidologist

Karlheinz Senghas (7 April 1928 – 4 February 2004) was a German botanist and orchidologist. He was a curator, scientific director, and academic director of the University of Heidelberg's Botanical Garden from 1960 until his retirement in 1993. He was also president of the Deutsche Orchideen-Gesellschaft in the 1970s and was the co-publisher and editor of several volumes of Die Orchideen, a continuation of the publication begun by Rudolf Schlechter.

He described his first orchid species, Aerangis buchlohii in 1962. Over the years, he contributed more than 300 publications on orchids and established 17 new orchid genera and 388 species. Several genera and species are named in his honor, including the orchid genera Senghasia and Senghasiella and the species Coryanthes senghasiana.

He died on 4 February 2004.
