= George Nicholson (horticulturist) =

English botanist and horticulturist (1847–1908)

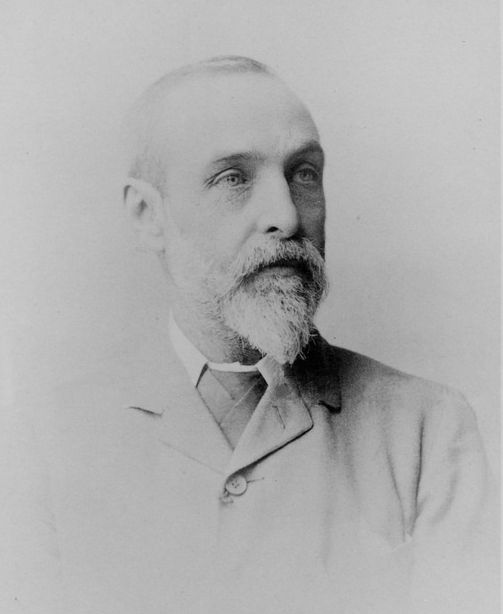
- Born: 7 December 1847
- Died: 20 September 1908 (aged 60)
- Occupation: botanist
- Known for: Victoria Medal of Honour

George Nicholson (7 December 1847 Sharow - 20 September 1908), was an English botanist and horticulturist, and one of the 60 recipients of the Victoria Medal of Honour by the Royal Horticultural Society in 1897 for their contributions to horticulture.

He is noted for having edited "The Illustrated Dictionary of Gardening", produced as an eight-part alphabetical series between 1884 and 1888 with a supplement, and published by L. Upcott Gill of London. It was also published in New York in 1889 by The American Agriculturist in 4 Volumes.

== Life ==
As recorded in various census returns, George was the son of nurseryman James Nicholson. George worked at the nursery of Fisher & Holmes in Sheffield, travelled to France and found employment at La Muette nursery in Paris, becoming fluent in both French and German. He married Elizabeth Naylor Bell at Thirsk in 1875, and she died in 1879 at the age of 28, having produced a son.

He started work at Kew in 1873, succeeding the late John Smith as Curator of the Gardens in 1886 and staying on until 1901, when ill-health forced his retirement. Even so, he undertook the occasional botanical project when his health permitted. He was living at Old Deer Park Villas, Richmond in 1881, doing clerical work for H.M Office of Works. 1891 found him living as a widower at the Royal Gardens, Kew, together with his son, James Bell Nicholson, and his sister who acted as housekeeper. Ten years later, in 1901, census returns record his still living there with his sister.

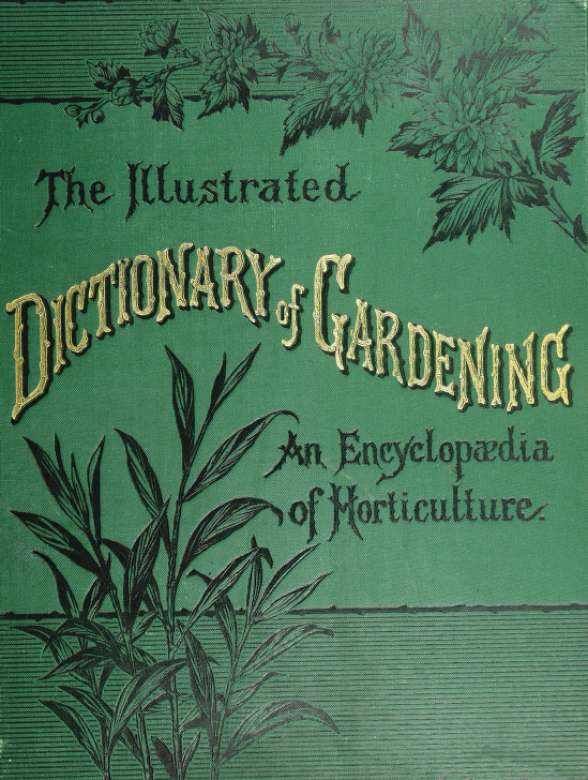

He contributed to the Journal of Botany of 1875 with an article titled “The wild flora of Kew Gardens and Pleasure grounds”. Earlier volumes of The Garden contain many of his articles on cultivated trees and shrubs. His most important work, though, was the “Illustrated Dictionary“, which soon was regarded as the standard reference work, a French edition also being published at the time. The Royal Horticultural Society's present Dictionary of Gardening published by Oxford, has Nicholson's Illustrated Dictionary as its basis, and has retained its predecessor's layout.

Nicholson was an authority on oaks and maples, and was appointed as judge in the horticulture section of the Chicago Exposition of 1893. He also inspected the Arnold Arboretum and a few other outstanding gardens in the United States, reporting back in a paper entitled "Horticulture and Arboriculture in the United States" published in the Kew Bulletin of February 1894.

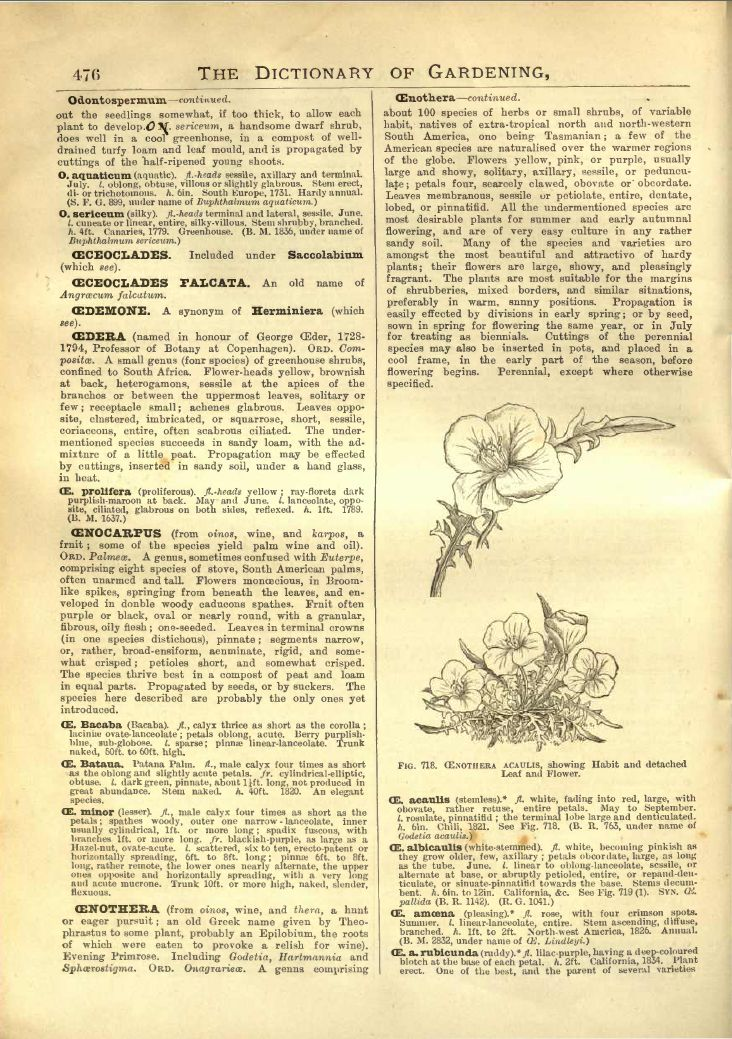
Page from "The Illustrated Dictionary of Gardening"

He was elected a Fellow of the Linnean Society in 1898, and in 1894 he was awarded The Veitch Memorial Medal in recognition of his services to gardening and the Victoria Medal of Honour in 1897. His collection of British plants was left to Professor Trail which, together with Trail’s specimens laid the foundation of the British collection at Aberdeen. George Nicholson is denoted by the author abbreviation G.Nicholson when citing a botanical name.

Nicholson was also instrumental in the planning stages of the Cruickshank Botanic Garden.
