= George Beauchamp Knowles =

English botanist and professor (1790–1862)

George Beauchamp Knowles (1790–1862) was an English botanist and a professor at the Royal School of Medicine and Surgery of Birmingham. He worked in close cooperation with Frederic Westcott on the taxonomy of orchids.

He was a member of the Botanical Society of London. His author abbreviation in botanical nomenclature is Knowles.

== Publications ==
- 1838. Knowles, GB; F Westcott. The Floral Cabinet & Magazine of Exotic Botany. 3 vols.
