= Frederic Westcott =

Frederic Westcott (died 1861) was an English botanist. He worked in close cooperation with George Beauchamp Knowles on the taxonomy of orchids.

== Publications ==
- 1838. Westcott, F; GB Knowles. The Floral Cabinet & Magazine of Exotic Botany. Volume I: Illustrated × A Green.
- 1840. Knowles, GB; F Westcott. The Floral Cabinet, & Magazine of Exotic Botany. Londres: Ed. William Smith, vol. III, 47 litografías coloreadas a mano
