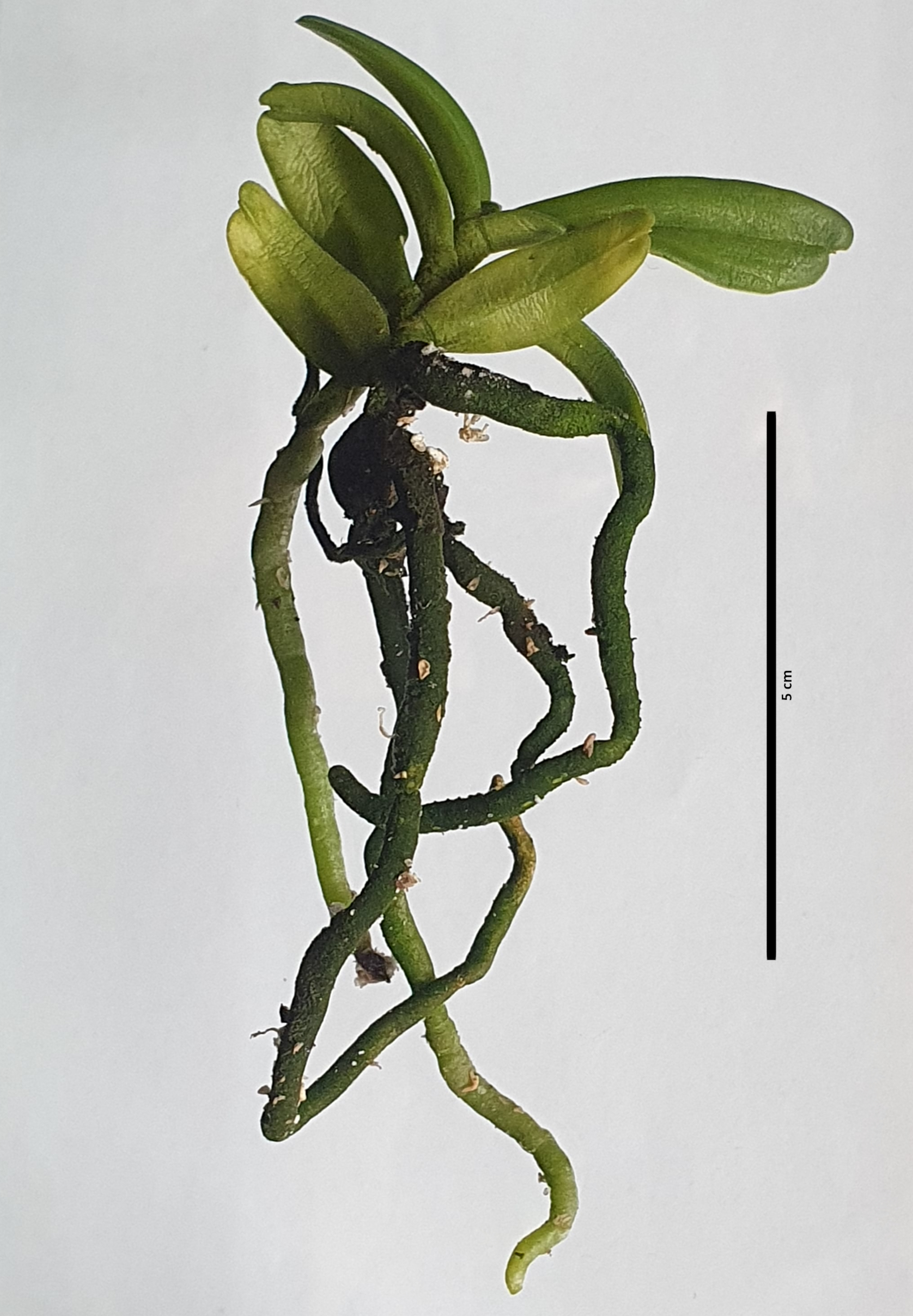
- Cymbilabia undulata seedling with scale bar (5 cm)
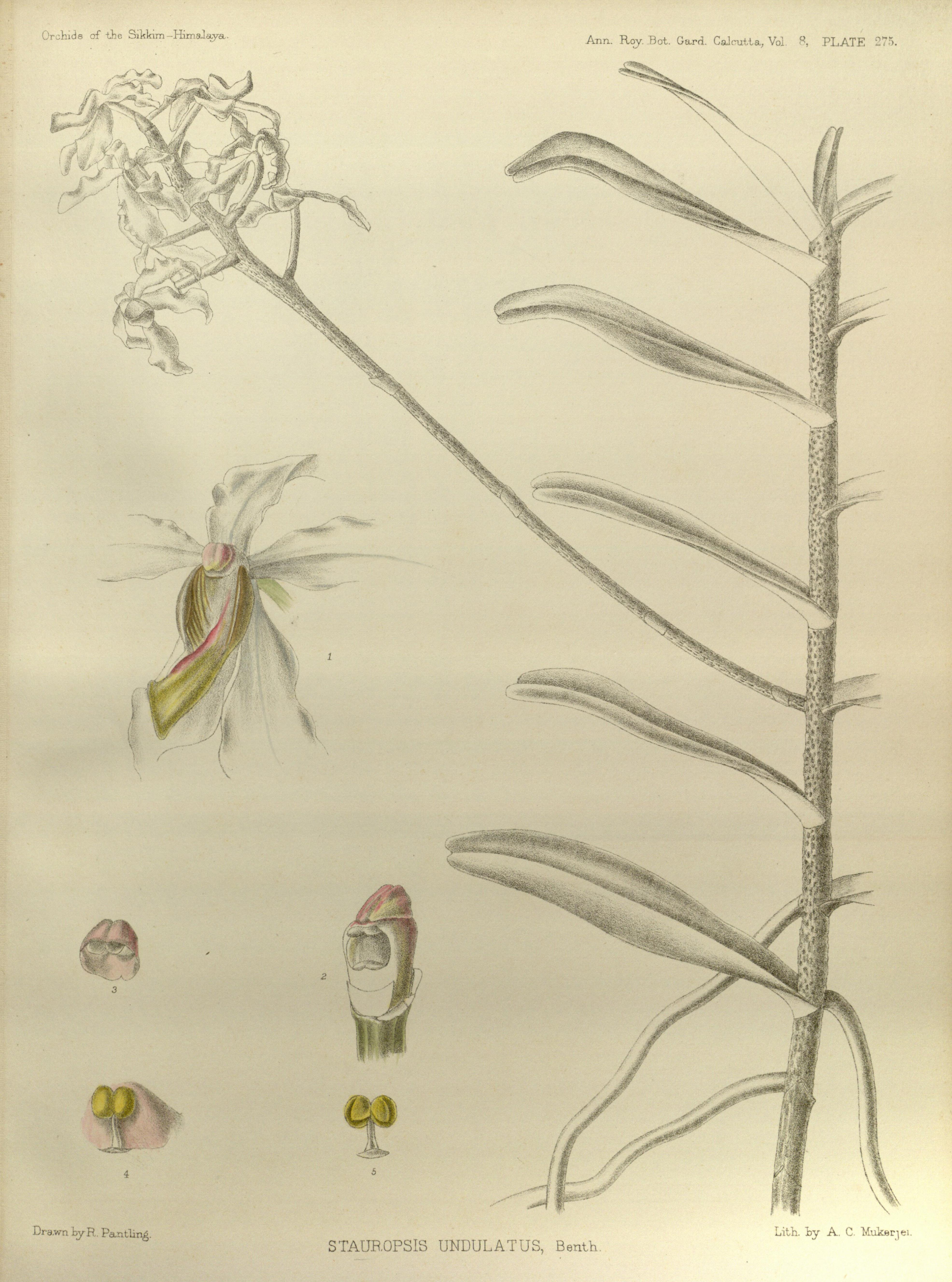
- Botanical illustration of Cymbilabia undulata

Scientific classification
- Kingdom: Plantae
- Clade: Tracheophytes
- Clade: Angiosperms
- Clade: Monocots
- Order: Asparagales
- Family: Orchidaceae
- Subfamily: Epidendroideae
- Tribe: Vandeae
- Subtribe: Aeridinae
- Genus: Cymbilabia
- Species: C. undulata

Binomial name
- Cymbilabia undulata (Lindl.) D.K.Liu & Ming H.Li

Synonyms
- Fieldia undulata (Lindl.) Rchb.f.; Stauropsis polyantha W.W.Sm.; Stauropsis undulatus (Lindl.) Benth. ex Hook.f.; Vandopsis undulata (Lindl.) J.J.Sm.; Vanda undulata Lindl.

= Cymbilabia undulata =

Species of orchid

Cymbilabia undulata is a vandaceous species of epiphytic orchid native to the Bhutan, Myanmar, China, India and Nepal.

== Description ==
The petals and sepals of the fragrant, white flowers, have an undulate margin. The flowers are formed on panicles, which may reach up to 50 cm in length. The labellum is yellow and has numerous pink lines at the basal end. Waxy, leathery leaves are formed on an ascending or pendulous stem.

== Taxonomy ==
This species was recently transferred from Vandopsis to the newly erected genus Cymbilabia. It was erected as response to the discovery of the then paraphyletic nature of the genus Vandopsis, which would not have formed a monophyletic group under the inclusion of Cymbilabia undulata. After this initial transfer another former Vandopsis species, namely Vandopsis shanica, was transferred to Cymbilabia. Another species, namely Cymbilabia sourioudongii, has been proposed.

Both the generic name and the specific epithet refer to the floral morphology. The genus name Cymbilabia is derived from the Latin word cymba meaning "cup", "bowl" or "boat" and labium, which is the labellum. The specific epithet undulata refers to the undulate margin of petals and sepals.
