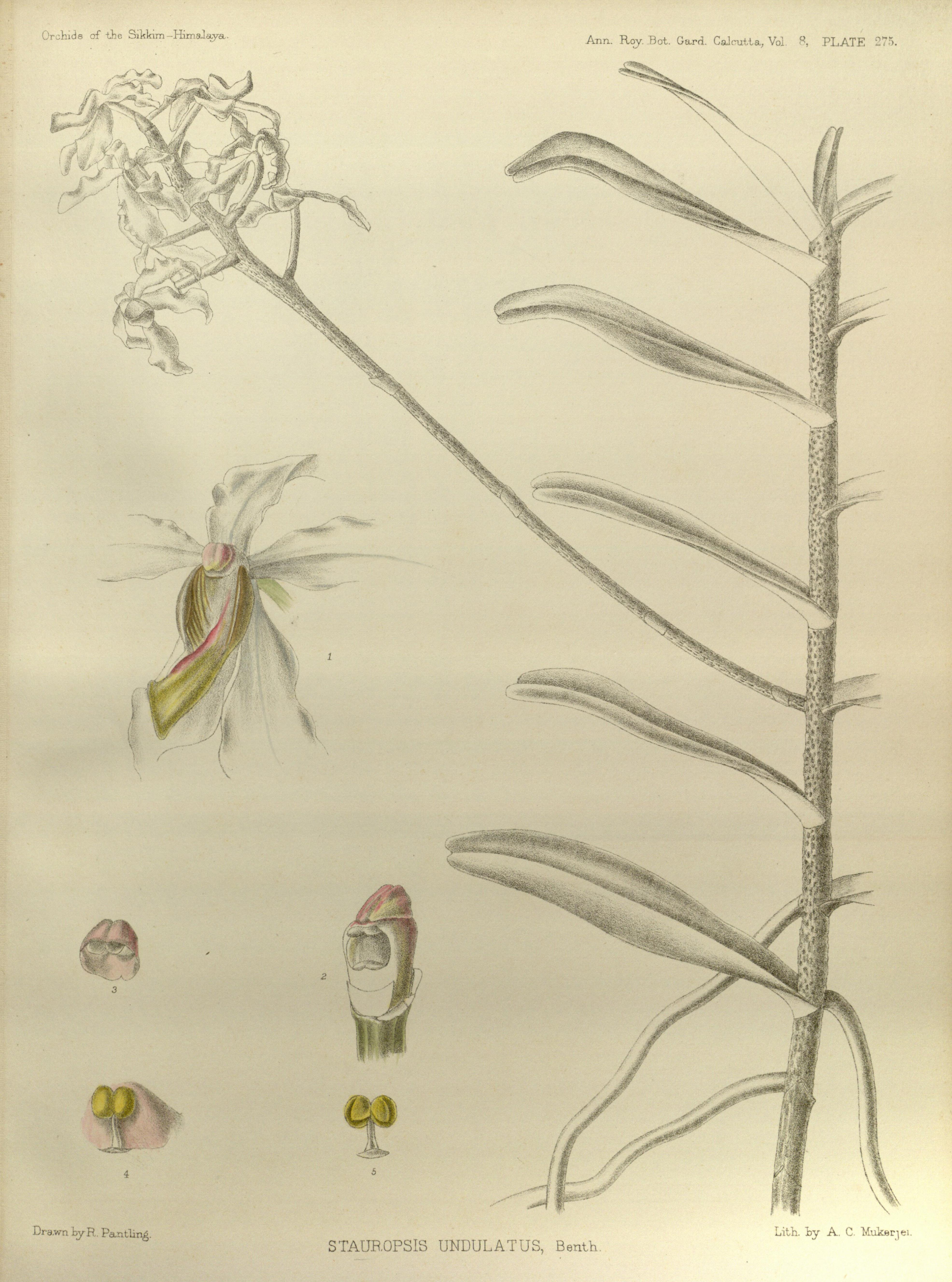
- Botanical illustration of Cymbilabia undulata

Scientific classification
- Kingdom: Plantae
- Clade: Tracheophytes
- Clade: Angiosperms
- Clade: Monocots
- Order: Asparagales
- Family: Orchidaceae
- Subfamily: Epidendroideae
- Tribe: Vandeae
- Subtribe: Aeridinae
- Genus: Cymbilabia; D.K.Liu & Ming H.Li

Species
- See text

= Cymbilabia =

Genus of plants

Cymbilabia is a genus of flowering plants in the family Orchidaceae.

== Taxonomy ==
The genus was established in 2020, as a result of the discovery of the paraphyletic nature of the genus Vandopsis as then circumscribed. Vandopsis would not have formed a monophyletic group with the inclusion of Cymbilabia undulata.

=== Species ===
As of January 2023, Plants of the World Online accepted the following species:

- Cymbilabia shanica (Phillim. & W.W.Sm.) Ormerod
- Cymbilabia sourioudongii Souvann. & Lanors.
- Cymbilabia undulata (Lindl.) D.K.Liu & Ming H.Li

== Distribution ==
Species of Cymbilabia are native from the Himalayas to China (west and south Yunnan) and northern Indo-China.
