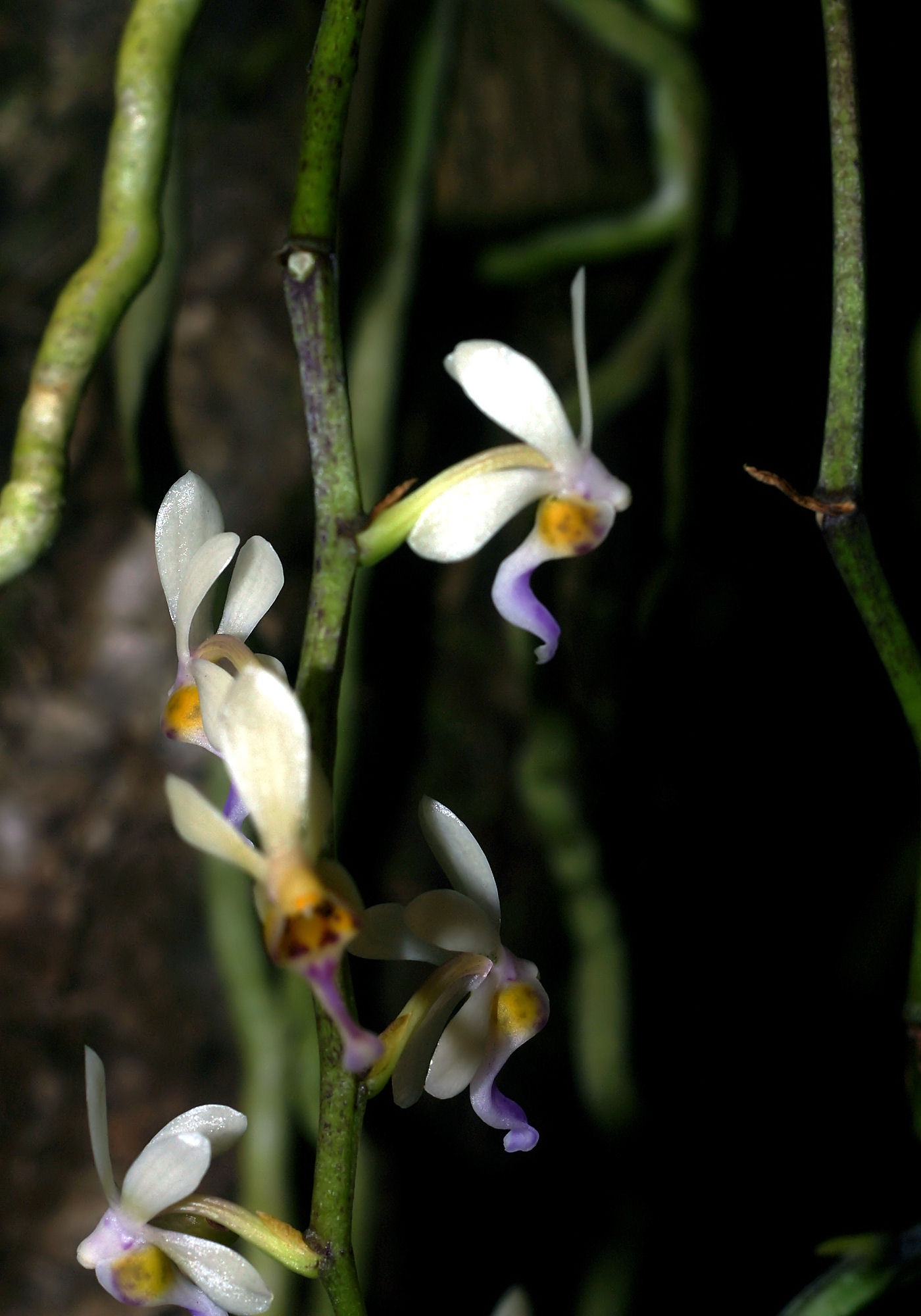
- Diploprora truncata

Scientific classification
- Kingdom: Plantae
- Clade: Tracheophytes
- Clade: Angiosperms
- Clade: Monocots
- Order: Asparagales
- Family: Orchidaceae
- Subfamily: Epidendroideae
- Tribe: Vandeae
- Subtribe: Aeridinae
- Genus: Diploprora; Hook.f.

Type species
- Diploprora championii (Lindl.) Hook.f.

= Diploprora =

Genus of orchids

Diploprora is a genus of flowering plants from the orchid family, Orchidaceae. It contains two recognized species, native to Asia:

- Diploprora championii (Lindl.) Hook.f. - India, Assam, Bhutan, Bangladesh, Myanmar, Sri Lanka, Thailand, Vietnam, Fujian, Guangxi, Hong Kong, Taiwan, Yunnan
- Diploprora truncata Rolfe ex Downie - Thailand, Arunachal Pradesh

It has been established, that Diploprora truncata is more closely related to Malleola baliensis, which is a synonym of Robiquetia aberrans (Schltr.) Kocyan & Schuit, than to the type species of the genus Diploprora championii. Thus, the genus is polyphyletic.

== See also ==
- List of Orchidaceae genera
