= Hederorkis =

Scientific classification
- Kingdom: Plantae
- Clade: Tracheophytes
- Clade: Angiosperms
- Clade: Monocots
- Order: Asparagales
- Family: Orchidaceae
- Subfamily: Epidendroideae
- Tribe: Vandeae
- Subtribe: Polystachyinae
- Genus: Hederorkis; Thouars (1809)

Synonyms
- Scandederis Thouars (1822)

Genus of orchids

Hederorkis is a genus of flowering plants from the orchid family, Orchidaceae. It contains two known species, both native to islands in the Indian Ocean (Seychelles and Mauritius).

== Description ==
As opposed to Polystachya (the largest genus in the subtribe), Hederorkis lacks pseudobulbs. The inflorescence is lateral.

== Species ==
- Hederorkis scandederis Thouars (1822) - Mauritius, Réunion
- Hederorkis seychellensis Bosser (1976) - Aldabra, Seychelles

== See also ==
- List of Orchidaceae genera
