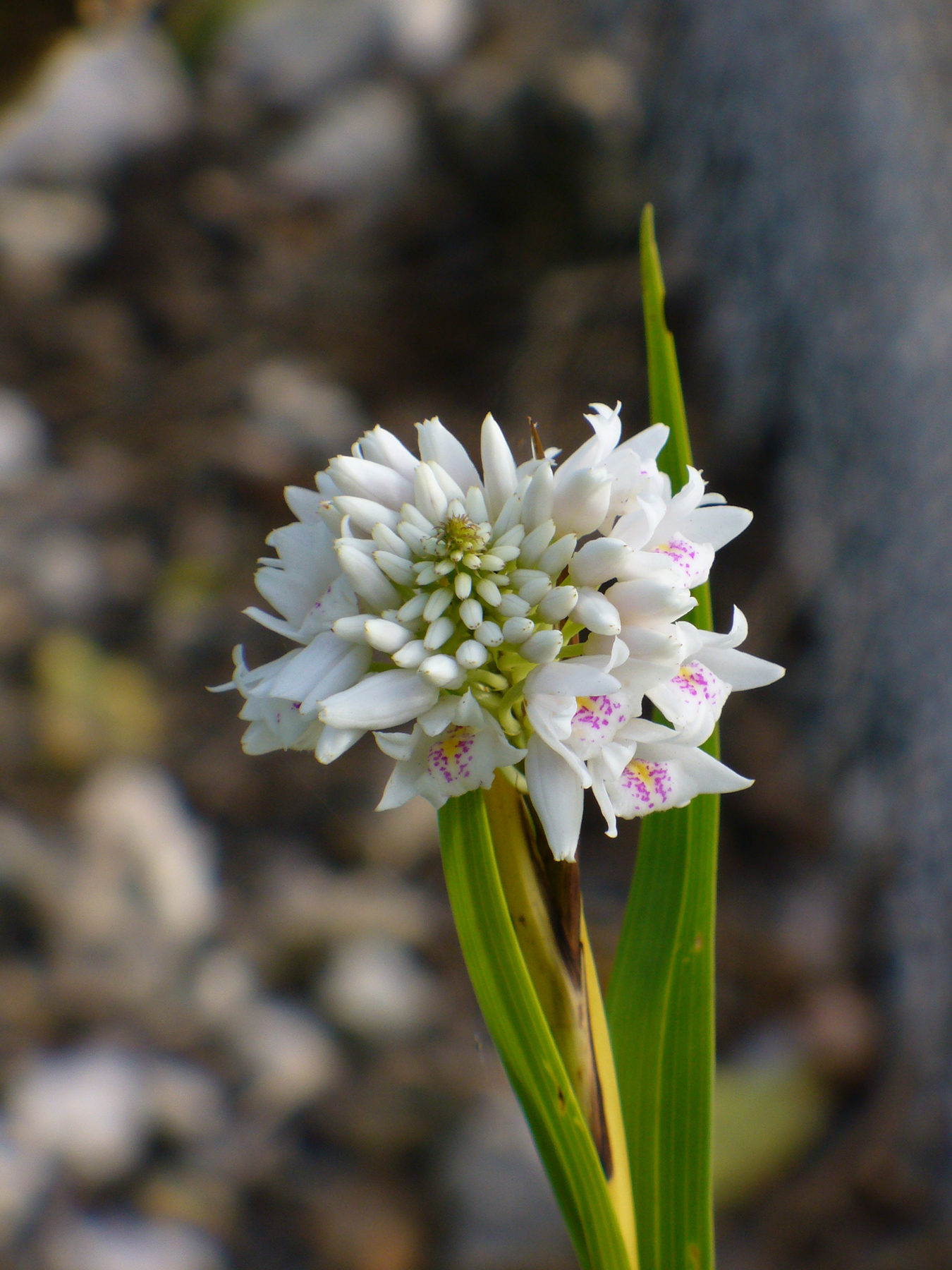
- Inflorescence of Polystachya neobenthamia
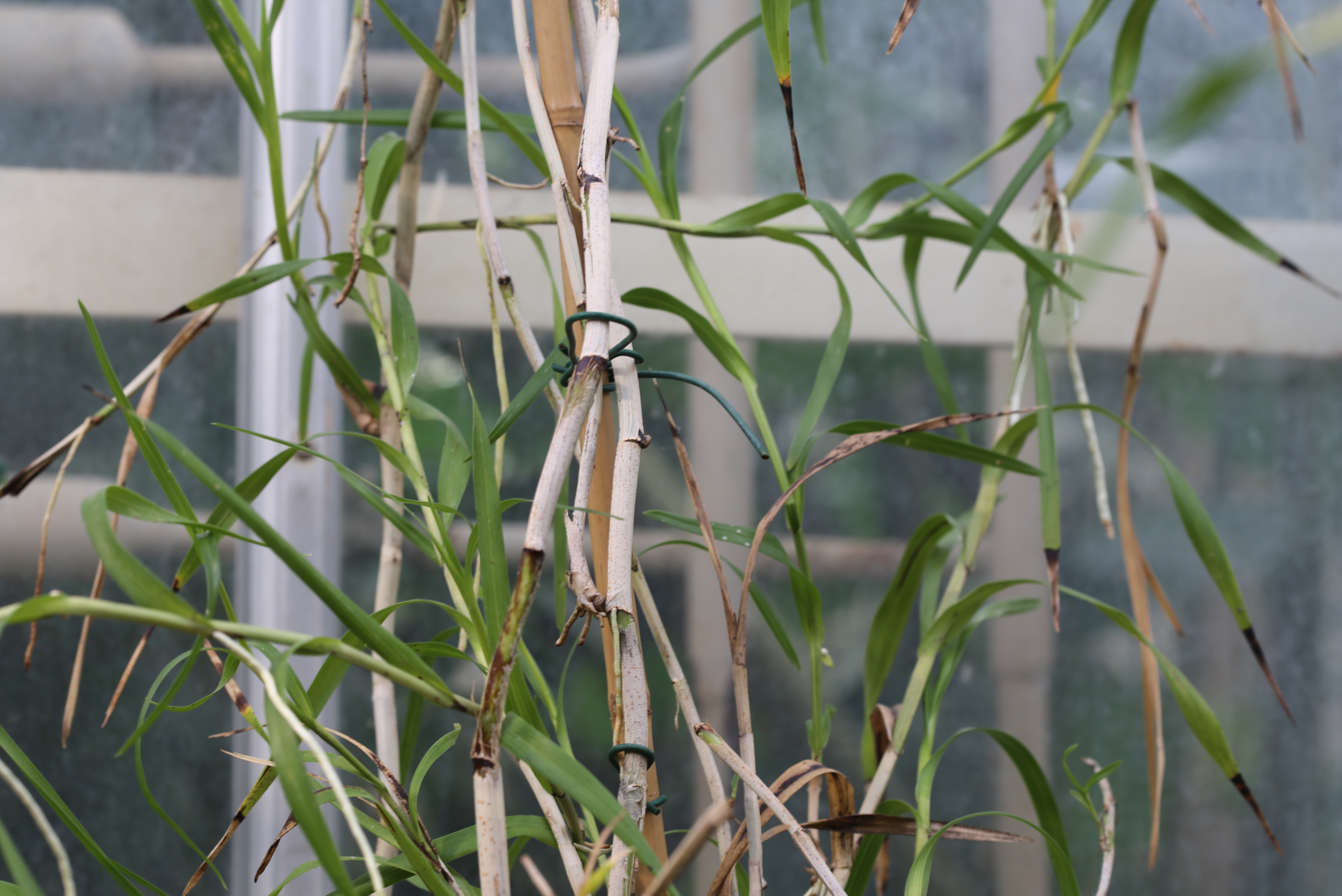
- Long, slender stems of Polystachya neobenthamia

Scientific classification
- Kingdom: Plantae
- Clade: Tracheophytes
- Clade: Angiosperms
- Clade: Monocots
- Order: Asparagales
- Family: Orchidaceae
- Subfamily: Epidendroideae
- Genus: Polystachya
- Species: P. neobenthamia

Binomial name
- Polystachya neobenthamia Schltr.

Synonyms
- Neobenthamia gracilis Rolfe; Polystachya holtzeana Kraenzl.

= Polystachya neobenthamia =

Species of orchids

Polystachya neobenthamia is a species of flowering plants from the orchid family, Orchidaceae. It is terrestrial, lithophilic and grows among leaf litter and other detritus on rock faces. It is endemic to Tanzania.

== Description ==
This species produces slender, reed-like stems, which bear distichously arranged, linear leaves. The inflorescence is erect and the rachis is bent apically. The flowers have four laterally flattened pollinia. The pollinia are relatively hard.

== Taxonomy ==
It was formerly placed in a separate, monotypic genus Neobenthamia Rolfe under the name Neobenthamia gracilis Rolfe. This is however now a synonym of Polystachya neobenthamia Schltr. Under the inclusion of P. neobenthamia the genus Polystachya is a monophyletic group. This species is the sister group to Polystachya dendrobiiflora.
