= Polystachya superposita =

Conservation status
- Endangered (IUCN 2.3)

Scientific classification
- Kingdom: Plantae
- Clade: Tracheophytes
- Clade: Angiosperms
- Clade: Monocots
- Order: Asparagales
- Family: Orchidaceae
- Subfamily: Epidendroideae
- Genus: Polystachya
- Species: P. superposita

Binomial name
- Polystachya superposita Rchb.f.

Species of orchid

Polystachya superposita is a species of flowering plant in the orchid family, Orchidaceae. It is native to Equatorial Guinea. It is also found in Cameroon, where it is thought to be an introduced species. This forest epiphyte is threatened by habitat destruction as forest land is cleared.
