= Polystachya cooperi =

Conservation status
- Endangered (IUCN 3.1)

Scientific classification
- Kingdom: Plantae
- Clade: Tracheophytes
- Clade: Angiosperms
- Clade: Monocots
- Order: Asparagales
- Family: Orchidaceae
- Subfamily: Epidendroideae
- Genus: Polystachya
- Species: P. cooperi

Binomial name
- Polystachya cooperi Summerh.

Species of orchid

Polystachya cooperi is a species of flowering plant in the orchid family, Orchidaceae. It is native to Cameroon and Nigeria. It grows in forests and woodlands. Most populations are threatened with habitat loss as forests are cleared.
