= Polystachya elegans =

Scientific classification
- Kingdom: Plantae
- Clade: Tracheophytes
- Clade: Angiosperms
- Clade: Monocots
- Order: Asparagales
- Family: Orchidaceae
- Subfamily: Epidendroideae
- Genus: Polystachya
- Species: P. elegans

Binomial name
- Polystachya elegans Rchb.f., 1881

Synonyms
- Dendrorchis elegans (Rchb. f.) Kuntze; Dendrorkis elegans (Rchb.f.) Kuntze; Polystachya calyptrata Kraenzl.; Polystachya mannii Rolfe; Unguiculabia elegans (Rchb. f.) Szlach. & Mytnik, 2008

Species of orchid

Polystachya elegans is a species of orchid. It is found in Cameroon.
