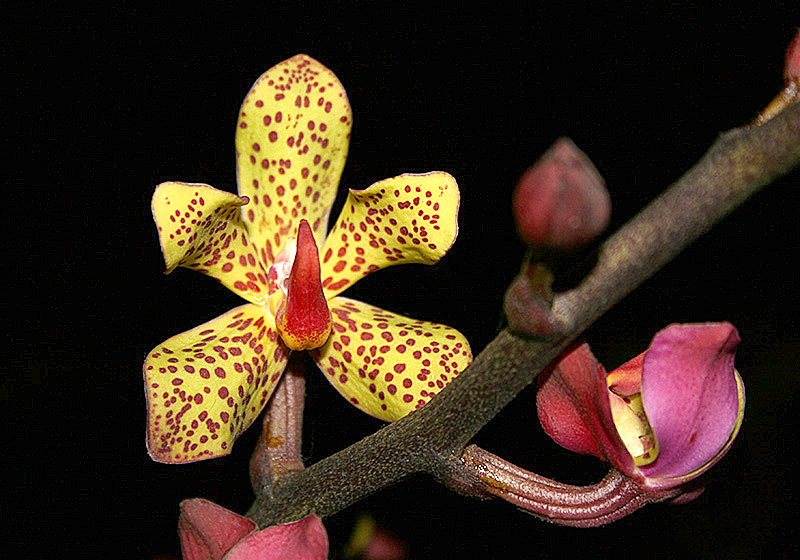

Scientific classification
- Kingdom: Plantae
- Clade: Tracheophytes
- Clade: Angiosperms
- Clade: Monocots
- Order: Asparagales
- Family: Orchidaceae
- Subfamily: Epidendroideae
- Tribe: Vandeae
- Subtribe: Aeridinae
- Genus: Vandopsis; Pfitzer

Species
- Vandopsis gigantea (Lindl.) Pfitzer; Vandopsis lissochiloides (Gaudich.) Pfitzer; Vandopsis shanica (Phillimore & W.W.Sm.) Garay

Synonyms
- Fieldia Gaudich.; Hyerochilus Pfitzer

= Vandopsis =

Genus of orchids

Vandopsis, abbreviated as Vdps in horticultural trade, is a genus of orchids in the family Orchidaceae. It contains ca. 5 species found in Southeast Asia, Southern China, the Philippines, and New Guinea. Recently Vandopsis undulata was excluded, as the genus would otherwise be paraphyletic. The species was transferred to the genus Cymbilabia.
