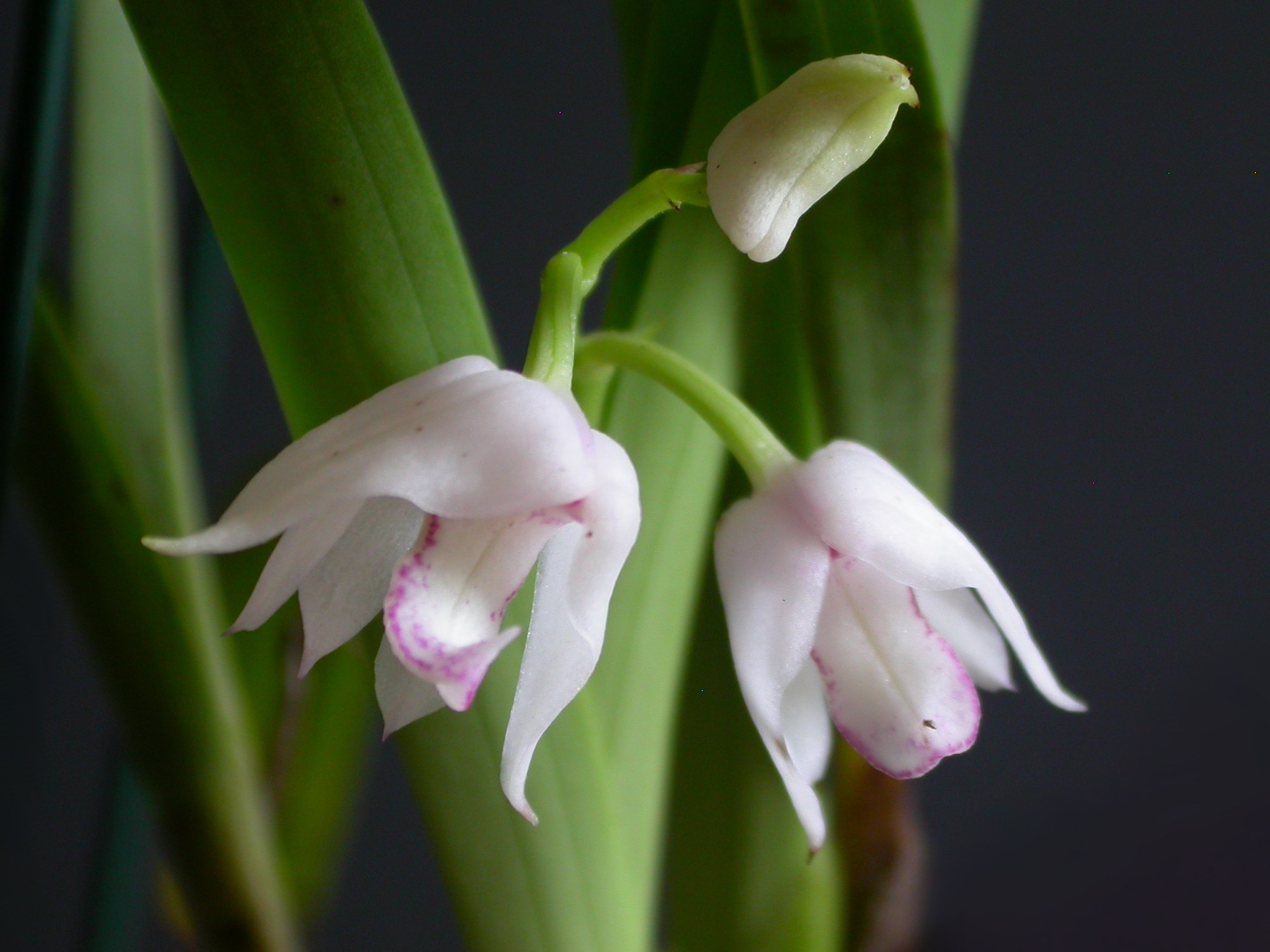
- Flower of Polystachya subdiphylla

Conservation status
- Endangered (IUCN 3.1)

Scientific classification
- Kingdom: Plantae
- Clade: Tracheophytes
- Clade: Angiosperms
- Clade: Monocots
- Order: Asparagales
- Family: Orchidaceae
- Subfamily: Epidendroideae
- Genus: Polystachya
- Species: P. subdiphylla

Binomial name
- Polystachya subdiphylla Summerh.

= Polystachya subdiphylla =

Species of orchid

Polystachya subdiphylla is a species of orchid native to Tanzania.

== Taxonomy and history ==
P. subdiphylla was described by English botanist V. S. Summerhayes in 1942 based on a single specimen collected in 1935. It is placed in Polystachya sect. Cultriformes on the basis of its single-leaved pseudobulbs.

== Distribution and habitat ==
P. subdiphylla is known only from the Nguru and Uluguru Mountains in Tanzania. It grows in montane forests around 2,000 m (6,600 ft) above sea level.

== Description ==
P. subdiphylla is a herbaceous plant growing 20–35 cm (7.9–13.8 in) tall. The conical pseudobulbs, each measuring 2–4 cm (0.79–1.57 in) long and 5–10 mm (0.20–0.39 in) wide, arise in clusters from a short, creeping rhizome. The leaves are lanceolate to ovate-lanceolate, measuring 15–25 cm (5.9–9.8 in) long and 1.1–1.7 cm (0.43–0.67 in) wide. The inflorescence is a simple raceme measuring 9.8–14 cm (3.9–5.5 in) long and bears up to 5 flowers. The flowers are mostly white, with red and yellow spotting on the labellum. The petals are obovate-lanceolate and measure 10–13.5 mm (0.39–0.53 in) long and 3.5–4 mm (0.14–0.16 in) wide. The dorsal sepal is lanceolate and measures 12–15.8 mm (0.47–0.62 in) long and 4.6–4.8 mm (0.18–0.19 in) wide. The lateral sepals are obliquely triangular and measure 10.5–16 mm (0.41–0.63 in) long and 7–9.5 mm (0.28–0.37 in) wide. The labellum is tri-lobed and strongly recurved, measuring 10–11.5 mm (0.39–0.45 in) long and 9.5–12.5 mm (0.37–0.49 in) wide with a covering of small hairs. The column measures 2–2.5 mm (0.079–0.098 in) long.

== Conservation status ==
P. subdiphylla is listed as endangered by the International Union for Conservation of Nature under criteria B1ab(iii) and B2ab(iii), based on the small number of locations at which this species is present and the threat of habitat decline. P. subdiphylla is present within the Nguru South Forest Reserve, a protected area in the Nguru Mountains, however, other populations occur in unprotected areas that are at risk of deforestation due to agriculture.
