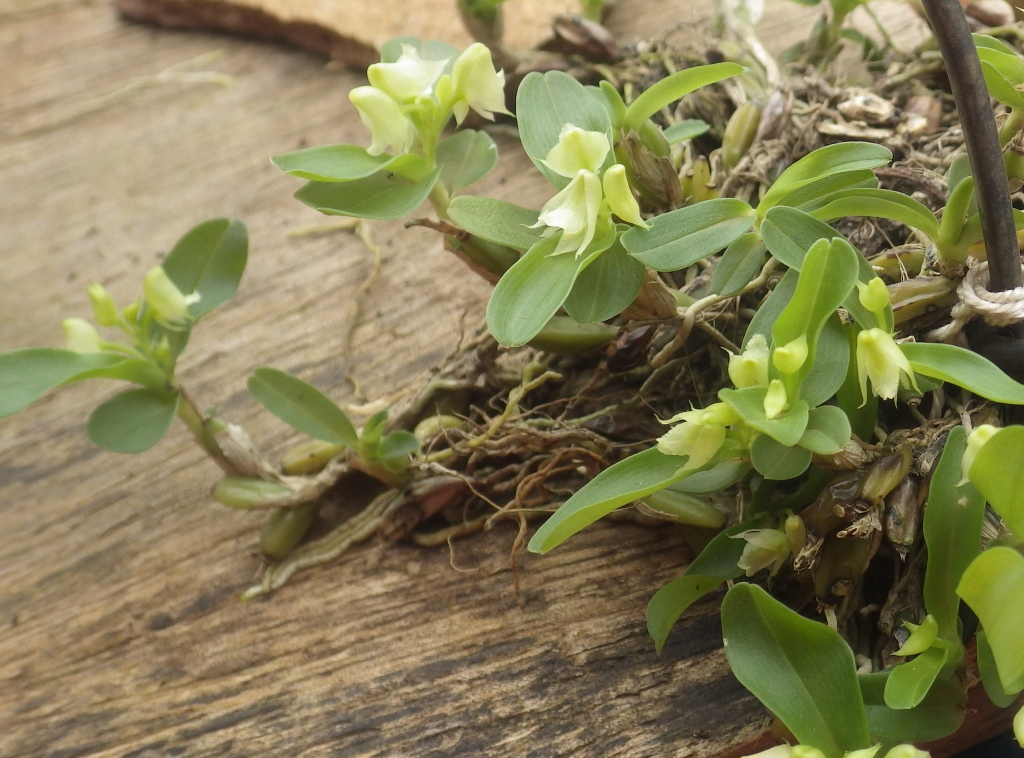
- Polystachya camaridioides, a member of the type genus Polystachya
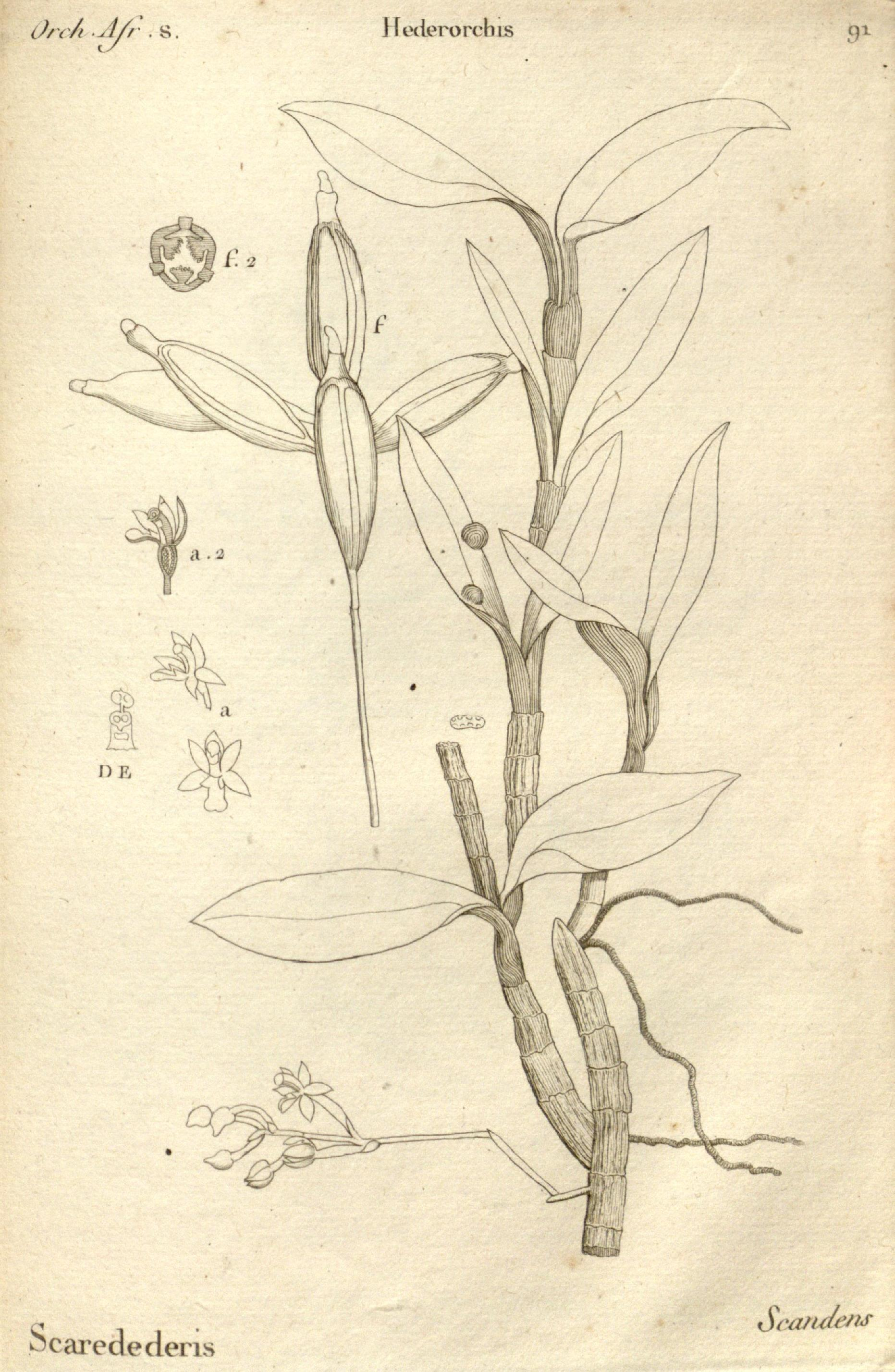
- Botanical illustration of Hederorkis scandederis, which is a member of the second genus (Hederorkis) of the subtribe

Scientific classification
- Kingdom: Plantae
- Clade: Embryophytes
- Clade: Tracheophytes
- Clade: Spermatophytes
- Clade: Angiosperms
- Clade: Monocots
- Order: Asparagales
- Family: Orchidaceae
- Subfamily: Epidendroideae
- Tribe: Vandeae
- Subtribe: Polystachyinae; Schlechter

Type genus
- Polystachya Hook.

= Polystachyinae =

Subtribe of orchids

Polystachyinae is a subtribe within the tribe Vandeae in family Orchidaceae. It consists of 2 genera and about 228 known species. The type genus of this subtribe is Polystachya. The group is pantropical, being native to tropical Africa primarily, but also to tropical America. Members of this group are epiphytic and are distinguished from the other subtribes in the tribe Vandeae by their sympodial growth habit and the presence of four pollinia. Pollination is mostly by small species of bees, however some species (e.g. Polystachya concrete) exhibit auto-pollination.

== Genera ==
Genera in this subtribe are listed below:

- Hederorkis Thouars, 1809 (2 sp.)
- Polystachya Hook., 1824 (224 spp.)

== Phylogeny ==
The subtribe Polystachyinae is the sister group to the remaining subtribes of Vandeae s.l.:

- Vandeae s.l.
  - - - Aeridinae
      - Angraecinae (including Aerangidinae)
    - Adrorhizinae
  - Polystachyinae
