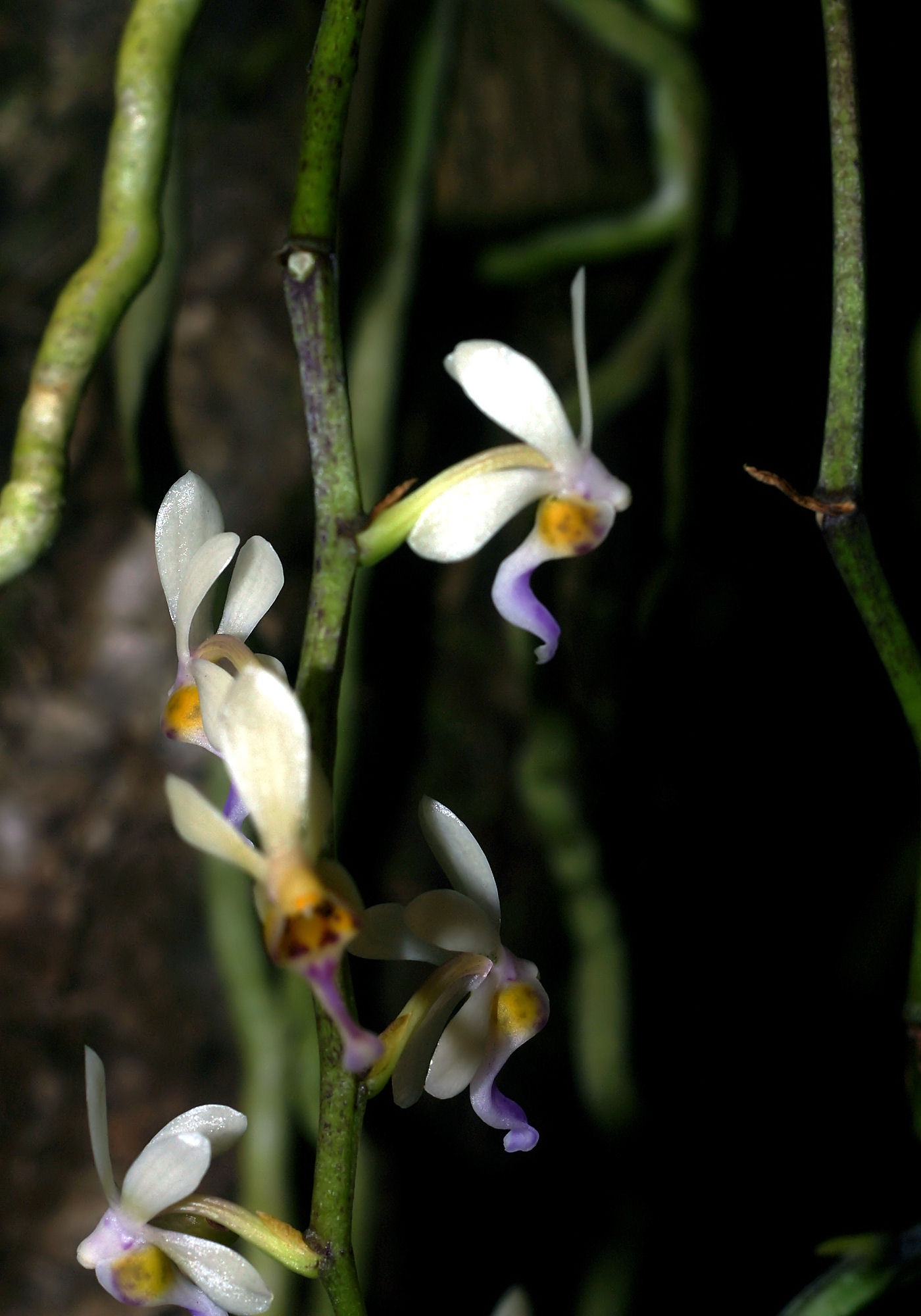
- inflorescence detail

Scientific classification
- Kingdom: Plantae
- Clade: Tracheophytes
- Clade: Angiosperms
- Clade: Monocots
- Order: Asparagales
- Family: Orchidaceae
- Subfamily: Epidendroideae
- Genus: Diploprora
- Species: D. truncata

Binomial name
- Diploprora truncata Rolfe ex Downie

Synonyms
- Stauropsis truncata (Rolfe ex Downie) Tang & F.T.Wang

= Diploprora truncata =

Species of epiphytic orchid

Diploprora truncata is a species of orchid native to East Himalaya and Thailand. Despite its placement within the genus Diploprora, it has been reported to be more closely related to Malleola baliensis, which is a synonym of Robiquetia aberrans (Schltr.) Kocyan & Schuit, than to the type species of the genus Diploprora championii. Thus, the genus is polyphyletic. The epiphytic plants have pendulous, monopodial stems, which bear distichously arranged, lanceolate leaves, which form sheaths around the stem. The widely spreading flowers are produced on lateral, laxly several flowered inflorescences.

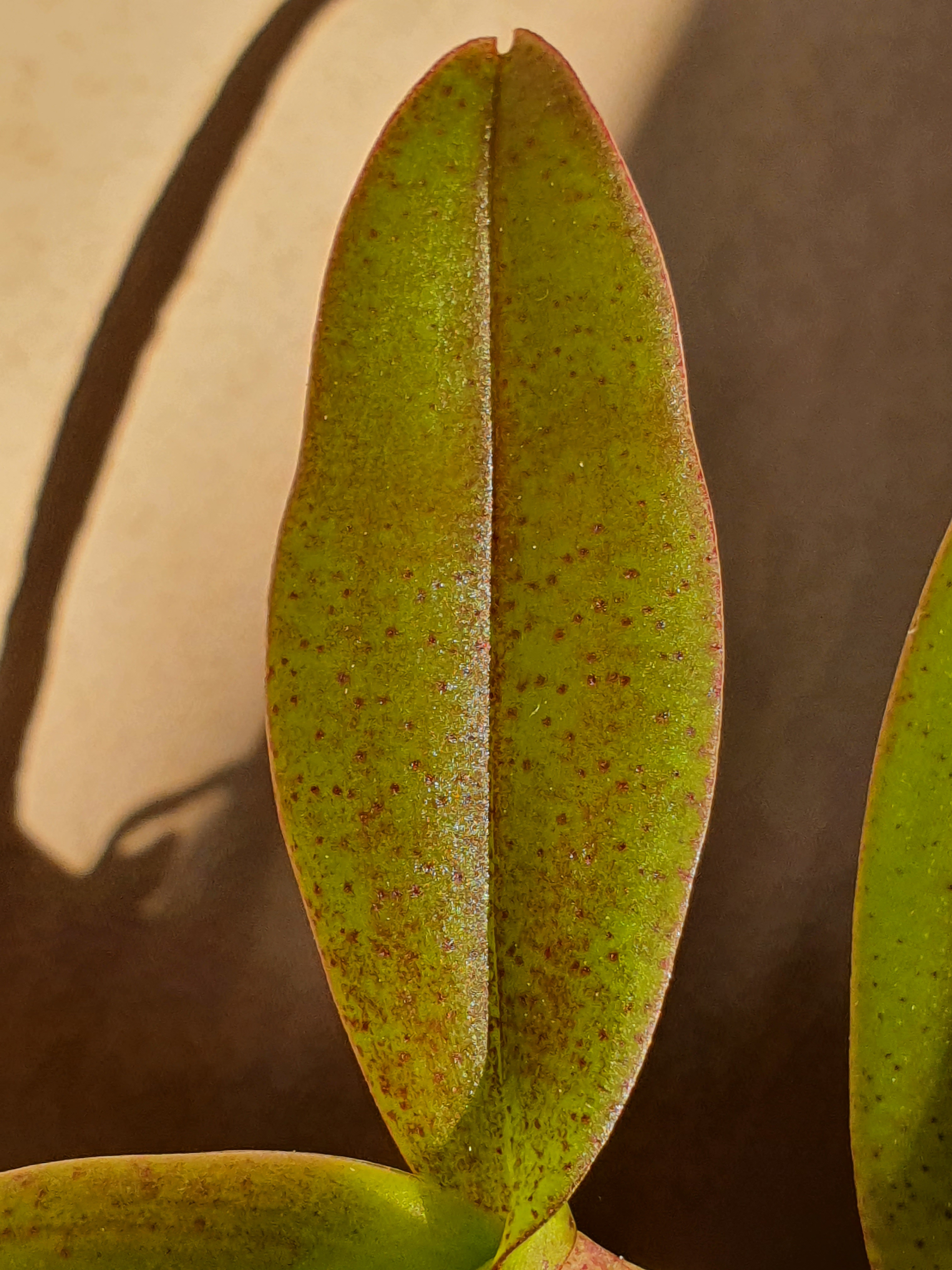
Leaf with purple spotting

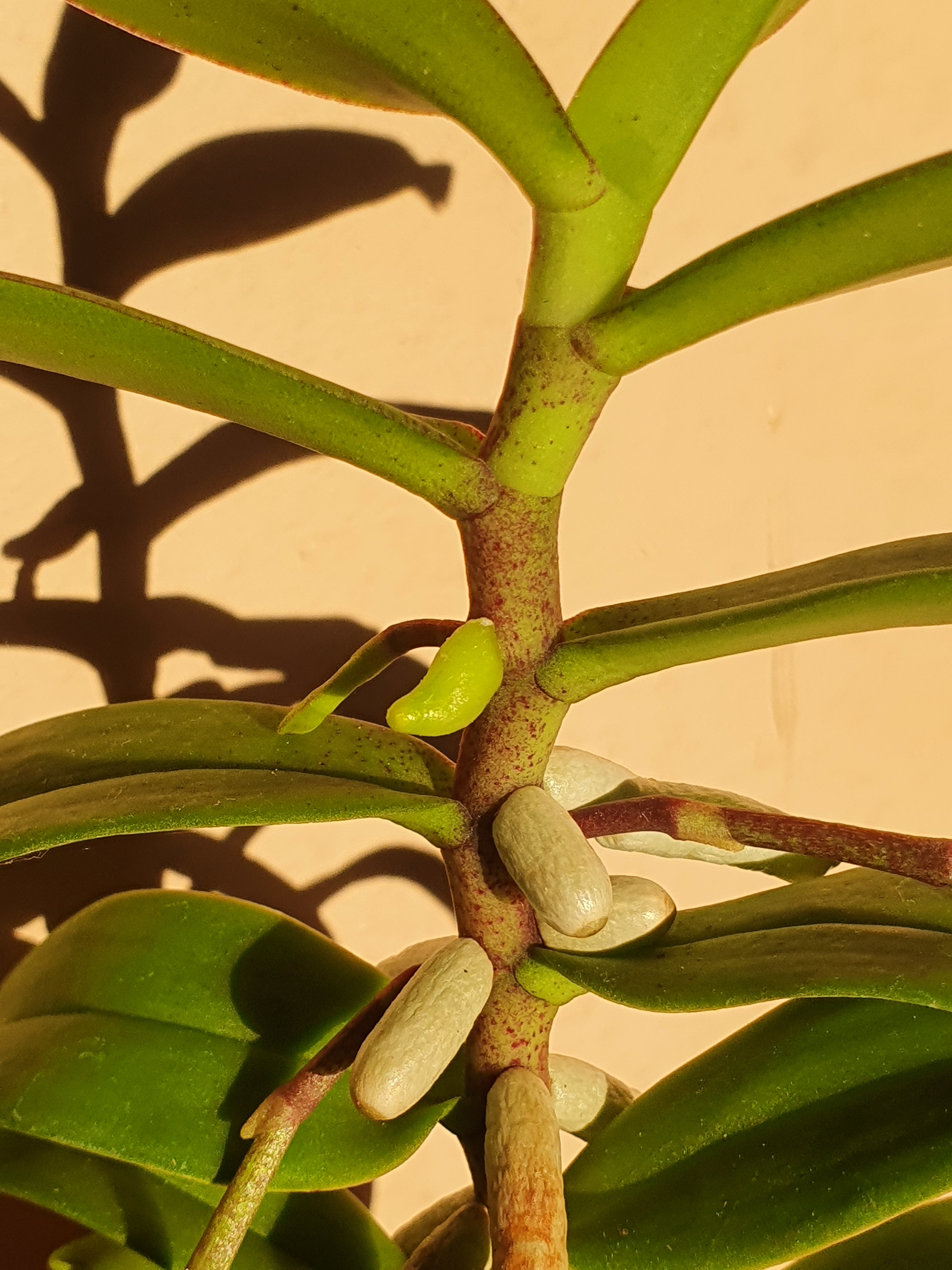
Emerging adventitious roots and inflorescences

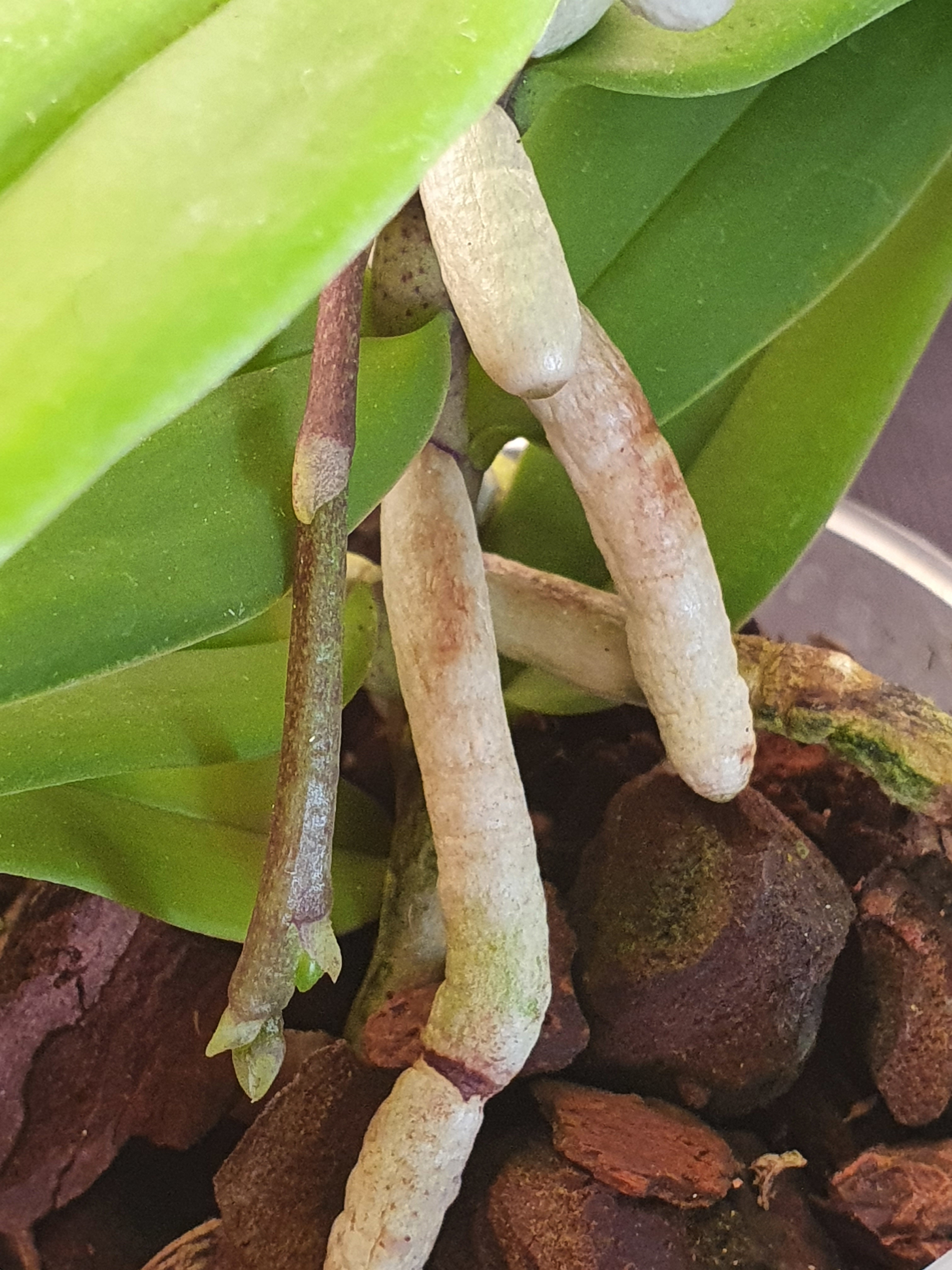
Developing pendent inflorescence

== Conservation ==
This species is protected under the CITES Appendix II regulations of international trade.
