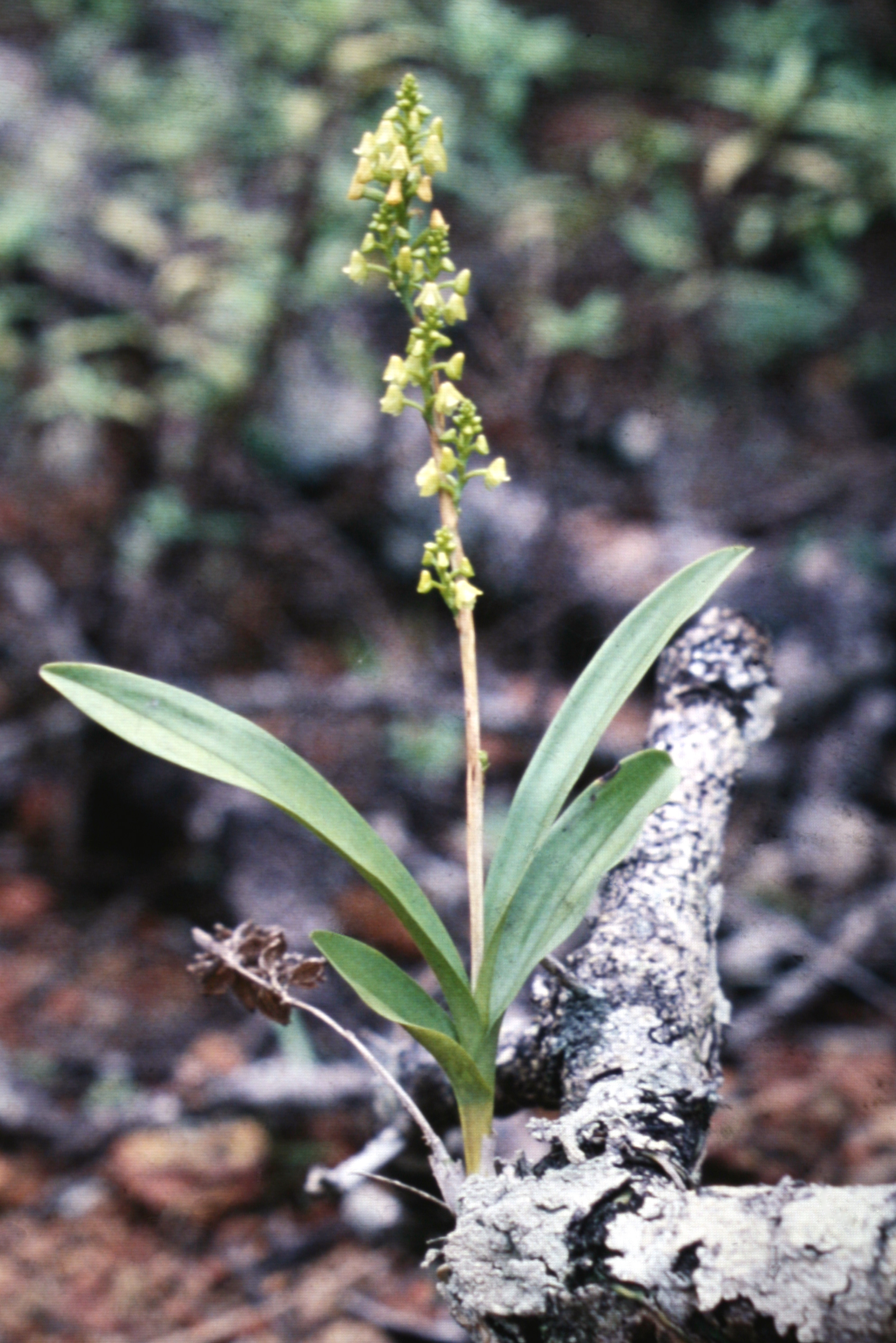
- Flower of Polystachya concreta

Scientific classification
- Kingdom: Plantae
- Clade: Embryophytes
- Clade: Tracheophytes
- Clade: Spermatophytes
- Clade: Angiosperms
- Clade: Monocots
- Order: Asparagales
- Family: Orchidaceae
- Subfamily: Epidendroideae
- Genus: Polystachya
- Species: P. concreta

Binomial name
- Polystachya concreta (Jacq.) Garay & H.R.Sweet

Synonyms
- See text

= Polystachya concreta =

Species of orchid

Polystachya concreta, the greater yellowspike orchid, is a species of orchid native to tropical and subtropical America, Africa and Asia.

== Synonyms ==
Epidendrum concretum Jacq. is the basionym. Other synonyms include:

- Callista flavescens (Lindl.) Kuntze
- Cranichis luteola Sw.
- Dendrobium flavescens Lindl.
- Dendrobium polystachyum Sw.
- Dendrorkis estrellensis (Rchb.f.) Kuntze
- Dendrorkis extinctoria (Rchb.f.) Kuntze
- Dendrorkis minuta (Aubl.) Kuntze
- Dendrorkis polystachyon (Sw.) Kuntze
- Dendrorkis purpurea (Wight) Kuntze
- Dendrorkis wightii (Rchb.f.) Kuntze
- Dendrorkis zollingeri (Rchb.f.) Kuntze
- Epidendrum concretum Jacq.
- Epidendrum minutum Aubl.
- Maxillaria luteola (Sw.) Beer
- Maxillaria purpurea (Wight) Beer
- Onychium flavescens Blume
- Polystachya bicolor Rolfe
- Polystachya caquetana Schltr.
- Polystachya colombiana Schltr.
- Polystachya cubensis Schltr.
- Polystachya estrellensis Rchb.f.
- Polystachya extinctoria Rchb.f.
- Polystachya flavescens (Blume) J.J.Sm.
- Polystachya kraenzliniana Pabst
- Polystachya luteola Hook.
- Polystachya luteola Wight
- Polystachya minuta (Aubl.) Frapp. ex Cordem.
- Polystachya penangensis Ridl.
- Polystachya pleistantha Kraenzl.
- Polystachya purpurea var. lutescens Gagnep.
- Polystachya purpurea Wight
- Polystachya reichenbachiana Kraenzl.
- Polystachya siamensis Ridl.
- Polystachya singapurensis Ridl.
- Polystachya wightii Rchb.f.
- Polystachya zeylanica Lindl.
- Polystachya zollingeri Rchb.f.
