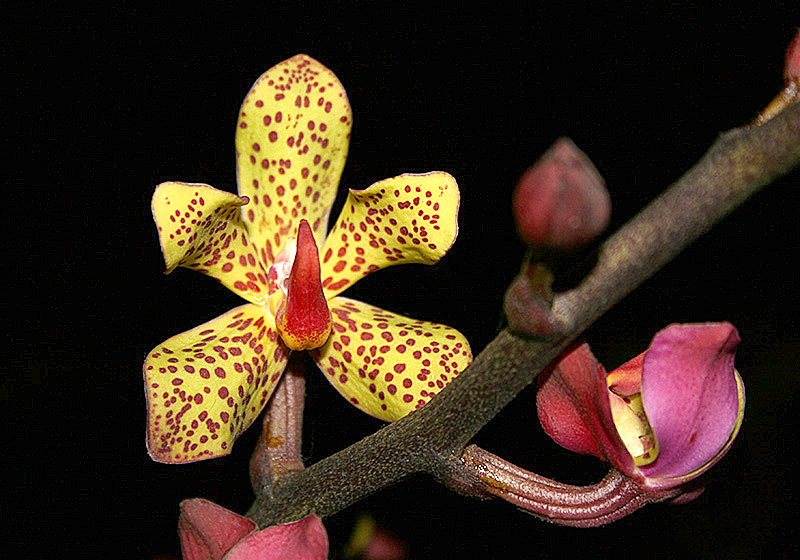

Scientific classification
- Kingdom: Plantae
- Clade: Tracheophytes
- Clade: Angiosperms
- Clade: Monocots
- Order: Asparagales
- Family: Orchidaceae
- Subfamily: Epidendroideae
- Genus: Vandopsis
- Species: V. lissochiloides

Binomial name
- Vandopsis lissochiloides (Gaudich.) Lindl. (1833)

Synonyms
- Vanda batemannii Lindl. (1846)

= Vandopsis lissochiloides =

Species of orchid

Vandopsis lissochiloides is a plant species in the genus Vandopsis, belonging to the orchid family (Orchidaceae). It has a unique combination of sharp yellow and toned pinkish back side.

== Characteristics ==
The robust stem can reach up to 2 m in height, or 80 inches. The leaves are stiff and leathery and up to one foot (30 cm) long. Gently perfumed, those textured flowers are about 7 cm across and last for several months.

== Habitat ==
It usually grows in the lowlands of the Philippines, but also in Thailand and Laos, and as far as New Guinea.
