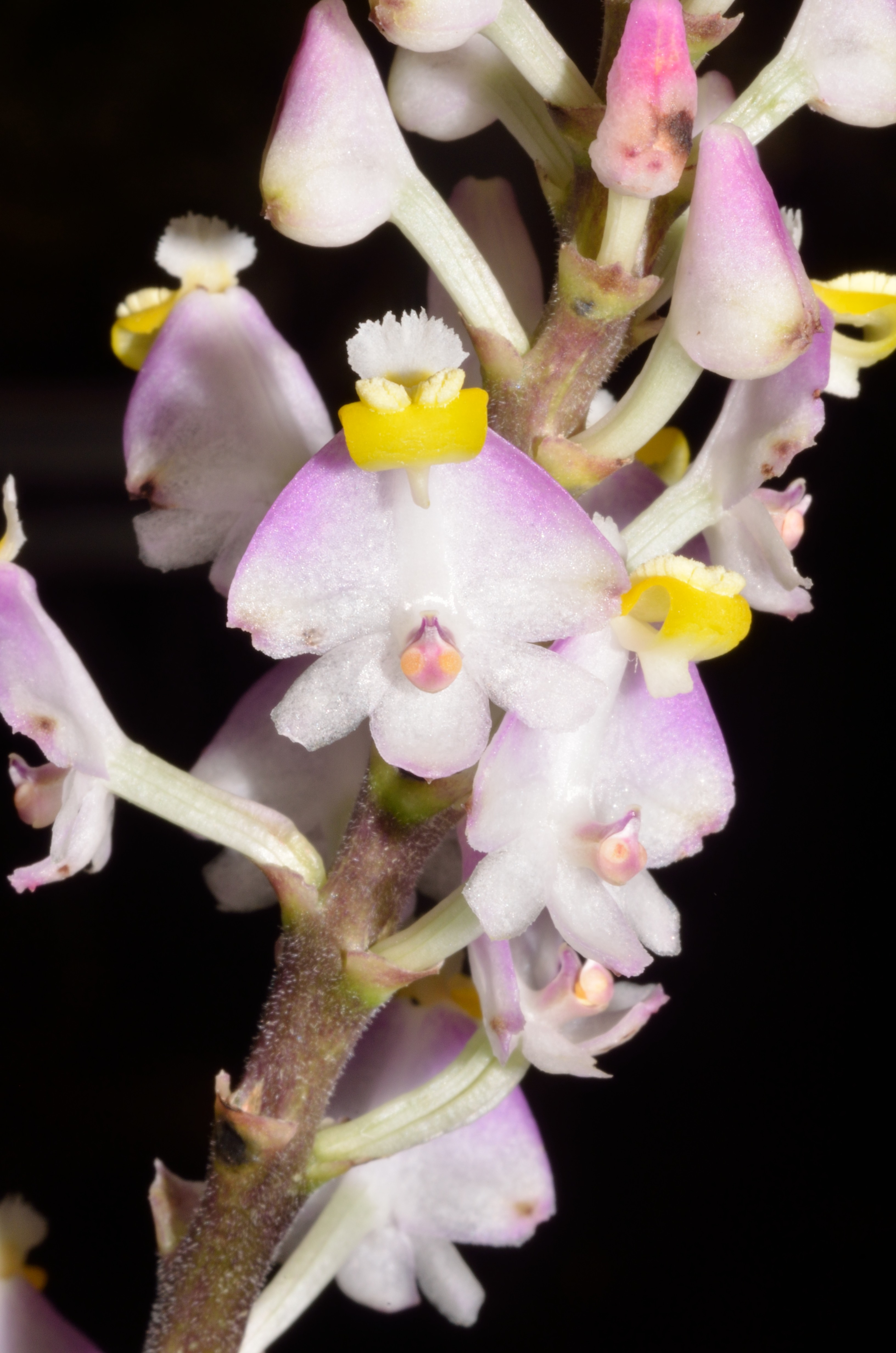

Conservation status
- Critically Endangered (IUCN 2.3)

Scientific classification
- Kingdom: Plantae
- Clade: Embryophytes
- Clade: Tracheophytes
- Clade: Spermatophytes
- Clade: Angiosperms
- Clade: Monocots
- Order: Asparagales
- Family: Orchidaceae
- Subfamily: Epidendroideae
- Genus: Polystachya
- Species: P. victoriae

Binomial name
- Polystachya victoriae Kraenzl.

= Polystachya victoriae =

Species of orchid

Polystachya victoriae is a species of plant in the family Orchidaceae. It is found in Cameroon and Gabon. Its natural habitat is subtropical or tropical dry forests. It is threatened by habitat loss.
