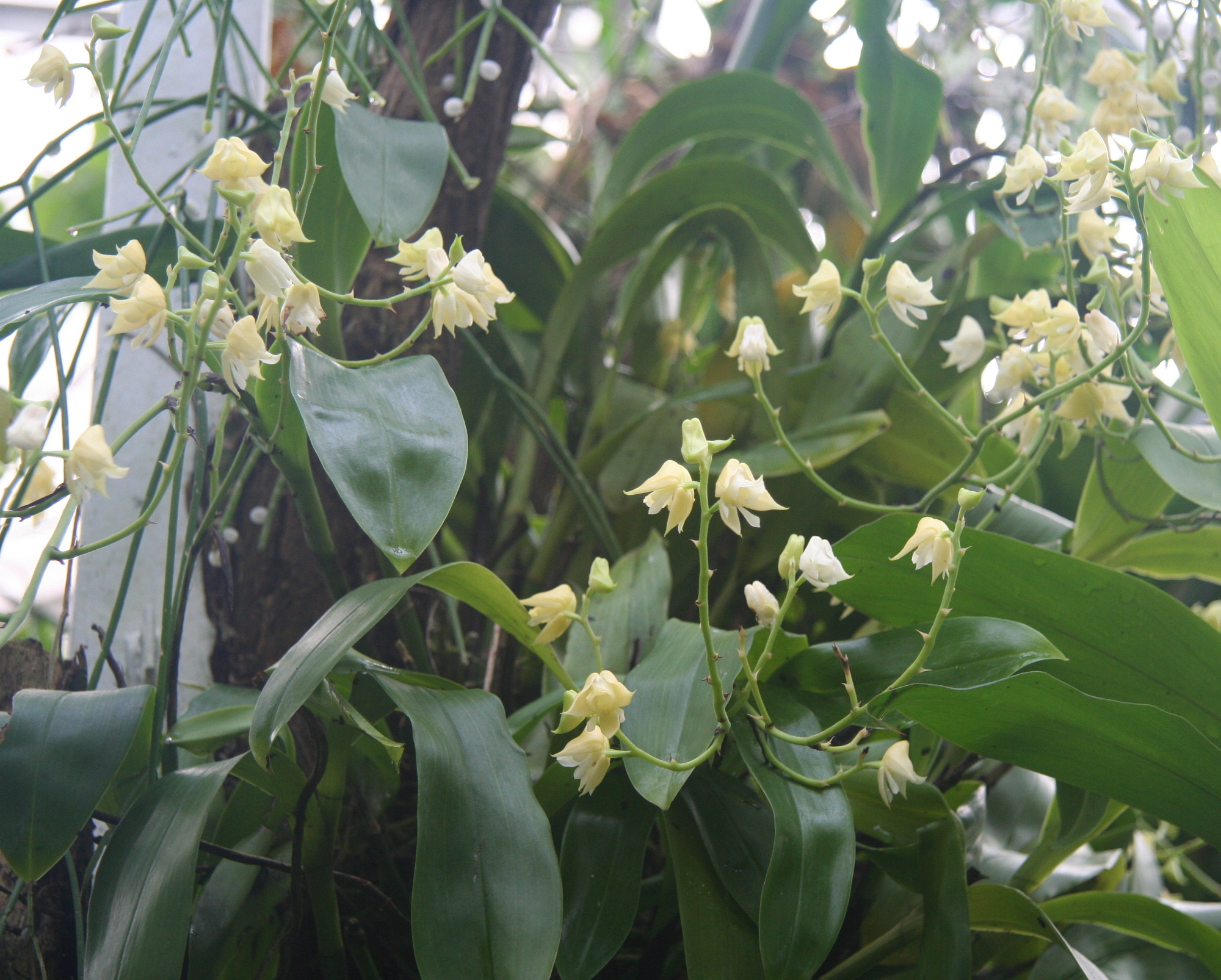
- Flower of Polystachya laxiflora

Scientific classification
- Kingdom: Plantae
- Clade: Embryophytes
- Clade: Tracheophytes
- Clade: Spermatophytes
- Clade: Angiosperms
- Clade: Monocots
- Order: Asparagales
- Family: Orchidaceae
- Subfamily: Epidendroideae
- Genus: Polystachya
- Species: P. laxiflora

Binomial name
- Polystachya laxiflora Lindl.

= Polystachya laxiflora =

Species of orchid

Polystachya laxiflora is a species of orchid native to western and west-central tropical Africa.

- Media related to Polystachya laxiflora at Wikimedia Commons
- Data related to Polystachya laxiflora at Wikispecies
