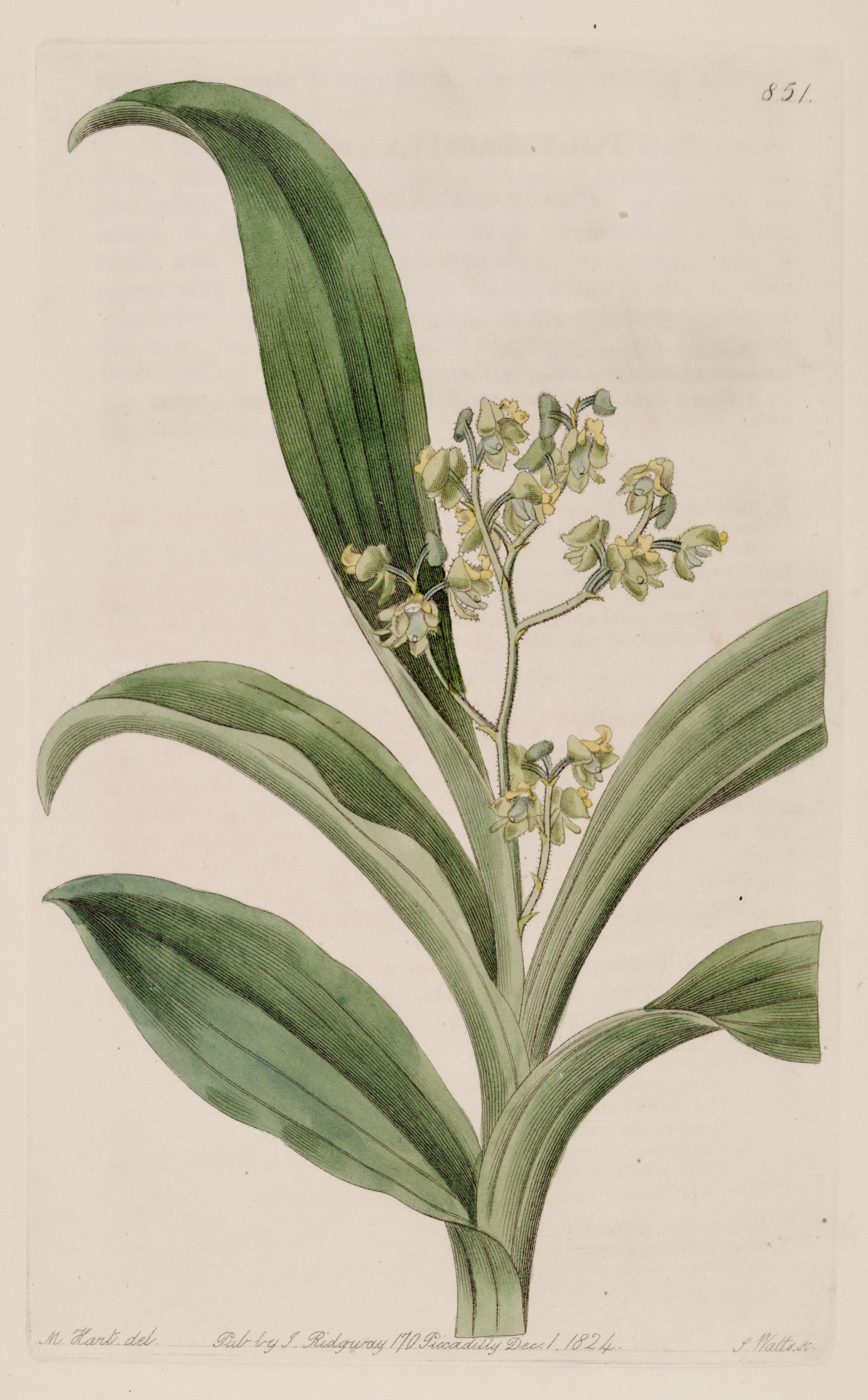
- Illustration of Polystachya puberula

Scientific classification
- Kingdom: Plantae
- Clade: Embryophytes
- Clade: Tracheophytes
- Clade: Spermatophytes
- Clade: Angiosperms
- Clade: Monocots
- Order: Asparagales
- Family: Orchidaceae
- Subfamily: Epidendroideae
- Genus: Polystachya
- Species: P. puberula

Binomial name
- Polystachya puberula Lindl.

Synonyms
- Dendrorkis puberula (Lindl.) Kuntze

= Polystachya puberula =

Species of orchid

Polystachya puberula is a species of orchid native to western and west-central tropical Africa.

== See also ==
- Media related to Polystachya puberula at Wikimedia Commons
- Data related to Polystachya puberula at Wikispecies
