= Polystachya geniculata =

Conservation status
- Endangered (IUCN 3.1)

Scientific classification
- Kingdom: Plantae
- Clade: Tracheophytes
- Clade: Angiosperms
- Clade: Monocots
- Order: Asparagales
- Family: Orchidaceae
- Subfamily: Epidendroideae
- Genus: Polystachya
- Species: P. geniculata

Binomial name
- Polystachya geniculata Summerh.

Species of orchid

Polystachya geniculata is a species of flowering plant in the orchid family, Orchidaceae. It is endemic to Cameroon. It is known from only two locations. It grows in the soil or on rocks.
