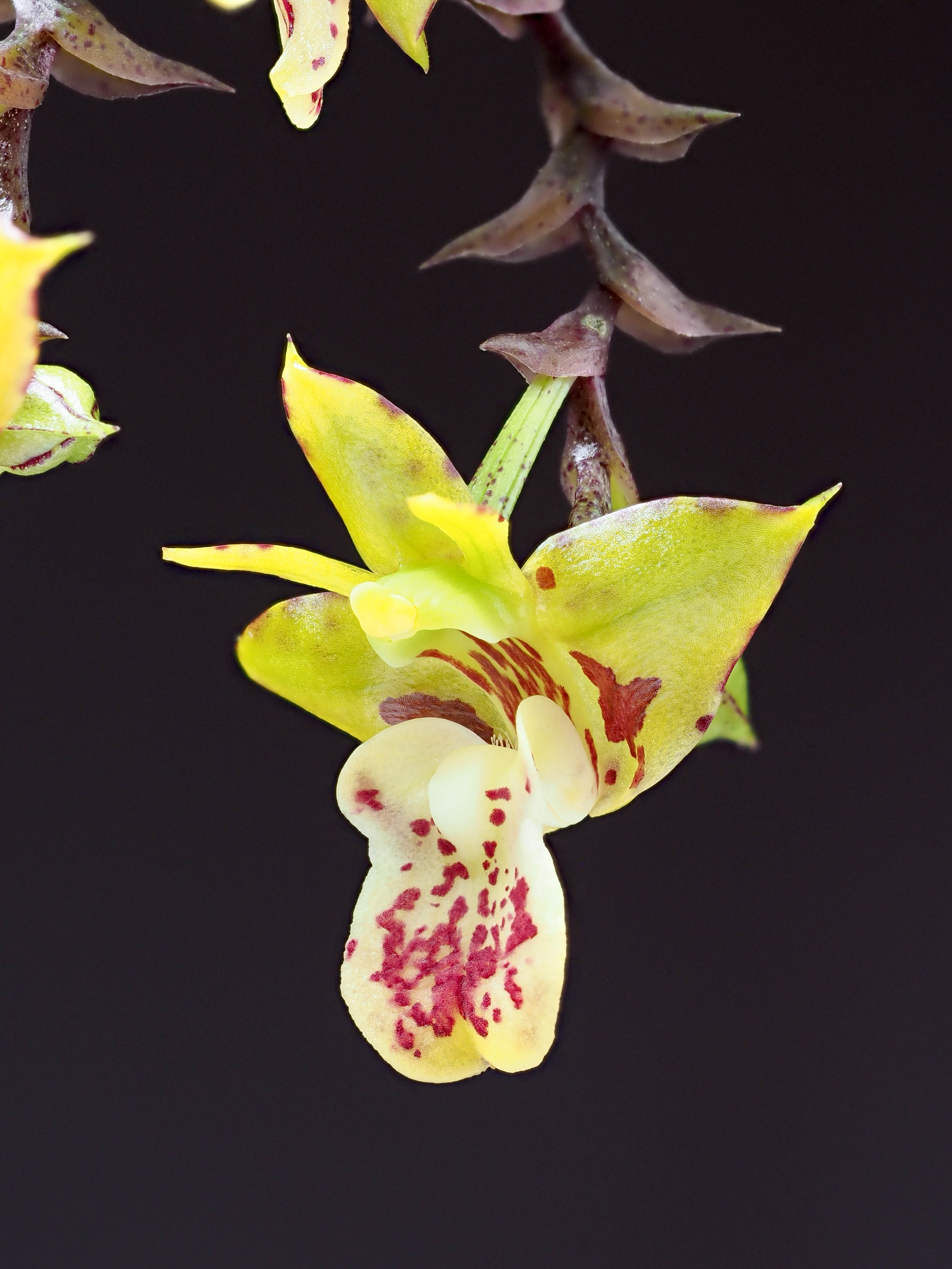
- Flower

Conservation status
- Critically Endangered (IUCN 3.1)

Scientific classification
- Kingdom: Plantae
- Clade: Embryophytes
- Clade: Tracheophytes
- Clade: Spermatophytes
- Clade: Angiosperms
- Clade: Monocots
- Order: Asparagales
- Family: Orchidaceae
- Subfamily: Epidendroideae
- Genus: Polystachya
- Species: P. maculata

Binomial name
- Polystachya maculata P.J.Cribb

= Polystachya maculata =

Species of orchid

Polystachya maculata is a species of orchid endemic to Burundi.
