= Polystachya bifida =

Scientific classification
- Kingdom: Plantae
- Clade: Tracheophytes
- Clade: Angiosperms
- Clade: Monocots
- Order: Asparagales
- Family: Orchidaceae
- Subfamily: Epidendroideae
- Genus: Polystachya
- Species: P. bifida

Binomial name
- Polystachya bifida Lindl.

Synonyms
- Dendrorkis bifida (Lindl.) Kuntze; Polystachya farinosa Kraenzl.

Species of plant

Polystachya bifida is a species of flowering plant in the family Orchidaceae, native from south-east Nigeria to west-central tropical Africa. It was first described by John Lindley in 1862.

== Distribution ==
Polystachya bifida is native to south-east Nigeria and large parts of west-central tropical Africa: Burundi, Cameroon, Equatorial Guinea, Gabon, the Gulf of Guinea islands, Rwanda and the Democratic Republic of the Congo.

== Conservation ==
Polystachya farinosa was assessed as "endangered" in the 2017 IUCN Red List, where it is said to be native only to Cameroon. As of February 2023, P. farinosa was regarded as a synonym of Polystachya bifida, which has a much wider distribution.
