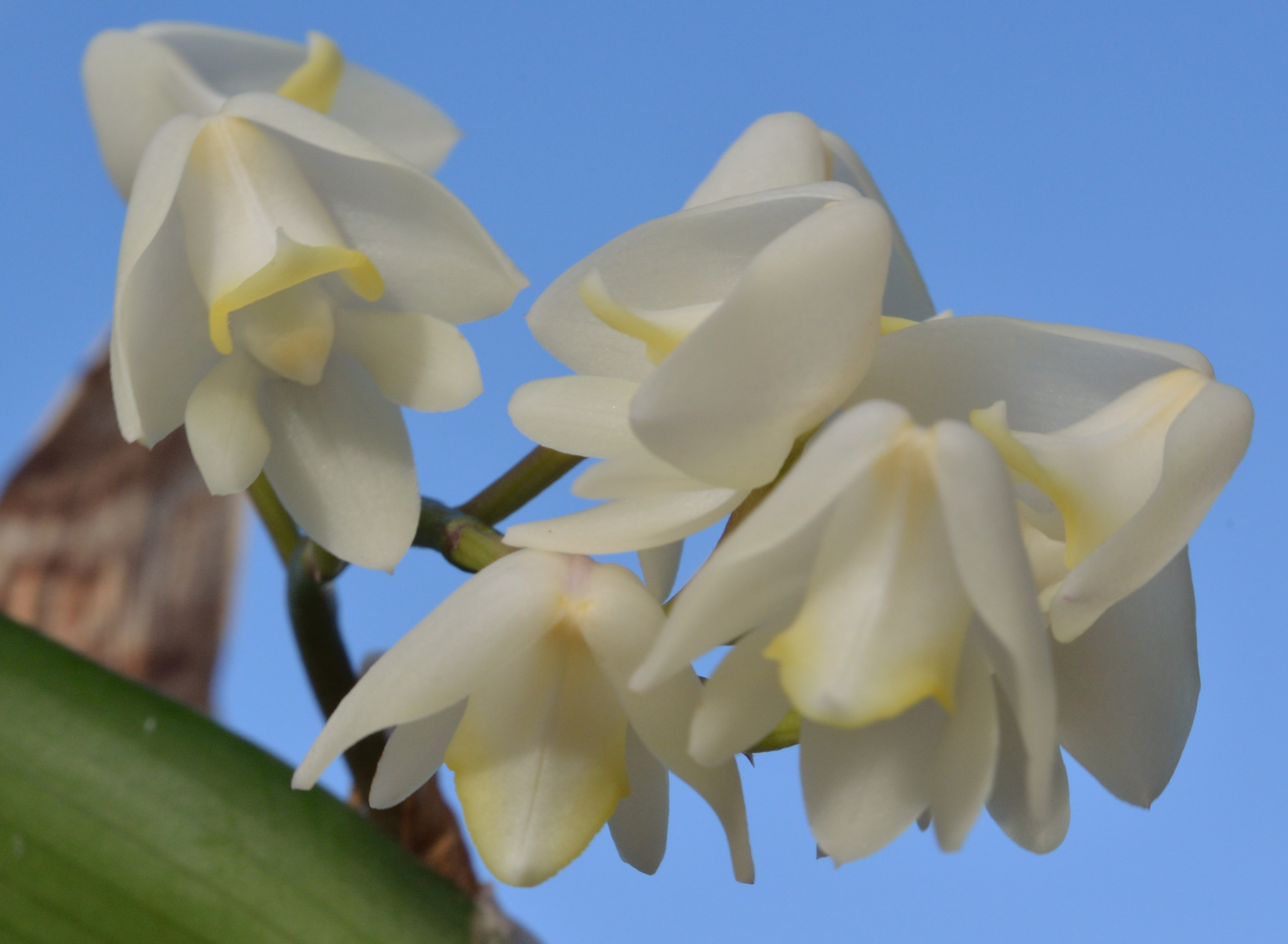

Conservation status
- Least Concern (IUCN 3.1)

Scientific classification
- Kingdom: Plantae
- Clade: Tracheophytes
- Clade: Angiosperms
- Clade: Monocots
- Order: Asparagales
- Family: Orchidaceae
- Subfamily: Epidendroideae
- Genus: Polystachya
- Species: P. virginea

Binomial name
- Polystachya virginea Summerh., Bot. Mus. Leafl. 10: 290

= Polystachya virginea =

Species of flowering plants

Polystachya virginea is a species of flowering plant in the family Orchidaceae. It is native from East Tropical Africa to West-Central Tropical Africa. Its natural habitat is subtropical or tropical forests.
