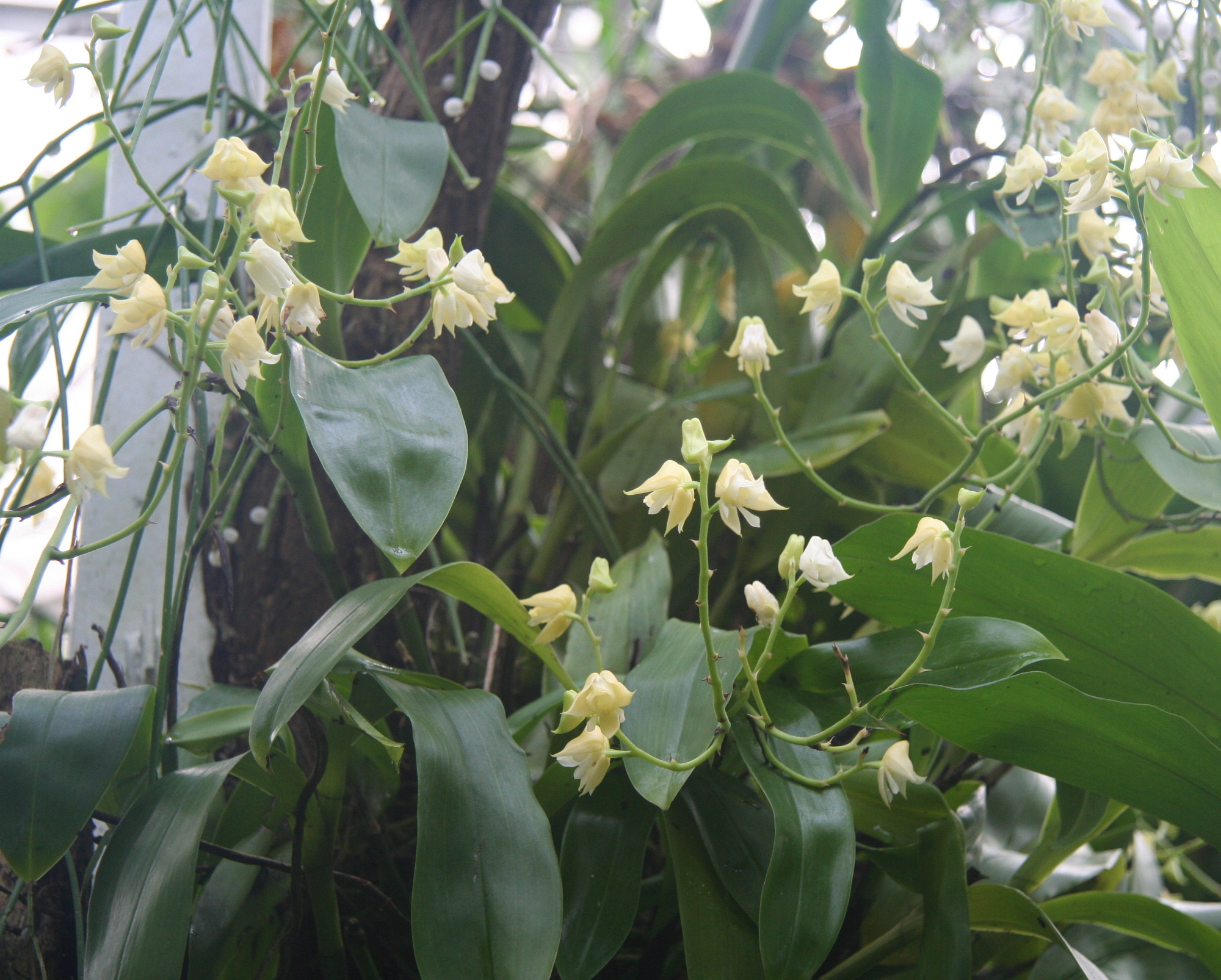
- Polystachya laxiflora

Scientific classification
- Kingdom: Plantae
- Clade: Embryophytes
- Clade: Tracheophytes
- Clade: Spermatophytes
- Clade: Angiosperms
- Clade: Monocots
- Order: Asparagales
- Family: Orchidaceae
- Subfamily: Epidendroideae
- Tribe: Vandeae
- Subtribe: Polystachyinae
- Genus: Polystachya; Hook.

Species
- About 100, see text

Synonyms
- Epiphora Lindl.; Nienokuea A. Chev.; Dendrorkis Thouars; Dendrorchis Thouars ex Kuntze; Neobenthamia Rolfe; Disperanthoceros Mytnik & Szlach.; Geerinckia Mytnik & Szlach.; Szlachetkoella Mytnik; Dendrobianthe (Schltr.) Mytnik; Epiphorella Mytnik & Szlach.; Unguiculabia Mytnik & Szlach.; Isochilostachya Mytnik & Szlach.; Neoburttia Mytnik, Szlach. & Baranow

= Polystachya =

Genus of orchids

Polystachya, abbreviated Pol in horticultural trade, and commonly known as yellowspike orchid, is a flowering plant genus in the orchid family (Orchidaceae). This rather distinctive genus was described by William Jackson Hooker in 1824 and is the type genus of the subtribe Polystachyinae. It contains about 100 species widespread across many of the tropical areas of the world.

== Species ==
Polystachya species accepted by the Plants of the World Online as of February 2021:

- Polystachya aconitiflora Summerh.
- Polystachya acridolens Summerh.
- Polystachya acuminata Summerh.
- Polystachya adansoniae Rchb.f.
- Polystachya aethiopica P.J.Cribb
- Polystachya affinis Lindl.
- Polystachya albescens Ridl.
- Polystachya alicjae Mytnik
- Polystachya alpina Lindl.
- Polystachya anastacialynae Eb.Fisch., Killmann, J.-P.Lebel & Delep.
- Polystachya anceps Ridl.
- Polystachya angularis Rchb.f.
- Polystachya anthoceros la Croix & P.J.Cribb
- Polystachya armeniaca la Croix & P.J.Cribb
- Polystachya asper P.J.Cribb & Podz.
- Polystachya aurantiaca Schltr.
- Polystachya bamendae Szlach., Baranow & Mytnik
- Polystachya bancoensis Burg
- Polystachya batkoi Szlach. & Olszewski
- Polystachya bella Summerh.
- Polystachya bennettiana Rchb.f.
- Polystachya bequaertii Summerh.
- Polystachya bicalcarata Kraenzl.
- Polystachya bicarinata Rendle
- Polystachya bifida Lindl.
- Polystachya bipoda Stévart
- Polystachya biteaui P.J.Cribb, la Croix & Stévart
- Polystachya boliviensis Schltr.
- Polystachya brassii Summerh.
- Polystachya bruechertiae Eb.Fisch., Killmann & J.-P.Lebel
- Polystachya brugeana Geerinck
- Polystachya caduca Rchb.f.
- Polystachya caespitifica Kraenzl.
- Polystachya caespitosa Barb.Rodr.
- Polystachya calluniflora Kraenzl.
- Polystachya caloglossa Rchb.f.
- Polystachya camaridioides Summerh.
- Polystachya campyloglossa Rolfe
- Polystachya canaliculata Summerh.
- Polystachya candida Kraenzl.
- Polystachya carnosa P.J.Cribb & Podz.
- Polystachya caudata Summerh.
- Polystachya cerea Lindl.
- Polystachya cingulata Rchb.f. ex Kraenzl.
- Polystachya clareae Hermans
- Polystachya clavata Lindl.
- Polystachya concreta (Jacq.) Garay & H.R.Sweet
- Polystachya confusa Rolfe
- Polystachya cooperi Summerh.
- Polystachya coriscensis Rchb.f.
- Polystachya cornigera Schltr.
- Polystachya cribbiana Geerinck
- Polystachya cultriformis (Thouars) Lindl. ex Spreng.
- Polystachya dalzielii Summerh.
- Polystachya danieliana G.W.Hu, W.C.Huang & Q.F.Wang
- Polystachya dendrobiiflora Rchb.f.
- Polystachya dewanckeliana Geerinck
- Polystachya disiformis P.J.Cribb
- Polystachya disticha Rolfe
- Polystachya doggettii Rendle & Rolfe
- Polystachya dolichophylla Schltr.
- Polystachya editae Eb.Fisch., Killmann, J.-P.Lebel, Delep. & Nzigid.
- Polystachya elastica Lindl.
- Polystachya elatior (Rchb.f.) Peraza & Carnevali
- Polystachya elegans Rchb.f.
- Polystachya engongensis Stévart & Droissart
- Polystachya epiphytica De Wild.
- Polystachya erica-lanzae Eb.Fisch., Killmann, J.-P.Lebel & Delep.
- Polystachya erythrocephala Summerh.
- Polystachya eurychila Summerh.
- Polystachya eurygnatha Summerh.
- Polystachya expansa Ridl.
- Polystachya fabriana Geerinck
- Polystachya fallax Kraenzl.
- Polystachya fischeri Rchb.f. ex Kraenzl.
- Polystachya foliosa (Hook.) Rchb.f.
- Polystachya fractiflexa Summerh.
- Polystachya fulvilabia Schltr.
- Polystachya fusiformis (Thouars) Lindl.
- Polystachya galeata (Sw.) Rchb.f.
- Polystachya geniculata Summerh.
- Polystachya geraensis Barb.Rodr.
- Polystachya goetzeana Kraenzl.
- Polystachya golungensis Rchb.f.
- Polystachya gracilenta Kraenzl.
- Polystachya greatrexii Summerh.
- Polystachya haroldiana Rolfe
- Polystachya hastata Summerh.
- Polystachya heckeliana Schltr.
- Polystachya heckmanniana Kraenzl.
- Polystachya henrici Schltr.
- Polystachya hoehneana Kraenzl.
- Polystachya holmesiana P.J.Cribb
- Polystachya hologlossa (P.J.Cribb & la Croix) Szlach. & Olszewski
- Polystachya holstii Kraenzl.
- Polystachya humbertii H.Perrier
- Polystachya isabelae Mytnik
- Polystachya isochiloides Summerh.
- Polystachya johnstonii Rolfe
- Polystachya jubaultii Pailler
- Polystachya kaluluensis P.J.Cribb & la Croix
- Polystachya kermesina Kraenzl.
- Polystachya kingii Summerh.
- Polystachya kornasiana Szlach. & Olszewski
- Polystachya kubalae Szlach. & Olszewski
- Polystachya kupensis P.J.Cribb & B.J.Pollard
- Polystachya lacroixiana Geerinck
- Polystachya laurentii De Wild.
- Polystachya lawalreeana Geerinck
- Polystachya lawrenceana Kraenzl.
- Polystachya laxa R.Schust.
- Polystachya laxiflora Lindl.
- Polystachya lejolyana Stévart
- Polystachya leonardiana Geerinck
- Polystachya leonensis Rchb.f.
- Polystachya letouzeyana Szlach. & Olszewski
- Polystachya leucosepala P.J.Cribb
- Polystachya ligulifolia Summerh.
- Polystachya lindblomii Schltr.
- Polystachya lineata Rchb.f.
- Polystachya longiscapa Summerh.
- Polystachya lukwangulensis P.J.Cribb
- Polystachya macropoda Summerh.
- Polystachya maculata P.J.Cribb
- Polystachya mafingensis P.J.Cribb
- Polystachya magnibracteata P.J.Cribb
- Polystachya malilaensis Schltr.
- Polystachya masayensis Rchb.f.
- Polystachya mazumbaiensis P.J.Cribb & Podz.
- Polystachya melanantha Schltr.
- Polystachya melliodora P.J.Cribb
- Polystachya meyeri P.J.Cribb & Podz.
- Polystachya microbambusa Kraenzl.
- Polystachya mildbraedii Kraenzl.
- Polystachya minima Rendle
- Polystachya modesta Rchb.f.
- Polystachya moniquetiana Stévart & Geerinck
- Polystachya monolenis Summerh.
- Polystachya monophylla Schltr.
- Polystachya moreauae P.J.Cribb & Podz.
- Polystachya mukandaensis De Wild.
- Polystachya mystacioides De Wild.
- Polystachya mzuzuensis P.J.Cribb & la Croix
- Polystachya × nebulicola G.McDonald & McMurtry
- Polystachya neobenthamia Schltr.
- Polystachya ngomensis G.McDonald & McMurtry
- Polystachya nyanzensis Rendle
- Polystachya obanensis Rendle
- Polystachya oblanceolata Summerh.
- Polystachya odorata Lindl.
- Polystachya oreocharis Schltr.
- Polystachya orophila Stévart & E.Bidault
- Polystachya ottoniana Rchb.f.
- Polystachya pachychila Summerh.
- Polystachya pamelae Eb.Fisch., Killmann & Nsanz.
- Polystachya paniculata (Sw.) Rolfe
- Polystachya parva Summerh.
- Polystachya parviflora Summerh.
- Polystachya paulensis Rchb.f.
- Polystachya pergibbosa H.Perrier
- Polystachya perrieri Schltr.
- Polystachya piersii P.J.Cribb
- Polystachya pinicola Barb.Rodr.
- Polystachya pobeguinii (Finet) Rolfe
- Polystachya pocsii P.J.Cribb
- Polystachya poikilantha Kraenzl.
- Polystachya polychaete Kraenzl.
- Polystachya porphyrochila J.Stewart
- Polystachya praecipitis Summerh.
- Polystachya principia Stévart & P.J.Cribb
- Polystachya proterantha P.J.Cribb
- Polystachya pseudodisa Kraenzl.
- Polystachya puberula Lindl.
- Polystachya pubescens (Lindl.) Rchb.f.
- Polystachya pudorina P.J.Cribb
- Polystachya purpureobracteata P.J.Cribb & la Croix
- Polystachya pyramidalis Lindl.
- Polystachya ramulosa Lindl.
- Polystachya reflexa Lindl.
- Polystachya reticulata Stévart & Droissart
- Polystachya retusiloba Summerh.
- Polystachya rhodochila Schltr.
- Polystachya rhodoptera Rchb.f.
- Polystachya riomuniensis Stévart & Nguema
- Polystachya rivae Schweinf.
- Polystachya rolfeana Kraenzl.
- Polystachya rosea Ridl.
- Polystachya rosellata Ridl.
- Polystachya rugosilabia Summerh.
- Polystachya ruwenzoriensis Rendle
- Polystachya rydingii Baranow & Mytnik
- Polystachya saccata (Finet) Rolfe
- Polystachya samilae Eb.Fisch., Killmann, J.-P.Lebel & Delep.
- Polystachya sandersonii Harv.
- Polystachya seidenfadeniana Mytnik & Baranow
- Polystachya serpentina P.J.Cribb
- Polystachya seticaulis Rendle
- Polystachya setifera Lindl.
- Polystachya shega Kraenzl.
- Polystachya simplex Rendle
- Polystachya songaniensis G.Will.
- Polystachya sosefii Baranow & Mytnik
- Polystachya spatella Kraenzl.
- Polystachya stauroglossa Kraenzl.
- Polystachya stenophylla Schltr.
- Polystachya steudneri Rchb.f.
- Polystachya stewartiana Geerinck
- Polystachya stodolnyi Szlach. & Olszewski
- Polystachya stuhlmannii Kraenzl.
- Polystachya suaveolens P.J.Cribb
- Polystachya subdiphylla Summerh.
- Polystachya subulata Finet
- Polystachya subumbellata P.J.Cribb & Podz.
- Polystachya superposita Rchb.f.
- Polystachya supfiana Schltr.
- Polystachya teitensis P.J.Cribb
- Polystachya tenella Summerh.
- Polystachya tenuissima Kraenzl.
- Polystachya testuana Summerh.
- Polystachya thomensis Summerh.
- Polystachya transvaalensis Schltr.
- Polystachya tridentata Summerh.
- Polystachya troupiniana Geerinck
- Polystachya tsaratananae H.Perrier
- Polystachya tsinjoarivensis H.Perrier
- Polystachya uluguruensis P.J.Cribb & Podz.
- Polystachya undulata P.J.Cribb & Podz.
- Polystachya vaginata Summerh.
- Polystachya valentina la Croix & P.J.Cribb
- Polystachya victoriae Kraenzl.
- Polystachya villosa Rolfe
- Polystachya virescens Ridl.
- Polystachya virginea Summerh.
- Polystachya vulcanica Kraenzl.
- Polystachya walravensiana Geerinck & Arbonn.
- Polystachya waterlotii Guillaumin
- Polystachya wightii Rchb.f.
- Polystachya winigeri Eb.Fisch. & Killmann
- Polystachya woosnamii Rendle
- Polystachya xerophila Kraenzl.
- Polystachya zambesiaca Rolfe
- Polystachya zuluensis L.Bolus
