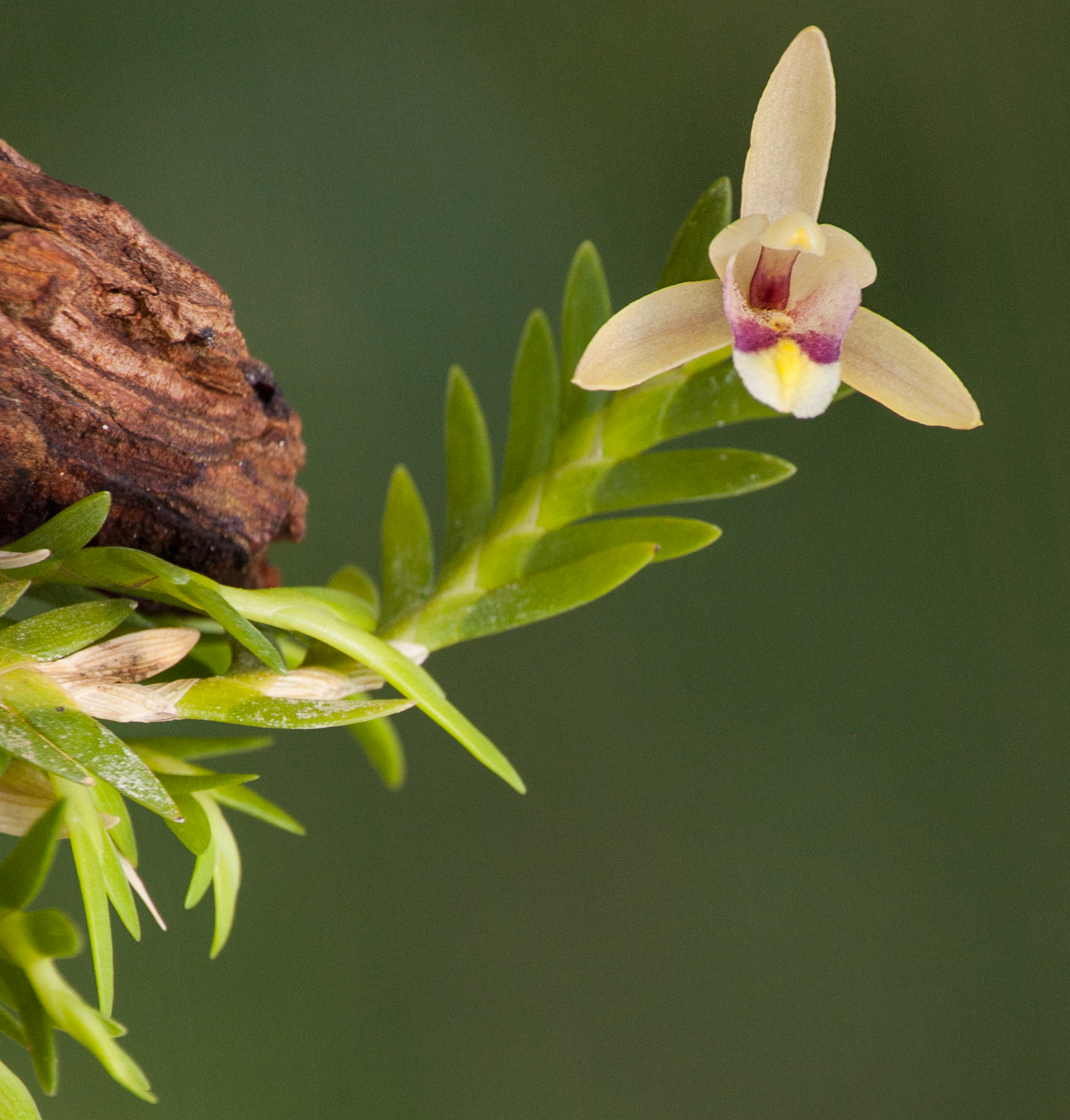
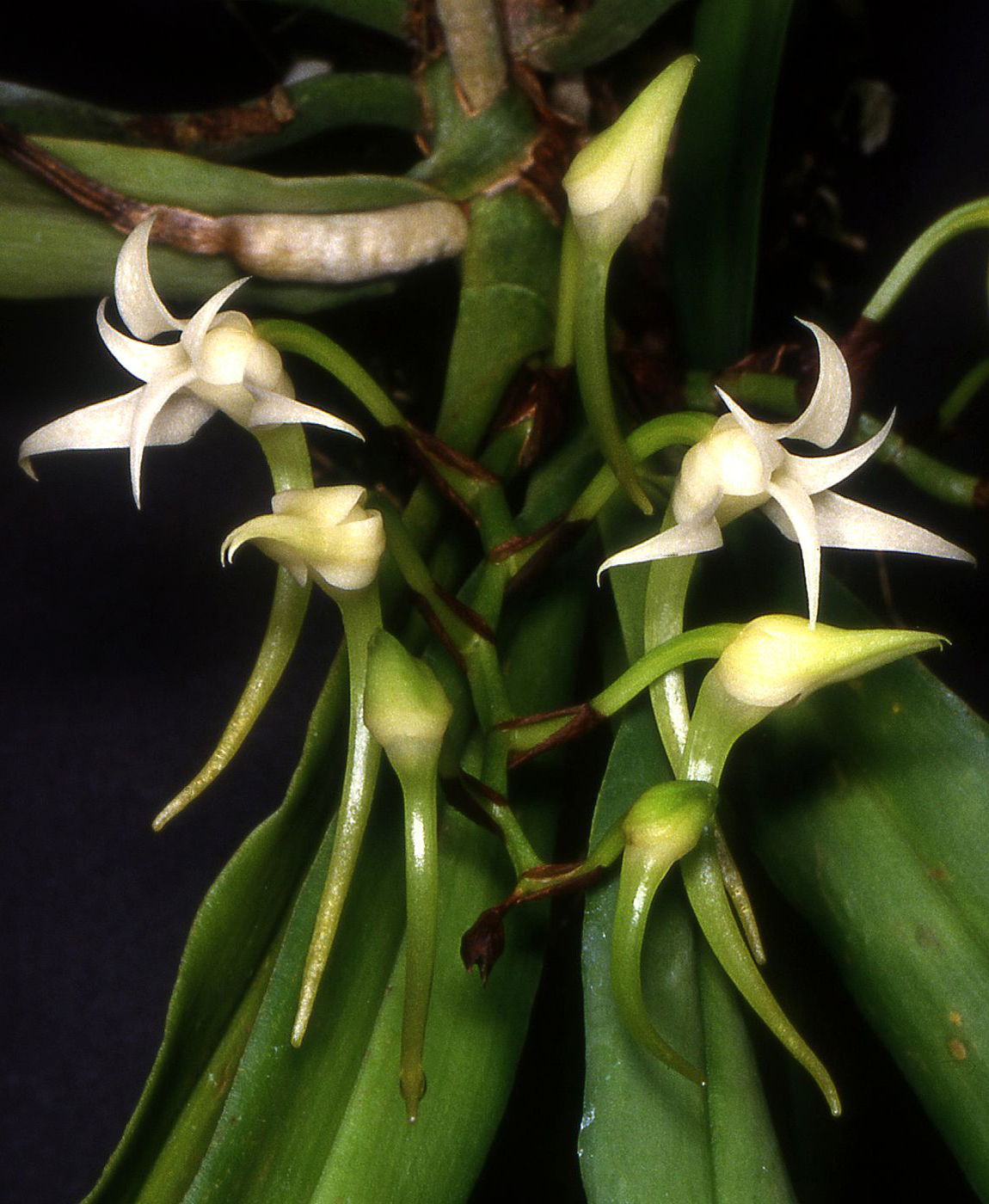
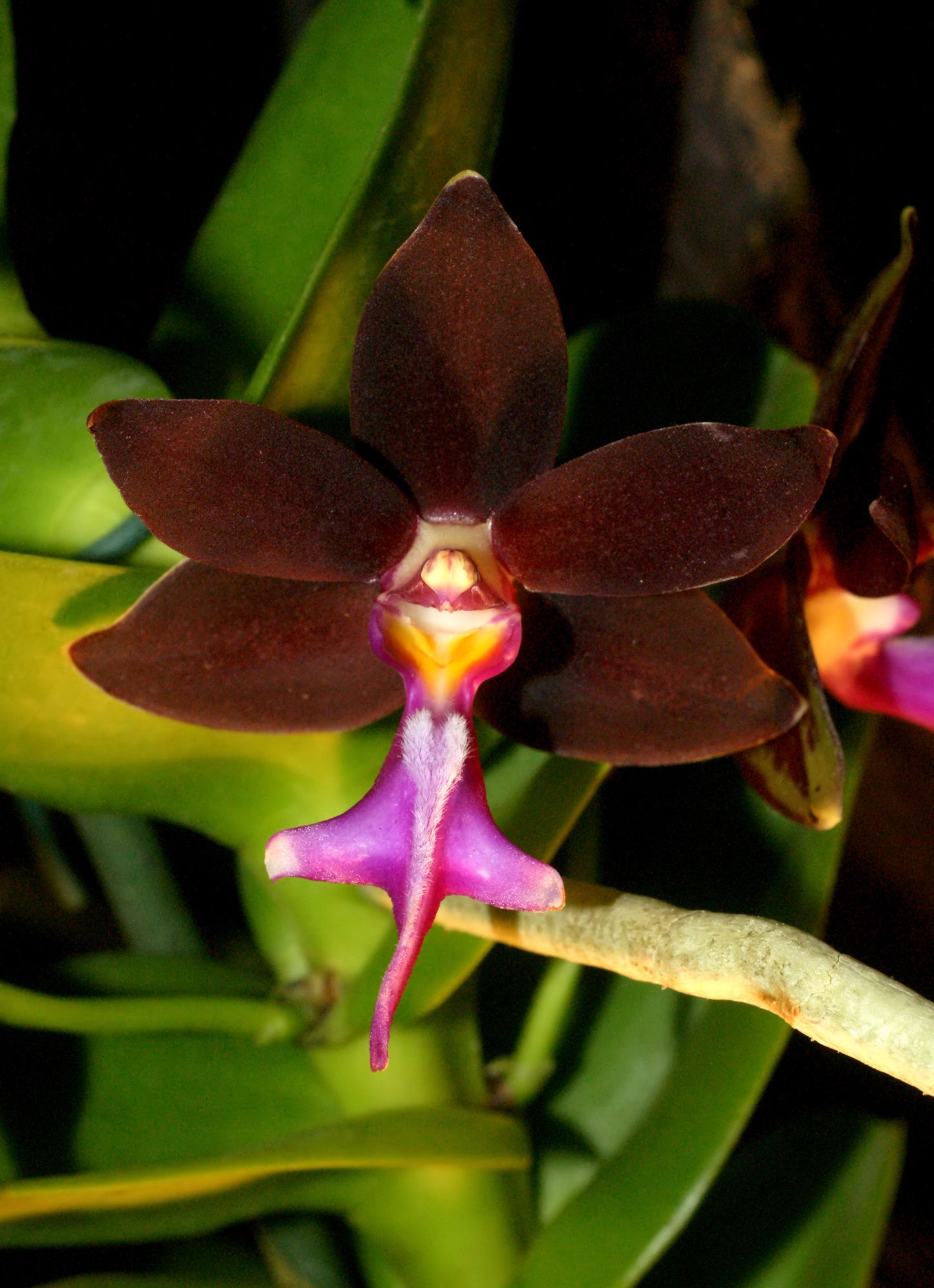
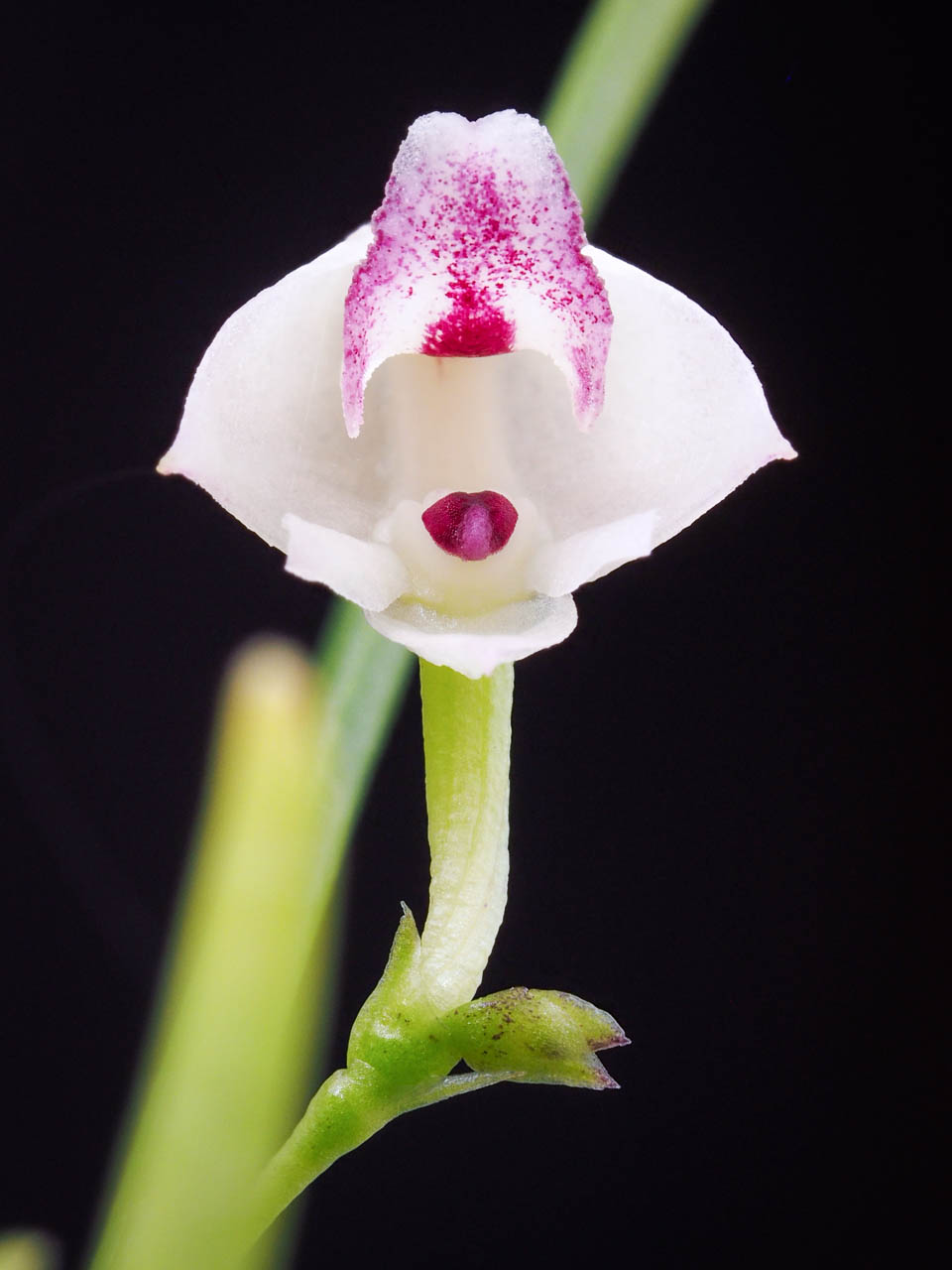
- Bromheadia brevifolia (Adrorhizinae) Cyrtorchis arcuata (Angraecinae) Trichoglottis atropurpurea (Aeridinae) Polystachya aconitiflora (Polystachyinae) Diversity of Vandeae

Scientific classification
- Kingdom: Plantae
- Clade: Tracheophytes
- Clade: Angiosperms
- Clade: Monocots
- Order: Asparagales
- Family: Orchidaceae
- Subfamily: Epidendroideae
- Tribe: Vandeae

Type genus
- Vanda R.Br.

Subtribes
- Adrorhizinae; Angraecinae; Aeridinae; Polystachyinae

Synonyms
- Polystachyeae Pfitzer (1887); Sarcantheae Pfitzer (1887); Polyrrhizeae Small (1933); Adrorhizeae (Schltr.) Szlach. (1995)

= Vandeae =

Vandeae Temporal range: 25.31 –0 Ma Late Oligocene – Recent

Tribe of orchids

The Vandeae is a large monophyletic tribe within the family of orchids.

== Scope ==
Aeranthes peyrotii

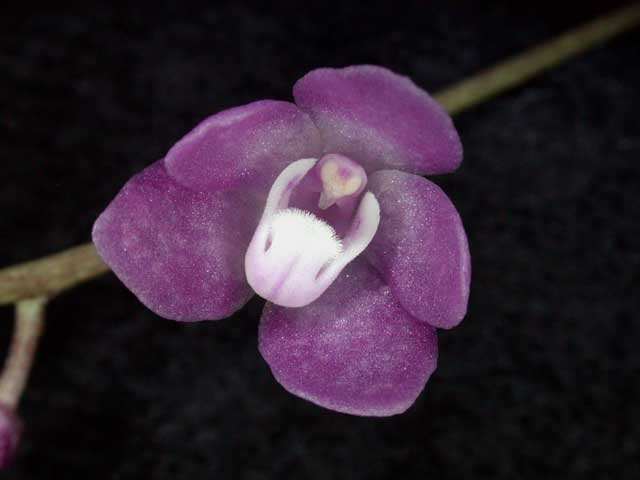
Sarcochilus ceciliae

This tribe contains 1,700 - 2,000 species in more than 150 genera.

== Epiphytic ==
These orchids are pantropical epiphytes and occur in tropical Asia, the Pacific Islands, Australia and Africa. Many of these orchids are horticulturally important, especially Vanda and Phalaenopsis.

== Subtribes ==
This tribe is subdivided into four subtribes:

- Subtribe Adrorhizinae
- Subtribe Aeridinae (formerly, illegitimate subtribal name Sarcanthinae): largest subtribe with more than 1,000 species in 103 genera, including about 200 hybrid species; occurs mostly in Asia and Australia and with a few in Africa. They are distinguished from the other subtribes by having an entire rostellum, a relatively small spur formed by the lip, and four (or two) pollinia.
- Subtribe Angraecinae Summerh.: about 400 species in 19 genera. They occur in tropical Africa, Madagascar, the Mascarene and Comoros Islands and two genera in tropical America. They are distinguished from the other subtribes by having an apron-like rostellum, an elongate spur, and two pollinia.
- Subtribe Polystachyinae (formerly part of the Epidendreae) : about 220 species in two genera : Hederorkis and Polystachya. They all show four pollinia. The lip often has mealy hairs called pseudopollen on the upper surface.

The following phylogenetic tree shows the relationships among the subtribes:

- Vandeae s.l.
  - - - Aeridinae
      - Angraecinae (including Aerangidinae)
    - Adrorhizinae
  - Polystachyinae

The subtribe Aerangidinae Summerh. is increasingly included within Angraecinae. The subtribe Angraecinae is a well supported, monophyletic group under the inclusion of Aerangidinae. Separating these groups would make them polyphyletic.

The divergence time of Vandeae has been estimated to be 25.31 Mya.

== Gallery ==
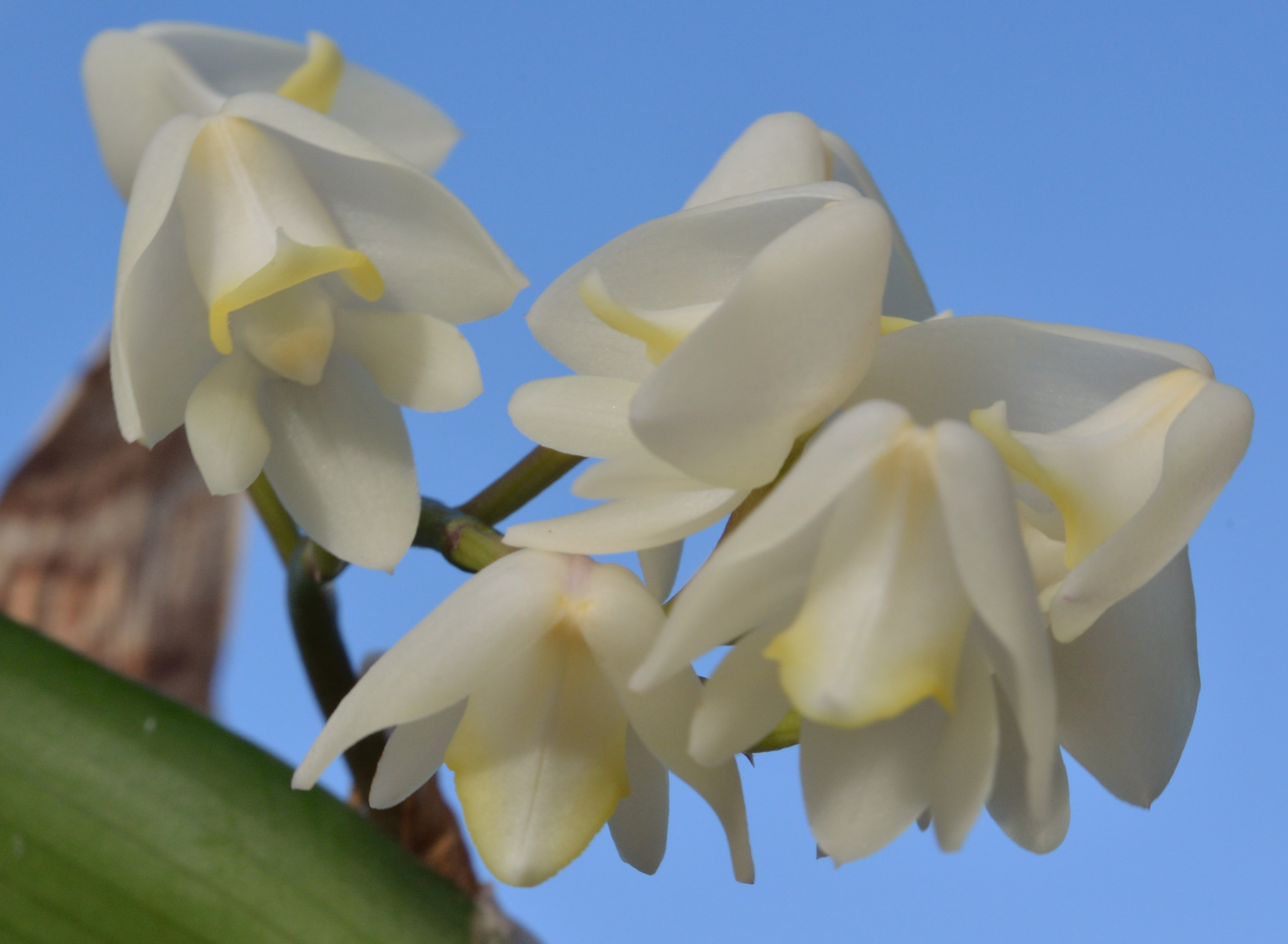
Polystachya virginea Summerh., a member of the subtribe Polystachyinae

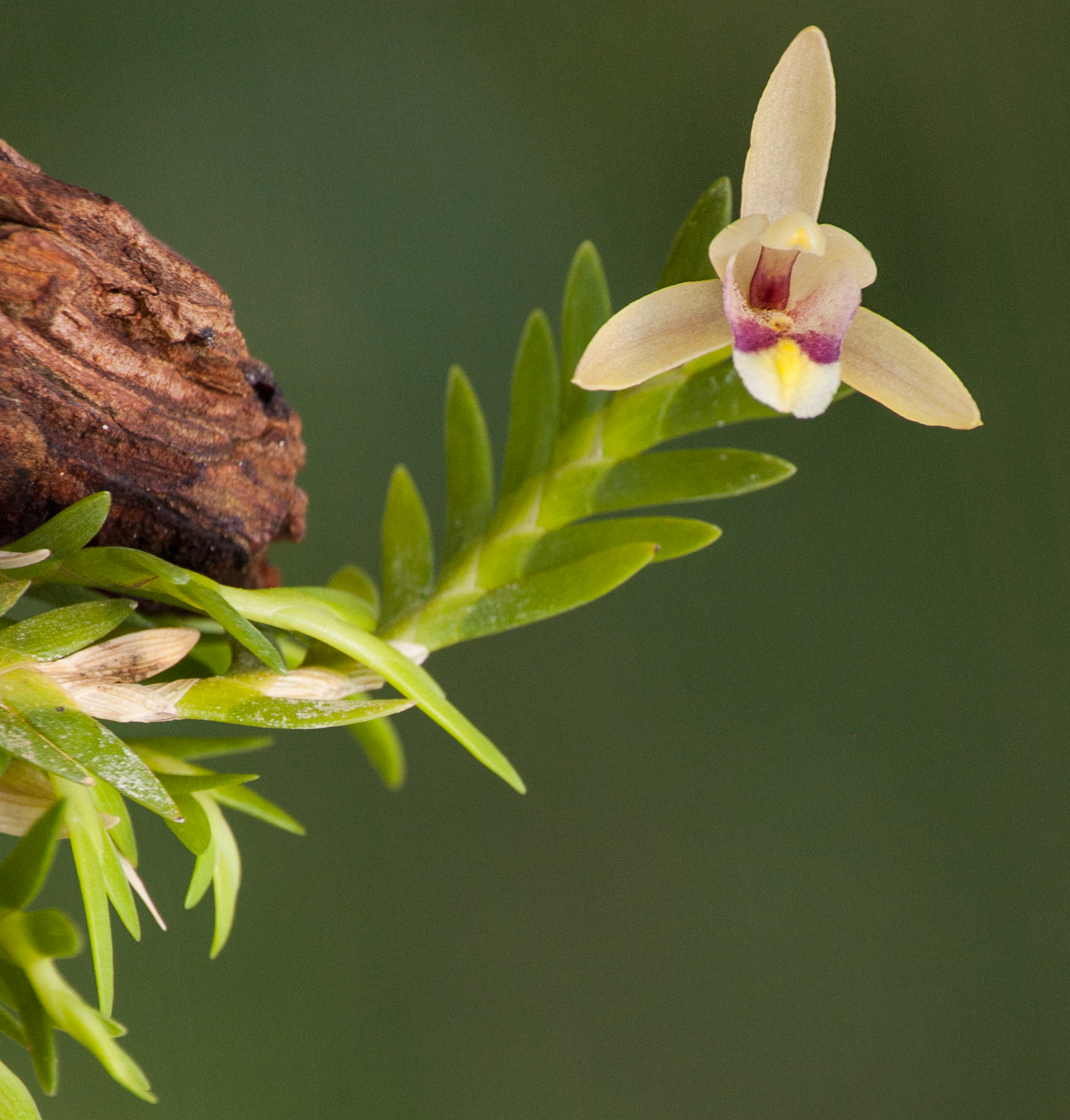
Bromheadia brevifolia Ridl., a member of the subtribe Adrorhizinae

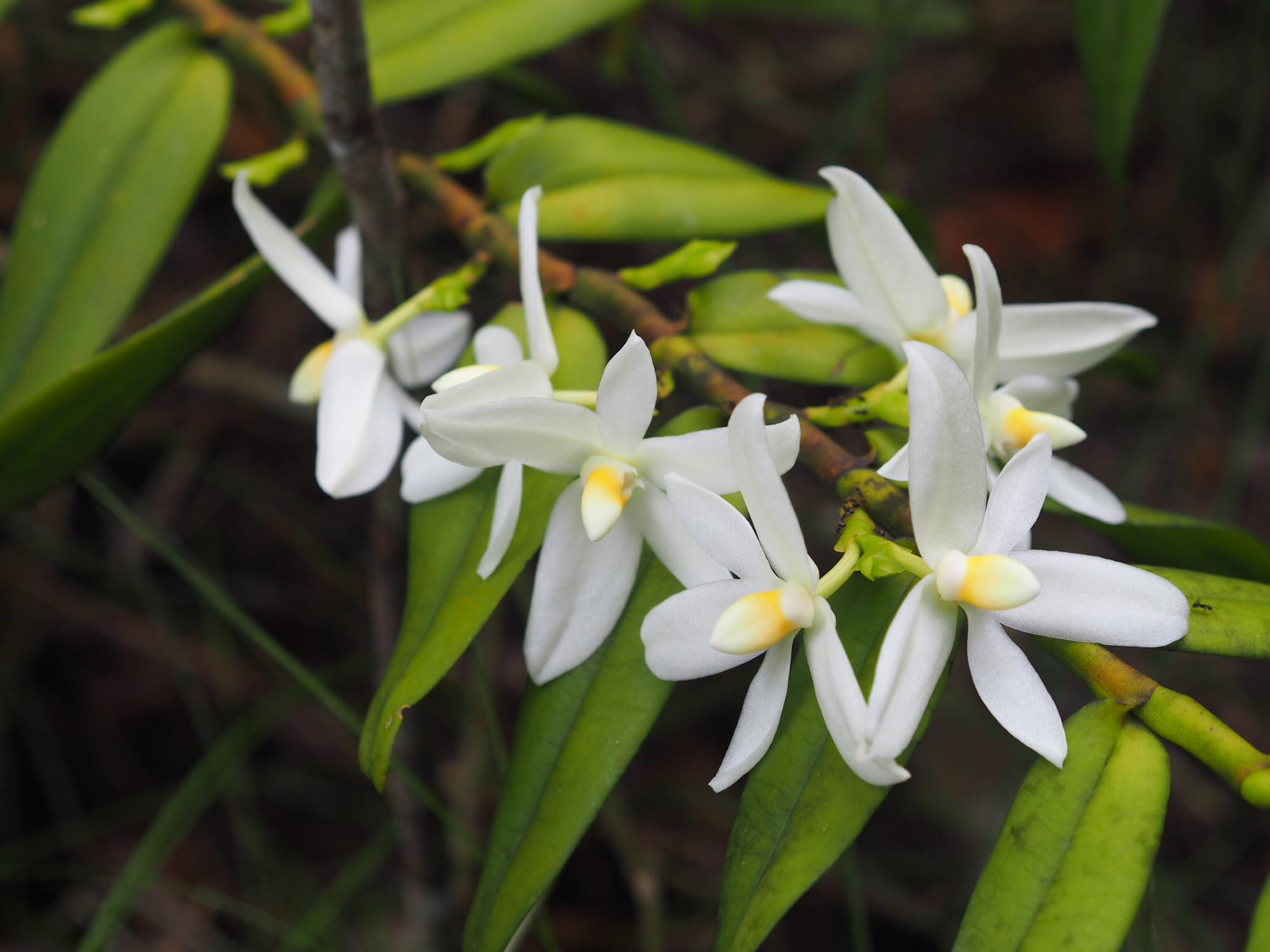
Thrixspermum calceolus (Lindl.) Rchb.f., a member of the subtribe Aeridinae

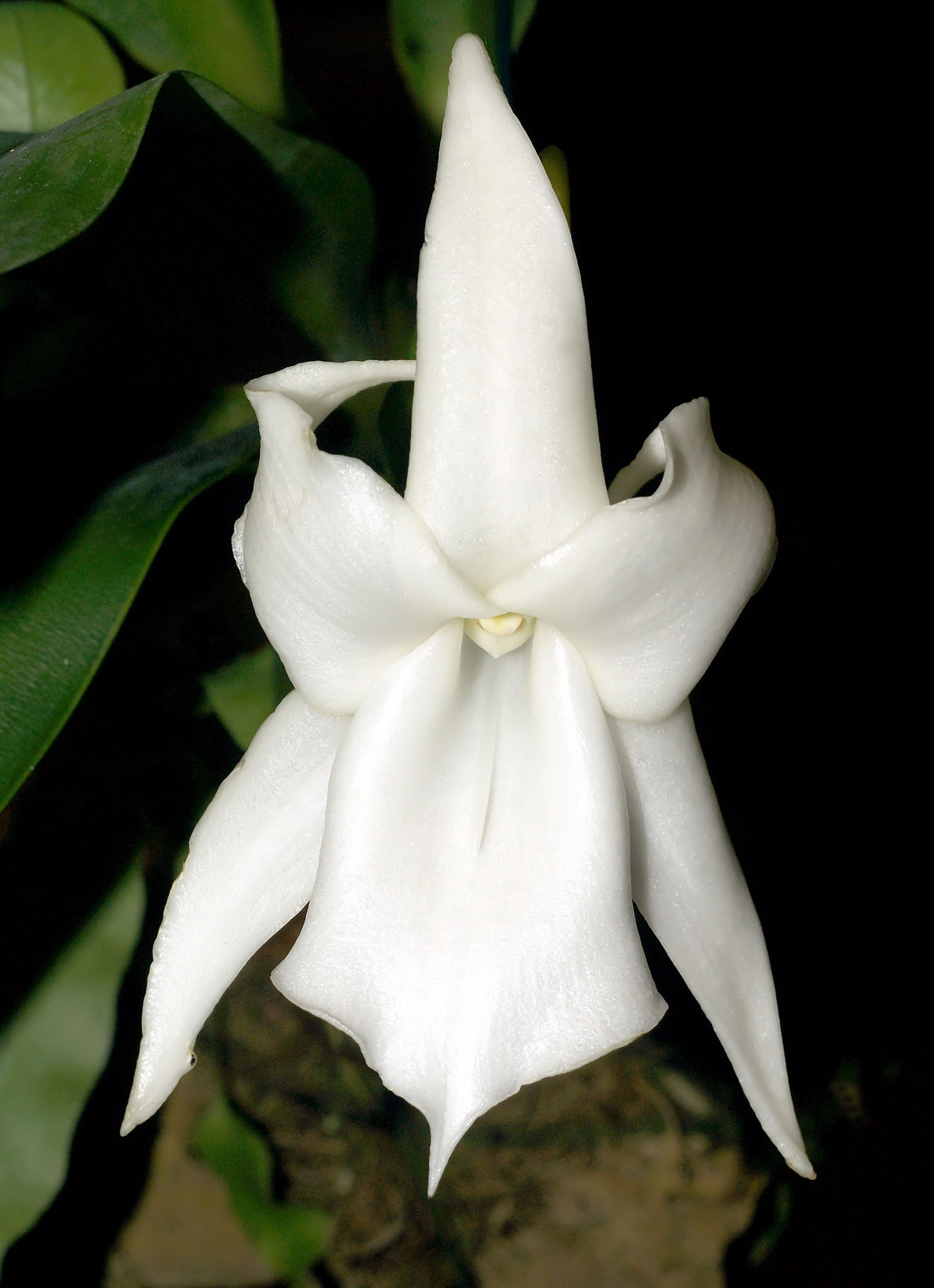
Angraecum magdalenae Schltr. & H.Perrier, a member of the subtribe Angraecinae

== See also ==
- Taxonomy of the Orchidaceae
