= List of Aerangis species =

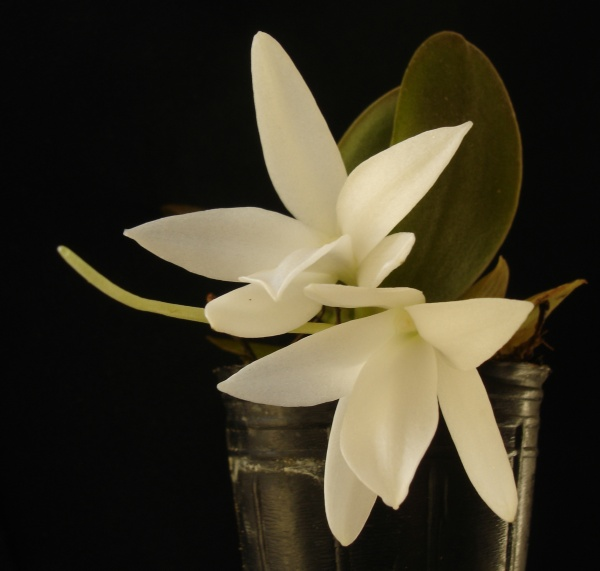
Aerangis fastuosa

Aerangis is a genus of orchids (Orchidaceae), containing approximately 57 species.

== A ==
- Aerangis alcicornis
- Aerangis appendiculata
- Aerangis arachnopus
- Aerangis articulata

== B ==
- Aerangis biloba
- Aerangis bovicornu
- Aerangis brachycarpa
- Aerangis bouarensis
- Aerangis boutonii

== C ==
- Aerangis calantha
- Aerangis carnea
- Aerangis x chirioana
- Aerangis citrata
- Aerangis collum-cygni
- Aerangis concavipetala
- Aerangis confusa
- Aerangis coriacea
- Aerangis coursiana
- Aerangis cryptodon

== D ==
- Aerangis decaryana
- Aerangis distincta
- Aerangis divitiflora

== E ==
- Aerangis ellisii

== F ==
- Aerangis fastuosa
- Aerangis flexuosa
- Aerangis fuscata

== G ==
- Aerangis gracillima
- Aerangis gravenreuthii

== H ==
- Aerangis hariotiana
- Aerangis hildebrandtii
- Aerangis hologlottis
- Aerangis humblotii
- Aerangis hyaloides

== J ==
- Aerangis jacksonii

== K ==
- Aerangis kirkii
- Aerangis kotschyana

== L ==
- Aerangis luteoalba
  - Aerangis luteoalba var. luteoalba
  - Aerangis luteoalba var. rhodosticta

== M ==
- Aerangis macrocentra
- Aerangis maireae
- Aerangis megaphylla
- Aerangis modesta
- Aerangis monantha
- Aerangis montana
- Aerangis mooreana
- Aerangis mystacidii

== O ==
- Aerangis oligantha

== P ==
- Aerangis pallidiflora
- Aerangis x primulina
- Aerangis pulchella
- Aerangis punctata

== R ==
- Aerangis rostellaris

== S ==
- Aerangis seegeri
- Aerangis somalensis
- Aerangis spiculata
- Aerangis splendida
- Aerangis stelligera
- Aerangis stylosa

== T ==
- Aerangis thomsonii

== U ==
- Aerangis ugandensis

== V ==
- Aerangis verdickii
  - Aerangis verdickii var. rusituensis
  - Aerangis verdickii var. verdickii
