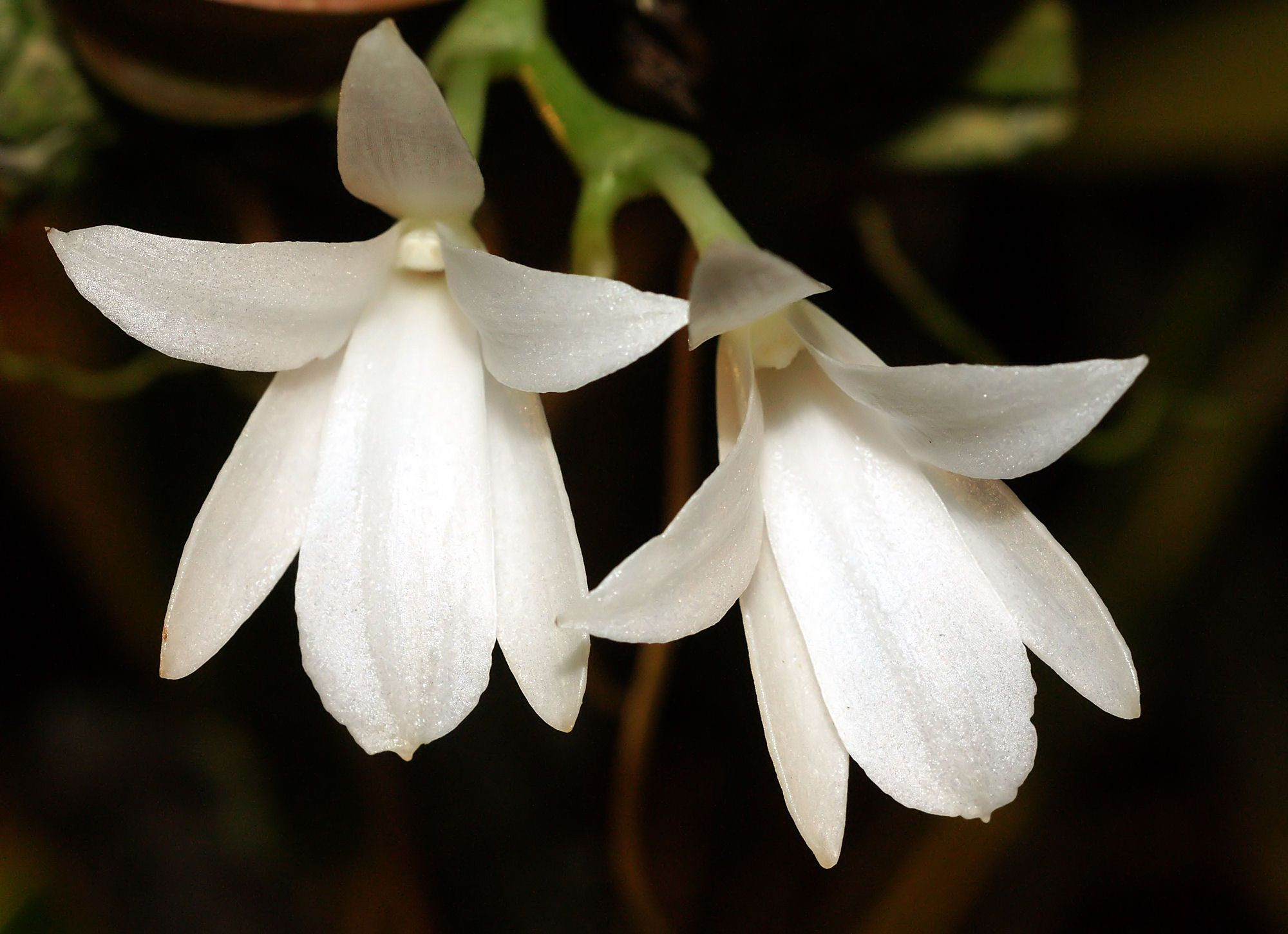

Conservation status
- Vulnerable (IUCN 3.1)

Scientific classification
- Kingdom: Plantae
- Clade: Tracheophytes
- Clade: Angiosperms
- Clade: Monocots
- Order: Asparagales
- Family: Orchidaceae
- Subfamily: Epidendroideae
- Genus: Aerangis
- Species: A. fastuosa

Binomial name
- Aerangis fastuosa (Rchb.f.) Schltr. (1914)

Synonyms
- Angraecum fastuosum Rchb.f. (1881) (Basionym); Angorchis fastuosa (Rchb.f.) Kuntze (1891); Rhaphidorhynchus fastuosus (Rchb.f.) Finet (1907)

= Aerangis fastuosa =

Species of orchid

Aerangis fastuosa, commonly known as the 'magnificent Aerangis', is a species of epiphytic orchid endemic to Madagascar. It is widespread across Madagascar, stretching from the eastern coastal forests across to the south and along the central plateau. Aerangis fastuosa belongs to the family Orchidaceae, subtribe Aerangidinae.

It was formally named by Rudolf Schlechter in 1914, but was first described by Heinrich Gustav Reichenbach in 1881, as Angraecum fastuosum. Henri Pierre de la Bâthie once attempted to have Aerangis fastuosum split into several varieties, but these were not accepted. Instead, Aerangis fastuosa is thought to have a highly variable morphology, and is known for its large, white, long-lasting, star-shaped, fragrant flowers. It has a very long rostellum, which is distinctive of its genus Aerangis. It can flower every year, even under low light, and is thought to be less prone to disease than other orchids, making it a highly sought out orchid species for cultivation.

Aerangis fastuosa has been listed under CITES Appendix II.

== Description ==
Areangis fastuosa is a highly variable in is morphology. It is a small plant, with its woody stem able to grow up to 60mm, but in some instances it can appear to be almost stemless. The roots are fine and numerous, and may have dark spots or banding.

Its leaves are thick and succulent, and are usually oblong. They are usually dark green but can have a grey to almost red tint, which is thought to be caused when an individual is growing in an environment with high light intensity. There are usually 4–6 leaves present on one plant. The top surface of the leaves can be wrinkled and rough, but this is not true amongst all individuals. Leaves are generally 75mm in length, but can range 15 - 80mm, and around 20 - 40mm in width. The surface of the leaf can also range from glossy to dull. Some individuals have also been found to have leaves with two lobes (bilobed), and a red spot on each lobe.

The pedicel is typically 20mm long and can be winged. The spur is thin and straight but can be coiled. The spur is usually twice the length of the pedicel but can be up to five times the length of the pedicel. The spur can have a brown colour to it and has also been sometimes found to have a green tip. The bracts are hooded and are usually around one quarter of the length of the pedicel, although some individuals have been found that have bracts one third or even half the length of the pedicel.

Flowers are relatively large compared to the small stature of Aerangis fastuosa. They can have between one and six flowers, spaced approximately 10mm apart. Sometimes individual flowers may have been aborted. Flowers are white in colour and are usually a star-like shape or trumpet-shaped. Often the flowers look slightly closed, with the petals and sepals sticking out but not spreading far. The peduncle is usually thick, being around 5mm in diameter.

Like all orchids, Aerangis fastuosa has an outer whorl composed of three sepals and an inner whorl composed of three petals, one of which has been modified into a lip. The dorsal sepal (upper sepal) is usually ovate (egg shaped) with the base being thicker than the tip, but width can be more equal across the length of the dorsal sepal. The dorsal sepal can range in size being 15 – 30mm x 5 – 8mm. The lateral sepals (bottom left and right sepals) can be a more lanceolate shape where the tip is much thinner than the base (spear shaped) and have a size range of around 17 – 34mm x 5 – 7mm.

The petals and sepals are rather similar in size and shape. At around 25mm in length, the petals are narrow and elongated, in an oblong shape. The lip can have a variable shape (usually ovate or lanceolate) but is usually wider than the petals, with the size ranging 15 – 25mm x 4.5 – 11mm.

The rostellum is distinctively elongated and can even reach and penetrate the spur. The length of the rostellum has been measured to range between 5 – 13mm. The column is short and generally thick. The anther can be doubly toothed at the top or can have a pointed horn which is either a thick or thin point. The ovaries are typically 15 – 25mm in length.

== Etymology ==
The species was first formally named by Rudolf Schlechter in 1914, after being transferred from the genus Angraecum to the genus Aerangis.

The name 'Aerangis' comes from the Greek 'Aer', meaning 'air', and 'angos', meaning 'urn', which is thought to refer to the shape of the nectar-producing spur at the base of the lip which is distinctive of the genus. The name 'fastuosa' means 'proud' or 'haughty' in Latin and is thought to refer to the small and attractive flowering habit of the species.

The common name for Aerangis fastuosa is the Magnificent Aerangis.

== Habitat and ecology ==
The plant is a slow growing, epiphyte of twigs and small branches. It can be found living in coastal forests and humid evergreen forests. They have also been reported living in sclerophyllous forests (where the vegetation is adapted to surviving hot, dry seasons), which seems unusual due to their need for a high humidity. The plant can tolerate low light levels but horticulturists have noted that they can also tolerate and seem to benefit from higher light levels. The plant does not generally tolerate cold climates and prefers warm intermediate conditions.

The flowers bloom every year in spring (September – February in the Southern Hemisphere, or March – April in the Northern Hemisphere), and can do so for many years. The flowers are fragrant at night, with the smell resembling tuberoses, and can persist on the plant for over 3 weeks.

Aerangis fastuosa belong to a group of orchids that are less prone to disease and pests than other orchids. If kept at the right conditions (i.e. sufficient air movement and a humid atmosphere) pests and disease can be kept at bay. If the plant finds itself to be too dry or have insufficient air movement it may be prone to red spider and fungal infections. The root tips are exposed and so may be more vulnerable to slugs and snails.

== Distribution ==
At least 21 Aerangis species are endemic to Madagascar, including Aerangis fastuosa with the other Aerangis species distributed in tropical Africa, Ceylon and the Comoros.

Aerangis fastuosa is widespread across the island and has been found between the east coastal plain and the central plateau (highlands). The provinces in which Aerangis fastuosa has been documented include Antananarivo, Fianarantsoa, Toamasina and Toliara.

Aerangis fastuosa has an altitudinal range of around 900m – 1500m, although other sources suggest its range is wider being around 100m – 1500m.

== Taxonomy and systematics ==
As an orchid, Aerangis fastuosa belongs in the family Orchidaceae. Aerangis fastuosa is one on the approximately 330 species that sit within the subtribe Aerangidinae, which is one of the three subtribes within the tribe Vandeae of the Epidendroideae subfamily. Aerangis is the type genus of the subtribe Aerangidinae and there are at least 58 Aerangis species. The genus Aerangis was proposed by H.G. Reichenbach in 1865 and is recognised by species having a straight, elongated rostellum and with most species having star-shaped flowers.

Many Aerangis species, including Aerangis fastuosa, were incorrectly placed within the Angraecum genus. Aerangis fastuosa was moved from Angraecum in 1914 by Schlechter.

Genetic studies have shown that Aerangis and Angraecum are separate genera as evidenced by the species within these genera have differing chromosome counts (Aerangis, n = 25; Angraecum, n = 19). This division of genera by chromosome count is supported by the differing morphologies, with Aerangis, and other n = 25 genera, having an elongated rostellum and Angraecum, and other n = 19 genera, having a shorter rostellum and a deeply divided column.

Although it is now known that Aerangidinae and the Angraecinae are separate subfamilies, historically they were considered together and so are sometimes referred to collectively as the 'angraecoids'.

The morphology of Aerangis fastuosa is highly variable, but it is not necessarily difficult to identify. It is characterised by its large flowers on a small plant with rounded leaves and the signature long rostellum.

=== Varieties ===
Perrier de la Bathie described six varieties of Aerangis fastuosa which have not been recognised:

- Aerangis fastuosa var. grandideri v.n.
- Aerangis fastuosa var. francoisii v.n.
- Aerangis fastuosa var. vondrozensis v.n.
- Aerangis fastuosa var. rotundifoloia v.n.
- Aerangis fastuosa var. angustifolia
- Aerangis fastuosa var. marculate

=== Synonyms ===
Aerangis fastuosa has three synonyms:

- Angraecum fastuosum Rchb.f. (1881) (basionym)
- Angorkis fastuosa (Rchb.f.) Kuntze (1891)
- Rhaphidorhynchus fastuosus (Rchb.f.) Finet (1907)

The type specimen for Aerangis fastuosa var. grandideri was also the type specimen for Rhaphidorhynchus fastuosus.

== Cultivation ==
Aerangis fastuosa is a well-known, highly sought after Madagascan white-flowered orchid, and are available for sale. It grows well in pots or can be mounted. If mounted it is necessary to spray with water daily, otherwise they will often decline quickly. Warm intermediate conditions are preferred (15.5 – 18 °C), and they are suitable for growing on windowsills.

== Hybrids ==
Aerangis species are known for being particularly resistant to intensive hybridisation and so many do not last in cultivation. Many are only offspring of the initial cross as further crossing is not successful, although there are some exceptions (see: Aerangis Zipper and Aerangis Winter Snow).

=== List of registered hybrids ===
There are 9 registered orchid hybrids which involve Aerangis fastuosa:

- Aerangis Snow Nymph – Aerangis fastuosa x Amesiella phillippinensis
- Aerangis Fastyl - Aerangis fastuosa x Aerangis stylosa
- Aerangis Fastyana - Aerangis fastuosa x Aerangis kotschyana
- Aerangis Fastosticta - Aerangis luteoalba x Aerangis fastuosa
- Aerangis Fast Joint - Aerangis fastuosa x Aerangis articulate
- Aerangis Verdicosa - Aerangis verdickii x Aerangis fastuosa
- Aerangis James G. Coyner - Aerangis citrate x Aerangis fastuosa
- Aerangis Zipper - Aerangis James G. Coyner x Aerangis citrate
- Aerangis Winter Snow - Aerangis Winter Dove x Aerangis fastuosa

== Additional information ==
Aerangis fastuosa is classified as CITES Appendix II.

Aerangis fastuosa has been identified as being a potential natural source of Lavandulol, which can be used as an attracting agent involved in acarid pest control.
