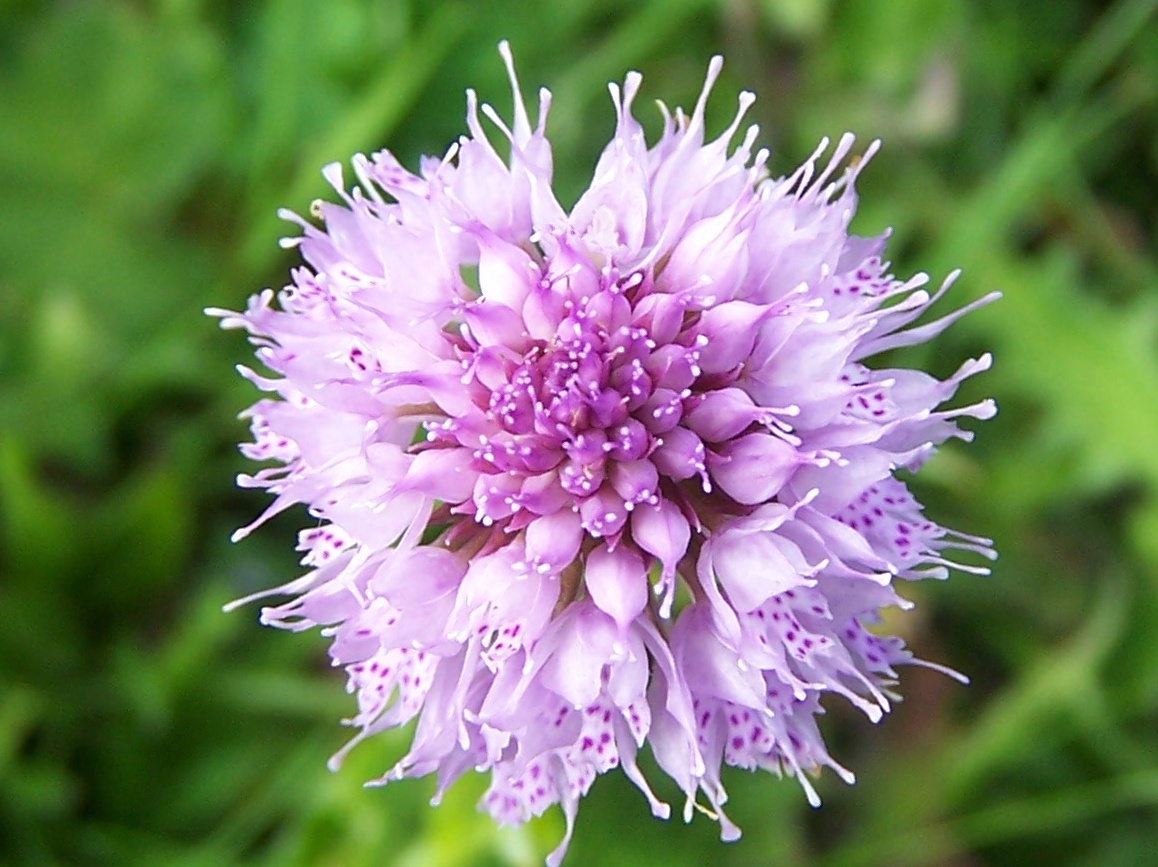
- Traunsteinera globosa

Scientific classification
- Kingdom: Plantae
- Clade: Embryophytes
- Clade: Tracheophytes
- Clade: Spermatophytes
- Clade: Angiosperms
- Clade: Monocots
- Order: Asparagales
- Family: Orchidaceae
- Subfamily: Orchidoideae
- Tribe: Orchideae
- Subtribe: Orchidinae
- Genus: Traunsteinera; Rchb.

Type species
- Traunsteinera globosa

Synonyms
- Orchites Schur

= Traunsteinera =

Genus of flowering plants

Traunsteinera, the round headed orchid, or globe orchid, is a genus of flowering plants from the orchid family, Orchidaceae.

== Description ==
Traunsteinera species are terrestrial, perennial plants (geophytes), which overwinter with two ovate root nodules.

They are slender, up to 60 cm high plants. The flower stem has no leaf rosette but scattered stem leaves.

The inflorescence is very dense, with dozens of small flowers in an initially cone-shaped, later spherical, spike. The perianth petals are oval in shape, with a long spatulate spire, forming a helmet. The lip is three-lobed, with a thin, curved spur. The gynostemium is short and obtuse, the rostellum three-lobed.

== Distribution ==
The species are rare and occur locally in the medium and high mountain ranges from the temperate regions of Europe to the Caucasus. Plants are found growing in neutral to calcareous, moist or dry soils in sunny places such as calcareous grasslands and alpine meadows in medium and high mountain ranges from 1000-3000 m.

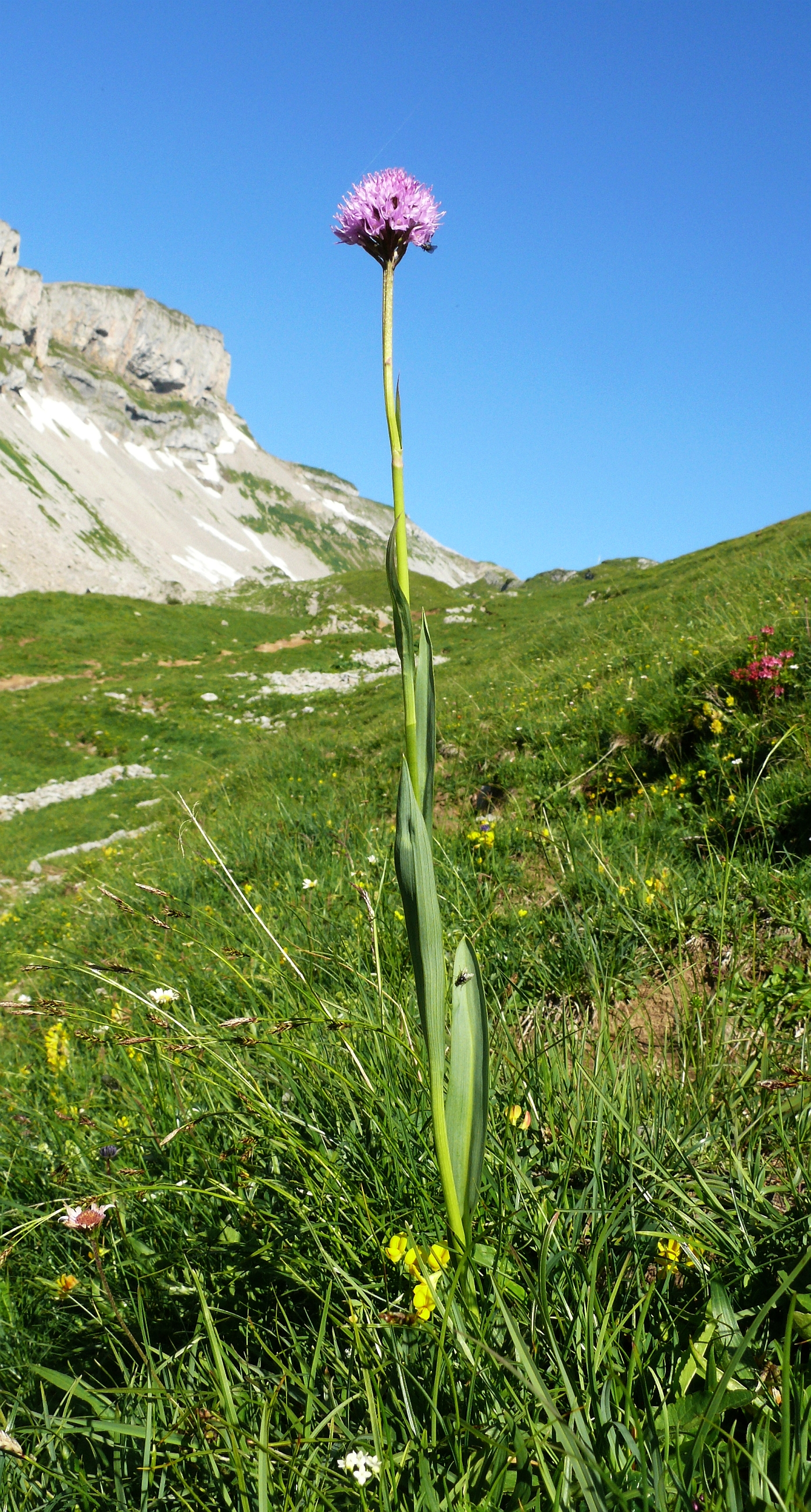
Traunsteinera globosa growing in habitat in Austria

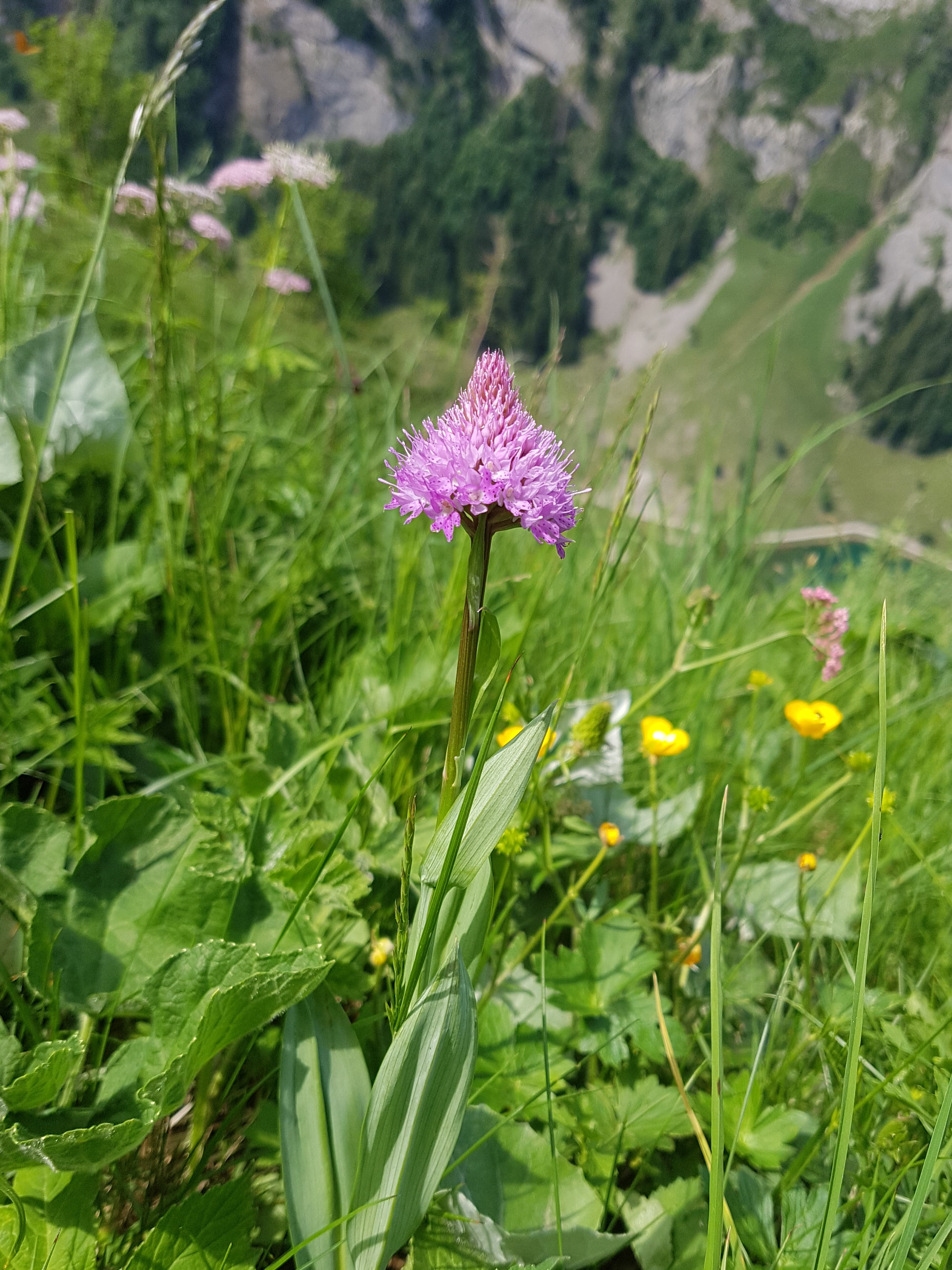
Traunsteinera globosa near Meglisalp, Alpstein mountain range, Switzerland

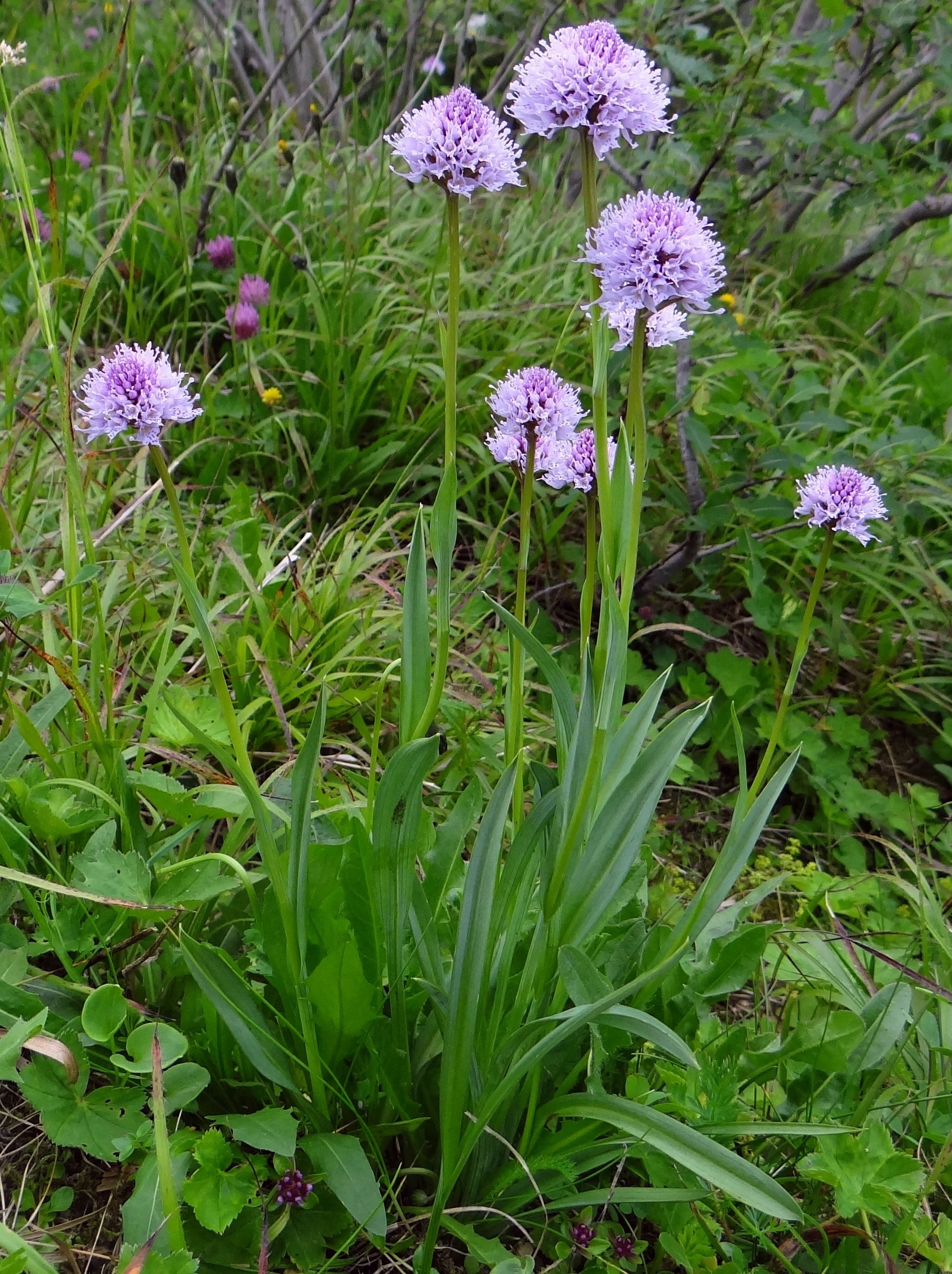
Traunsteinera globosa growing in the West Tatra Mountains

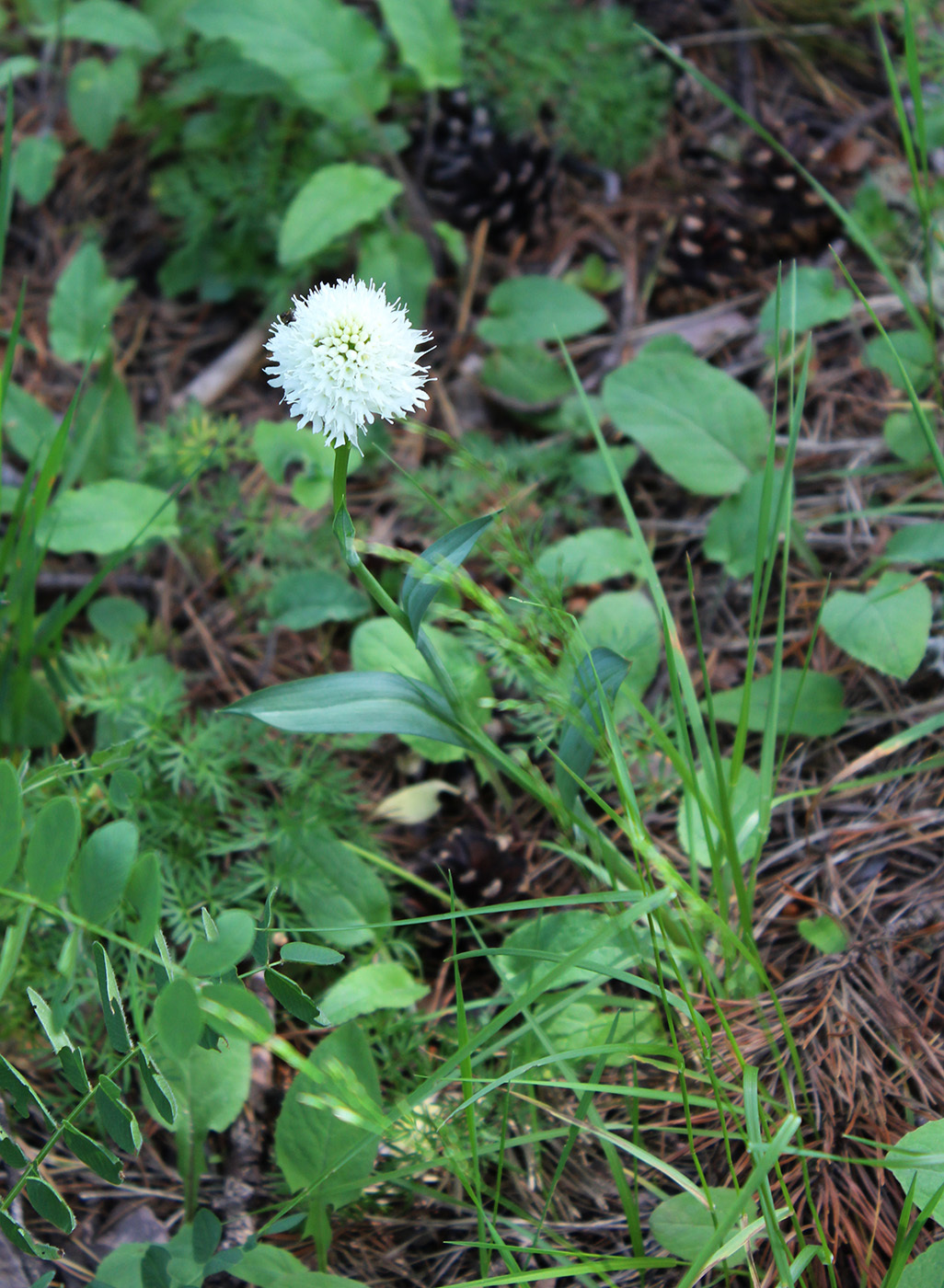
Traunsteinera sphaerica growing in Karachayevsky District, Karachay-Cherkessia, Russia

== Taxonomy ==
Traunsteinera is named after the Austrian pharmacist and botanist Joseph Traunsteiner (1798–1850). The scientific name was published in 1842 by Heinrich Gottlieb Ludwig Reichenbach.

=== Species ===
There are two known species, native to Europe, Turkey and the Caucasus.

Image	Name	Distribution	Elevation (m)
	Traunsteinera globosa (L.) Rchb. 1842	widespread from Spain east to Ukraine and Turkey, including France, Germany, Italy, Poland, Romania, etc.	1,000–2,700 metres (3,300–8,900 ft)
	Traunsteinera sphaerica (M.Bieb.) Schltr. 1928	Turkey and the Caucasus	1,000–3,000 metres (3,300–9,800 ft)

== See also ==
- List of Orchidaceae genera
