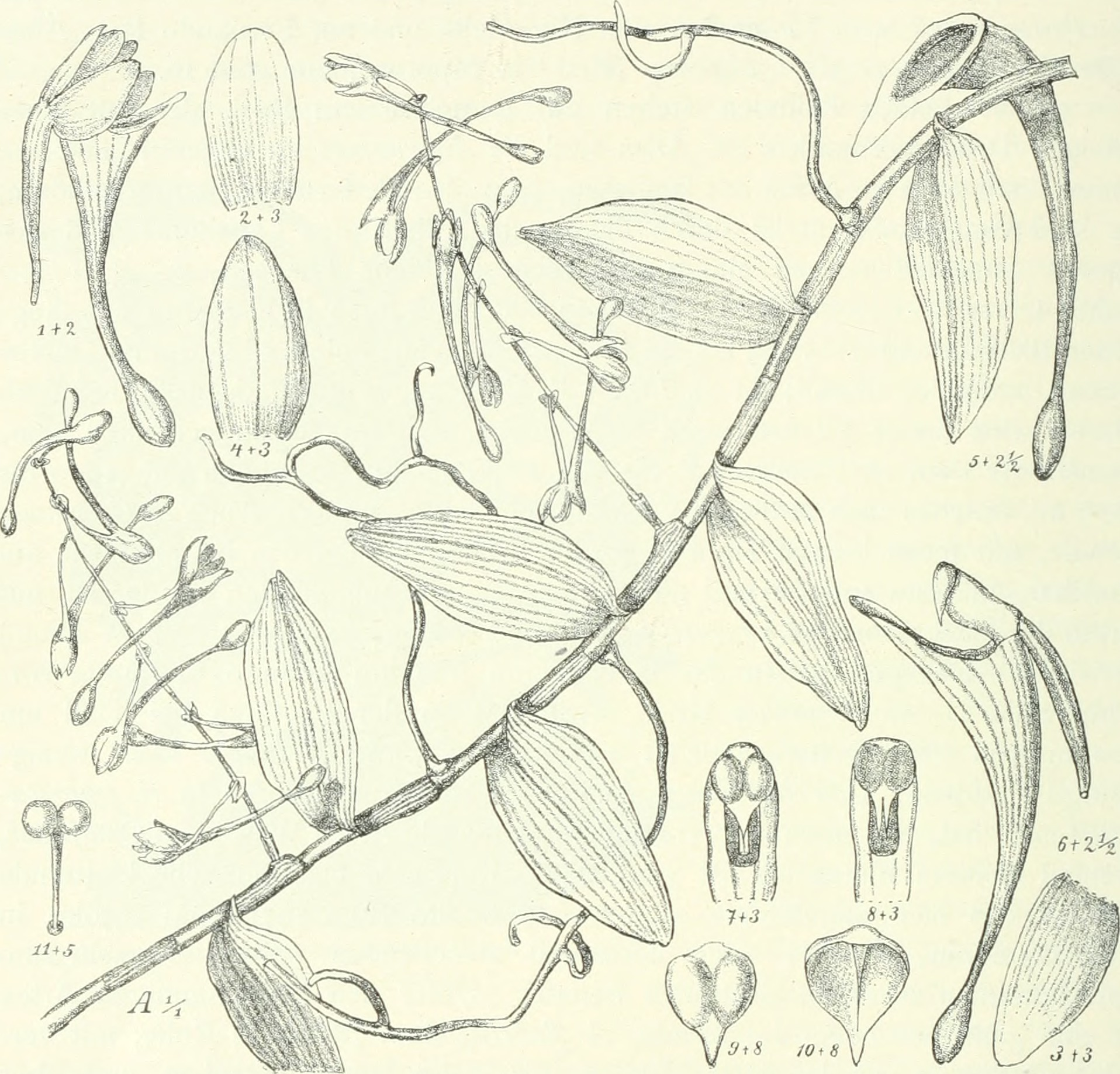
- Botanical illustration of Solenangis scandens

Scientific classification
- Kingdom: Plantae
- Clade: Tracheophytes
- Clade: Angiosperms
- Clade: Monocots
- Order: Asparagales
- Family: Orchidaceae
- Subfamily: Epidendroideae
- Tribe: Vandeae
- Subtribe: Angraecinae
- Genus: Solenangis; Schltr.

Synonyms
- Celatorchis (R.Rice) R.Rice; Gussonia Spreng.; Neocribbia Szlach.

= Solenangis =

Genus of orchids

Solenangis is a genus of flowering plants from the orchid family, Orchidaceae. It is native to sub-Saharan Africa.

== Ecology ==
Solenangis conica grows on the preferred phorophyte species Podocarpus latifolius in humid forests at altitudes of 1600-1900 m above sea level among lichens and moss.

== Taxonomy ==
=== Species ===
Solenangis has five species:

- Solenangis clavata (Rolfe) Schltr. - from Liberia east to Rwanda
- Solenangis conica (Schltr.) L.Jonss. - Equatorial Guinea, Kenya, Tanzania, Malawi, Mozambique, Zimbabwe
- Solenangis scandens (Schltr.) Schltr - from Sierra Leone east to Zaire
- Solenangis wakefieldii (Rolfe) P.J.Cribb & J.Stewart - Somalia, Kenya, Tanzania
- Solenangis impraedicta - Madagascar

=== Species formerly placed in Solenangis ===
Seven former species have been transferred to the genus Microcoelia:

- Solenangis africana R.Rice from Kenya is now a synonym of Microcoelia africana (R.Rice) R.Rice
- Solenangis aphylla (Thouars) Summerh. is now a synonym of Microcoelia aphylla (Thouars) Summerh.
- Solenangis cornuta (Ridl.) Summerh. is now a synonym of Microcoelia cornuta (Ridl.) Carlsward
- Solenangis cyclochila (Schltr.) R.Rice is now a synonym of Microcoelia cornuta (Ridl.) Carlsward
- Solenangis defoliata (Schltr.) R.Rice is now a synonym of Microcoelia aphylla (Thouars) Summerh.
- Solenangis grahamii R.Rice from Kenya is now a synonym of Microcoelia grahamii (R.Rice) R.Rice
- Solenangis longipes R.Rice from Tanzania is now a synonym of Microcoelia longipes (R.Rice) R.Rice

Further species have been transferred to Dinklageella:

- Solenangis liberica (Mansf.) R.Rice is now a synonym of Dinklageella liberica Mansf.
- Solenangis minor (Summerh.) R.Rice is now a synonym of Dinklageella minor Summerh.
- Solenangis saotomensis R.Rice is now a synonym of Dinklageella scandens Stévart & P.J.Cribb
- Solenangis liberica var. villiersii (Szlach. & Olszewski) R.Rice is now a synonym of Dinklageella villiersii Szlach. & Olszewski

And one species has been transferred to Rangaeris:

- Solenangis trilobata (Summerh.) R.Rice is now a synonym of Rangaeris trilobata Summerh.

== See also ==
- List of Orchidaceae genera
