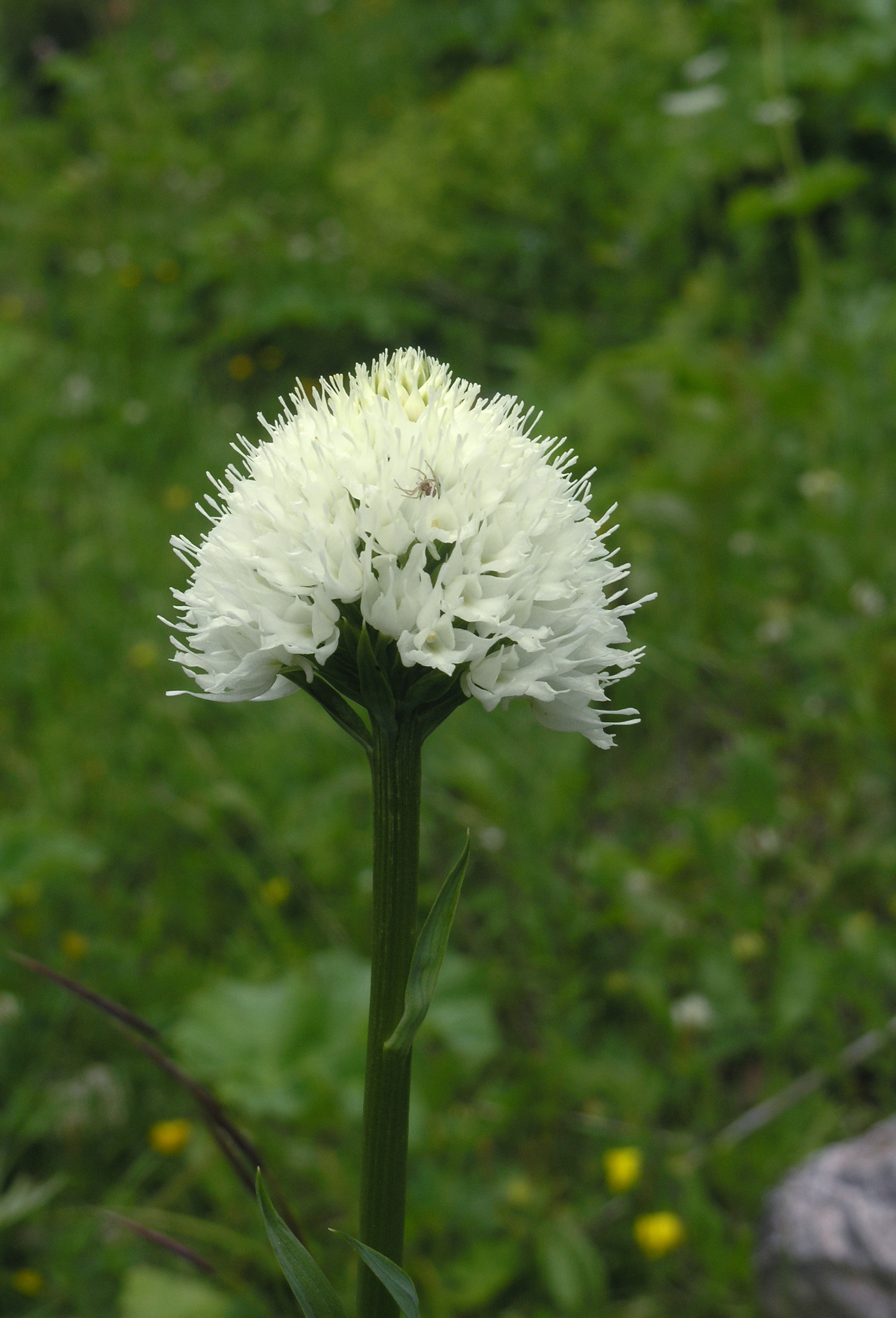
- Traunsteinera sphaerica in Russia

Scientific classification
- Kingdom: Plantae
- Clade: Embryophytes
- Clade: Tracheophytes
- Clade: Angiosperms
- Clade: Monocots
- Order: Asparagales
- Family: Orchidaceae
- Subfamily: Orchidoideae
- Genus: Traunsteinera
- Species: T. sphaerica

Binomial name
- Traunsteinera sphaerica (M.Bieb.) Schltr.

Synonyms
- Orchis sphaerica M.Bieb; Traunsteinera globosa subsp. sphaercia (M.Bieb) Soó; Traunsteinera globosa var. sphaerica (M.Bieb.) E.G.Camus

= Traunsteinera sphaerica =

Species of orchid

Traunsteinera sphaerica is a species of flowering plant in the orchid family, Orchidaceae. It is found in montane meadows and open woodlands above around 1500 m in the Caucasus, Crimea, and parts of northeastern Turkey.

== Description ==
Traunsteinera sphaerica is similar to T. globosa, but differs in having larger, white, unspotted flowers with labella with a more slender central lobe.
