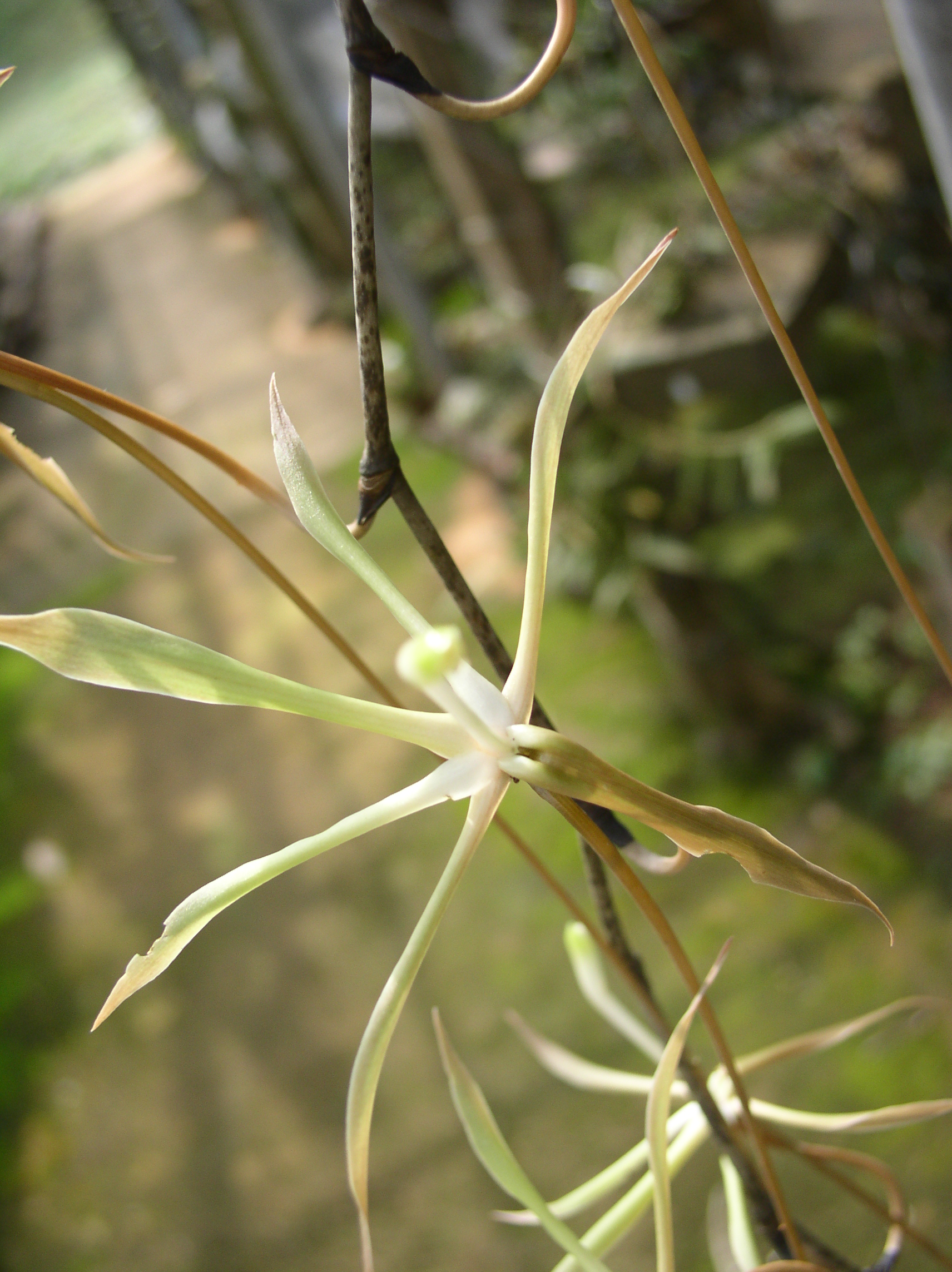

Conservation status
- Least Concern (IUCN 3.1)

Scientific classification
- Kingdom: Plantae
- Clade: Tracheophytes
- Clade: Angiosperms
- Clade: Monocots
- Order: Asparagales
- Family: Orchidaceae
- Subfamily: Epidendroideae
- Genus: Aerangis
- Species: A. gracillima

Binomial name
- Aerangis gracillima (Kraenzl.) Schlechter

= Aerangis gracillima =

Species of orchid

Aerangis gracillima is a species of plant in the family Orchidaceae. It is found in Cameroon and Gabon. Its natural habitat is subtropical or tropical dry forests.

It was previously placed alone in genus Barombia.

== Sources ==
- Cheek, M.; Cable, S. (2000). "Barombia gracillima". IUCN Red List of Threatened Species. 2000 e.T39568A10241914. doi:10.2305/IUCN.UK.2000.RLTS.T39568A10241914.en.
