= Aerangis flexuosa =

Scientific classification
- Kingdom: Plantae
- Clade: Tracheophytes
- Clade: Angiosperms
- Clade: Monocots
- Order: Asparagales
- Family: Orchidaceae
- Subfamily: Epidendroideae
- Genus: Aerangis
- Species: A. flexuosa

Binomial name
- Aerangis flexuosa (Ridl.) Schltr. 1918

Synonyms
- Radinocion flexuosum Ridl. Angraecum flexuosum (Ridl.) Rolfe Angraecum elegans Roffey; Aerangis elegans (Roffey) Dandy

Species of orchid

Aerangis flexuosa is a species of epiphytic orchid endemic to the island of São Tomé.
