= Aerangis ellisii =

Conservation status
- Vulnerable (IUCN 3.1)
- CITES Appendix I

Scientific classification
- Kingdom: Plantae
- Clade: Embryophytes
- Clade: Tracheophytes
- Clade: Angiosperms
- Clade: Monocots
- Order: Asparagales
- Family: Orchidaceae
- Subfamily: Epidendroideae
- Genus: Aerangis
- Species: A. ellisii

Binomial name
- Aerangis ellisii (B.S. Williams) Schltr. (1914)

Species of orchid

Aerangis ellisii is a species of epiphytic orchid. It is native to Madagascar .
