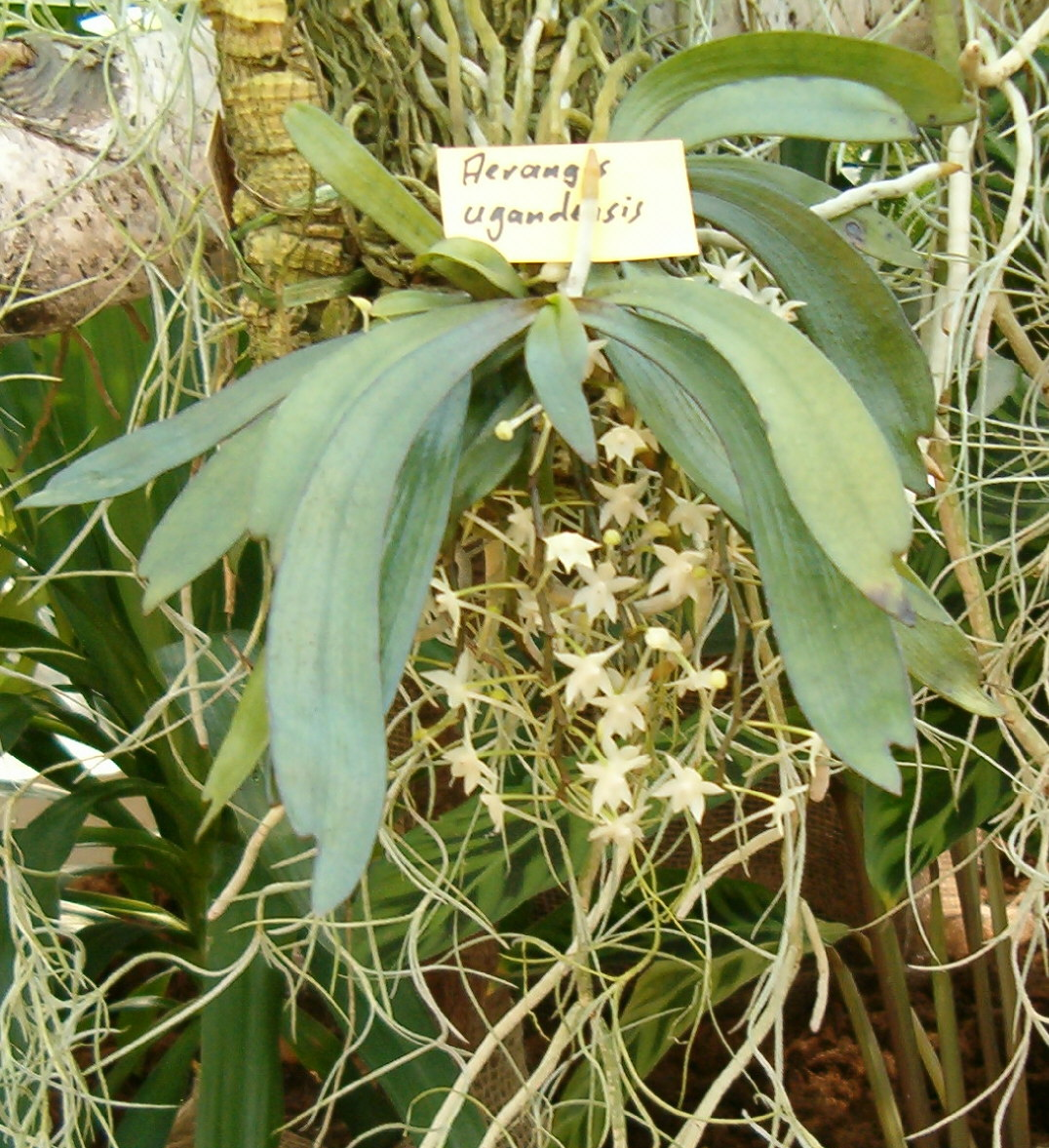

Scientific classification
- Kingdom: Plantae
- Clade: Tracheophytes
- Clade: Angiosperms
- Clade: Monocots
- Order: Asparagales
- Family: Orchidaceae
- Subfamily: Epidendroideae
- Genus: Aerangis
- Species: A. ugandensis

Binomial name
- Aerangis ugandensis Summerh. (1931)

= Aerangis ugandensis =

Species of plant

Aerangis ugandensis is a species of epiphytic orchid native to Uganda, Kenya, Rwanda, Burundi, and Congo-Kinshasa (Zaire, Democratic Republic of the Congo).
