= Diaphananthe eggelingii =

Conservation status
- Least Concern (IUCN 3.1)

Scientific classification
- Kingdom: Plantae
- Clade: Tracheophytes
- Clade: Angiosperms
- Clade: Monocots
- Order: Asparagales
- Family: Orchidaceae
- Subfamily: Epidendroideae
- Genus: Diaphananthe
- Species: D. eggelingii

Binomial name
- Diaphananthe eggelingii P.J.Cribb

Species of orchid

Diaphananthe eggelingii is a species of epiphytic subshrub native to southwest Uganda.
