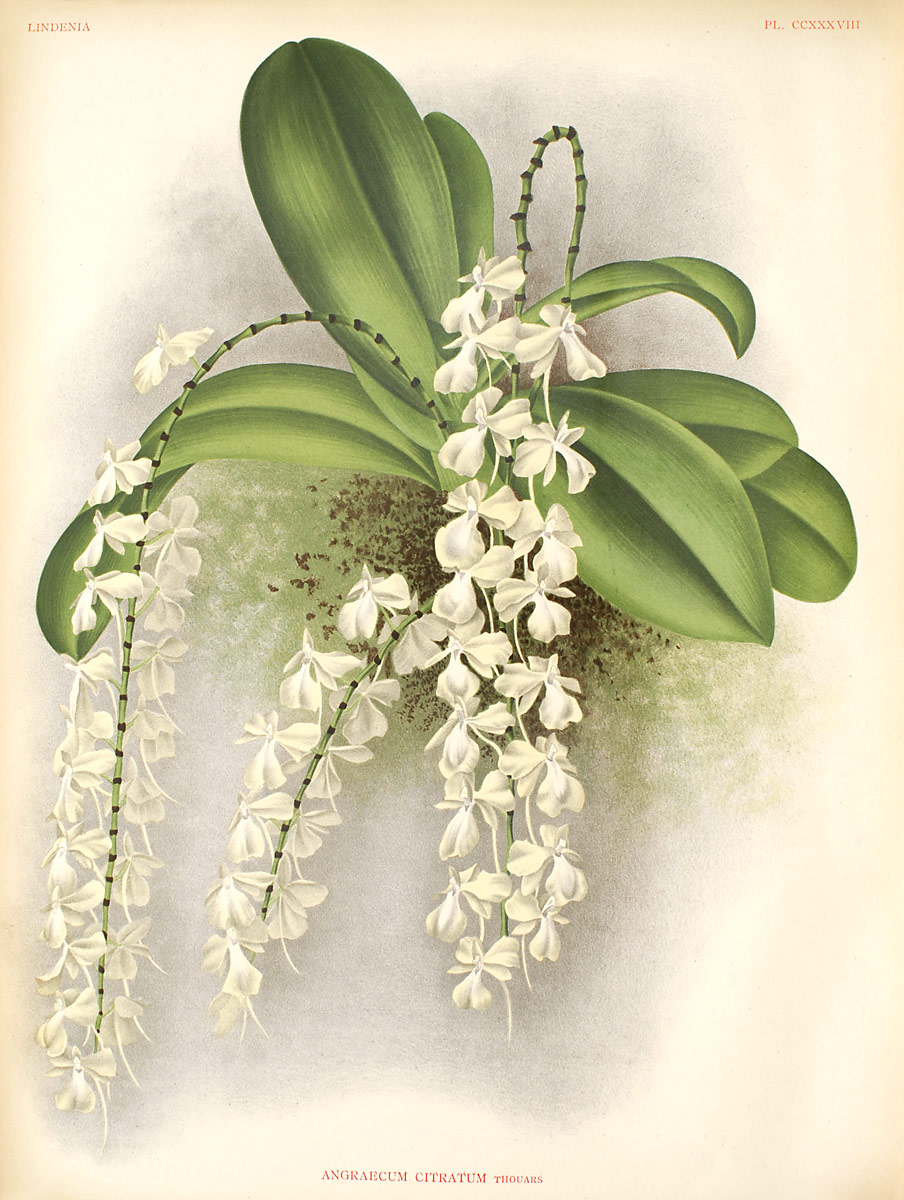

Conservation status
- Least Concern (IUCN 3.1)

Scientific classification
- Kingdom: Plantae
- Clade: Tracheophytes
- Clade: Angiosperms
- Clade: Monocots
- Order: Asparagales
- Family: Orchidaceae
- Subfamily: Epidendroideae
- Genus: Aerangis
- Species: A. citrata

Binomial name
- Aerangis citrata (Thouars) Schltr. (1914)

Synonyms
- Angraecum citratum Thouars (1822) (Basionym); Aerobion citratum (Thouars) Spreng. (1826); Angorchis citrata (Thouars) Kuntze (1891); Rhaphidorhynchus citratus (Thouars) Finet (1907)

= Aerangis citrata =

Species of orchid

Aerangis citrata is an epiphytic species of orchid endemic to Madagascar.
