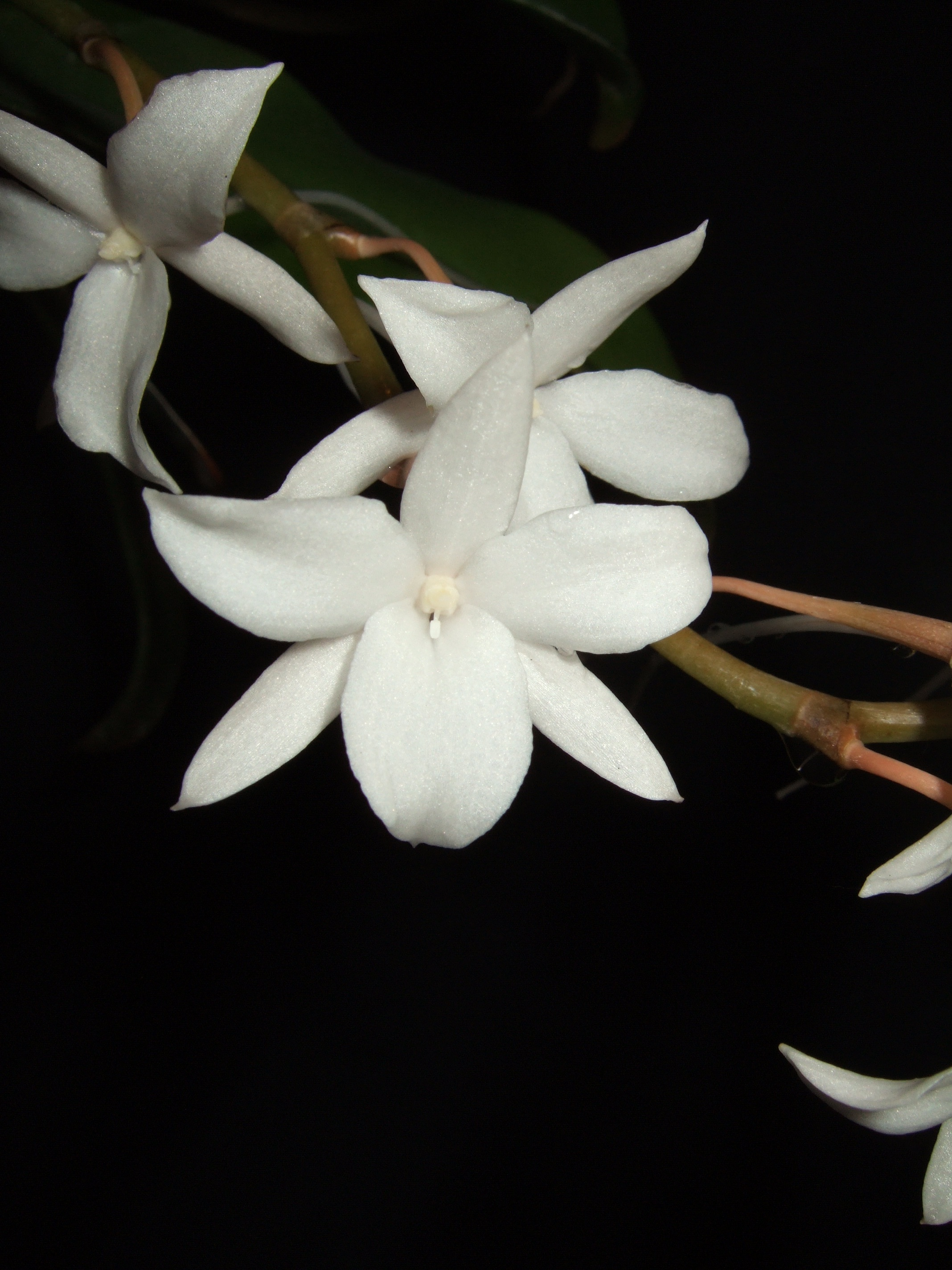

Conservation status
- Least Concern (IUCN 3.1)

Scientific classification
- Kingdom: Plantae
- Clade: Tracheophytes
- Clade: Angiosperms
- Clade: Monocots
- Order: Asparagales
- Family: Orchidaceae
- Subfamily: Epidendroideae
- Genus: Aerangis
- Species: A. modesta

Binomial name
- Aerangis modesta (Hook.f.) Schltr. (1914)

Synonyms
- Angraecum modestum Hook.f. (1883) (Basionym); Angraecum sanderianum Rchb.f. (1888); Angorchis modesta (Hook.f.) Kuntze (1891); Rhaphidorhynchus modestus (Hook.f.) Finet (1907); Rhaphidorhynchus modestus var. sanderianus (Rchb.f.) Poiss. (1912); Aerangis crassipes Schltr. (1918)

= Aerangis modesta =

Species of orchid

Aerangis modesta is a species of epiphytic orchid native to Madagascar and to the Comoro Islands.
