= Solenangis impraedicta =

Scientific classification
- Kingdom: Plantae
- Clade: Tracheophytes
- Clade: Angiosperms
- Clade: Monocots
- Order: Asparagales
- Family: Orchidaceae
- Subfamily: Epidendroideae
- Tribe: Vandeae
- Subtribe: Angraecinae
- Genus: Solenangis
- Species: S. impraedicta

Binomial name
- Solenangis impraedicta Stévart, Farminhão, Savignac, Verlynde & Ramand.
- It is native to Madagascar

Species of flowering plant

Solenangis impraedicta is an orchid that was described in early 2024. It was found in central Madagascar where it is pollinated by hawkmoths. Scientists noted how this orchid has an extremely long nectar spur, measuring in at about 33 cm (13 in) long.

== Description ==
The flowers are 2 cm wide. The spur is 33 cm long.

== Taxonomy ==
It was published by Tariq Stévart, João N. M. Farminhão, Marie Savignac, Simon Verlynde, and Brigitte Ramandimbisoa in 2024.

=== Etymology ===
The specific epithet impraedicta means unpredicted.

== Ecology ==
=== Pollination ===
It is likely pollinated by hawk moths. The most likely pollinator species are Xanthopan praedicta and Coelonia solani.

== Conservation ==
It is a rare species and may be threatened by mining and the collection of plants from their natural habitat. The exact location of the populations are not disclosed, due to conservation concerns.
