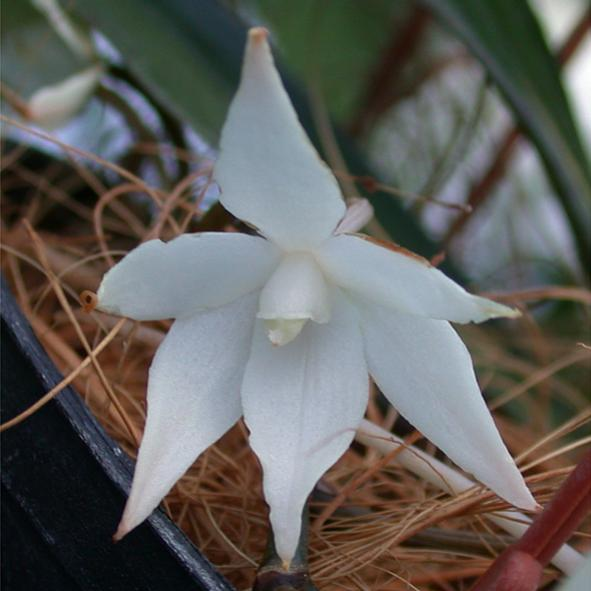

Scientific classification
- Kingdom: Plantae
- Clade: Tracheophytes
- Clade: Angiosperms
- Clade: Monocots
- Order: Asparagales
- Family: Orchidaceae
- Subfamily: Epidendroideae
- Genus: Aerangis
- Species: A. biloba

Binomial name
- Aerangis biloba (Lindl.) Schltr. (1915)

Synonyms
- Angraecum bilobum Lindl. (1840) (Basionym); Angraecum apiculatum Hook. (1845); Angraecum campyloplectron Rchb.f. (1855); Angorchis biloba (Lindl.) Kuntze (1891); Rhaphidorhynchus bilobus (Lindl.) Finet (1907); Aerangis campyloplectron (Rchb.f.) Garay (1972)

= Aerangis biloba =

Species of orchid

Aerangis biloba is a species of epiphytic orchid. It is native to tropical West Africa (Benin, Ghana, Guinea-Bissau, Guinea, Ivory Coast, Liberia, Nigeria, Senegal, Sierra Leone, Togo, Central African Republic, Cameroon, Gabon).
