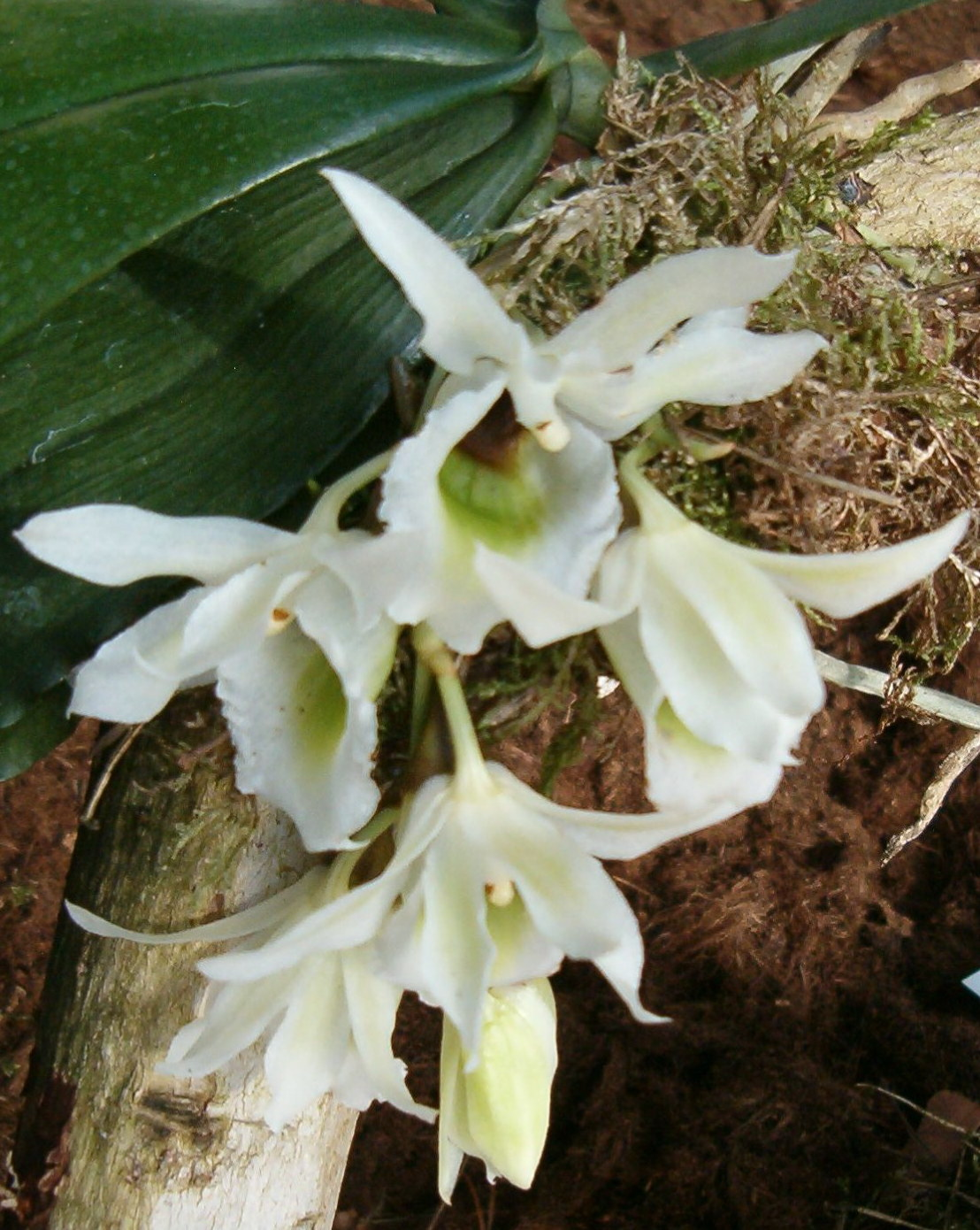
- Detail of Eurychone rothschildiana flowers
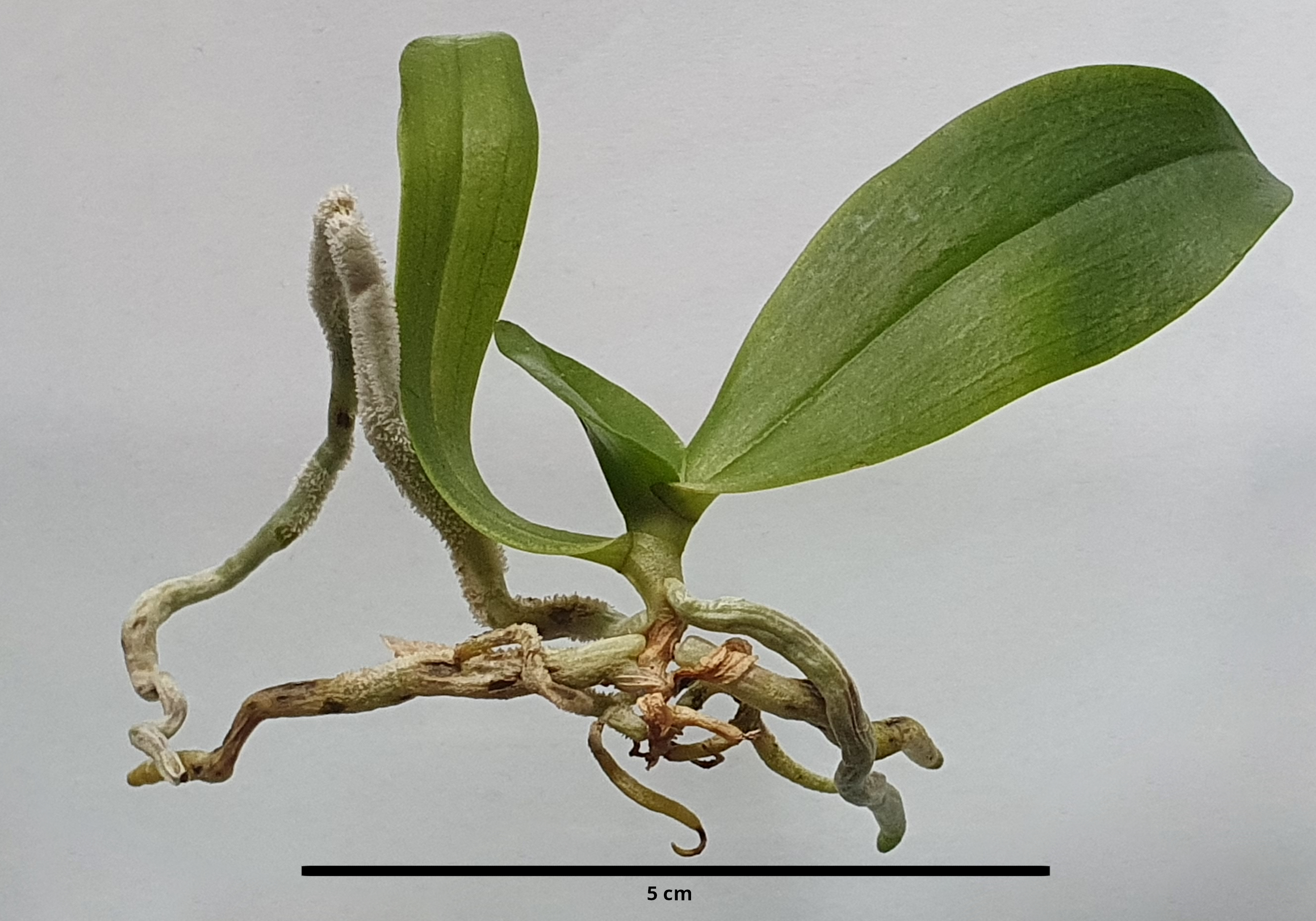
- Immature Eurychone rothschildiana specimen in cultivation

Scientific classification
- Kingdom: Plantae
- Clade: Tracheophytes
- Clade: Angiosperms
- Clade: Monocots
- Order: Asparagales
- Family: Orchidaceae
- Subfamily: Epidendroideae
- Genus: Eurychone
- Species: E. rothschildiana

Binomial name
- Eurychone rothschildiana (O'Brien) Schltr.

Synonyms
- Angraecum rothschildianum O'Brien

= Eurychone rothschildiana =

Species of orchid

Eurychone rothschildiana is a species of flowering plants in the family Orchidaceae. It is the larger of the two species in the genus Eurychone, with a range extending from Liberia to Uganda, including Nigeria, Ghana, Gabon, Congo-Kinshasa, etc. Its growth habit is monopodial, similar to those species in the genus Phalaenopsis. The flowers are born on short raceme and the flowers themselves are 6 cm across with a very broad lip. The flowers are white with the lip exhibiting a white frilled border with a large green blotch followed by either a brown or purple throat. There is also a 1.5 cm spur attached to the flower.
