= Aerangis jacksonii =

Conservation status
- Endangered (IUCN 3.1)

Scientific classification
- Kingdom: Plantae
- Clade: Tracheophytes
- Clade: Angiosperms
- Clade: Monocots
- Order: Asparagales
- Family: Orchidaceae
- Subfamily: Epidendroideae
- Genus: Aerangis
- Species: A. jacksonii

Binomial name
- Aerangis jacksonii J.Stewart (1978)

Species of orchid

Aerangis jacksonii is a species of epiphytic orchid native to Uganda which primarily grows in a wet tropical biome.
