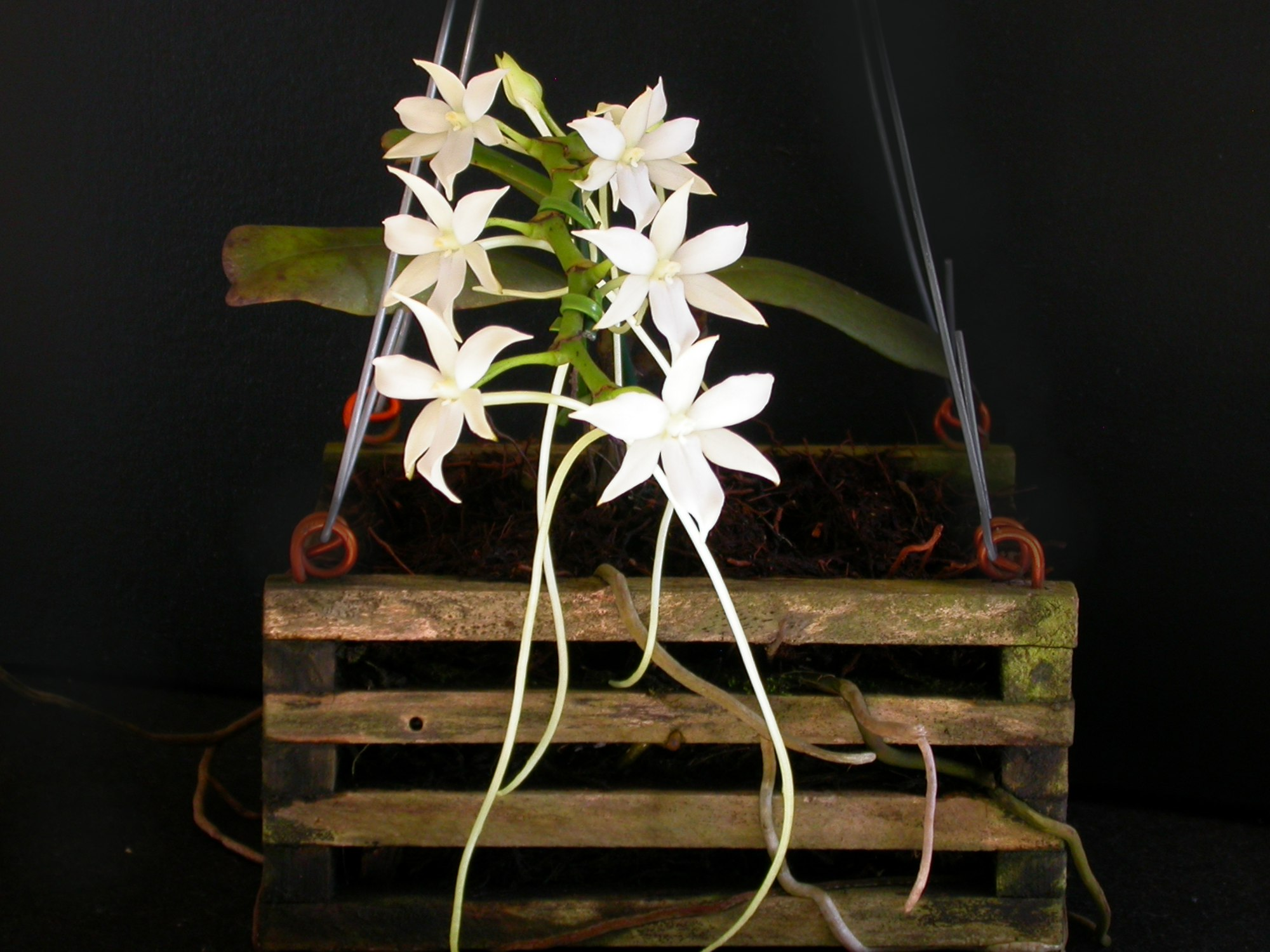

Scientific classification
- Kingdom: Plantae
- Clade: Tracheophytes
- Clade: Angiosperms
- Clade: Monocots
- Order: Asparagales
- Family: Orchidaceae
- Subfamily: Epidendroideae
- Genus: Aerangis
- Species: A. articulata

Binomial name
- Aerangis articulata (Rchb.f.) Schltr. (1914)

Synonyms
- Angraecum articulatum Rchb.f. (1872) (Basionym); Angraecum descendens Rchb.f. (1882); Angraecum calligerum Rchb.f. (1887); Angorchis articulata (Rchb.f.) Kuntze (1891); Rhaphidorhynchus articulatus (Rchb.f.) Poiss. (1912); Aerangis venusta Schltr. (1918); Aerangis calligera (Rchb.f.) Garay (1974)

= Aerangis articulata =

Species of orchid

Aerangis articulata is a species of epiphytic orchid. It is native to Madagascar and the Comoro Islands.
