= Triceratorhynchus =

Scientific classification
- Kingdom: Plantae
- Clade: Tracheophytes
- Clade: Angiosperms
- Clade: Monocots
- Order: Asparagales
- Family: Orchidaceae
- Subfamily: Epidendroideae
- Tribe: Vandeae
- Subtribe: Angraecinae
- Genus: Triceratorhynchus; Summerh.

Type species
- Triceratorhynchus viridiflorus Summerh.

Species
- Triceratorhynchus comptus (Summerh.) Szlach., Oledrz. & Mytnik; Triceratorhynchus sonkeanus (Droissart, Stévart & P.J.Cribb) Szlach., Oledrz. & Mytnik; Triceratorhynchus viridiflorus Summerh.

Synonyms
- Distylodon Summerh.

Genus of orchids

Triceratorhynchus is a genus of flowering plants of the orchid family, Orchidaceae. It is native to central Africa: Cameroon, Rwanda, Burundi, Uganda, and Kenya.

== Description ==
=== Vegetative characteristics ===
The species are dwarf epiphytes with short stems, which bear many leaves. The leaf shape is oblong or lanceolate.

=== Generative characteristics ===
The inflorescences produce one to many small, spurred, inconspicuous flowers.

== Taxonomy ==
=== Taxonomic history ===
The genus was described in 1951 by the British botanist Victor Samuel Summerhayes (1897–1974). His concept of the genus only included the type species, which he described as Triceratorhynchus viridiflorus Summerh. The other two species of the genus were formerly placed in Distylodon Summerh., which is a synonym of Triceratorhynchus. Therefore, the genus now consists of three species.

== Etymology ==
The generic name Triceratorhynchus is composed of the three Greek words tri (three), keras (horn) and rhynchos (beak or snout), which refer to aspects of the floral structure.

== Horticulture ==
The species of this genus are not cultivated.

== See also ==
- List of Orchidaceae genera
