= Summerhayesia =

Scientific classification
- Kingdom: Plantae
- Clade: Tracheophytes
- Clade: Angiosperms
- Clade: Monocots
- Order: Asparagales
- Family: Orchidaceae
- Subfamily: Epidendroideae
- Tribe: Vandeae
- Subtribe: Angraecinae
- Genus: Summerhayesia; P.J.Cribb

Genus of orchids

Summerhayesia is a genus of flowering plants from the orchid family, Orchidaceae. It has two known species, both native to tropical Africa.

- Summerhayesia laurentii (De Wild.) P.J.Cribb - Ghana, Ivory Coast, Liberia, Gabon, Zaire
- Summerhayesia zambesiaca P.J.Cribb - Zaire, Tanzania, Malawi, Zambia, Zimbabwe

== See also ==
- List of Orchidaceae genera
