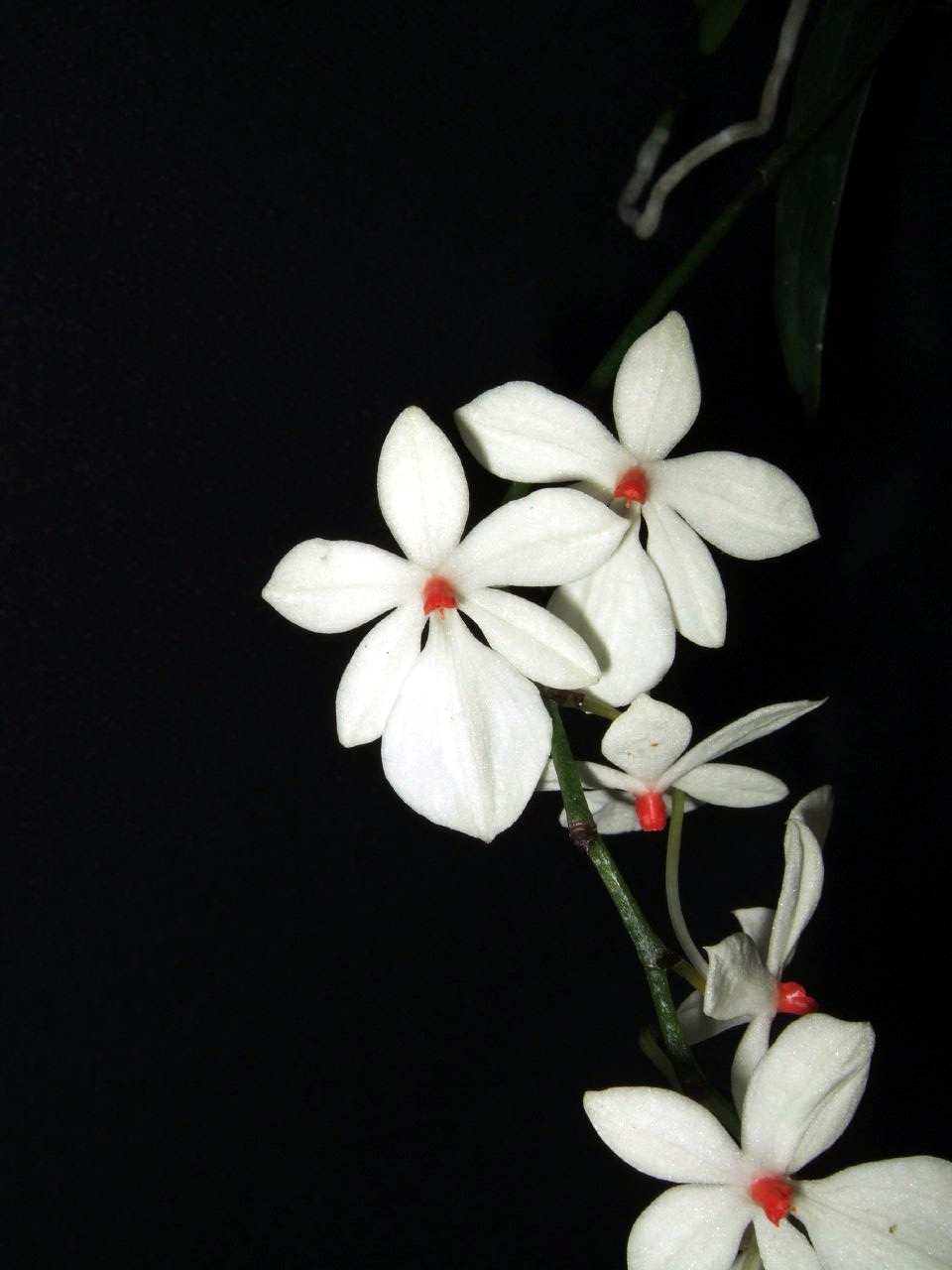
- Aerangis luteoalba var. rhodosticta

Scientific classification
- Kingdom: Plantae
- Clade: Tracheophytes
- Clade: Angiosperms
- Clade: Monocots
- Order: Asparagales
- Family: Orchidaceae
- Subfamily: Epidendroideae
- Genus: Aerangis
- Species: A. luteoalba

Binomial name
- Aerangis luteoalba (Kraenzl.) Schltr. (1918)

Synonyms
- Angraecum luteoalbum Kraenzl. (1895) (Basionym); Rhaphidorhynchus luteoalbus (Kraenzl.) Finet (1907)

= Aerangis luteoalba =

Species of orchid

Aerangis luteoalba is a species of epiphytic orchid native to eastern and central Africa. This species includes 2 currently recognized varieties:

- Aerangis luteoalba var. luteoalba - Uganda, Congo-Brazzaville, Congo-Kinshasa (Zaire, Democratic Republic of the Congo)
- Aerangis luteoalba var. rhodosticta (Kraenzl.) J. Stewart (1979) (synonyms: Angraecum rhodostictum Kraenzl. (1896) (Basionym), Angorchis rhodosticta (Kraenzl.) Kuntze (1903), Angraecum albidorubrum De Wild. (1916), Aerangis rhodosticta (Kraenzl.) Schltr. (1918), Aerangis albidorubra (De Wild.) Schltr. (1918), Angraecum mirabile auct. (1923)) - Cabinda, Central African Republic, Cameroon, Ethiopia, Kenya, Tanzania, Uganda, Congo-Brazzaville, Congo-Kinshasa (Zaire, Democratic Republic of the Congo)
