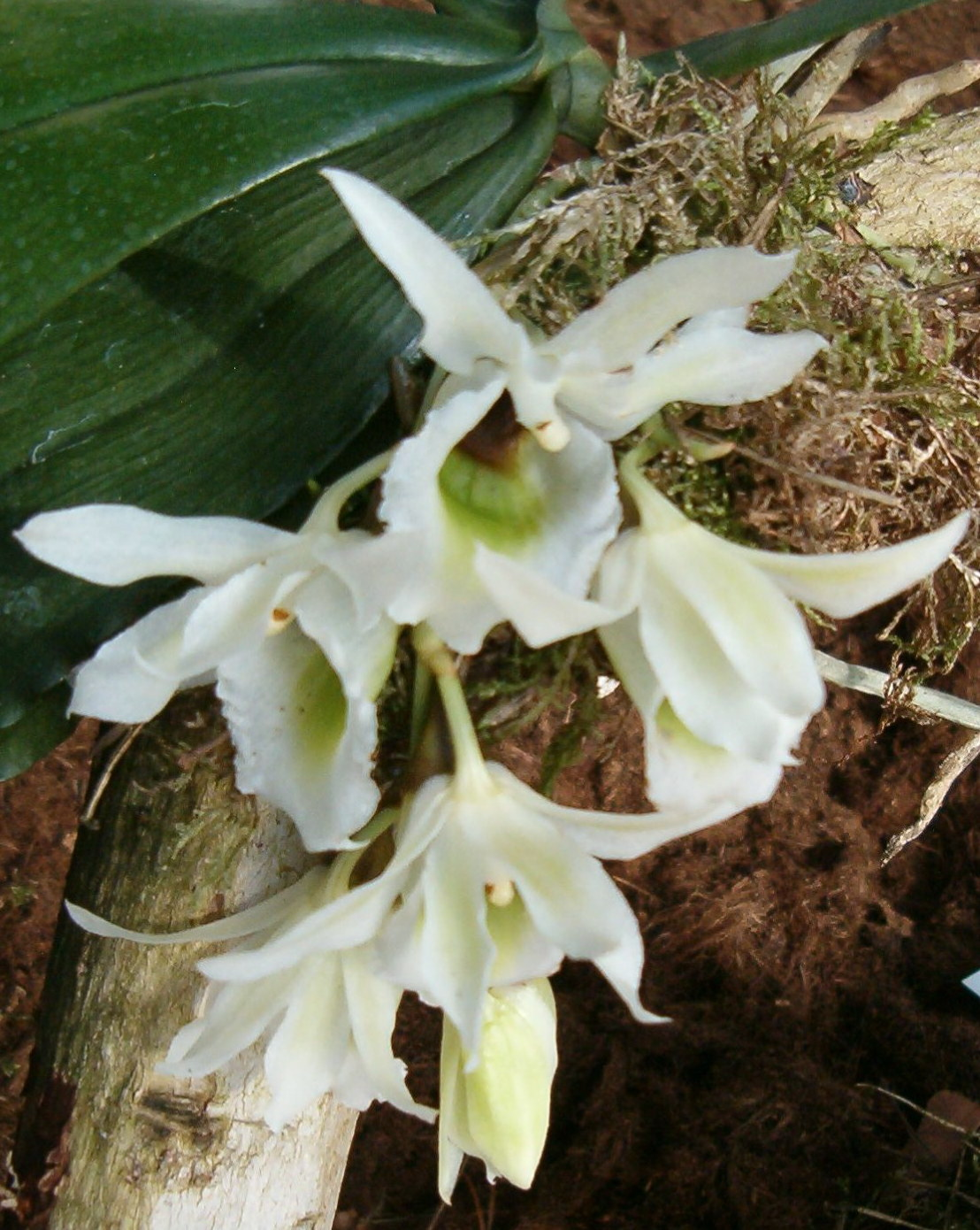
- Detail of Eurychone rothschildiana flowers
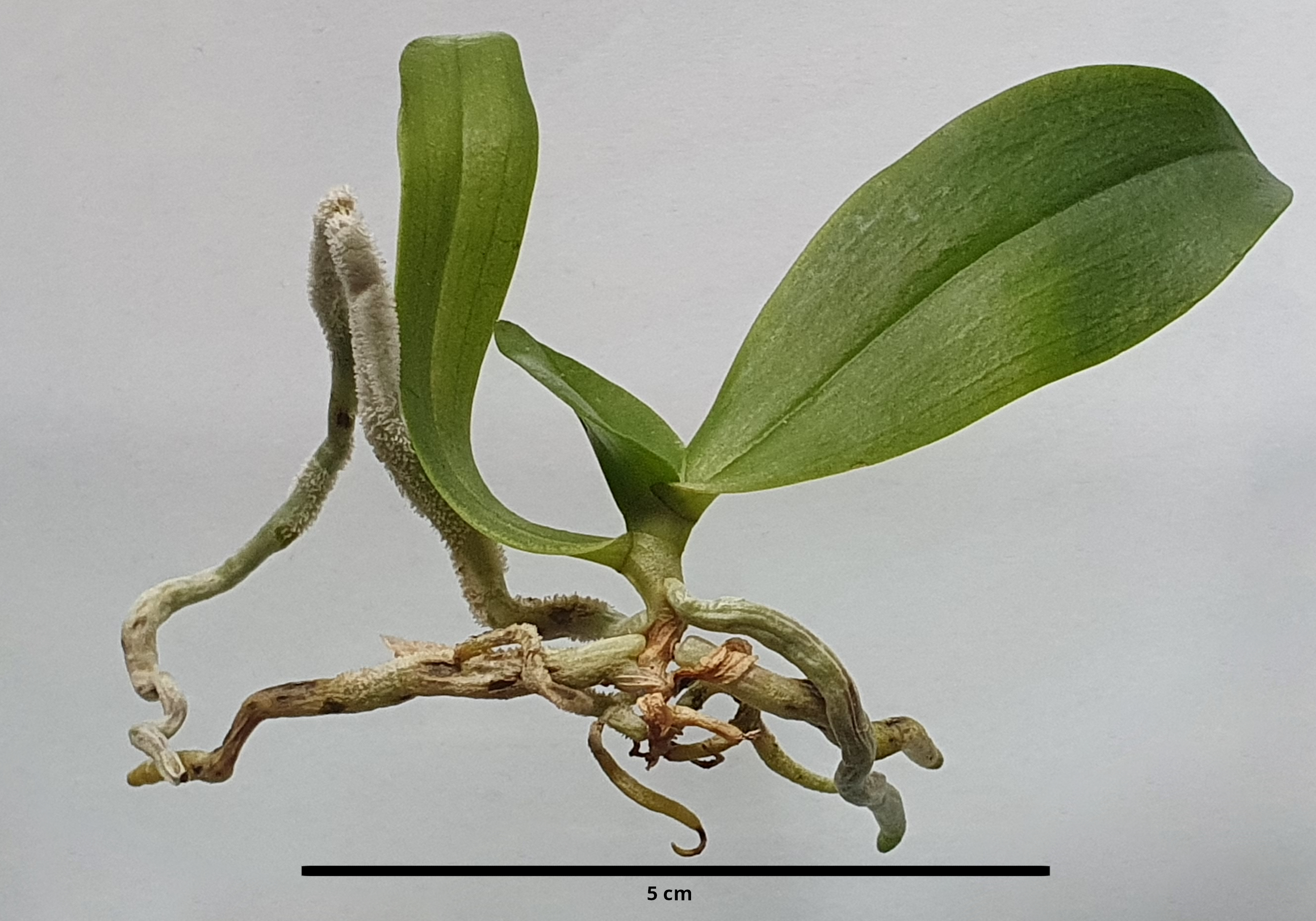
- Immature Eurychone rothschildiana specimen in cultivation

Scientific classification
- Kingdom: Plantae
- Clade: Tracheophytes
- Clade: Angiosperms
- Clade: Monocots
- Order: Asparagales
- Family: Orchidaceae
- Subfamily: Epidendroideae
- Tribe: Vandeae
- Subtribe: Angraecinae
- Genus: Eurychone; Schltr.

= Eurychone =

Genus of plants

Eurychone is a genus of flowering plants from the orchid family, Orchidaceae. The genus was founded in 1918 by Rudolf Schlechter. It contains two known species, both native to tropical Africa.

- Eurychone galeandrae (Rchb.f.) Schltr. - from Ivory Coast to Angola
- Eurychone rothschildiana (O'Brien) Schltr. - from Liberia to Uganda
