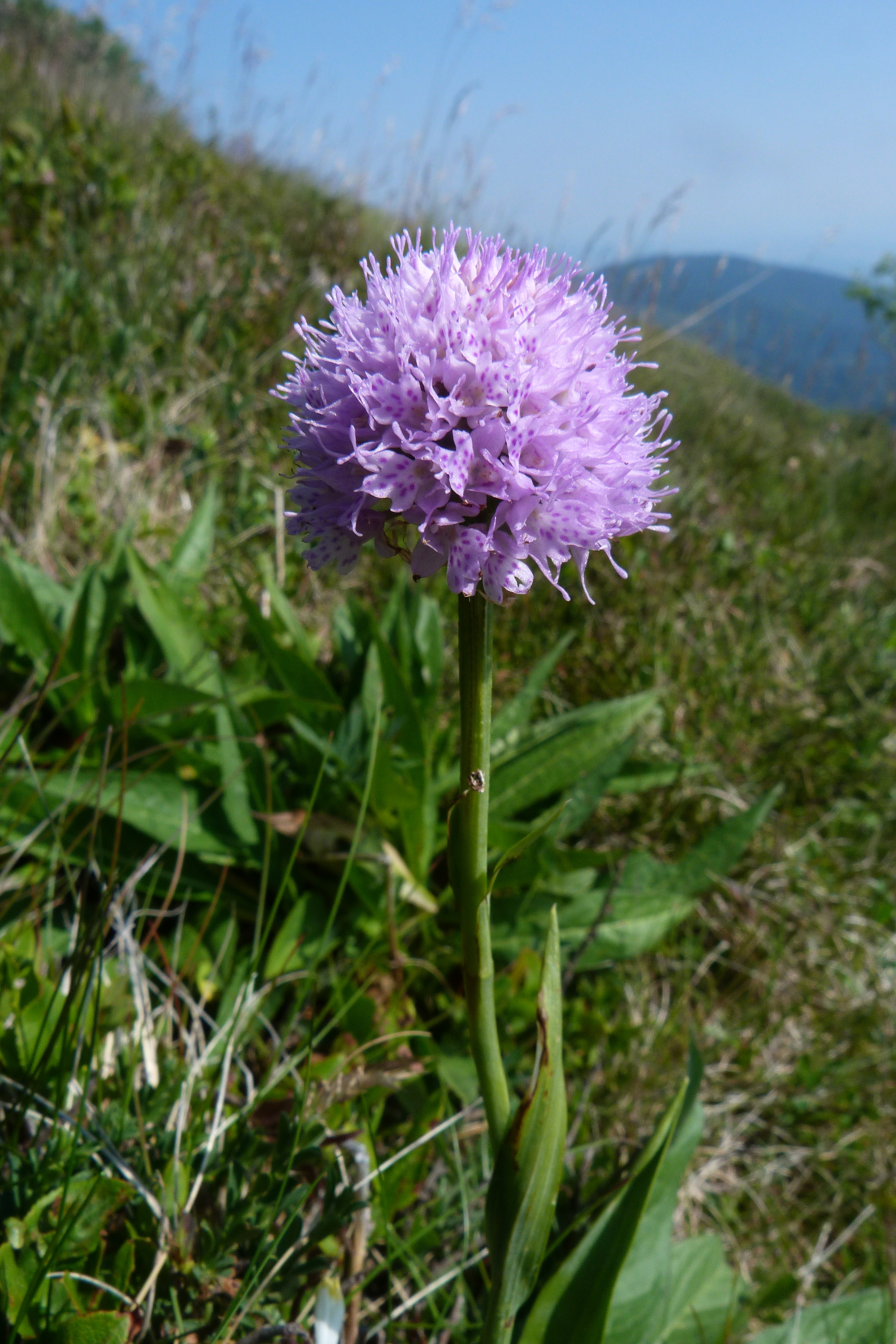
- Traunsteinera globosa near the Grand Ballon in the Vosges of southern France.

Scientific classification
- Kingdom: Plantae
- Clade: Embryophytes
- Clade: Tracheophytes
- Clade: Spermatophytes
- Clade: Angiosperms
- Clade: Monocots
- Order: Asparagales
- Family: Orchidaceae
- Subfamily: Orchidoideae
- Genus: Traunsteinera
- Species: T. globosa

Binomial name
- Traunsteinera globosa (L.) Rchb.

Synonyms
- Nigritella globosa (L.) Rchb.; Orchis globosa L.; Orchites globosus (L.) Schur

= Traunsteinera globosa =

Species of flowering plant in the Orchid family

Traunsteinera globosa, commonly known as the globe orchid, is a species of flowering plant in the orchid family (Orchidaceae).

== Description ==
Traunsteinera globosa is a slender, tall orchid growing to heights of 20 to 70 cm. Spikes bear a single, pyramidal or globular, very dense inflorescence and multiple lanceolate leaves. The flowers are pink, or very rarely white, with purple spots. The sepals and petals are around 6mm long and elongated, swelling toward the tip to form a spatula shape. The labellum is three-lobed, the middle lobe of which is sometimes toothed, the spur is shorter than the ovary, and the bracts around as long.

== Distribution and habitat ==
Traunsteinera globosa is found in full sun in mountain meadows or light woodland on calcareous to neutral soils at heights of 500 to 3000 m above sea level, though usually in excess of 1500 m.

It is found in the mountains of Central and Southern Europe from southern France to Romania, Crimea, and the Caucasus.

== Ecology ==
Taunsteinera globosa is pollinated by insects such as flies, bees, and beetles. It employs a tactic of food-deceptive mimicry, resembling the flowers of Trifolium pratense and Knautia species in order to attract their pollinators despite offering no reward. T. globosa actively benefits from greater populations of co-flowering species as it attracts potential pollinators.
