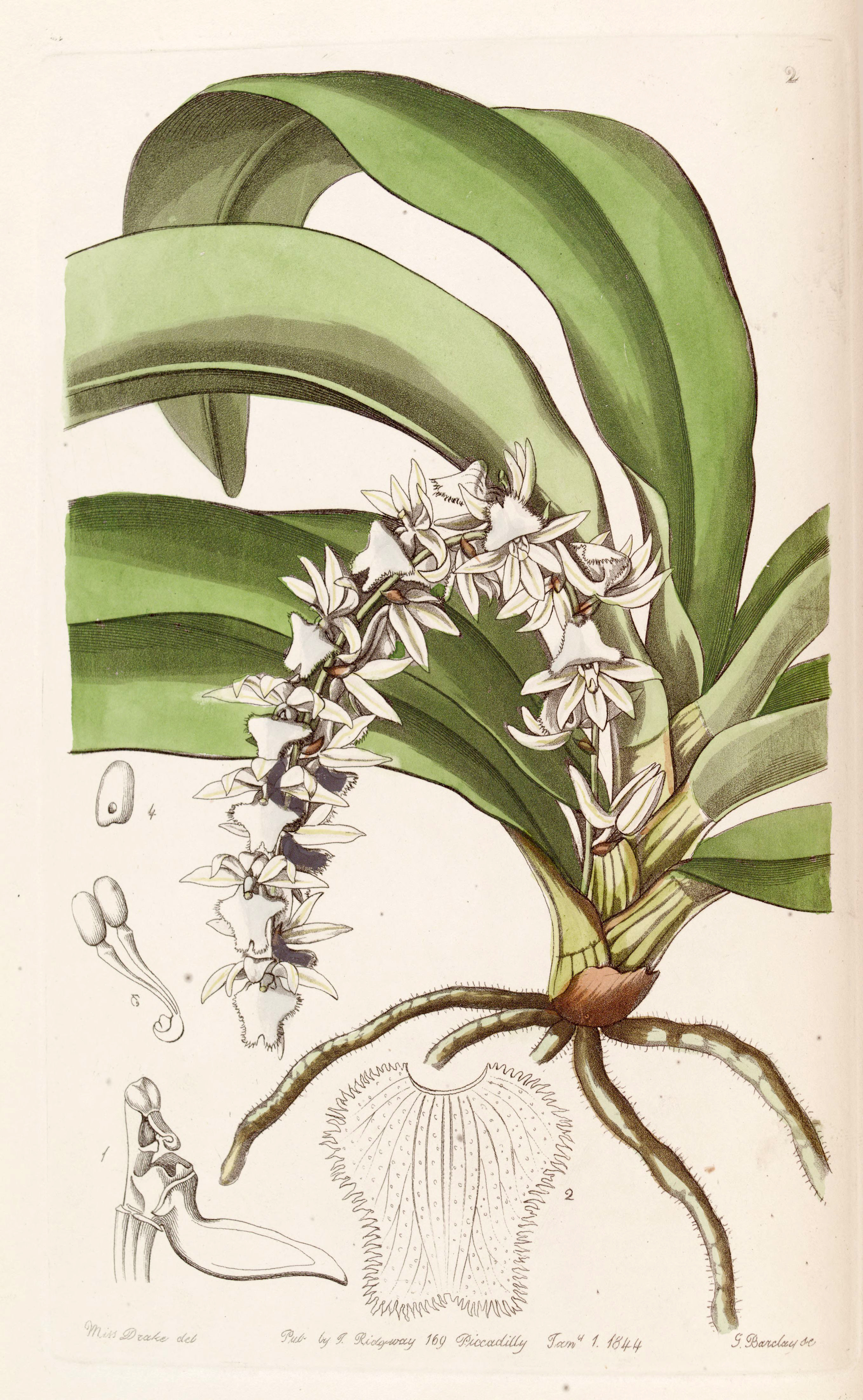
- Diaphananthe pellucida

Scientific classification
- Kingdom: Plantae
- Clade: Tracheophytes
- Clade: Angiosperms
- Clade: Monocots
- Order: Asparagales
- Family: Orchidaceae
- Subfamily: Epidendroideae
- Tribe: Vandeae
- Subtribe: Angraecinae
- Genus: Diaphananthe; Schltr. (1914)

Synonyms
- Chamaeangis Schltr. (1918)

= Diaphananthe =

Genus of orchids

Diaphananthe is a genus of flowering plants from the orchid family, Orchidaceae. As currently conceived, it contains 33 accepted species, all endemic to sub-Saharan Africa.

== Species ==
- Diaphananthe arbonnieri Geerinck
- Diaphananthe bidens (Afzel. ex Sw.) Schltr.
- Diaphananthe bueae (Schltr.) Schltr.
- Diaphananthe ceriflora J.B.Petersen
- Diaphananthe delepierreana J.-P.Lebel & Geerinck
- Diaphananthe divitiflora (Kraenzl.) Schltr.
- Diaphananthe dorotheae (Rendle) Summerh.
- Diaphananthe eggelingii P.J.Cribb
- Diaphananthe fragrantissima (Rchb.f.) Schltr.
- Diaphananthe gabonensis (Summerh.) P.J.Cribb & Carlsward
- Diaphananthe garayana Szlach. & Olszewski
- Diaphananthe ichneumonea (Lindl.) P.J.Cribb & Carlsward
- Diaphananthe lanceolata (Summerh.) P.J.Cribb & Carlsward
- Diaphananthe lecomtei (Finet) P.J.Cribb & Carlsward
- Diaphananthe letouzeyi (Szlach. & Olszewski) P.J.Cribb & Carlsward
- Diaphananthe lorifolia Summerh.
- Diaphananthe millarii (Bolus) H.P.Linder
- Diaphananthe odoratissima (Rchb.f.) P.J.Cribb & Carlsward
- Diaphananthe pellucida (Lindl.) Schltr.
- Diaphananthe plehniana (Schltr.) Schltr.
- Diaphananthe rohrii (Rchb.f.) Summerh.
- Diaphananthe sanfordiana Szlach. & Olszewski
- Diaphananthe sarcophylla (Schltr. ex Prain) P.J.Cribb & Carlsward
- Diaphananthe sarcorhynchoides J.B.Hall
- Diaphananthe spiralis (Stévart & Droissart) P.J.Cribb & Carlsward
- Diaphananthe subclavata (Rolfe) Schltr.
- Diaphananthe suborbicularis Summerh.
- Diaphananthe thomensis (Rolfe) P.J.Cribb & Carlsward
- Diaphananthe trigonopetala Schltr.
- Diaphananthe vagans (Lindl.) P.J.Cribb & Carlsward
- Diaphananthe vandiformis (Kraenzl.) Schltr.
- Diaphananthe vesicata (Lindl.) P.J.Cribb & Carlsward
- Diaphananthe welwitschii (Rchb.f.) Schltr

== See also ==
- List of Orchidaceae genera
