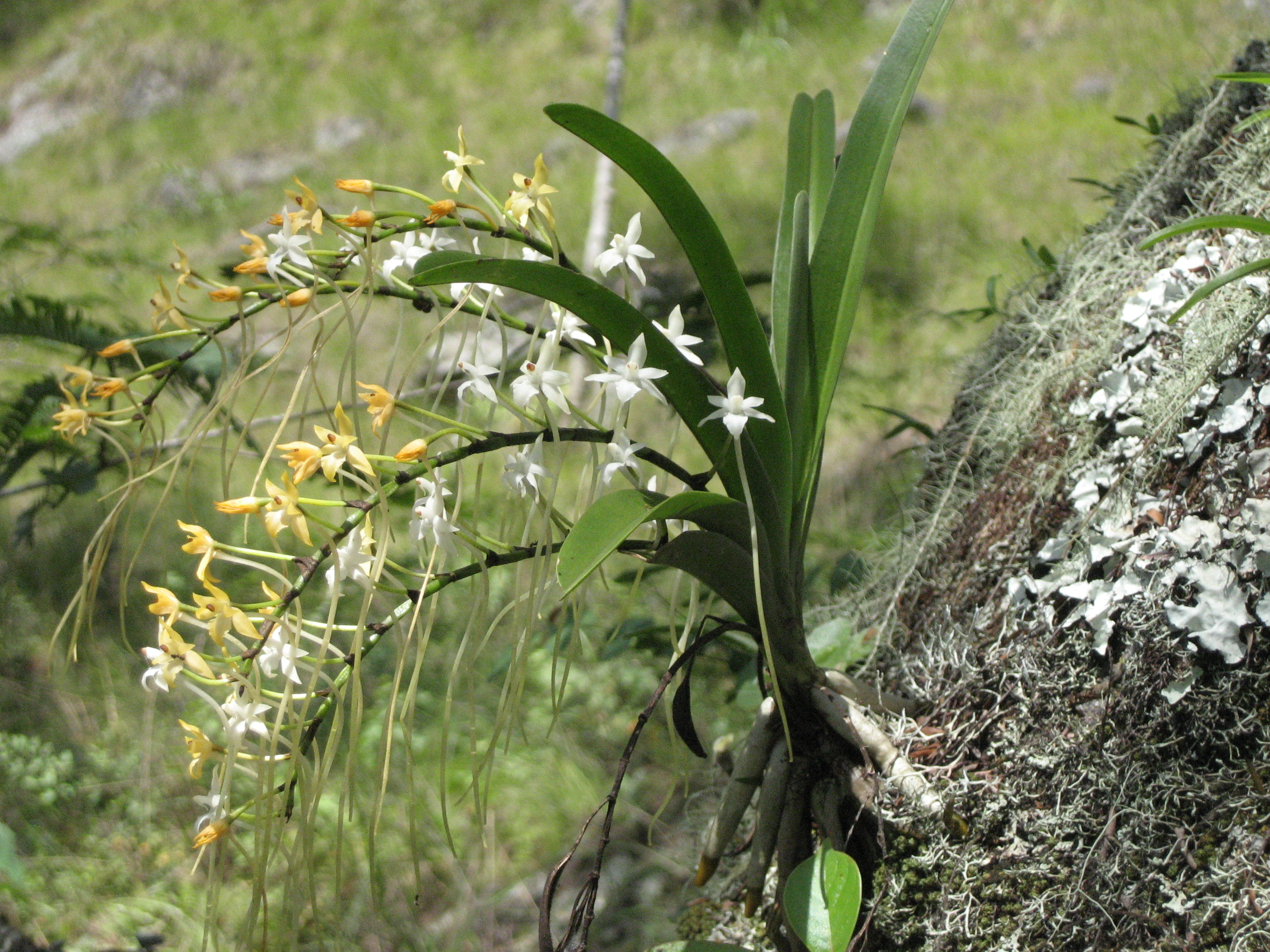
- Rangaeris muscicola

Scientific classification
- Kingdom: Plantae
- Clade: Embryophytes
- Clade: Tracheophytes
- Clade: Spermatophytes
- Clade: Angiosperms
- Clade: Monocots
- Order: Asparagales
- Family: Orchidaceae
- Subfamily: Epidendroideae
- Tribe: Vandeae
- Subtribe: Angraecinae
- Genus: Rangaeris (Schltr.) Summerh.

Synonyms
- Leptocentrum Schltr.; Barombiella Szlach.

= Rangaeris =

Genus of orchids

Rangaeris is a genus of flowering plants from the orchid family, Orchidaceae, naive to sub-Saharan Africa.

== Species ==
Species accepted as of June 2014:

1. Rangaeris amaniensis (Kraenzl.) Summerh., 1949 - Ethiopia, Kenya, Tanzania, Uganda, Zimbabwe
2. Rangaeris longicaudata (Rolfe) Summerh. in J.Hutchinson & J.M.Dalziel, 1936 - Ivory Coast, Nigeria, Cameroon, Gabon
3. Rangaeris muscicola (Rchb.f.) Summerh. in J.Hutchinson & J.M.Dalziel, 1936 - widespread from Liberia to Tanzania to South Africa
4. Rangaeris schliebenii (Mansf.) P.J.Cribb, 1989 - Tanzania
5. Rangaeris trilobata Summerh., 1936 - Nigeria, Cameroon, Equatorial Guinea, Gabon, São Tomé and Príncipe

== See also ==
- List of Orchidaceae genera
