= Rostellum =

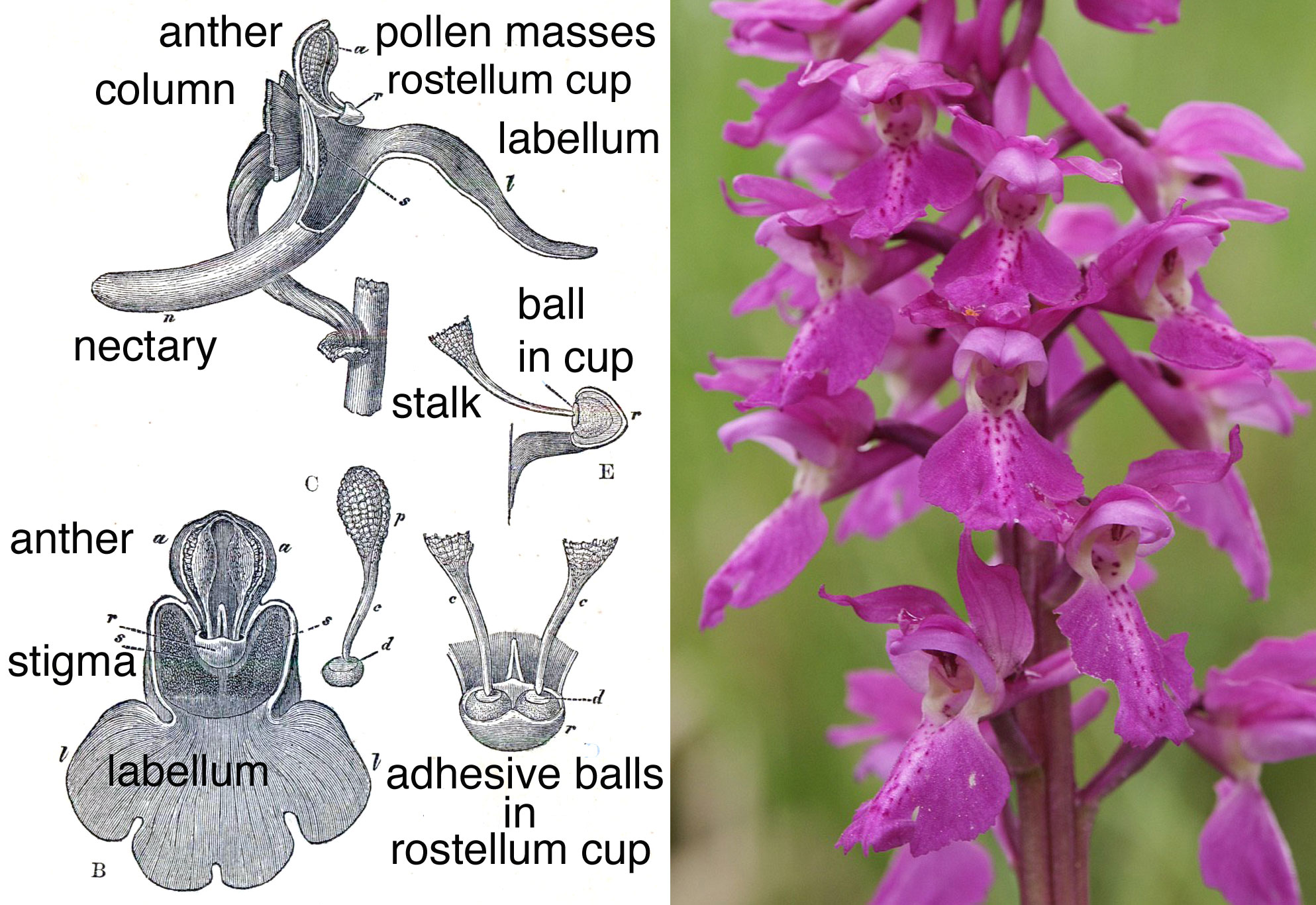
Cutaway drawing of Orchis mascula showing the rostellum projecting forward from the column to form cups which keep the adhesive balls sticky.

The rostellum is a projecting part of the column in Orchidaceae flowers, and separates the male androecium from the female gynoecium, commonly preventing self-fertilisation. In many orchids, such as Orchis mascula, the pollinia or pollen masses, are connected by stipes down to adhesive discs attached to the rostellum which forms cups keeping the discs or balls sticky.

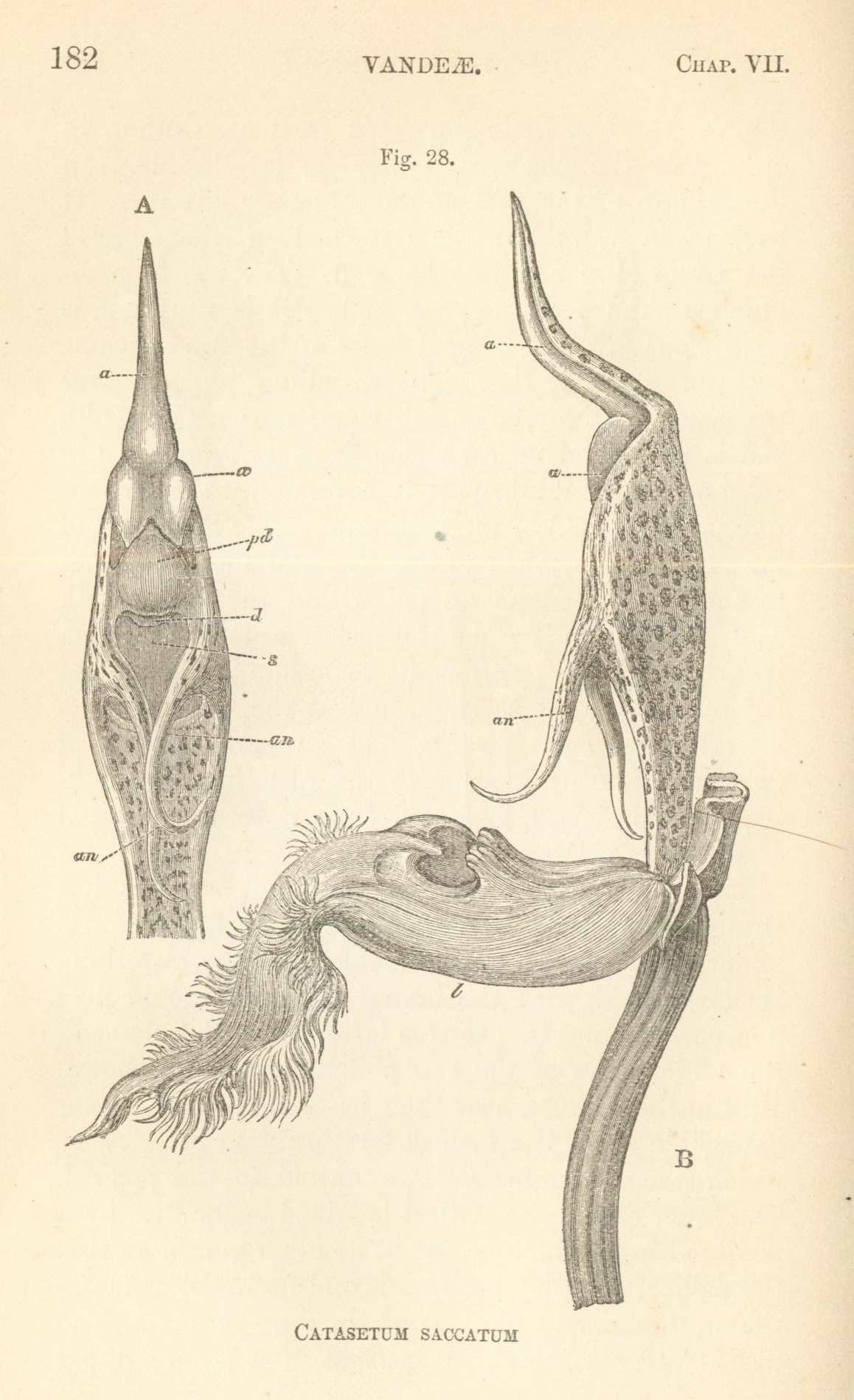
In the Catasetum flower an extension of the rostellum forms a narrow feeler or "antenna" projecting forward over the labellum.

In Catasetum flowers the rostellum projects forward at each side as an "antenna", and the pollen masses are connected by a bent stalk or pedicel to a sticky disc kept moist at the back of the flower. When an insect touches an "antenna", this releases the bent pedicel which springs straight and fires the pollinium, sticky disc first, at the insect. Charles Darwin described in Fertilisation of Orchids how he "touched the antennæ of C. callosum whilst holding the flower at about a yard's distance from the window, and the pollinium hit the pane of glass, and adhered to the smooth vertical surface by its adhesive disc."
