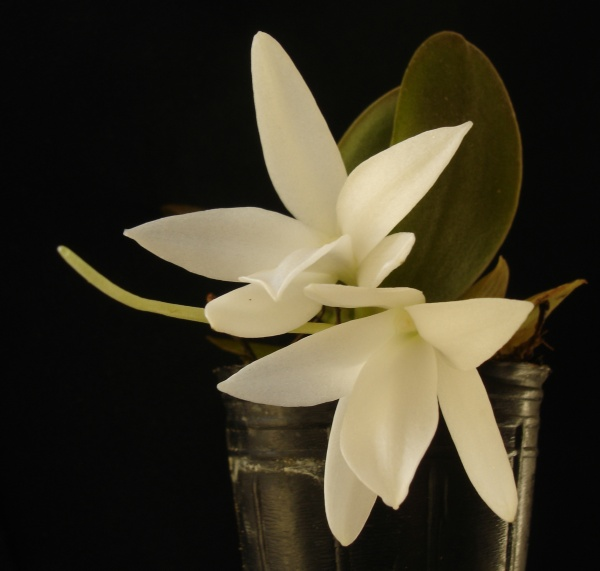
- Aerangis fastuosa

Scientific classification
- Kingdom: Plantae
- Clade: Tracheophytes
- Clade: Angiosperms
- Clade: Monocots
- Order: Asparagales
- Family: Orchidaceae
- Subfamily: Epidendroideae
- Subtribe: Angraecinae
- Genus: Aerangis; Rchb. f.

Type species
- Aerangis flabellifolia Rchb. f.

Species
- Around 57, see List of Aerangis species.

Synonyms
- × Barangis Anon.; Barombia Schltr.; Microterangis Senghas; Radinocion Ridl.; Rhaphidorhynchus Finet

= Aerangis =

Genus of orchids

Aerangis, abbreviated as Aergs in horticultural trade, is a genus of the Orchid family (Orchidaceae). The name of this genus has been derived from the Greek words 'aer' (air) and 'angos' (urn), referring to the form of the lip. It is the type genus of the subtribe Aerangidinae, which has recently been subsumed in the subtribe Angraecinae. Approximately 50 species in this genus are known mostly from tropical Africa, but also from the Comoro Islands, Madagascar and Sri Lanka.

== Description ==
Species are usually epiphytic, sometimes lithophytic small orchids, resembling Vandas in appearance. Their large, waxy, star-shaped flowers are generally white, cream-colored or yellow. They show a long, nectar-filled spur, often longer than the flower itself. There is a single stem with many flowers on a long raceme. The lip is flat and resembles the petals and sepals. They give off an agreeable smell during the night. There are six to ten parallel-veined, fleshy, evergreen leaves.

== Taxonomy ==
It was described by Heinrich Gustav Reichenbach in 1865 with Aerangis flabellifolia Rchb. f. as the type species.

== Cultivation ==
These orchids are not often found in collections, even though they are rather easy to grow. Around 15 species are commonly available. Also Aerangis' descendants from intergeneric hybridization have been registered:

- ×Aerangaeris (Aerangis × Rangaeris)
- ×Amesangis (Aerangis × Amesiella)
- ×Angrangis (Aerangis × Angraecum)
- ×Diaphanangis (Aerangis × Diaphananthe)
- ×Euryangis (Aerangis × Eurychone)
- ×Summerangis (Aerangis × Summerhayesia)
- ×Thesaera (Aerangis × Aeranthes)
