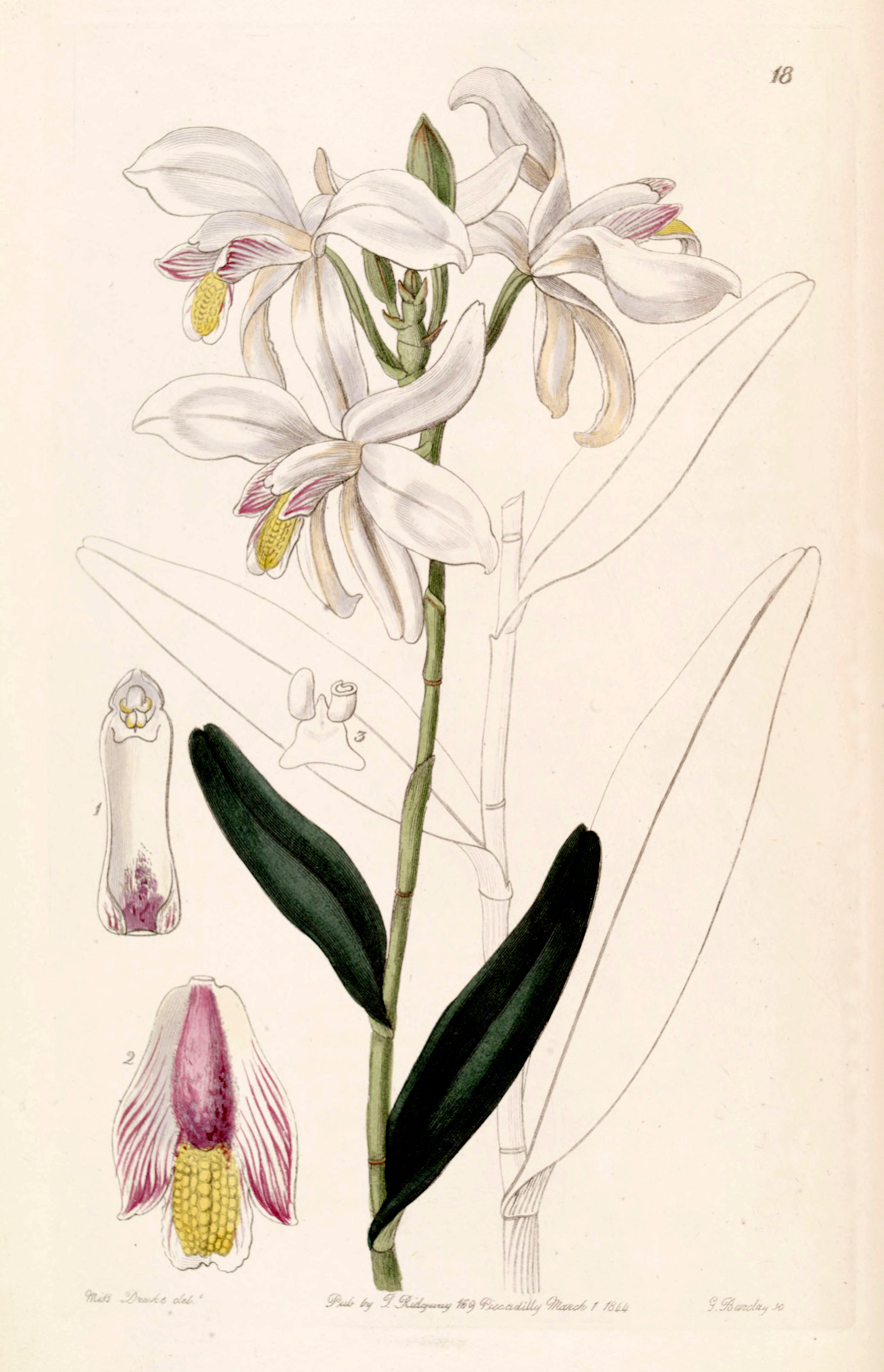
- Drawing of Bromheadia finlaysoniana (as B. palustris) by Sarah Drake

Scientific classification
- Kingdom: Plantae
- Clade: Embryophytes
- Clade: Tracheophytes
- Clade: Spermatophytes
- Clade: Angiosperms
- Clade: Monocots
- Order: Asparagales
- Family: Orchidaceae
- Subfamily: Epidendroideae
- Genus: Bromheadia
- Species: B. finlaysoniana

Binomial name
- Bromheadia finlaysoniana (Lindl.) Miq.

Synonyms
- Bromheadia finlaysoniana var. palustris (Lindl.) J.J.Sm.; Bromheadia palustris Lindl.; Bromheadia palustris var. papuana J.J.Sm.; Bromheadia pulchra Schltr.; Bromheadia sylvestris Ridl.; Bromheadia venusta T.E.Hunt; Coelogyne caulescens Griff.; Grammatophyllum finlaysonianum Lindl.

= Bromheadia finlaysoniana =

Pale reed orchid

Species of orchid

Bromheadia finlaysoniana, commonly known as the pale reed orchid and as Bromheadia pulchra in Australia, is a plant in the orchid family and is native to areas from Indochina to northern Australia. It is a terrestrial orchid with a tough upright, stem and stiffly spreading, elliptic to egg-shaped leaves. There is a long flowering stem with a short zig-zag section near the end where single flowers open in succession. The flowers are white with a yellow labellum.

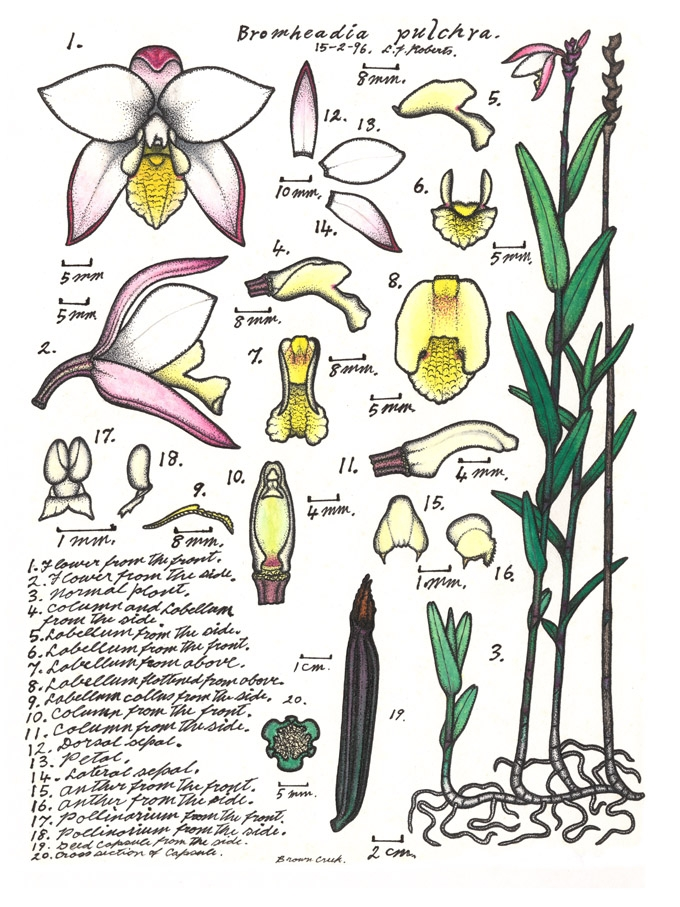
Drawing of Bromheadia finlaysoniana (as B. palustris) drawn by Lewis Roberts

== Description ==
Bromheadia finlaysoniana is a terrestrial, evergreen herb with flattened yellowish stems 1–1.5 m (3–5 ft) long with tough, stiffly spreading elliptic to egg-shaped leaves 100–150 mm (4–6 in) long and 20–30 mm (0.8–1 in) wide. The flowering stems is 100–200 mm (4–8 in) long with a short zig-zag end where up to seventy five single white flowers open in succession. The flowers are 35–45 mm (1–2 in) long, 30–40 mm (1–2 in) wide and are pinkish on the outside. The sepals are elliptic to egg-shaped, 25–50 mm (1–2 in) long and 7–9 mm (0.3–0.4 in) wide and the petals are egg-shaped and a similar length but broader than the sepals. The labellum is pale yellow, about 21 mm (0.8 in) long and 15 mm (0.6 in) wide and has three lobes, the side lobes erect. Flowering occurs between June and March in Australia and as late as October in New Guinea.

== Taxonomy and naming ==
The pale reed orchid was first formally described in 1833 by John Lindley who gave it the name Grammatophyllum finlaysonianum and published the description in his book The genera and species of Orchidaceous plants. In 1859, Friedrich Miquel changed the name to Bromheadia Finlaysoniana. The specific epithet (finlaysoniana) honours George Finlayson who collected the type specimen.

== Distribution and habitat ==
Bromheadia finlaysoniana has a wide distribution that includes Myanmar, Thailand, Cambodia, Laos, Vietnam, the Malay Peninsula, Singapore, Sumatra, Borneo, Brunei, the Moluccas, New Guinea, the Cape York Peninsula in Queensland, Australia, the Anambas Islands and possibly the Philippines, although it's uncertain whether the specimens referred to the Philippines were actually collected there. It grows in wet areas, usually near streams, 0–200 metres altitude. In Queensland, B. finlaysoniana grows from the top of the Cape York Peninsula in the north to Hopevale in the south.

A cDNA for the enzyme dihydroflavonol 4-reductase has been cloned from B. finlaysoniana.
