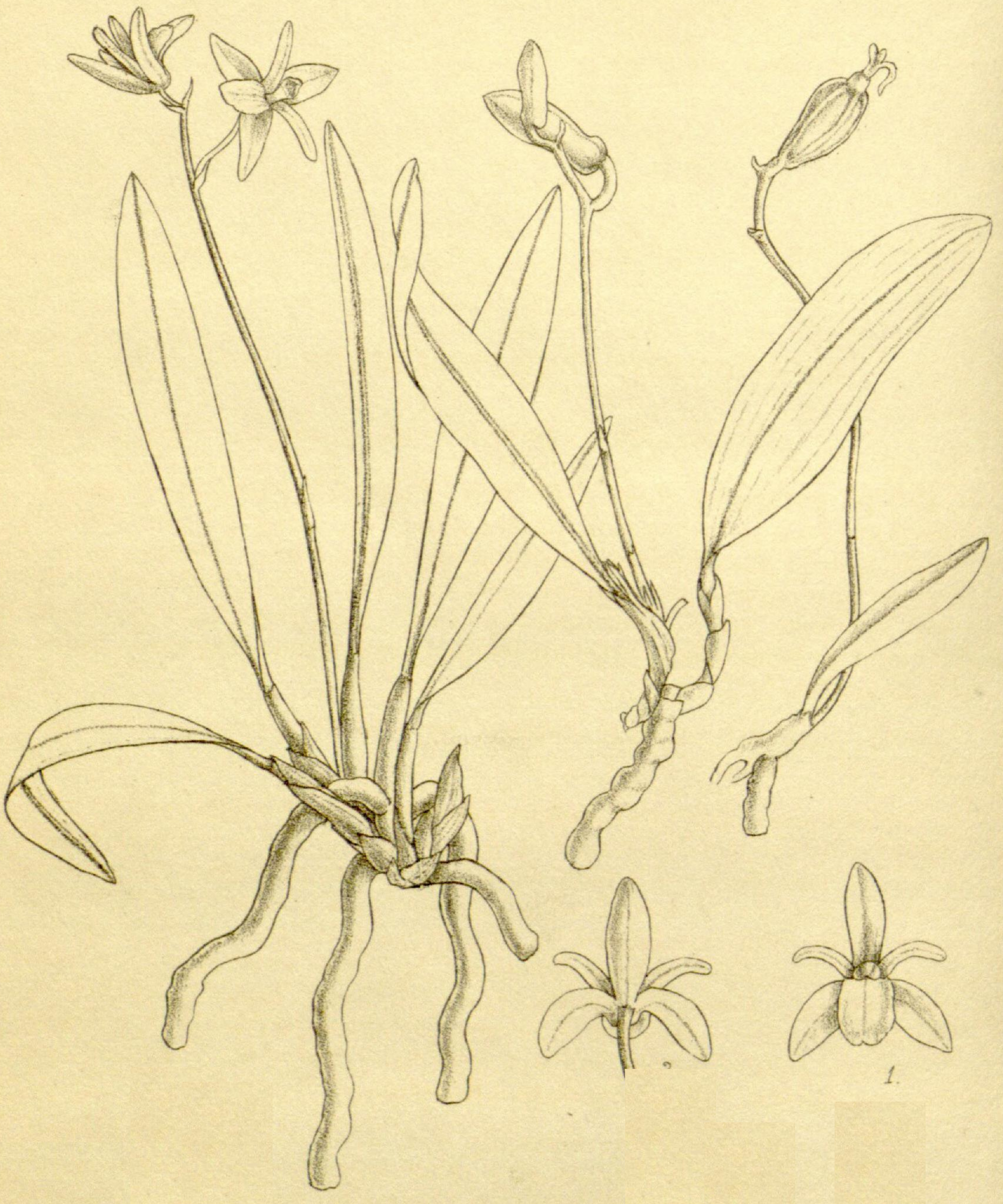

Scientific classification
- Kingdom: Plantae
- Clade: Tracheophytes
- Clade: Angiosperms
- Clade: Monocots
- Order: Asparagales
- Family: Orchidaceae
- Subfamily: Epidendroideae
- Tribe: Vandeae
- Subtribe: Adrorhizinae
- Genus: Adrorhizon; Hook.f.
- Species: A. purpurascens

Binomial name
- Adrorhizon purpurascens Hook.f.

Synonyms
- Dendrobium purpurascens Thwaites; Coelogyne purpurascens (Thwaites) Hook.f.; Pleione purpurascens (Thwaites) Kuntze

= Adrorhizon =

Genus of orchids

Adrorhizon purpurascens is a species of orchid (family Orchidaceae). It is the only species in the genus Adrorhizon and one of three genera in the subtribe Adrorhizinae.

The genus is endemic to Sri Lanka.

Adrorhizon purpurascens in Peak Wilderness Sanctuary,Sri Lanka
