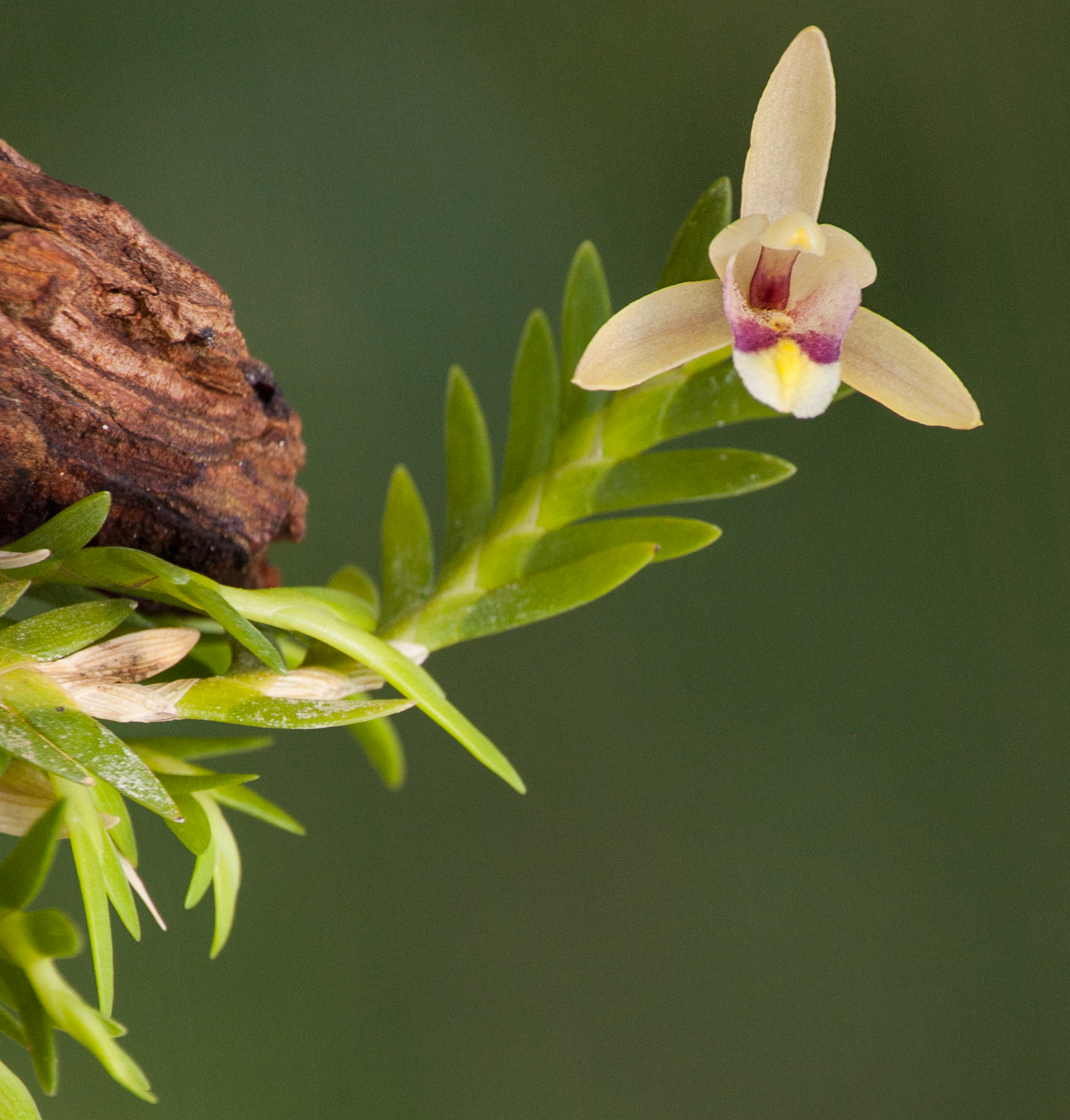
- Flowering Bromheadia brevifolia Ridl. specimen
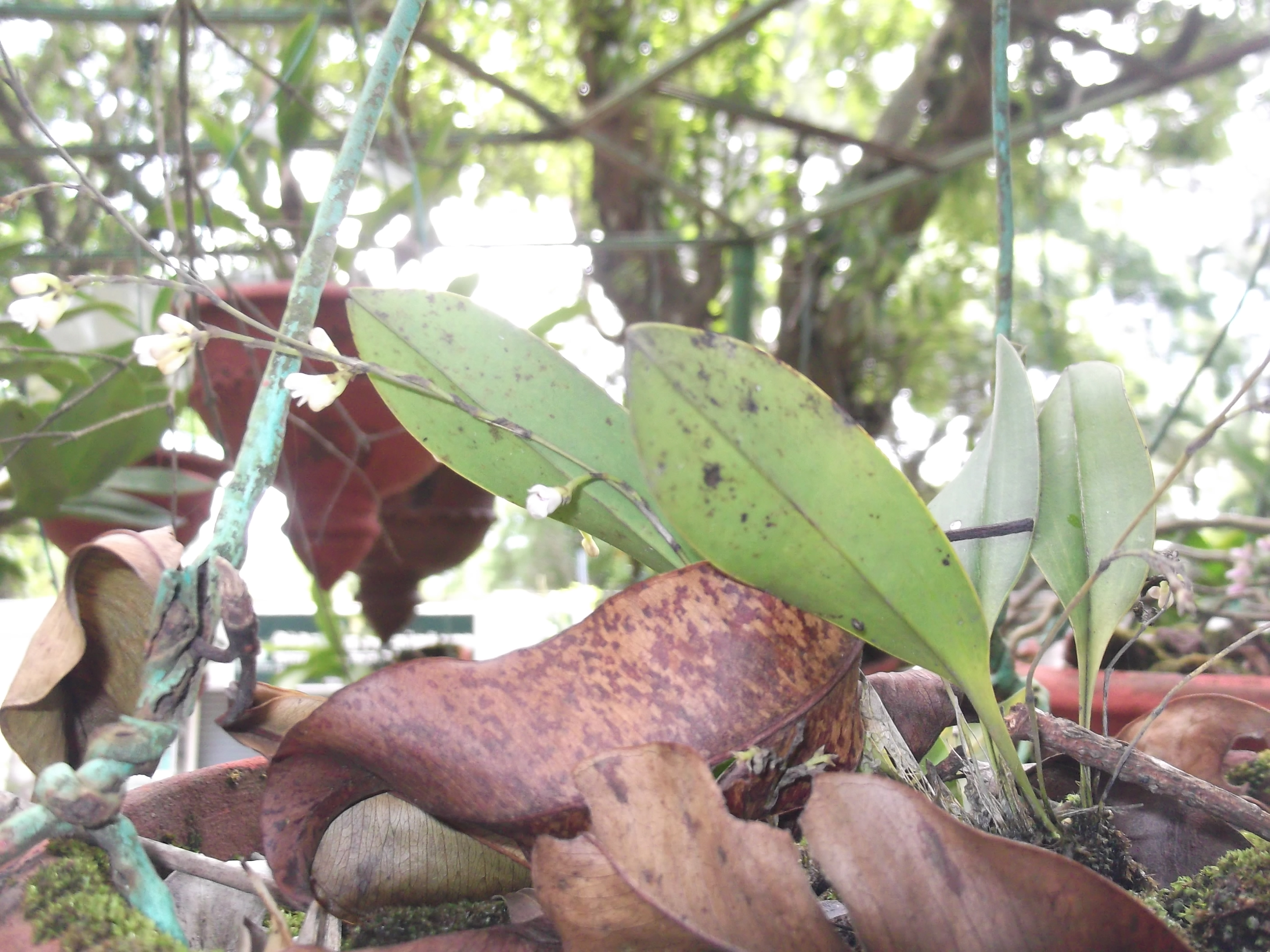
- Flowering Sirhookera lanceolata (Wight) Kuntze specimen

Scientific classification
- Kingdom: Plantae
- Clade: Embryophytes
- Clade: Tracheophytes
- Clade: Spermatophytes
- Clade: Angiosperms
- Clade: Monocots
- Order: Asparagales
- Family: Orchidaceae
- Subfamily: Epidendroideae
- Tribe: Vandeae
- Subtribe: Adrorhizinae; Schltr.

Type genus
- Adrorhizon Hook.f.

Genera
- Adrorhizon; Bromheadia; Sirhookera

Synonyms
- Bromheadiinae Dressler (1990)

= Adrorhizinae =

Subtribe of orchids

Adrorhizinae is an orchid subtribe in the tribe Vandeae.

== Ecology ==
=== Pollination ===
Pollination by ants, flies, and carpenter bees has been reported.

== Phylogeny ==
One study identified this subtribe as the sister group to the subtribes Angraecinae and Aeridinae:

- Vandeae s.l.
  - - - Aeridinae
      - Angraecinae (including Aerangidinae)
    - Adrorhizinae
  - Polystachyinae

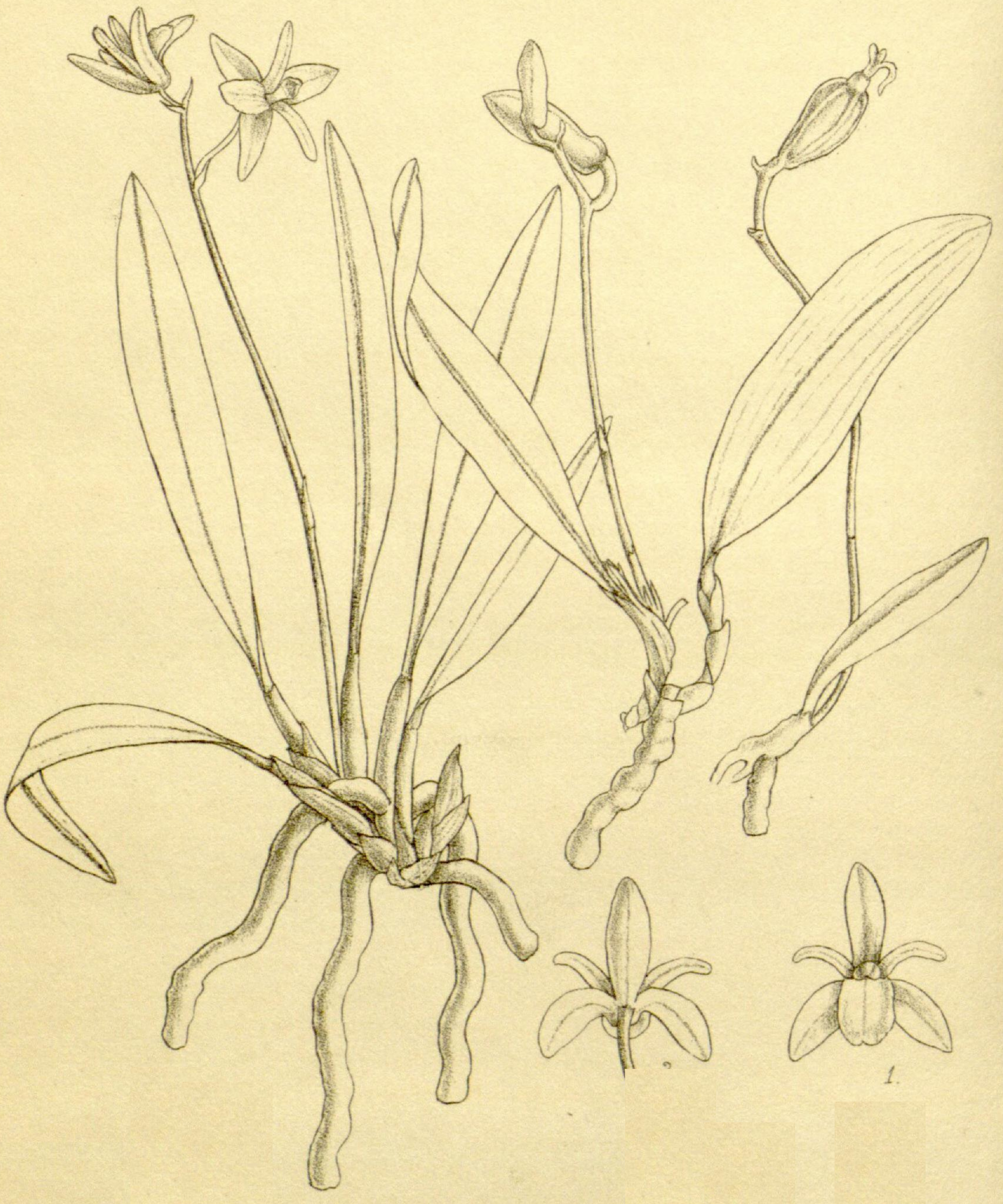
Adrorhizon purpurascens illustration

== See also ==
- Taxonomy of the Orchidaceae
