= Invasive species in the Philippines =

The following is a list of invasive alien species (IAS) in the Philippines. These species are regarded to have a negative effect on the local ecosystem and the economy, although not all species introduced from outside the archipelago are considered as "invasive". Non-native species are only deemed invasive once they harm the environment and multiply rapidly.

== Notable species ==
=== Animals ===
Picture	Common name	Species name	Introduced	Native to	Notes
	Cane toad	Rhinella marina	Nationwide	Central America	Often erroneously referred to as "bullfrogs", cane toads are the most widely distributed invasive amphibian species. Sightings has been reported in at least 24 major islands across the Philippines, and is noted to have been recorded in the Palawan island group. The species was introduced in the Philippines in the 1930s, as a pest control method in sugar cane plantations.
	Chinese softshell turtle	Pelodiscus sinensis	—	China	
	Clown knifefish	Chitala ornata	Laguna de Bay	Indochina	Regarded as an ornamental fish in the Philippines, the clown knifefish is believed to have been introduced to Laguna de Bay in 2009 due to flooding caused by Typhoon Ketsana (Ondoy). It is considered as an invasive species due to the knifefish preying on native fishes as well as introduced species cultivated for human consumption such as milkfish and tilapia.
	Eastern mosquitofish	Gambusia holbrooki	—	Southeastern United States	Introduced in the Philippines in 1905 as a means to combat malaria.
	Finlayson's squirrel	Callosciurus finlaysonii	–	Indochina	First reported in gated subdivisions and golf courses in Metro Manila, the Finlayson's squirrel has also been sighted in Batangas and Nueva Ecija. The squirrels are considered as a threat to native bird species.
	Giant African land snail	Lissachatina fulica	Nationwide	East Africa	Introduced in the Philippines in 1942 during World War II by the Imperial Japanese military from Taiwan. A crop pest.
	Golden apple snail	Pomacea canaliculata	Nationwide	South America	Introduced in the Philippines from Argentina via Taiwan in the 1980s. It was originally intended as a protein source for farmers' diet and was also kept as an aquarium pet. It is regarded as a crop pest in rice cultivation.
	Red-eared slider	Trachemys scripta elegans	–	Southern United States	Popularly kept as pets. The importation of turtles to the Philippines has been banned to manage the proliferation of the turtles in the country.
	Tilapia	Various	–	Africa	Introduced in the Philippines in the 1970s. Although the fish has been made a staple of Filipino diet, it is noted to have displaced other native fishes fit for human consumption. Wild tilapia has been recorded in Lake Sebu, Agusan Marsh, and Liguasan Marsh.

=== Plants ===
Picture	Common name	Species name	Introduced	Native to	Notes
	Hagonoy	Chromolaena odorata	Nationwide	South America	Now a prevalent weed in the Philippines, the plant was introduced in the southern Philippines in the 1960s. It also easily spreads in agricultural land reducing space for edible plants consumed by livestock. Hagonoy itself is poisonous to livestock due to its allelopathic properties.
	Water Hyacinth (Water lily)	Eichornia crassipes	Nationwide	South America	Noted to cover the Pasig River and affect Laguna de Bay during the rainy season. It competes with native plant species and covers wide swathes of surface causing low level of oxygen in the water. The plants however are recognized for their role in removing heavy metal in the Pasig River's polluted waters.
