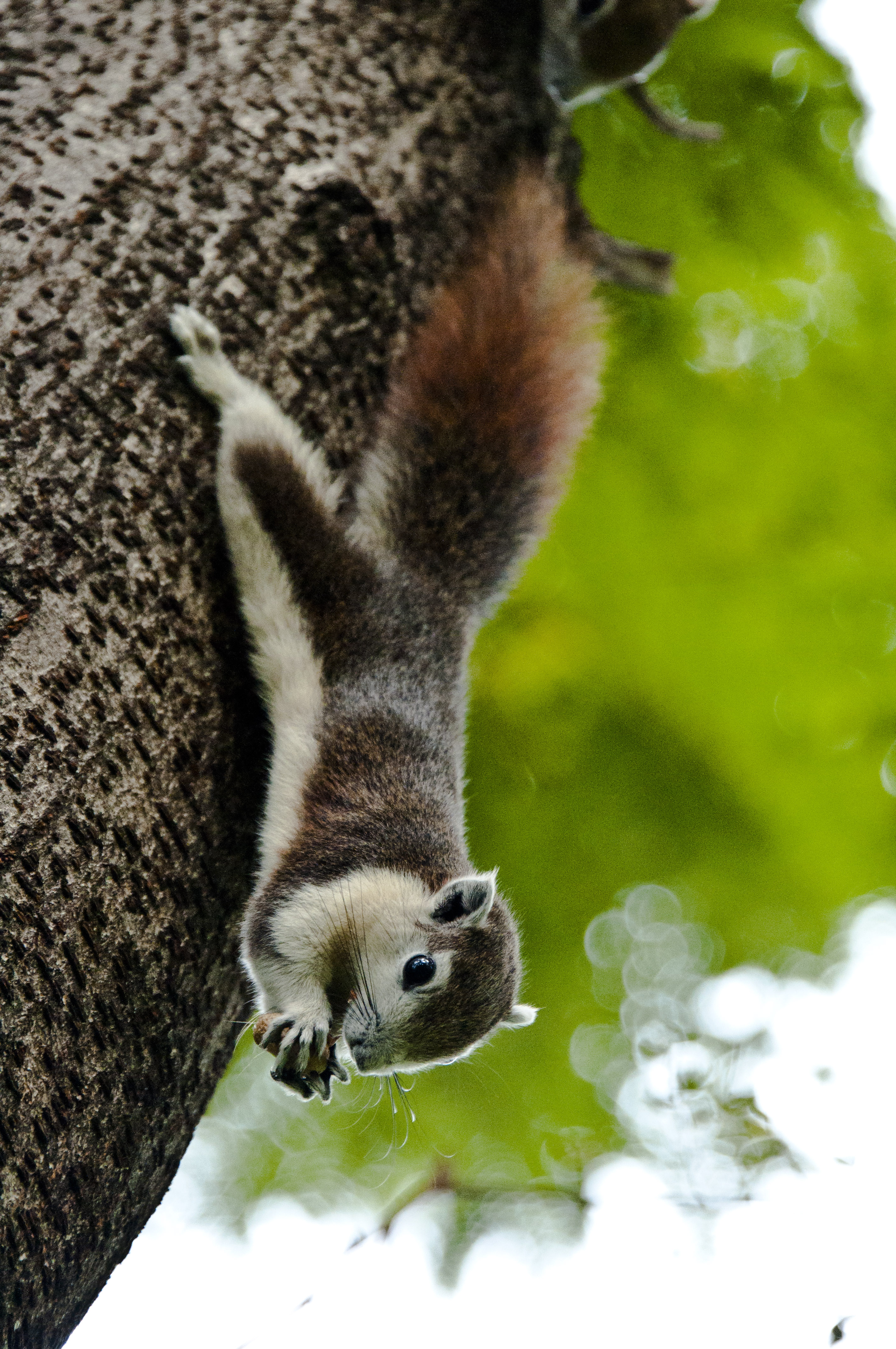
- C. f. bocourti in Bangkok, Thailand

Conservation status
- Least Concern (IUCN 3.1)

Scientific classification
- Kingdom: Animalia
- Phylum: Chordata
- Class: Mammalia
- Order: Rodentia
- Family: Sciuridae
- Genus: Callosciurus
- Species: C. finlaysonii

Binomial name
- Callosciurus finlaysonii (Horsfield, 1823)

Subspecies
- 16 subspecies: C. f. finlaysonii; C. f. albivexilli; C. f. folletti; C. f. frandseni; C. f. germaini; C. f. harmandi; C. f. trotteri; C. f. annellatus; C. f. bocourti; C. f. boonsongi; C. f. cinnamomeus; C. f. ferrugineus; C. f. menamicus; C. f. nox; C. f. sinistralis; C. f. williamsoni
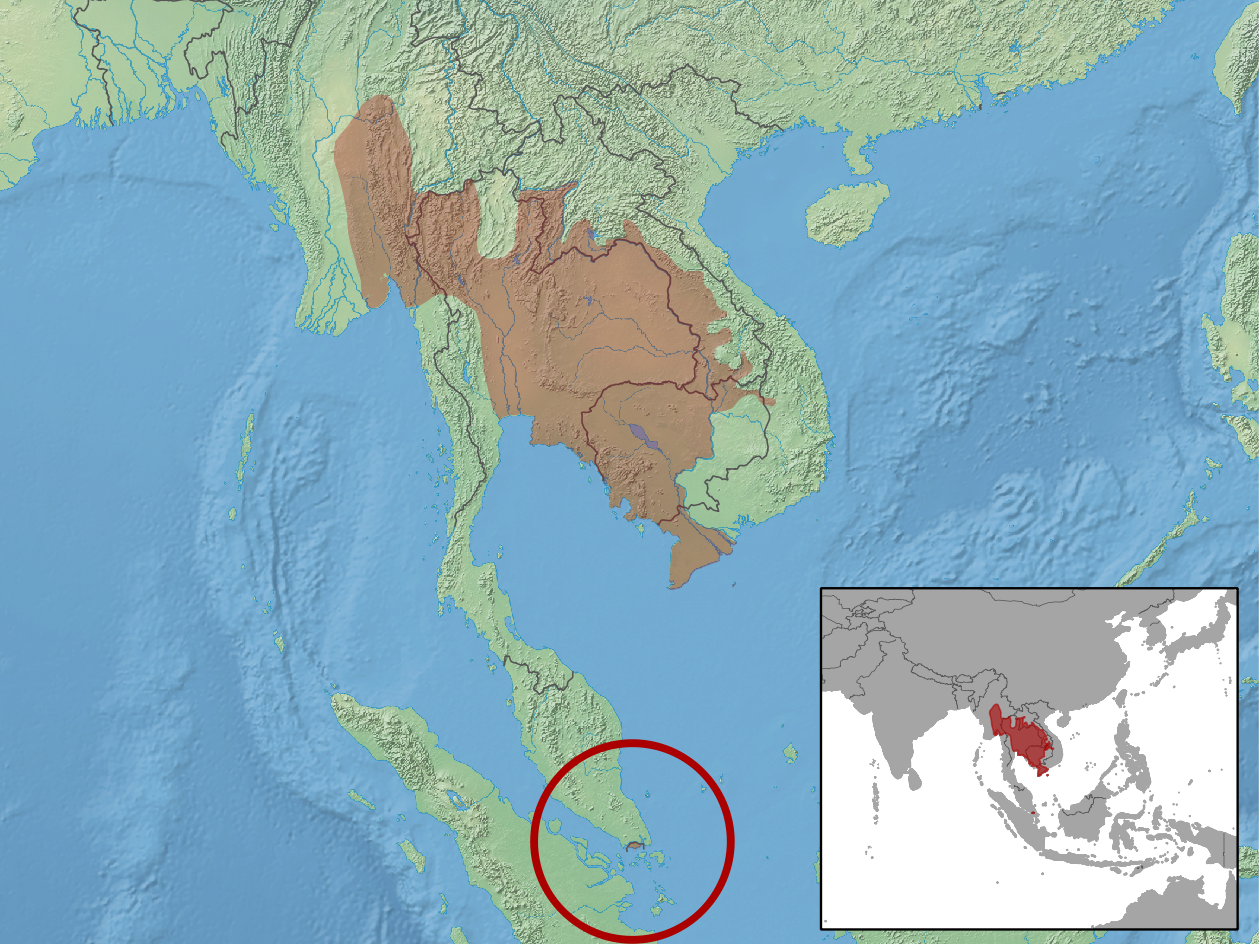

= Finlayson's squirrel =

Species of "beautiful" squirrel from Southeast Asia

Finlayson's squirrel or the variable squirrel (Callosciurus finlaysonii) is a species of rodent in the family Sciuridae. It is found in Cambodia, Laos, Myanmar, Thailand, and Vietnam. It has numerous subspecies that vary greatly in appearance and it occurs in a wide range of wooded habitats, including gardens and parks in cities like Bangkok. It was named in honour of the Scottish naturalist and traveller George Finlayson.

== Taxonomy and appearance ==
The Finlayson's squirrel has a head-and-body length of about 21–22 cm (8.3–8.7 in) and its tail is about 22–24 cm (8.7–9.4 in) long.

There are currently 16 recognised subspecies. Additional subspecies are sometimes recognised. For example, some authorities recognise C. f. floweri, while others consider it a synonym of C. f. bocourti (as done in the following colour description). The subspecific name of C. f. boonsongi commemorates Thai zoologist and conservationist Boonsong Lekagul.

The pelage colour in this species is extremely variable and the subspecies are often defined by this feature. For example, C. f. finlaysonii (nominate) is overall whitish, C. f. albivexilli, C. f. boonsongi, C. f. germaini and C. f. nox are overall blackish (first with white tail-tip, second occasionally with white underside, face and feet), C. f. annellatus is overall rufous with a light band at the base of the tail, C. f. bocourti is whitish below with highly variable colour of the upperparts (whitish, grey, blackish, olive-brownish or reddish), C. f. cinnamomeus is overall reddish with a dark mid-back, C. f. ferrugineus is reddish-brown, C. f. harmandi has brownish upperparts, orange-red underparts and light grey tail, C. f. menamicus is reddish or orangish, often has greyish legs and flanks, and sometimes a white belly, and C. f. sinistralis has grizzled upperparts, reddish underparts and reddish tail with a pale band at the base. Unnamed populations also remain (for example, a population in central Laos is shiny black with red tail and shoulder/chest region) and even within described subspecies there are often some individual variations.

As currently defined, Finlayson's squirrel may comprise more than one species. C. f. ferrugineus has been treated as a separate species. A genetic study of the 12 subspecies in Thailand, including 7 from the mainland and 5 from islands, found that they belonged in six clades, which often were separated by water (large rivers in the mainland and the sea for the islands). The study also revealed that the mitochondrial DNA of this species compared to the closely related Pallas's squirrel is not monophyletic. A subsequent study recommended that, to maintain monophyletic species, flavimanus and griseimanus, which traditionally are recognized as being subspecies of Pallas's squirrel in southeastern Indochina (central and southern Vietnam, adjacent parts of Cambodia and southern Laos), should be considered part of Finlayson's squirrel. The study also found that flavimanus, as traditionally defined, actually consists of at least two clearly separate lineages, both part of Finlayson's squirrel.

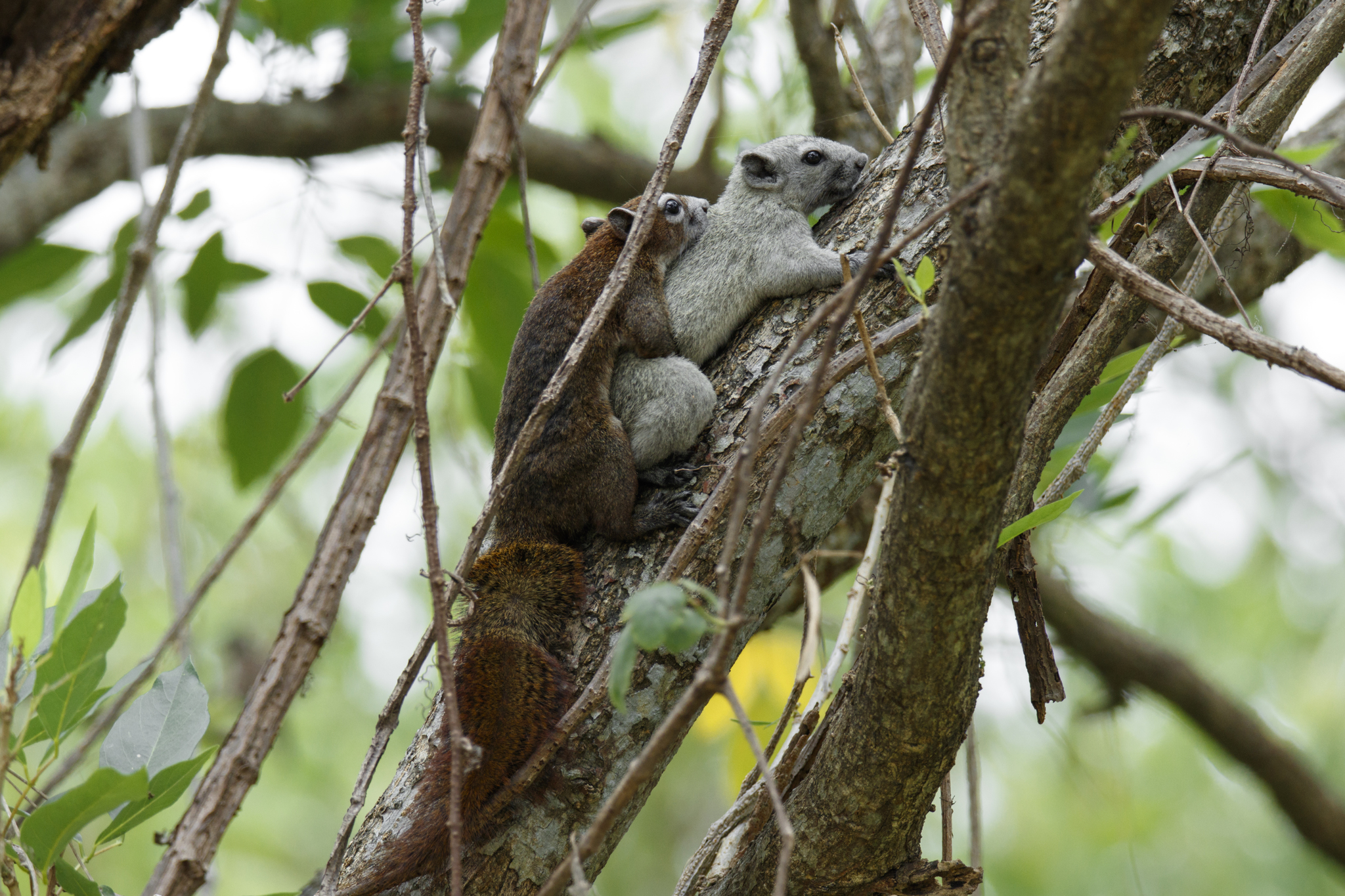
C. f. bocourti mating pair in Nonthaburi, Thailand (colour difference is individual, not related to male/female)

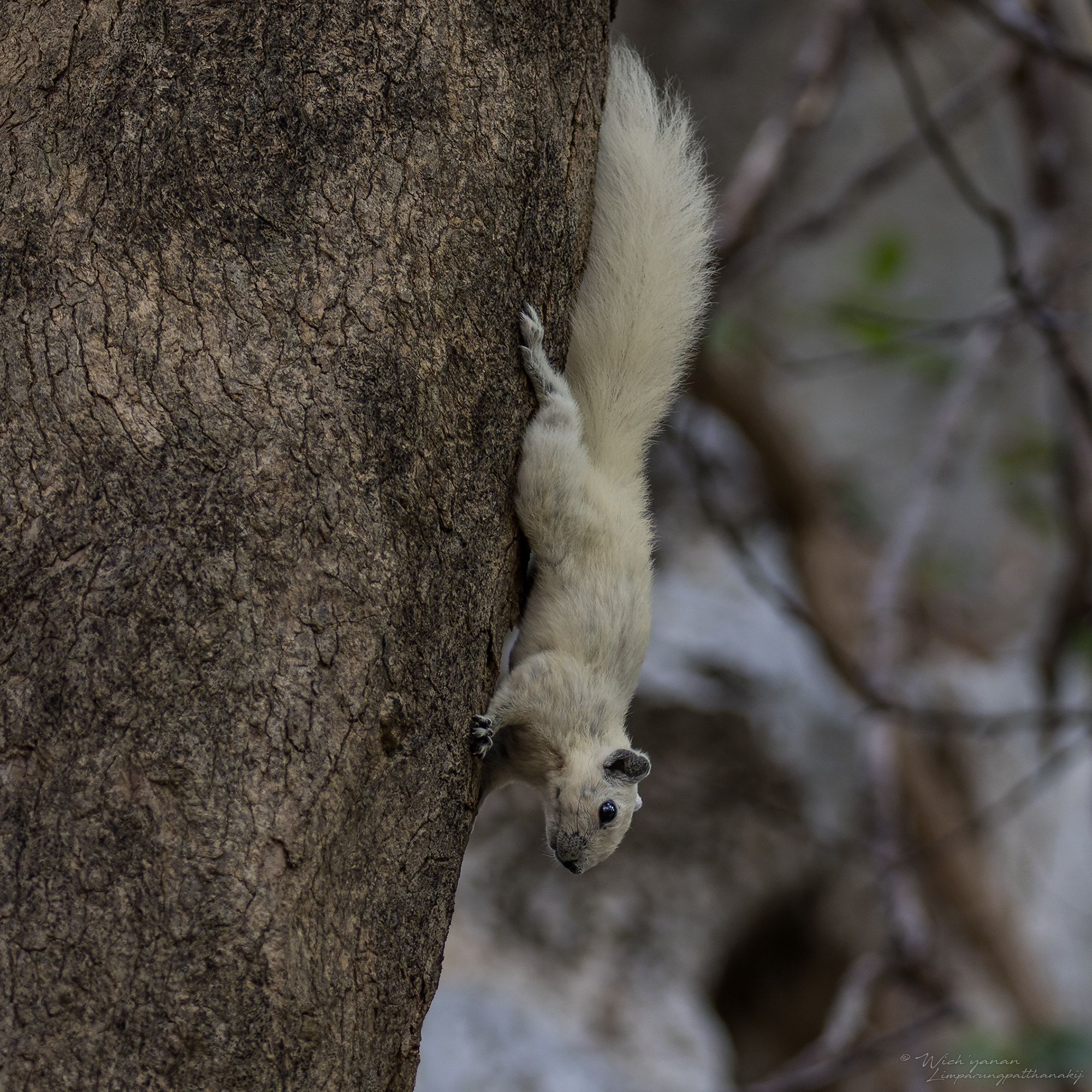
C. f. bocourti in Wang Nam Khiao, Thailand

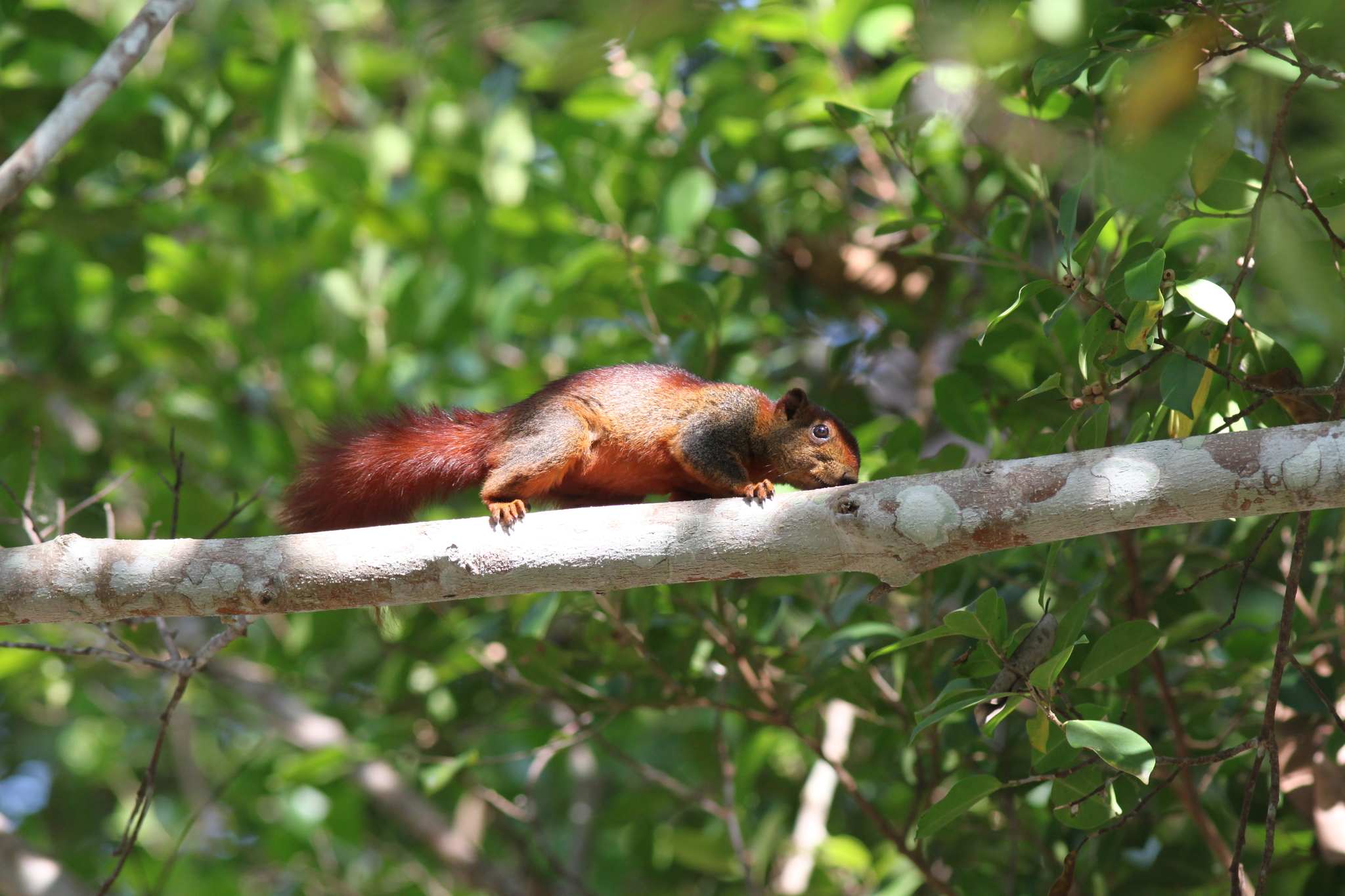
C. f. cinnamomeus in Khao Soi Dao, Thailand

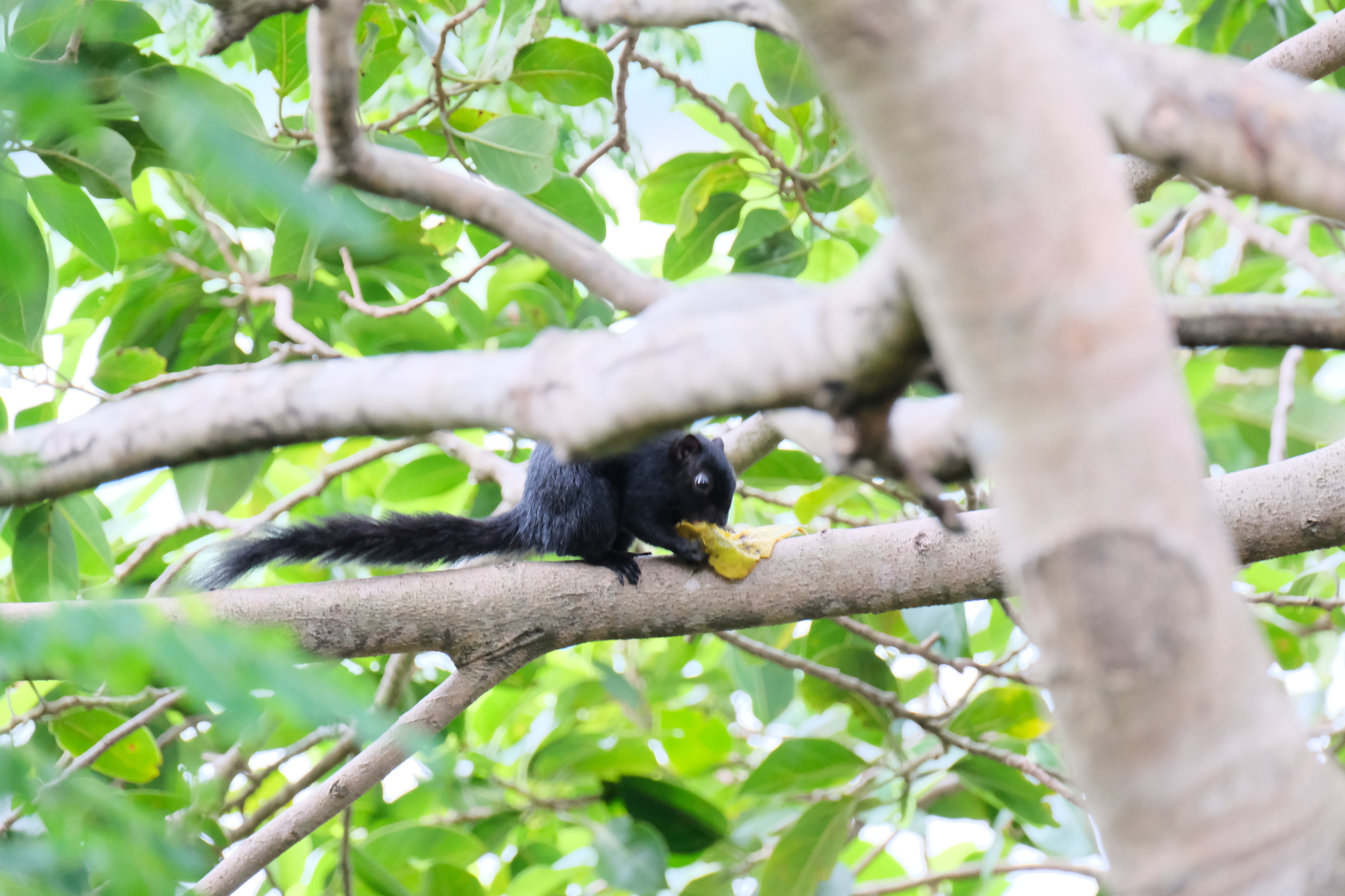
C. f. germaini on Côn Đảo, Vietnam

== Behavior ==
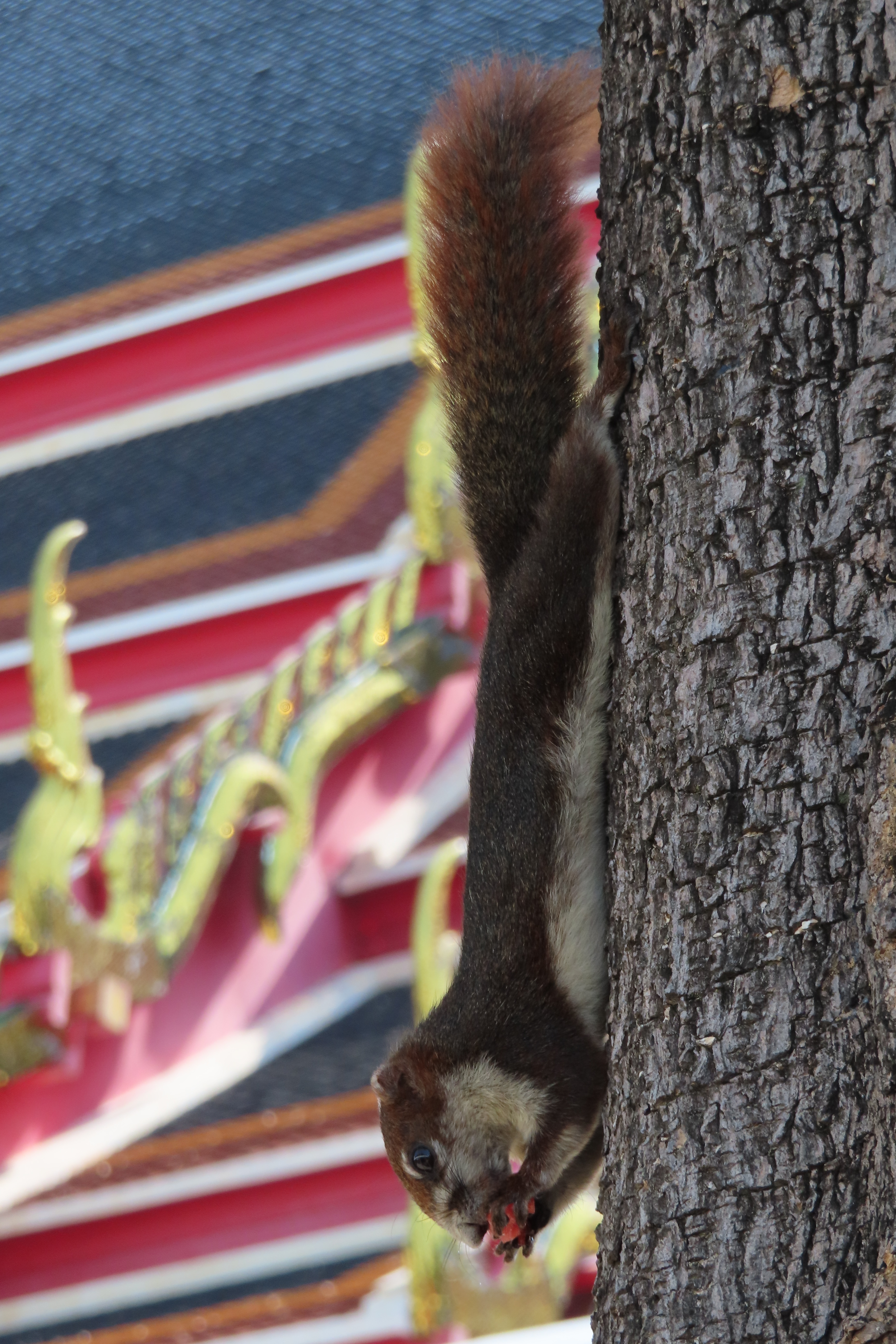
C. f. bocourti eating watermelon at Wat Pho, Bangkok, Thailand

Like other squirrels of its genus (the "beautiful squirrels", Callosciurus), Finlayson's squirrel is normally a canopy-dweller, feeding mainly on fruit. Field evidence suggests that it has the usual form of dichromatic mammalian color vision, which may enable it to discriminate ripe from unripe fruits.

== As an invasive species ==
The subspecies C. f. bocourti (syn. C. f. floweri) has been introduced to Singapore and two regions in Italy, probably a result of the species' popularity in the pet trade. It is possible that some of the Callosciurus squirrels introduced into Japan are also Finlayson's squirrels.

Finlayson's squirrel has also been introduced in the Philippines, particularly in the Greater Manila Area where it is considered an invasive species. As of April 2026, sightings of the species have been recorded in Metro Manila, Cavite, Batangas, Rizal and Nueva Ecija according to the Department of Environment and Natural Resources–Biodiversity Management Bureau (DENR-BMB); within Metro Manila, the Finlayson's squirrel has been spotted in some forested areas of Makati, Muntinlupa and Quezon City.

In the European Union, due to the significant negative impacts of its introduction to the ecosystem, it is included in the list of invasive alien species of Union concern and hence cannot be imported, bred, transported, commercialized, or intentionally released into the environment in any of its member states.
