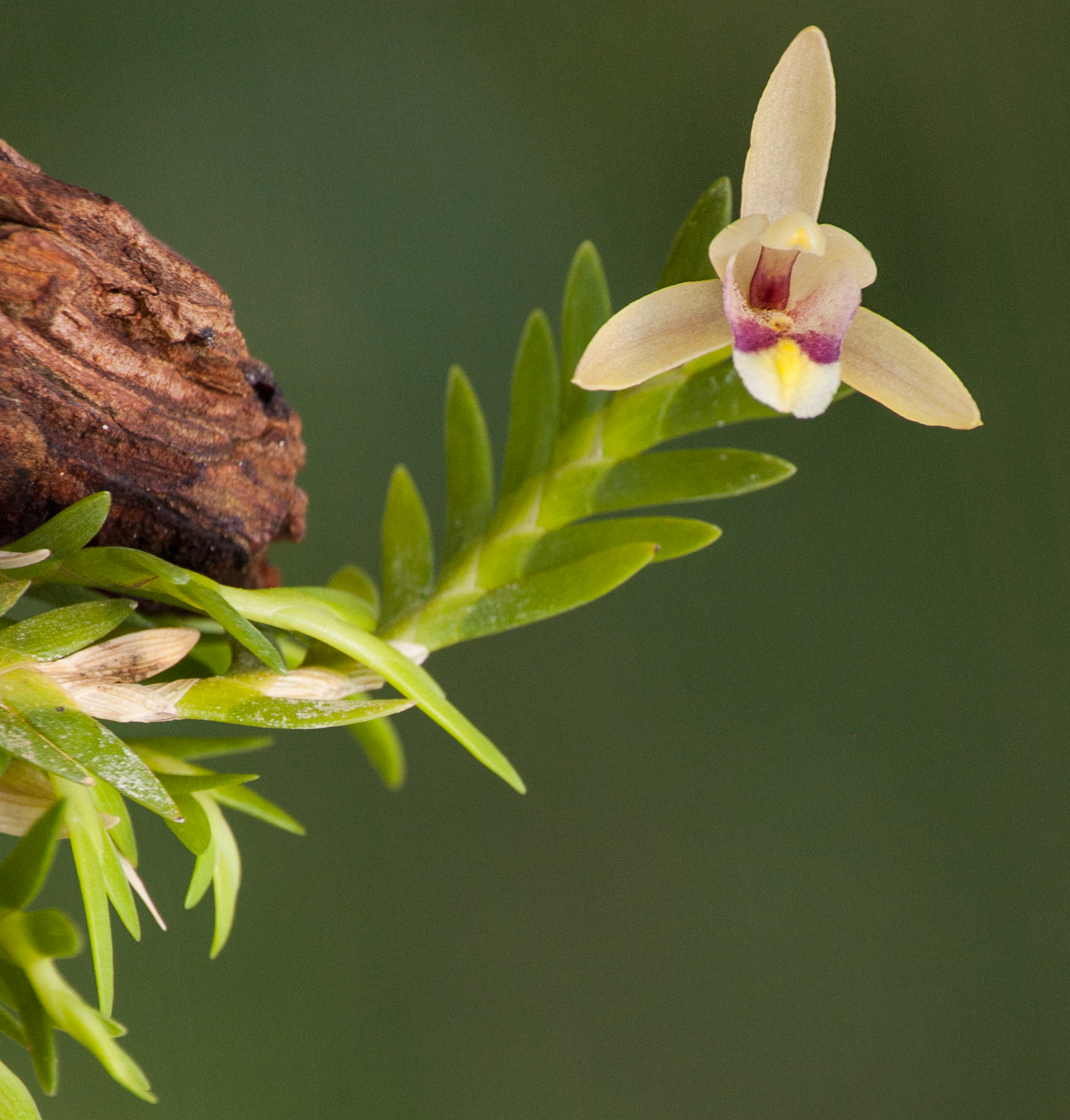
- Bromheadia brevifolia leaves and flower

Scientific classification
- Kingdom: Plantae
- Clade: Tracheophytes
- Clade: Angiosperms
- Clade: Monocots
- Order: Asparagales
- Family: Orchidaceae
- Subfamily: Epidendroideae
- Tribe: Vandeae
- Subtribe: Adrorhizinae
- Genus: Bromheadia; Lindl.

Type species
- Bromheadia finlaysoniana (Lindl.) Miq.

= Bromheadia =

Genus of orchids

Bromheadia, commonly known as reed orchids, is a genus of about 29 species of orchids in the family Orchidaceae. They are evergreen terrestrial and epiphytic plants with unbranched stems, the leaves arranged in two rows along the flowering stem. The flowers appear in succession near the end of the flowering stem with the sepals and petals free from each other. The labellum is like a landing platform and has three lobes. They are native to areas from tropical Asia to northern Australia.

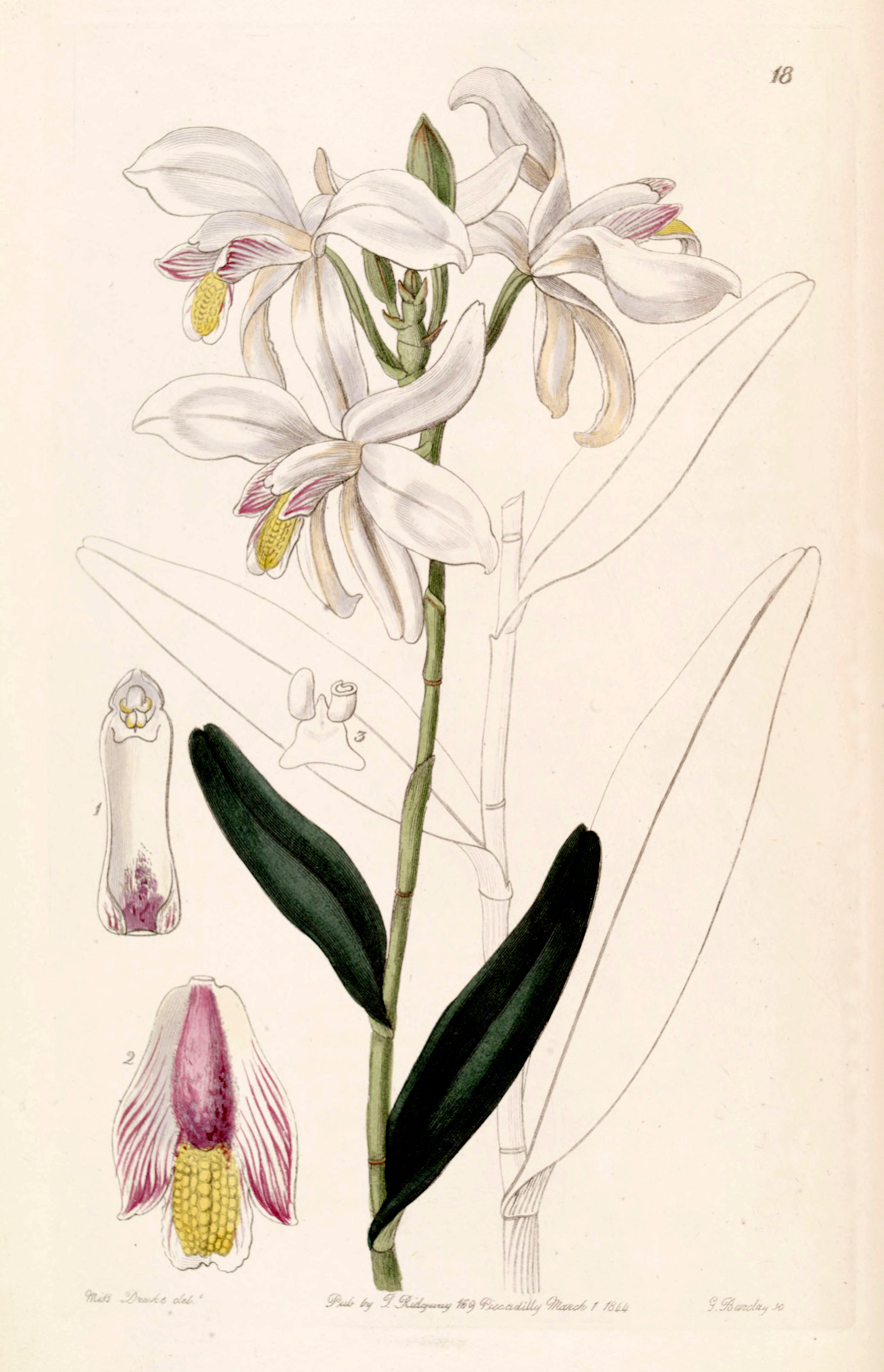
Bromheadia finlaysoniana - from Edwards's Botanical Register (1844)

== Description ==
Plants in the genus Bromheadia are evergreen, terrestrial or epiphytic, sympodial, herbs with leafy stems on a short, creeping rhizome. The leaves are arranged in two rows along an erect, unbranched stem with the flattened, leathery leaves along the upper two-thirds. The flowers are short-lived and appear singly, in succession near the ends of the flowering stem. The flowers are relatively large, resupinate and usually white, creamy yellow or reddish. The sepals are narrower but longer than petals and are often a different colour. The labellum projects forwards and has three lobes with the side lobes erect and there are two pollinia.

== Taxonomy and naming ==
The genus Bromheadia was first formally described in 1841 by John Lindley and the description was published in Edwards's Botanical Register. The genus name (Bromheadia) honours Edward Bromhead "whose investigations of the natural affinities of plants are well known to systematic Botanists".

== Distribution ==
Orchids in the genus Bromheadia are found in the region stretching from Myanmar and Vietnam south to Java and east to New Guinea and the Philippines, with a few species extending to Sri Lanka and Queensland.

== Species ==
The genus is subdivided into two sections identified by the clear morphological difference in the shape of the leaves: section Bromheadia has dorso-ventrally flattened leaves whereas section Aporodes has laterally-flattened leaves. While these two sections represent natural groups with clear morphological support, a 1997 phylogenetic study of the relationships within Bromheadia that used only morphological characters and placed Claderia as the outgroup concluded that while section Aporodes was monophyletic, section Bromheadia was paraphyletic. To resolve the conflict, the study's authors suggested that section Bromheadia either absorb section Aporodes to make one large monophyletic genus with no infrageneric subdivisions or to divide section Bromheadia into the three monophyletic groups they identified within it so that the genus would have four sections. However, no further taxonomic work has acted on this suggestion so the genus remains with two natural sections:

Section Bromheadia

- Bromheadia alticola Ridl.
- Bromheadia borneensis J.J.Sm.
  - B. borneensis var. borneensis
  - B. borneensis var. longiflora Scheind. & de Vogel
- Bromheadia crassiflora J.J.Sm.
- Bromheadia divaricata Ames & C.Schweinf.
- Bromheadia finlaysoniana (Lindl.) Miq.
- Bromheadia pendek de Vogel
- Bromheadia rupestris Ridl.

Section Aporodes

- Bromheadia annamensis Aver. & Averyanova
- Bromheadia aporoides Rchb.f.
- Bromheadia benchaii J.J.Wood & A.L.Lamb
- Bromheadia brevifolia Ridl.
- Bromheadia cecieliae Kruiz.
- Bromheadia coomansii J.J.Sm. ex Kruiz. & de Vogel
- Bromheadia devogelii Kruiz.
- Bromheadia ensifolia J.J.Sm.
- Bromheadia gracilis Kruiz. & de Vogel
- Bromheadia graminea Kruiz. & de Vogel
- Bromheadia grandiflora Kruiz. & de Vogel
- Bromheadia humilis Kruiz. & de Vogel
- Bromheadia latifolia Kruiz. & de Vogel
- Bromheadia lohaniensis Kruiz. & de Vogel
- Bromheadia longifolia Kruiz. & de Vogel
- Bromheadia pungens Ridl.
- Bromheadia robusta Kruiz. & de Vogel
- Bromheadia scirpoidea Ridl.
- Bromheadia srilankensis Kruiz. & de Vogel
- Bromheadia tenuis J.J.Sm.
- Bromheadia truncata Seidenf.

Insufficiently known

- Bromheadia falcifolia Schltr. - all known herbarium specimens were destroyed during World War II.
