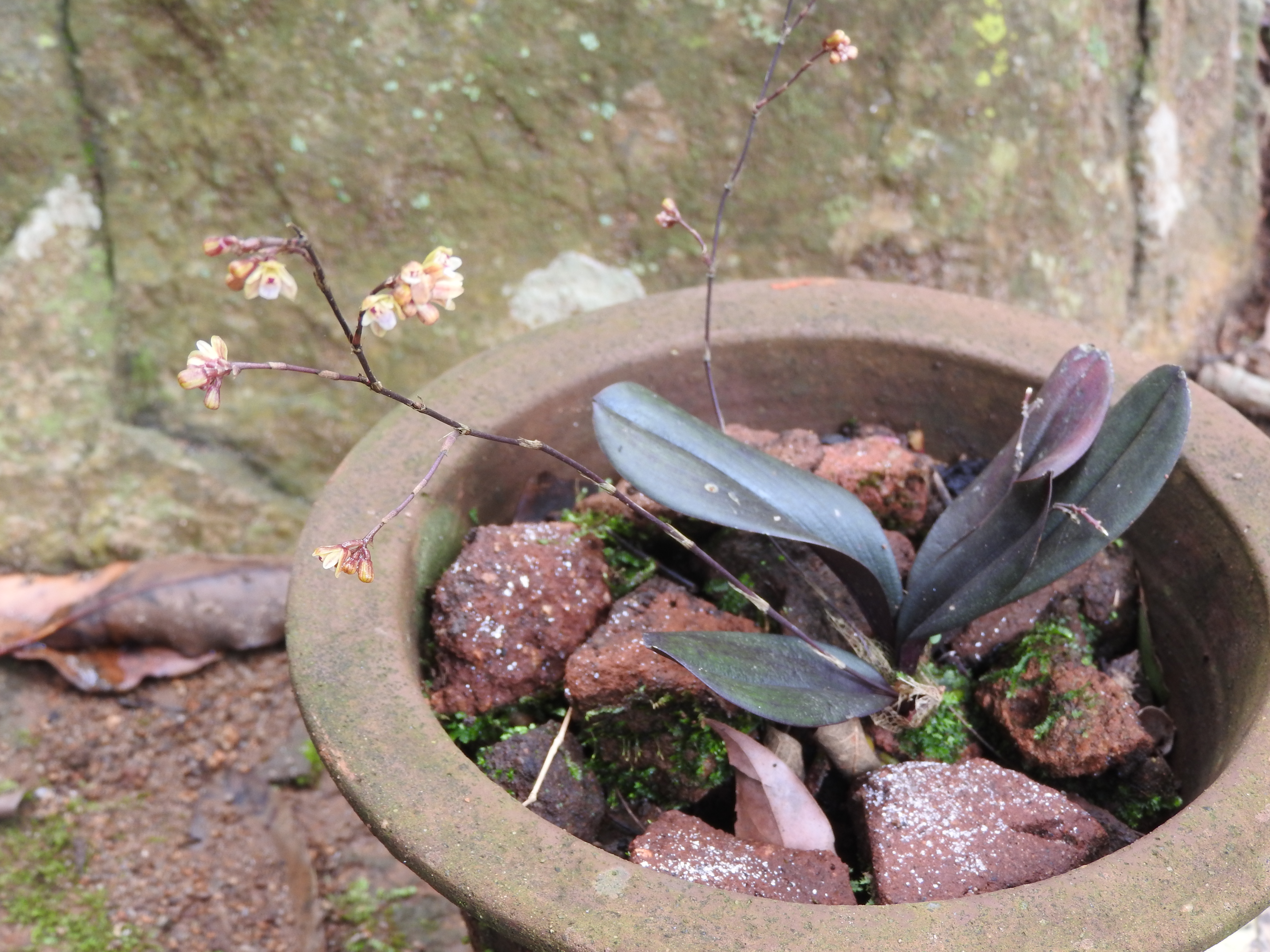
- Sirhookera hybrid

Scientific classification
- Kingdom: Plantae
- Clade: Tracheophytes
- Clade: Angiosperms
- Clade: Monocots
- Order: Asparagales
- Family: Orchidaceae
- Subfamily: Epidendroideae
- Tribe: Vandeae
- Subtribe: Adrorhizinae
- Genus: Sirhookera; Kuntze

Synonyms
- Josephia Wight, 1851, illegitimate homonym, not R.Br. 1809 nor Steud.1840

= Sirhookera =

Genus of orchids

Sirhookera is a genus of flowering plants from the orchid family, Orchidaceae. Two species are known, native to India and Sri Lanka.

- Sirhookera lanceolata (Wight) Kuntze 1891 - India and Sri Lanka
- Sirhookera latifolia (Wight) Kuntze 1891 - India and Sri Lanka
