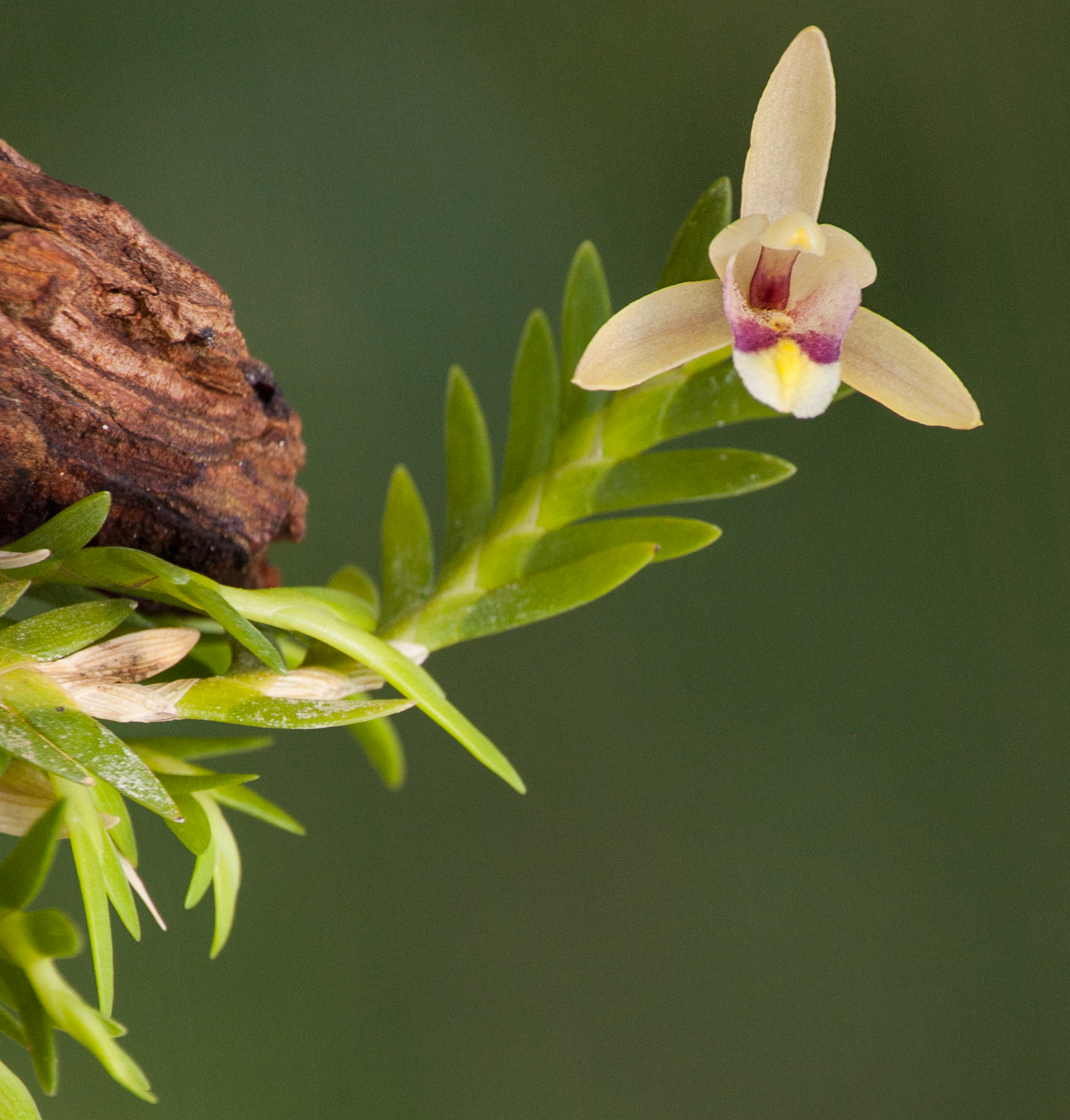

Scientific classification
- Kingdom: Plantae
- Clade: Tracheophytes
- Clade: Angiosperms
- Clade: Monocots
- Order: Asparagales
- Family: Orchidaceae
- Subfamily: Epidendroideae
- Genus: Bromheadia
- Species: B. brevifolia

Binomial name
- Bromheadia brevifolia Ridl.

= Bromheadia brevifolia =

Species of orchid

Bromheadia brevifolia is a small epiphytic orchid species in the genus Bromheadia. It is native to the Malay Peninsula, where it is found in the Malaysian states of Pahang and Perak, and on the island of Borneo in the Malaysian states of Sabah and Sarawak, as well as in Brunei. The length of its stems are covered by the leaf sheaths. The epithet brevifolia refers to the short leaves, which are about 0.5 to 2.7 cm (0.2 to 1.1 in) long and stiff. The flower is white or pale yellow with brighter yellow and violet bars on the labellum.

Bromheadia brevifolia grows as an epiphyte on trees, dead logs, and woody vines in Kerangas forests at altitudes from 600–1,660 m (1,970–5,450 ft).
