= George Finlayson =

Scottish naturalist and traveller

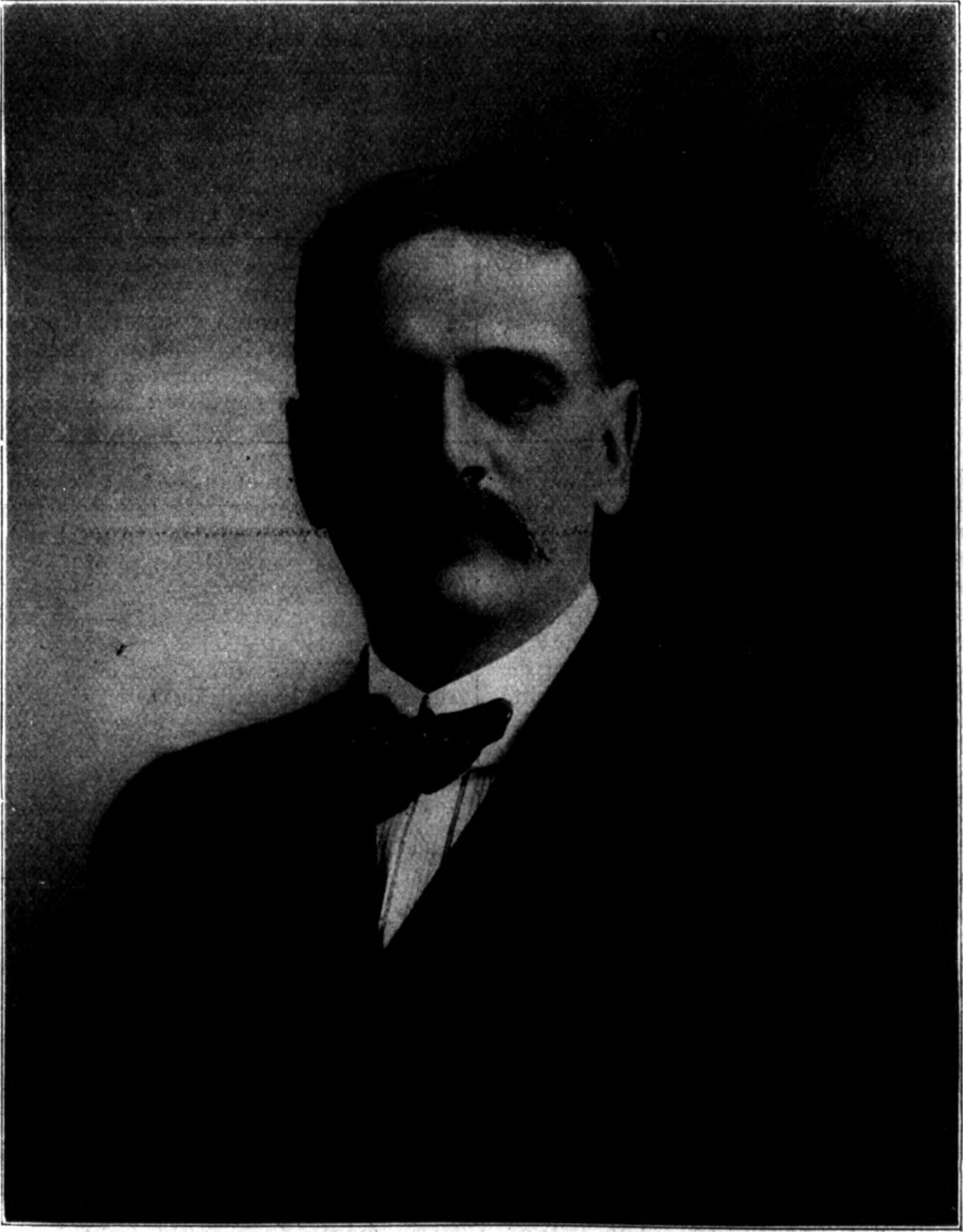
- Born: 1790; Thurso, Great Britain
- Died: 1823 (aged 32–33)

George Finlayson (1790–1823) was a Scottish naturalist and traveller. He was called one of the best naturalists of his day, and he was noted for his pioneering studies of the plants, animals, and people of southern Thailand and the Malay peninsula.

Finlayson was born in Thurso in 1790. He was clerk to Dr Somerville, chief of the army medical staff in Scotland, and afterwards to Dr Farrel, chief of the army medical staff in Ceylon. He then transferred to Bengal, and he attached to the 8th Light Dragoons as assistant surgeon in 1819. In 1821 and 1822, he accompanied the Crawfurd trade mission to Siam (now Thailand) and Cochinchina (now Vietnam) as a naturalist, returning with it to Calcutta in 1823. By this time, his health was thoroughly broken. He died on the passage from Bengal to Scotland in August 1823.

The journal he had kept during the mission was edited, with a prefatory note on the author, by Sir Stamford Raffles, F.R.S., and published in 1826 under the title The Mission to Siam and Hue, the capital of Cochin China, in the years 1821–2, from the Journal of the late George Finlayson, Esq.

The bird stripe-throated bulbul (Pycnonotus finlaysoni) and the Finlayson's squirrel (Callosciurus finlaysonii) are named in Finlayson's honour.
